= Norman Bethune Square =

Square in Montreal, Canada

- French: place Norman-Bethune
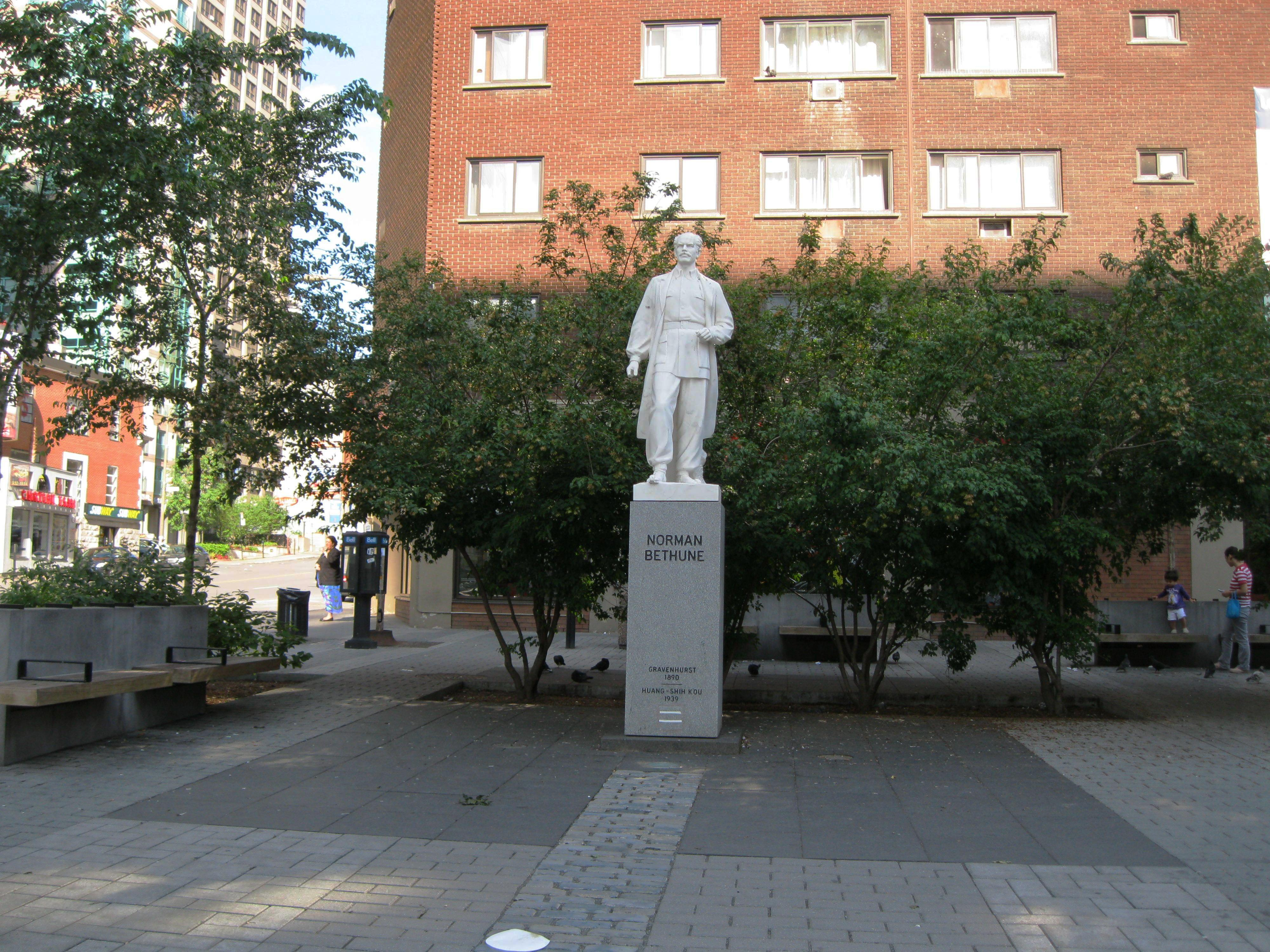
- Statue of Norman Bethune in Norman Bethune Square.

- Location within Montreal
- Type: Town square
- Location: Quartier Concordia, Ville-Marie Montreal, Quebec, Canada
- Coordinates: 45°29′46″N 73°34′46″W
- Created: March 23, 1976
- Operator: City of Montreal
- Status: Open all year

Norman Bethune Square (French: place Norman-Bethune) is a small urban square located in Downtown Montreal at the northwest intersection of Guy Street and De Maisonneuve Boulevard West. It is located close to Concordia University's Sir George Williams campus and is opposite the Guy-Concordia metro station. The main feature of the square is the statue of Dr. Norman Bethune, as well as trees, lighting, benches and an expanded sidewalk.

== Norman Bethune ==
Inaugurated on March 23, 1976, Norman Bethune Square is named after Norman Bethune (1890–1939), a Canadian doctor from Montreal. Although he was born in Gravenhurst, Ontario and died in China, Bethune resided in Montreal for eight years, from 1928 to 1936. It was during his stay in Montreal that he became a renowned thoracic surgeon, that his socialist ideas and convictions took shape, guiding him to a profound commitment towards social and humanitarian causes including joining the Communist Party of Canada.

While living in the city, Bethune innovated a number of ground-breaking medical instruments against tuberculosis. During the Great Depression, Bethune worked with Lea Roback and others to open a public clinic for the unemployed and poor as part of his cross-Canada advocacy for socialized medicine or public health care. After joining the Communist Party of Canada, he traveled to Spain as part of the International Brigades where he created one of the first mobile blood transfusion services during the Spanish Civil War. Bethune returned to Montreal to campaign for Republican Spain before leaving for China. Between 1938 and 1939, on the eve of World War II, Bethune traveled with the Chinese Workers' and Peasants' Red Army and he eventually contracted blood poisoning and died in China. The People's Republic of China offered the statue of Norman Bethune to the city of Montreal.

== Redesign ==
At the time of the 70th anniversary of the Bethune's participation in the World War II in China, the City of Montreal undertook a major renovation project of the square at a cost of C$3 million. The site was under substantial renovations as part of the redevelopment of De Maisonneuve Boulevard. The newly restored statue of Norman Bethune was unveiled on October 14, 2008. The square was completed in 2009.

== Gallery ==
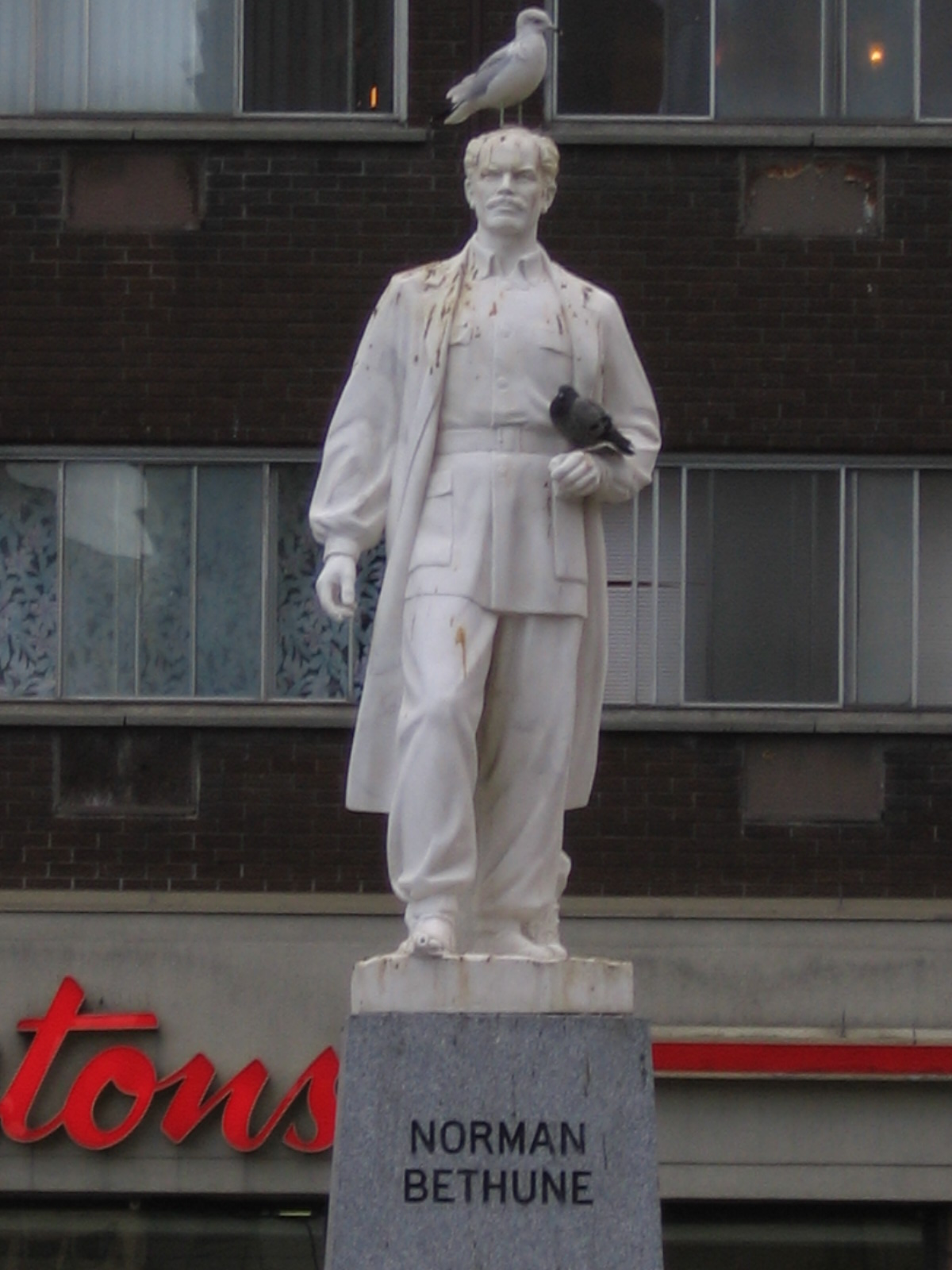

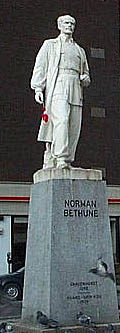

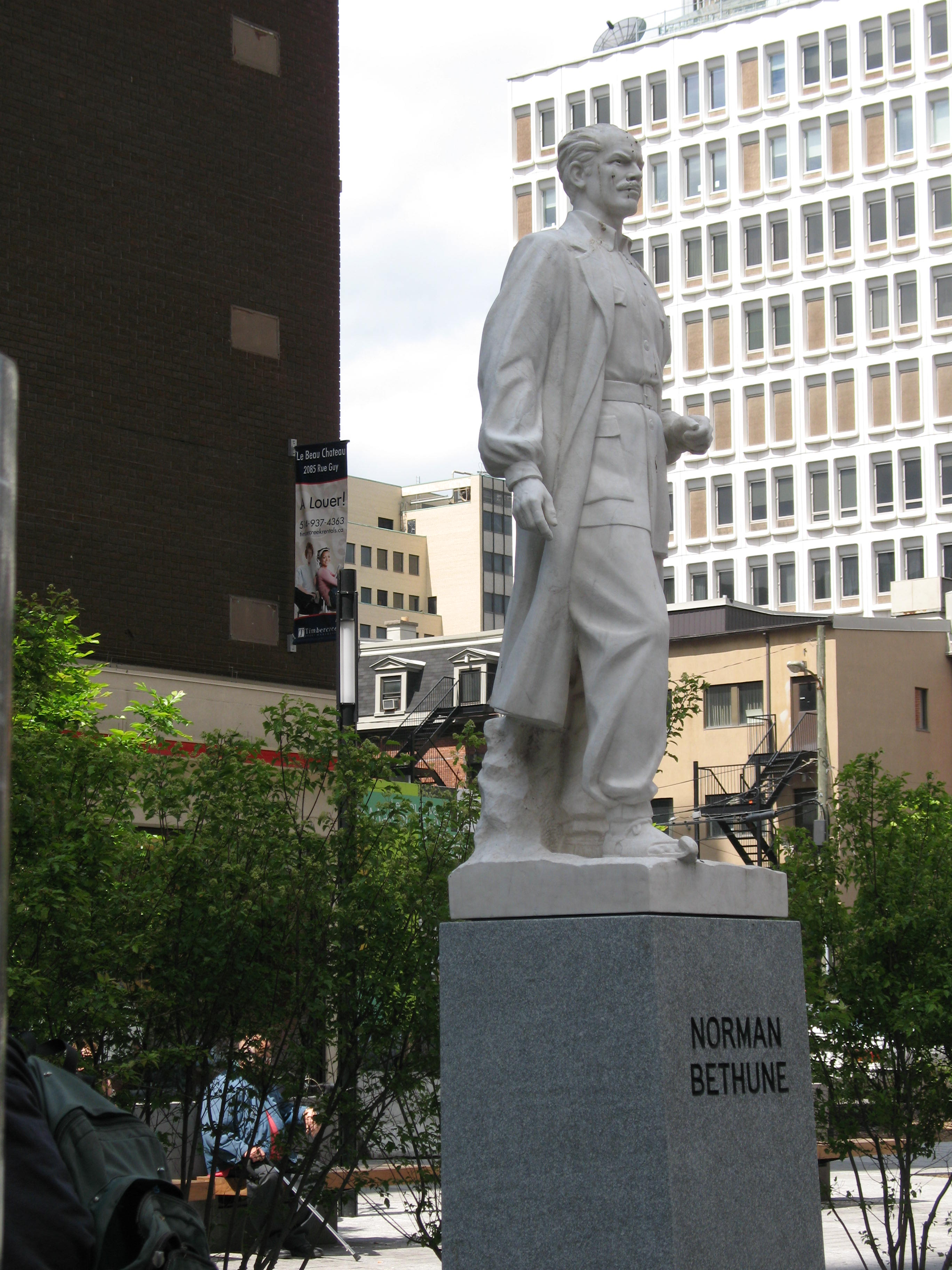

== See also ==
- Bethune Memorial House
