= Louis Guy =

Louis Guy (June 27, 1768 – February 17, 1850) was a notary and political figure in Lower Canada.

He was born in Montreal in 1768, the son of a merchant there. Guy studied to be a land surveyor and learned English at the College of New Jersey in Princeton. On his return, he articled in law with Joseph Papineau, qualified as a notary in 1801 and set up practice in Montreal. Guy was named a justice of the peace in Montreal district in 1800. He served as a major in the local militia during the War of 1812, fighting at the Battle of Châteauguay; he continued in the militia after the war, reaching the rank of colonel in 1830. He was opposed to the union of Upper and Lower Canada proposed in 1822 and helped organize resistance to the proposal. In 1830, he was named to the Legislative Council of Lower Canada. Although he was opposed to the use of force by the rebels during the Lower Canada Rebellion, he viewed the imposition of martial law as a measure only to be taken as a last resort. Guy was named a King's Notary in 1838.

He died in Montreal in 1850.

His brother Étienne served as a member of the legislative assembly.

Guy Street and Guy–Concordia station are named after him.
