= Norman Bethune =

Canadian physician (1890–1939)

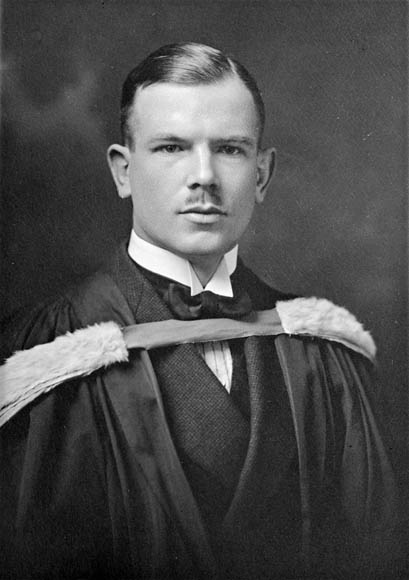
- Bethune in 1916
- Born: Henry Norman Bethune; March 4, 1890; Gravenhurst, Ontario, Canada
- Died: November 12, 1939 (aged 49); Tang County, Hebei, China
- Education: University of Toronto
- Occupations: Physician, surgeon
- Employer(s): Royal Victoria Hospital, Hôpital du Sacré-Coeur de Montréal
- Known for: Developing mobile medical units, surgical instruments and a method for transporting blood for transfusions
- Political party: Communist Party of Canada
- Awards: Canadian Medical Hall of Fame
- Military career
- Branch: Royal Canadian Army Medical Corps (1914–1915); Spanish Republican Army (1936–1937); National Revolutionary Army (1938–1939)
- Service years: 1914–1915; 1936–1937; 1938–1939
- Units: No. 2 Field Ambulance (1914–1915); Canadian Blood Transfusion Unit (1936-1937); Eighth Route Army (1938–1939)
- Conflicts: World War I: Second Battle of Ypres (WIA); Spanish Civil War; Second Sino-Japanese War

Chinese name
- Chinese: 白求恩
Transcriptions
Standard Mandarin
- Hanyu Pinyin: Bái Qiú'ēn

Transcription of full name
- Traditional Chinese: 亨利·諾爾曼·白求恩
- Simplified Chinese: 亨利·诺尔曼·白求恩
Transcriptions
Standard Mandarin
- Hanyu Pinyin: Hēnglì Nuò'ěrmàn Báiqiú'ēn

Henry Norman Bethune (/ˈbɛθ.juːn/; March 4, 1890 – November 12, 1939; Chinese: 白求恩 (Note: In Chinese, Norman Bethune is mainly known by his Chinese name 白求恩 (Bái Qiú'ēn), which phonetically mimics his English surname while appearing to be like a native Chinese name. The Xinhua Transliteration Manual for English Names recommends that 贝休恩 (Bèixiū'ēn) be used to transcribe the surname Bethune in general cases; meanwhile, the manual lists Norman Bethune's Chinese name 白求恩 as an alternate form of transliteration.)) was a Canadian thoracic surgeon, early advocate of universal health care, and member of the Communist Party of Canada. Bethune came to international prominence first for his service as a frontline trauma surgeon supporting the Republican government during the Spanish Civil War, and later supporting the Chinese Communist Party's (CCP) Eighth Route Army during the Second Sino-Japanese War. Bethune helped bring modern medicine to rural China, treating both sick villagers and wounded soldiers. He died from infection during an operation, prompting Mao Zedong to dedicate a eulogy to him. He remains widely commemorated in China today.

== Family history ==
Bethune came from a prominent Scottish Canadian family, whose origins can be traced back to the Bethune/Beaton medical kindred who practised medicine in the Highlands and Islands of Scotland from the Middle Ages to the Early Modern Era. His great-great-grandfather, the Reverend Doctor John Bethune (1751–1815), the family patriarch, established the first Presbyterian congregation in Montreal and first five Presbyterian churches in Ontario, and was one of the founders of the Presbyterian Church of Canada.

Bethune's great-grandfather, Angus Bethune (1783–1858), joined the North West Company (NWC) at an early age and travelled extensively throughout what was the North West of Canada at that time, exploring and trading for furs. Angus Bethune married Louise McKenzie (1793–1833), a Métis woman. Louise McKenzie was the daughter of the Hon. Roderick McKenzie, a prominent NWC partner, and his country wife. Bethune and McKenzie were both stationed at the Fort William fur trade post at the head of Lake Superior. He eventually reached the Pacific at Fort Astoria, Oregon. He became chief factor of the Lake Huron district for the Hudson's Bay Company (HBC) after the merger of the rival companies. Upon retirement from the HBC in 1839, he successfully ran for a post as an alderman on Toronto City Council.

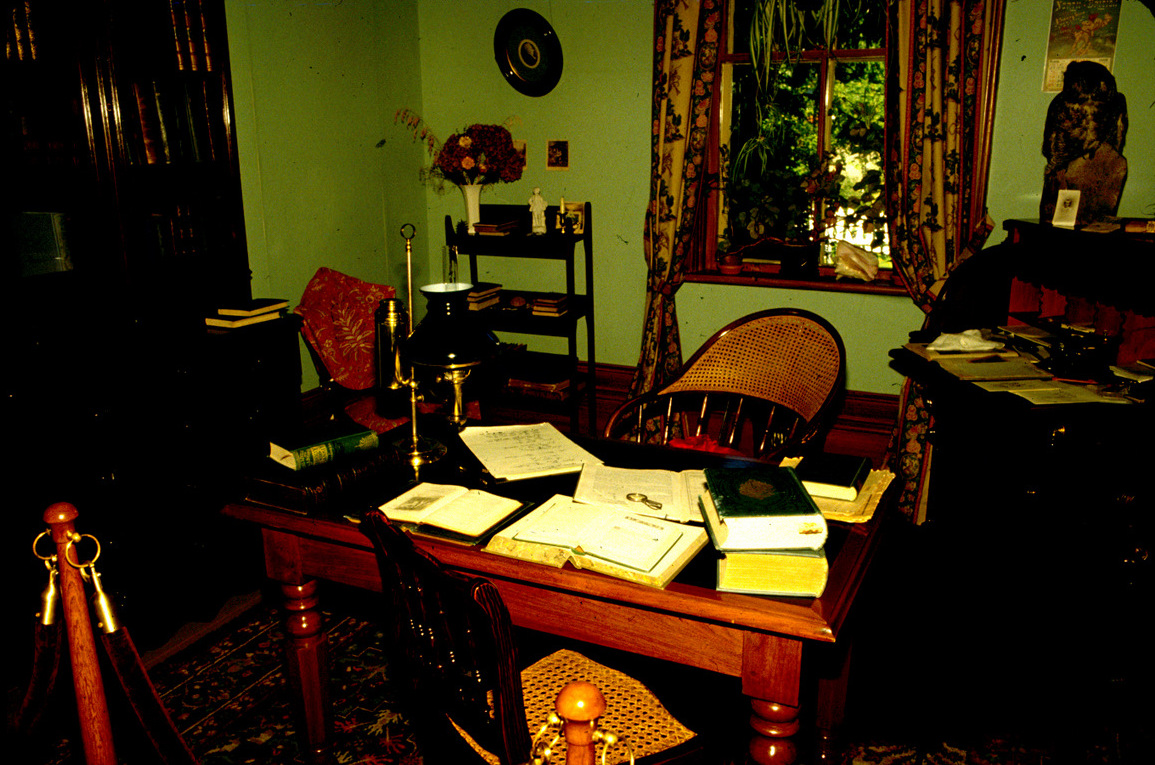
The study of Reverend Malcolm Bethune (father of Norman) in Gravenhurst

Bethune's grandfather, Norman Bethune, Sr. (1822–1892), was educated as a doctor at King's College, University of Toronto, and in London, England, at Guy's Hospital, graduating in 1848 as a member of the Royal College of Surgeons. He went on to become a Fellow of the Royal College of Surgeons of Edinburgh in 1860 and practised in Edinburgh until 1869. Upon his return to Canada, he became one of the founders of the Upper Canada School of Medicine, which was incorporated into Trinity College, Toronto and eventually the University of Toronto.

Bethune's father, the Rev. Malcolm Nicolson Bethune, led an uneventful life as a small-town pastor, initially at Gravenhurst, Ontario, from 1889 to 1892. His mother was Elizabeth Ann Goodwin, an English immigrant to Canada. Both his parents were very religious, though Bethune himself was an atheist. Bethune grew up with a "fear of being mediocre", instilled into him by his emotionally strict father and domineering mother.

Bethune is a distant ancestor of actor Christopher Plummer.

== Early life ==
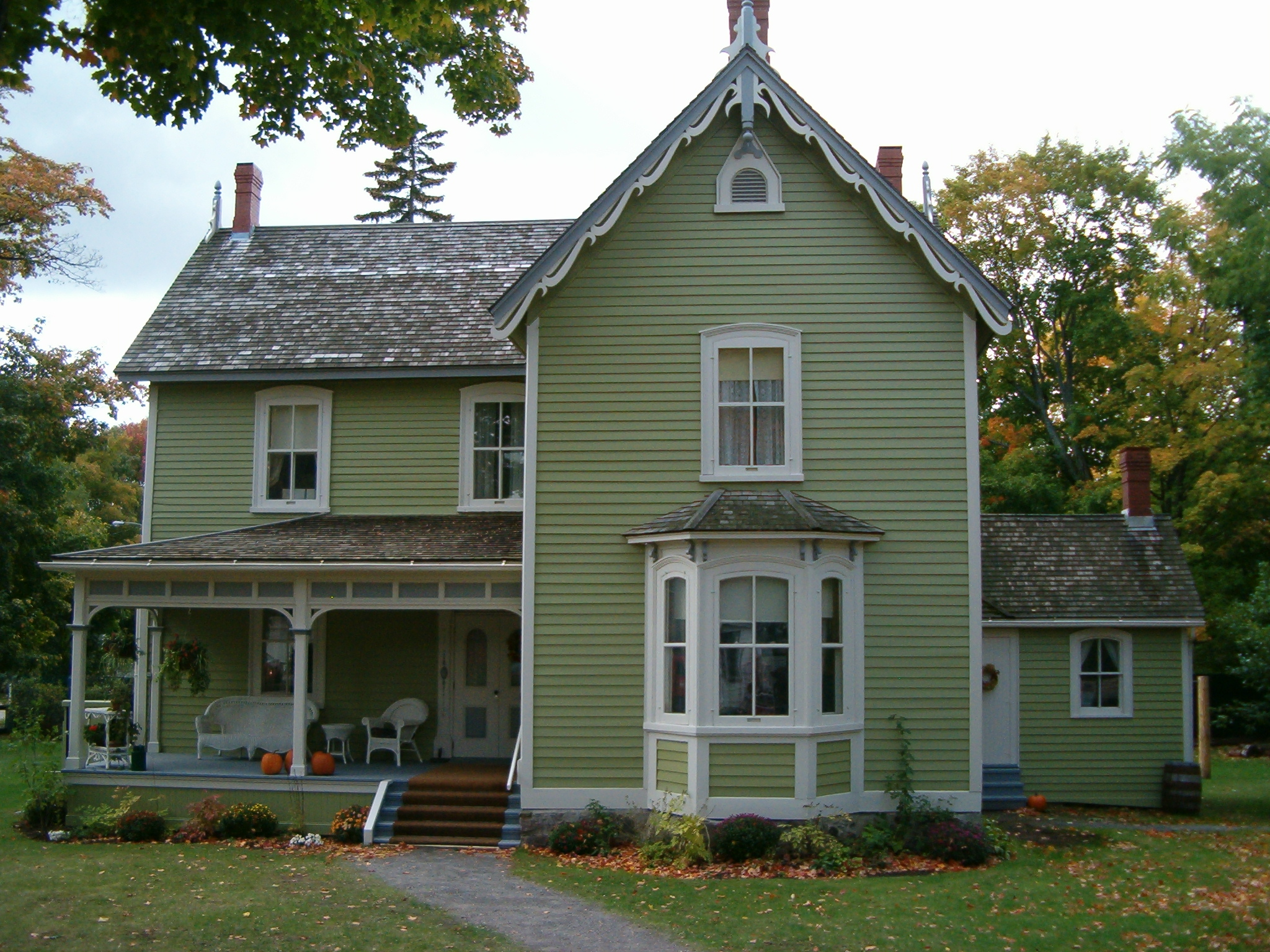
Norman Bethune's birthplace, now Bethune Memorial House

Bethune was born in Gravenhurst, Ontario, on March 4, 1890. His birth certificate erroneously stated March 3. His siblings were his sister Janet and brother Malcolm.

As a youth, Bethune attended Owen Sound Collegiate Institute, graduating in 1908.

== Early career ==
After a brief period as a primary school teacher in Edgeley, in 1909, he enrolled at University College, University of Toronto to study physiology and biochemistry. He interrupted his studies for one year in 1911 to be a volunteer labourer-teacher with the Reading Camp Association (later Frontier College) at a remote lumber camp near Whitefish, Sudbury. He returned to the University of Toronto in the fall of 1912, this time in the Faculty of Medicine.

== War service ==
In 1914, when World War I was declared in Europe, he once again suspended his medical studies after being accepted into the Royal Canadian Army Medical Corps. Bethune joined the Canadian Army's No. 2 Field Ambulance to serve as a stretcher-bearer in France. He was wounded by shrapnel at the Second Battle of Ypres and sent to an English hospital to recover, repatriating to Canada in October 1915. When he had recuperated from his injuries, he returned to Toronto to complete his medical degree. He received his M.D. in 1916.

== Post-war career ==
In the 1920s the established treatment for tuberculosis was total bed rest in a sanatorium. While convalescing Bethune read about a radical new treatment for tuberculosis called artificial pneumothorax. This involved artificially collapsing the tubercular (diseased) lung, thus allowing it to rest and heal itself. The physicians at the Trudeau thought this procedure was too new and risky, but Bethune insisted on having the operation performed and made a full and complete recovery.

In 1928 Bethune joined thoracic surgical pioneer Edward William Archibald, surgeon-in-chief of the McGill University's Royal Victoria Hospital in Montreal. From 1928 to 1936 Bethune perfected his skills in thoracic surgery and developed or modified more than a dozen new surgical tools. His most famous instrument was the Bethune Rib Shears, which remain in use today. He published 14 articles describing his innovations in thoracic technique. He started his career in surgery at the Toronto General Hospital in 1921.

== Personal life ==
In 1920, he met Frances Penney, whom he married in 1923. After a one-year "Grand Tour" of Europe, during which they spent much of her inheritance, they moved to Detroit, Michigan, where Bethune took up private practice and also took a part-time job as an instructor at the Detroit College of Medicine and Surgery.

In 1926, Bethune contracted tuberculosis. He sought treatment at the Trudeau Sanatorium in Saranac Lake, New York. At this time, Frances divorced Bethune and returned to her home in Scotland.

In 1929 Bethune remarried Frances; the best man at the wedding was his friend and colleague Graham Ross. They divorced again, for the final time, in 1933.

== Political activities ==
Bethune became increasingly concerned with the socio-economic aspects of disease. As a concerned doctor in Montreal during the economic depression years of the 1930s, Bethune frequently sought out the poor and gave them free medical care. He challenged his professional colleagues and agitated, without success, for the government to make radical reforms of medical care and health services in Canada.

Bethune was an early proponent of socialized medicine and formed the Montreal Group for the Security of People's Health. In 1935 Bethune travelled to the Soviet Union to observe firsthand their system of universal free health care. During this year he became a committed Communist and joined the Communist Party of Canada. When returning from the Spanish Civil War to raise support for the Loyalist cause, he openly identified with the Communist cause.

== Spanish Civil War ==
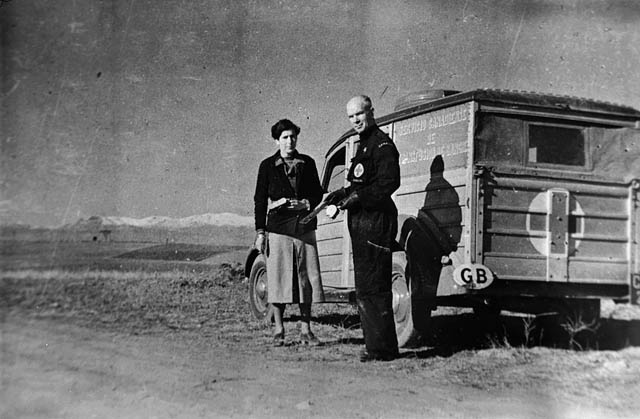
Canadian Blood Transfusion Unit which operated during the Spanish Civil War. Dr Norman Bethune is to the right (c. 1936–37, Spain).

Shortly after the outbreak of the Spanish Civil War in 1936, with the financial backing of the North American Committee to Aid Spanish Democracy, Bethune went to Spain to offer his services to the government (Loyalist) forces. He arrived in Madrid on November 3.

Unable to find a place where he could be used as a surgeon, he seized on an idea which may have been inspired by his limited experience of administering blood transfusions as Head of Thoracic Surgery at the Hôpital du Sacré-Coeur in Montreal between 1932 and 1936. The idea was to set up a mobile blood transfusion service by which he could take blood donated by civilians in bottles to wounded soldiers near the front lines. The unit was officially presented to the Republicans in 1937 by Alexander Albert MacLeod under Bethune's direction. Though this unit, the Servicio canadiense de transfusión de sangre, was not the first of its kind—a similar service had been set up in Barcelona by a Spanish haematologist, Frederic Durán-Jordà, and had been functioning since September—Bethune's Madrid-based unit covered a far wider area of operation. The first vehicle he used was a Renault ADH and they later used a modified Ford station wagon.

Bethune returned to Canada on June 6, 1937, where he went on a speaking tour to raise money and volunteers for the Spanish Civil War.

Shortly before leaving for Spain, Bethune wrote the following poem, published in the July 1937 edition of The Canadian Forum:

And this same pallid moon tonight,

Which rides so quietly, clear and high,
The mirror of our pale and troubled gaze,
Raised to a cool Canadian sky.

Above the shattered mountain tops,
Last night, rose low and wild and red,
Reflecting back from her illumined shield,
The blood bespattered faces of the dead.

To that pale disc, we raise our clenched fists,
And to those nameless dead our vows renew,
"Comrades, who fought for freedom and the future world,

Who died for us, we will remember you."

== China ==
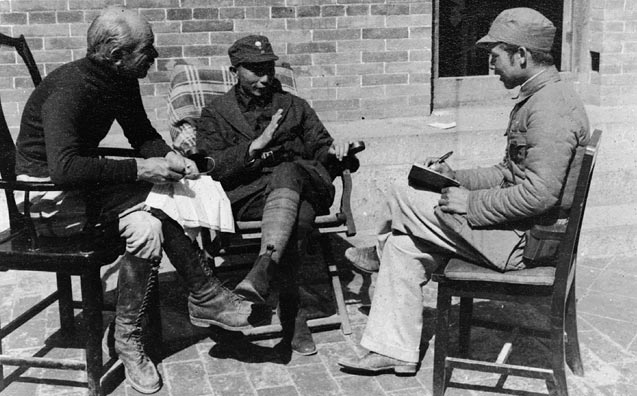
Norman Bethune in China with Nie Rongzhen (centre) and an interpreter, 1938.

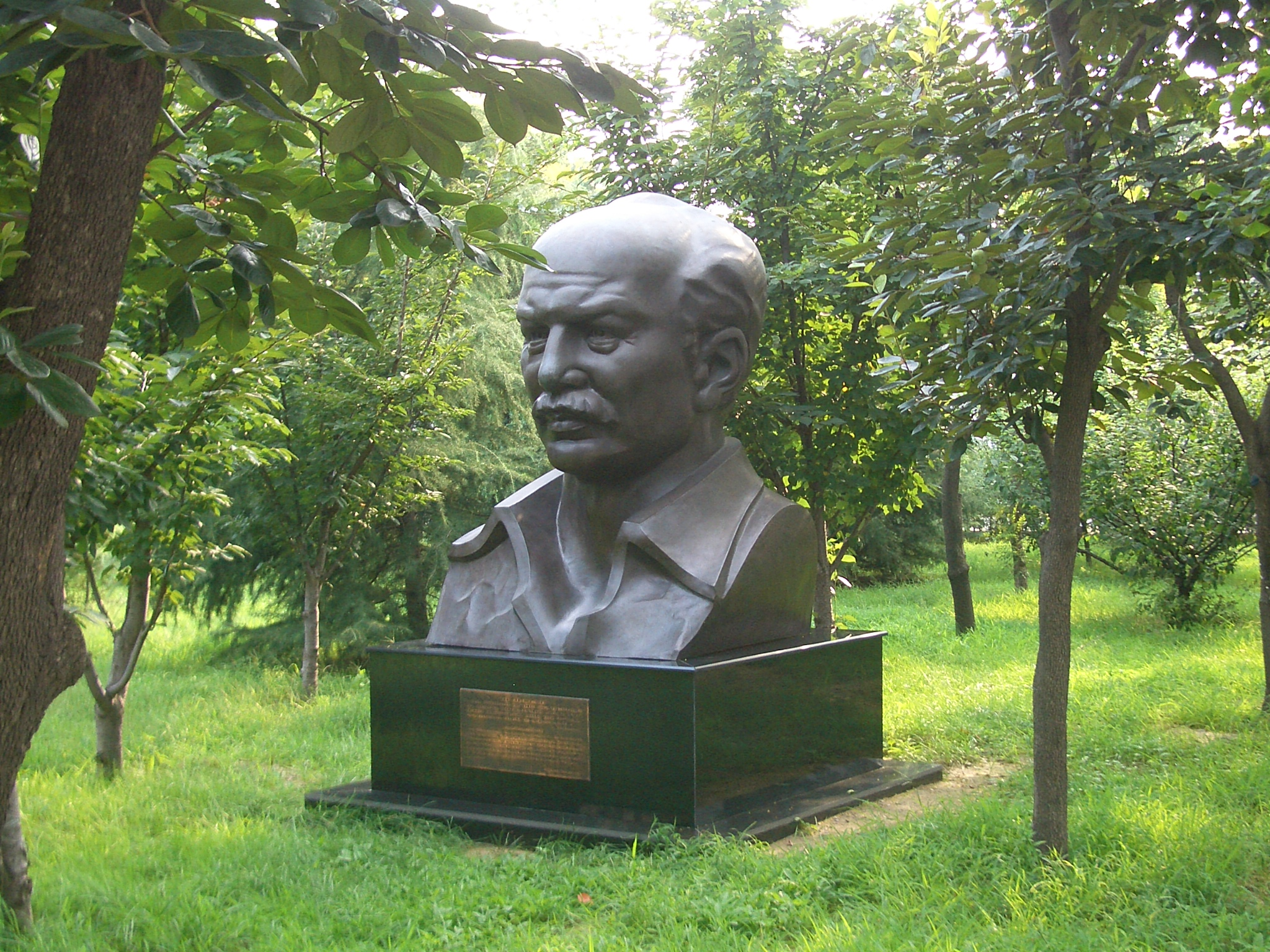
Statue of Bethune at Wanping Fortress, Beijing

In January 1938, during the Second Sino-Japanese War, Bethune travelled to Yan'an in the Shanbei region of Shaanxi province in China. There, he supported the Chinese Communist Party led by Mao Zedong. The Lebanese-American doctor George Hatem, who had come to Yan'an earlier, was instrumental in helping Bethune get started at his task of organizing medical services for the front and the region.

In China, Bethune performed emergency battlefield surgical operations on war casualties and established training for doctors, nurses, and orderlies. He did not distinguish between sides in treating casualties.

Bethune had thoughts on the manner in which medicine was practised, and stated:

Medicine, as we are practising it, is a luxury trade. We are selling bread at the price of jewels. ... Let us take the profit, the private economic profit, out of medicine, and purify our profession of rapacious individualism ... Let us say to the people not 'How much have you got?' but 'How best can we serve you?'

In the summer of 1939, Bethune was appointed medical advisor to the Jin-Cha-Ji (Shanxi-Chahar-Hebei) Border Region Military District, under the direction of General Nie Rongzhen.

=== Death ===
Stationed with the Chinese Communist Party's Eighth Route Army, Bethune cut his left middle finger on October 29, 1939, while retrieving bony fragments from a soldier with a wounded leg. Three days later on November 1, while operating on another soldier with neck erysipelas, his finger wound reopened and was infected. Likely due to malnourishment, which gave him a weakened state, he contracted septicaemia and died on November 12, 1939.

Bethune's service to the CCP earned him the respect of Mao Zedong, who wrote a eulogy dedicated to Bethune when he died in 1939. His name is honored in China to this day.

There is considerable controversy surrounding the last will which Bethune purportedly wrote on the eve of his death. Here follows one version:

Dear Commander Nie,
Today I feel really unwell. Probably I have to say farewell to you forever! Please send a letter to Tim Buck the General Secretary of the Canadian Communist Party. The address is No. 10, Wellington Street, Toronto, Canada. Please also make a copy for Committee on International Aid to China and Democratic Alliance of Canada, tell them, I am very happy here ... Please give my Kodak Retina II camera to comrade Sha Fei.
— Norman Bethune, 04:20pm, November 11th, 1939.

== Legacy ==
=== In Canada ===
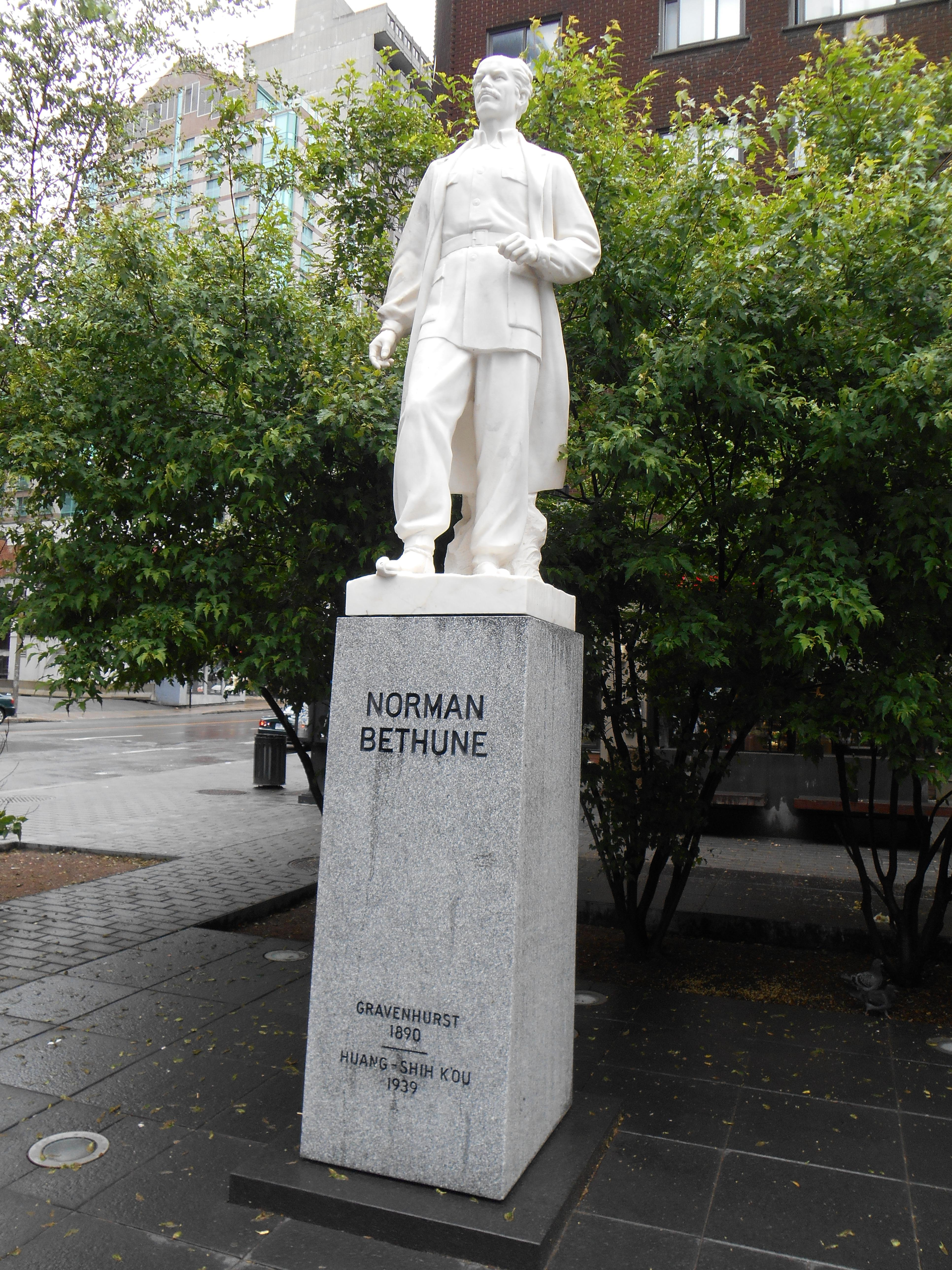
A statue of Bethune in Montreal's Norman Bethune Square.

In 1973, following the visit of Prime Minister Pierre Trudeau to China, the Government of Canada purchased the manse of Presbyterian Church in Gravenhurst, in which Bethune was born. The previous year, Dr. Bethune had been declared a Person of National Historic Significance. In 1976, the restored building was opened to the public as Bethune Memorial House. In 2012, the Government of Canada opened a new visitor centre, to enhance the experience of visitors to the site. The house is operated as a National Historic Site of Canada by Parks Canada.

In 1979, Dr. Norman Bethune Collegiate Institute was founded in Scarborough.

In 1998, Bethune was inducted into the Canadian Medical Hall of Fame located in London, Ontario. In 2000, the University of Toronto inaugurated the annual Bethune Round Table on International Surgery, an annual surgical conference named in his honour.

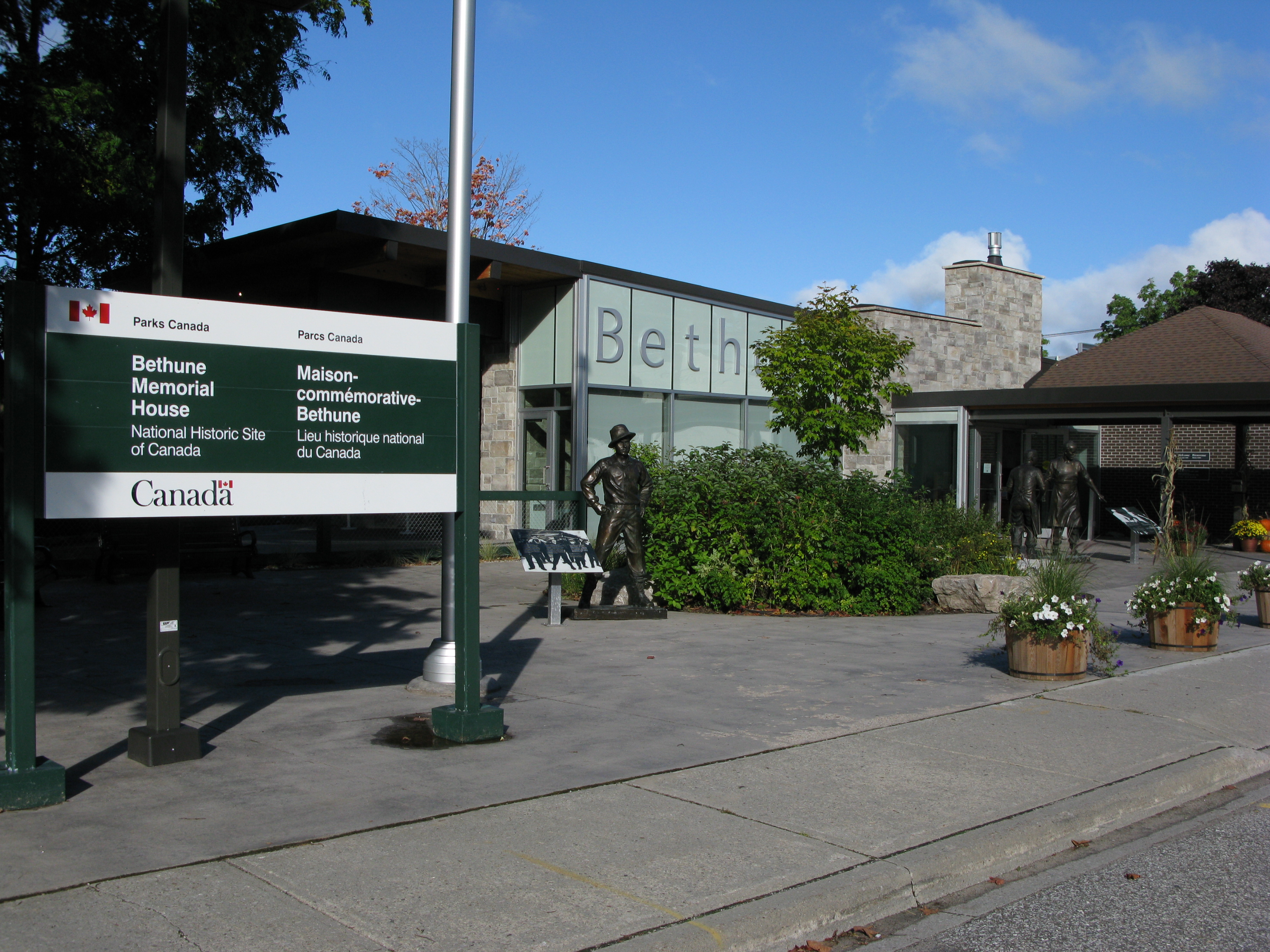
Bethune Memorial House Visitor Centre in Gravenhurst, opened in May 2013.

In August 2000, then-Governor General Adrienne Clarkson, who is of Chinese descent, visited Gravenhurst and unveiled a bronze statue of him erected by the town. It stands in front of the Opera House on the town's main street, Muskoka Road.

The city of Montreal, Quebec, has created a public square and erected a statue of him in his honour, located near the Guy–Concordia metro station. His archives are held at McGill University in the Osler Library of the History of Medicine.

In March 1990, to commemorate the centenary of his birth, Canada and China each issued two postage stamps of the same design in his honour.

Banners with a stylized photo of him titled Local Heroes, hang in the River District of Owen Sound with his birthdate and death and listing his accomplishments as "Surgeon, Inventor, Political Activist, Artist, Writer, Poet".

=== In China ===
Virtually unknown in his homeland during his lifetime, Bethune received international recognition when Mao Zedong published his eulogy entitled In Memory of Norman Bethune (Chinese: 紀念白求恩), which documented the final months of the doctor's life in China. The text was included in Chinese elementary school textbooks in the 1960s. It was removed in 2013 before being reinstated in 2016 and remains today:

Comrade Bethune's spirit, his utter devotion to others without any thought of self, was shown in his great sense of responsibility in his work and his great warm-heartedness towards all comrades and the people. Every Communist must learn from him. ... We must all learn the spirit of absolute selflessness from him. With this spirit everyone can be very useful to the people. A man's ability may be great or small, but if he has this spirit, he is already noble-minded and pure, a man of moral integrity and above vulgar interests, a man who is of value to the people.

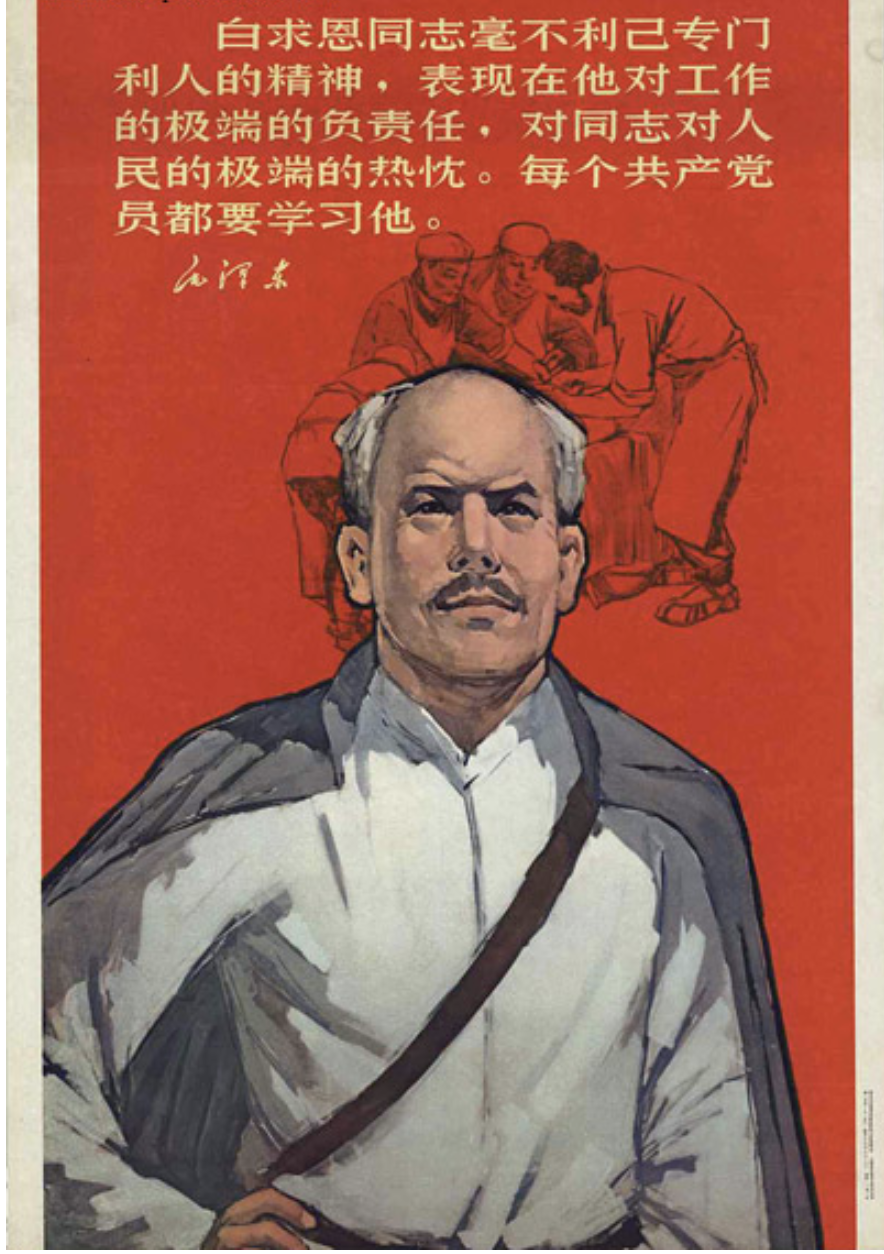
1968 propaganda poster depicting Bethune with a quotation from Mao's eulogy for him

Bethune was promoted as a role model for medical workers and Communist Party members. During the Third Front campaign to develop basic industry and national defense industry in China's interior, the eulogy was frequently assigned for Third Front workers to read. By the Cultural Revolution, Bethune's legacy was promoted throughout the Chinese population and held up as a model of internationalism.

Bethune is one of the few Westerners to whom China has dedicated statues, of which many have been erected in his honour throughout the country. He is buried in the Revolutionary Martyrs' Cemetery, Shijiazhuang, Hebei Province, China, where his tomb and memorial hall lie opposite the tomb of Dwarkanath Kotnis, an Indian doctor also honoured for his humanitarian efforts in China.

Elsewhere in China, the Norman Bethune University of Medical Sciences (Chinese: 白求恩医科大学) in Changchun, Jilin province, was one of the eleven national medical universities directly subordinated to Ministry of Health of the People's Republic of China. The predecessor of this university was the Hygiene School of Jin-Cha-Ji Military Region of the Eighth Route Army (八路军晋察冀军区卫生学校 in Chinese) founded in 1939 by Bethune's advocacy. The school developed with Bethune Hygiene School (February 16, 1940), Bethune Medical School (Jan 1946), Bethune Medical University (June 1946), Medical University of North China (1948), First Military Medical University (1951 in Tianjin), moved to Changchun in 1954, Medical College of Changchun (July 1958), Medical University of Jilin (June 1959), Norman Bethune University of Medical Sciences (March 1978), merged into Jilin University as Norman Bethune Health Science Center of Jilin University in 2000. There are at least three dedicated statues of Bethune in this university: in the west square of College of Basic Medicine, in the Second Affiliated Hospital and in the Third Affiliated Hospital.

He is also commemorated at three institutions in Shijiazhuang – Bethune Military Medical College, Bethune Specialized Medical College and Bethune International Peace Hospital. In Canada, Norman Bethune College at York University, and Dr. Norman Bethune Collegiate Institute (a secondary school) in Scarborough, Ontario, are named after him.

The biannually awarded Bethune Medal (Chinese: 白求恩奖章), established in 1991, is the highest medical honour in China, bestowed to up to seven individuals by the Ministry of Health and Ministry of Personnel of China, to recognize outstanding contribution, heroic spirit and great humanitarianism in the medical field.

The 2007 Harbin International Ice and Snow Sculpture Festival featured as its central theme a memorial to Bethune.

Bethune is among the "foreign friends of China" that Xi Jinping cites in his foreign policy discourses in an effort to recognize the contributions of other countries to China's national liberation.

=== In Spain ===
On February 7, 2006, the city of Málaga, Spain, opened the Walk of Canadians in his memory. This avenue, which runs parallel to the beach "Crow Rock" direction to Almeria, paid tribute to the solidarity action of Dr. Norman Bethune and his colleagues who helped the population of Málaga during the Spanish Civil War. During the ceremony, a commemorative plaque was unveiled with the inscription: "Walk of Canadians – In memory of aid from the people of Canada at the hands of Norman Bethune, provided to the refugees of Málaga in February 1937". The ceremony also included a planting of an olive tree and a maple tree representative of Spain and Canada as a symbol of friendship.

=== In film and literature ===
Doctor Bethune (Chinese: 白求恩大夫; pinyin: Bái Qiú'ēn Dàifu), was made in 1964; Gerald Tannebaum, an American humanitarian, played Bethune.

Bethune was the subject of a 1964 National Film Board of Canada documentary Bethune, directed by Donald Brittain. The film includes interviews with many people close to Bethune, including his biographer Ted Allan.

Donald Sutherland played Bethune in the 1974–75 television show Witness to Yesterday hosted by Patrick Watson.

Sutherland's portrayal of Bethune in Witness to Yesterday probably led to him securing the role of Bethune in two biographical films: Bethune (1977), made for television on a low budget, and Bethune: The Making of a Hero (1990). The latter, based on a 1952 book The Scalpel, The Sword; The Story Of Doctor Norman Bethune by Ted Allan and Sydney Gordon, was a co-production of Telefilm Canada, the Canadian Broadcasting Corporation, FR3 TV France and China Film Co-production.

In the CBC's The Greatest Canadian program in 2004, he was voted the 26th Greatest Canadian by viewers.

In 2006, China Central Television produced a 20-part drama series, Norman Bethune (诺尔曼·白求恩), documenting his life, which with a budget of yuan 30 million (US$3.75 million) was the most expensive Chinese TV series to date. The series is directed by Yang Yang and starred Canadian actor Trevor Hayes.

The 2006 novel The Communist's Daughter, by Dennis Bock, is a fictionalized account of Bethune's life.

Adrienne Clarkson, a Chinese-Canadian and former Governor General, wrote a biography of Bethune and tells his story in the companion documentary Adrienne Clarkson on Norman Bethune.

The Bethune biographer, Roderick Stewart, has produced five books on Norman Bethune, including Bethune (1973), The Canadians: Norman Bethune (1974), and The Mind of Norman Bethune (1990). In 2011, he co-authored with Sharon Stewart, Phoenix: The Life of Norman Bethune, a book which Canadian author Michael Bliss, in his review in The Globe and Mail, said, "should become the definitive basis for all serious discussion of Bethune". In 2014 Bethune in Spain, written by Stewart and co-author Jesus Majada, was published by Oberon Press.

The television miniseries Canada: A People's History, by CBC Television, briefly mentioned Bethune's story during the episode describing Canadians in the Spanish Civil War.

When the CBC decided to produce a film version of Rod Langley's 1973 play Bethune, they offered the leading role to Donald Sutherland. After accepting, Sutherland persuaded the CBC to allow Thomas Rickman to rework the Langley script. Rickman's script, based on Roderick Stewart's 1973 biography Bethune, was used in Bethune, the 1977 CBC film production.

The character Jerome Martell in Hugh MacLennan's novel The Watch That Ends the Night is generally thought to have been inspired by Bethune, a claim MacLennan denied, though they were known to one another and MacLennan based much of his writing off his own life experiences. Canadian rock group The Tragically Hip wrote their 1992 hit Courage (for Hugh MacLennan) in tribute to the author and in reference to The Watch in particular. The song's refrain 'Courage, it couldn't have come at a worse time' is a reference to the novel's climax, in which the 'Bethunian' qualities of Jerome Martell are at their peak.

The Secret History of the Intrepids, by D. K. Latta, is an alternate-history fantasy story imagining Norman Bethune, William Stephenson, Grey Owl and others as 1940s superheroes. It was published in the 2013 anthology, Masked Mosaic: Canadian Super Stories.

In the science fiction novel The Three-Body Problem by Cixin Liu, a foreigner named Mike Evans is given the nickname "Bethune" by the inhabitants of a remote area in northwestern China.

Norman Bethune is a character in the novel Los pacientes del doctor García by Almudena Grandes, where he teaches the titular character his blood transfusion techniques in a besieged Madrid during the Spanish Civil War.

== See also ==
- Bethune Memorial House
- Canada–China relations
- Dwarkanath Kotnis
- Edgar Snow
- Edward H. Hume
- Gregor Robertson, Mayor of Vancouver and distant relative of Bethune
- Christopher Plummer, distant relative of Bethune
- Jean Ewen, (于青莲) a Canadian nurse who worked with Bethune in China
- John Rabe
- Joseph Terence Montgomery Needham
- Leonora King, a Canadian doctor honoured by the Qing Empire for her work during the First Sino-Japanese War
- Three Old Articles (China)
