= Bethune Memorial House =

Coordinates: 44°55′16″N 79°22′35″W

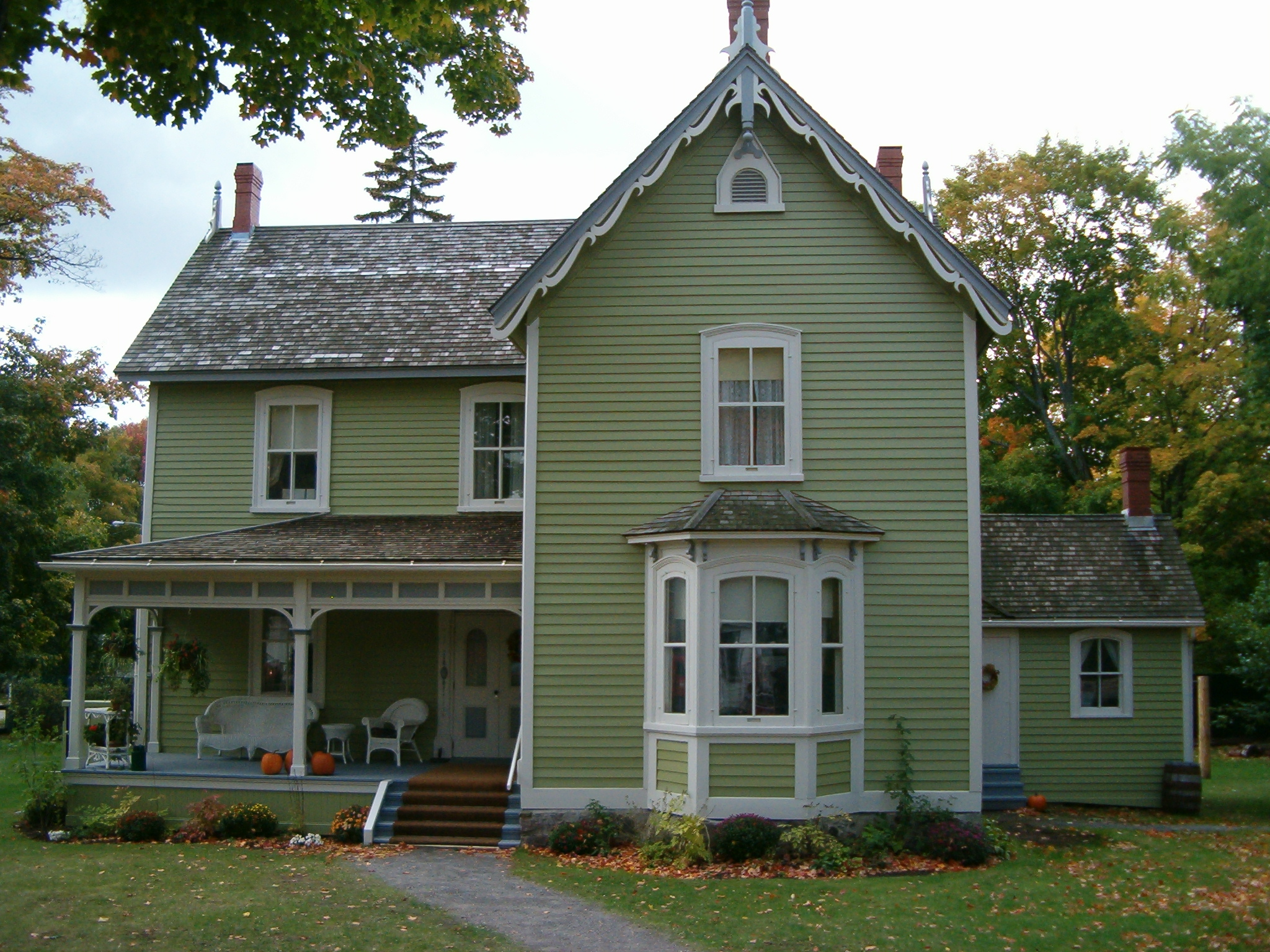
- Interactive map of Bethune Memorial House
- Location: 235 John Street North; Gravenhurst, Ontario
- Elevation: 255 metres (837 ft)
- Founded: 1976
- Built: 1880
- Original use: Manse
- Current use: Museum
- Governing body: Parks Canada
- Website: Official website

National Historic Site of Canada
- Official name: Bethune Memorial House National Historic Site of Canada
- Designated: 1997/09/22

Bethune Memorial House (French: Maison commémorative Bethune), a National Historic Site of Canada in Gravenhurst, Ontario, Canada, commemorates the life and achievements of Dr. Norman Bethune. Impatient and restless, he was inspired by a sense of duty to others and a love of the outdoors. In Bethune, these characteristics were the seeds of a battlefront surgeon, communist, humanitarian, inventor, teacher and artist. The historic site explores the roots and examines his legacy. Dr. Bethune spent the last two years of his life in China, serving as a teacher and as a surgeon of the communist Eighth Route Army.

== History ==
The house was built in 1880 to serve as the manse of Knox Presbyterian Church. Malcolm Bethune became the minister of Knox Church in 1889 and, a year later, his son Norman was born in the manse. The Bethune family remained in Gravenhurst until 1893, when they moved to Beaverton, Ontario. Thereafter, the house was occupied by a succession of ministers.

In 1973, the house was purchased by the federal government's Department of External Affairs. Restoration of the building was subsequently undertaken by Parks Canada, which is now responsible for its operation.

In August 2002, then-Governor General Adrienne Clarkson visited the house and also unveiled a bronze statue of Dr. Bethune erected by the Town of Gravenhurst. The statue is located on Gravenhurst's main street, alongside the notable Opera House.

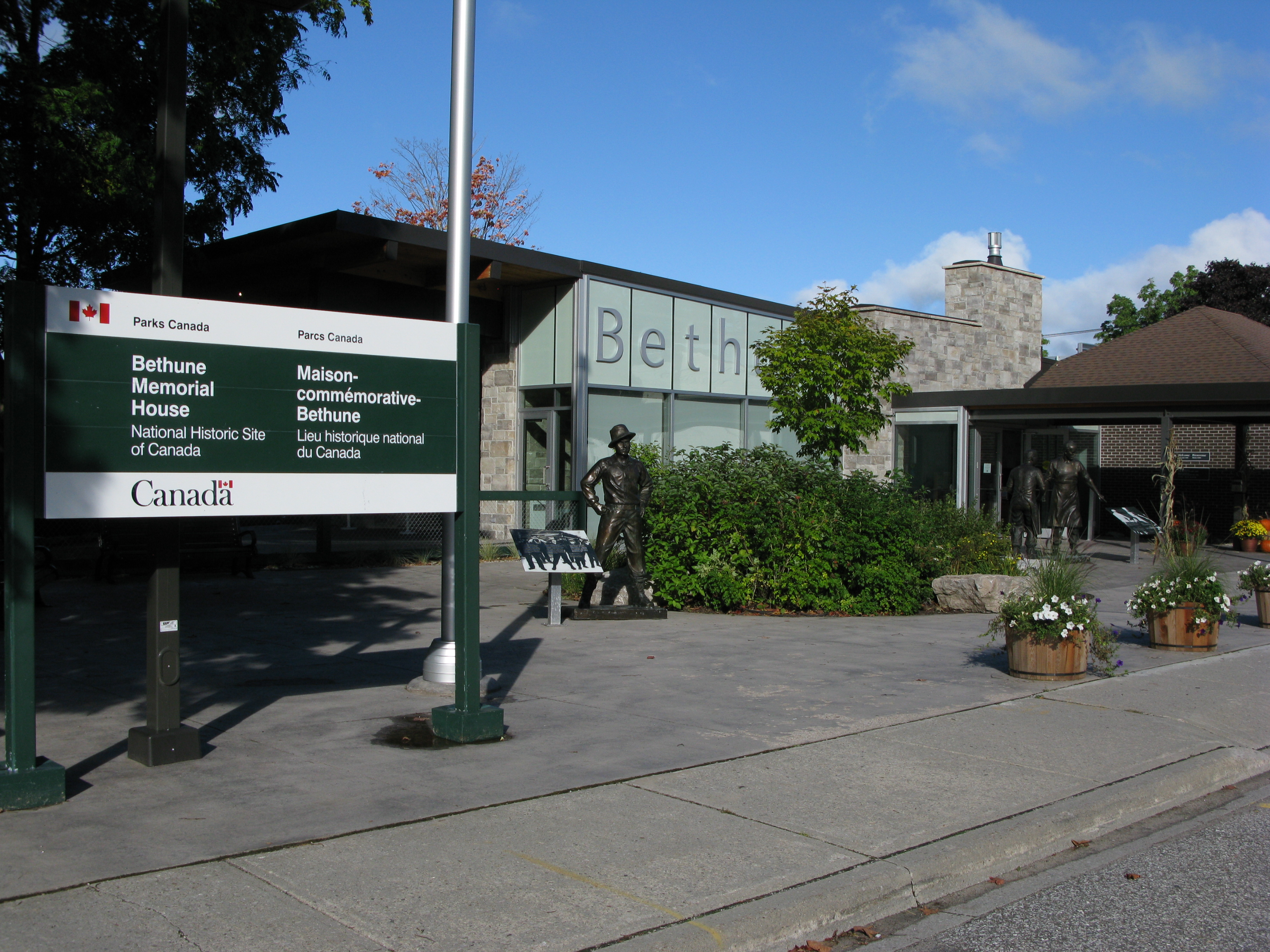
Current visitor centre for Bethune Memorial House, built in 2012 and opened in May 2013.

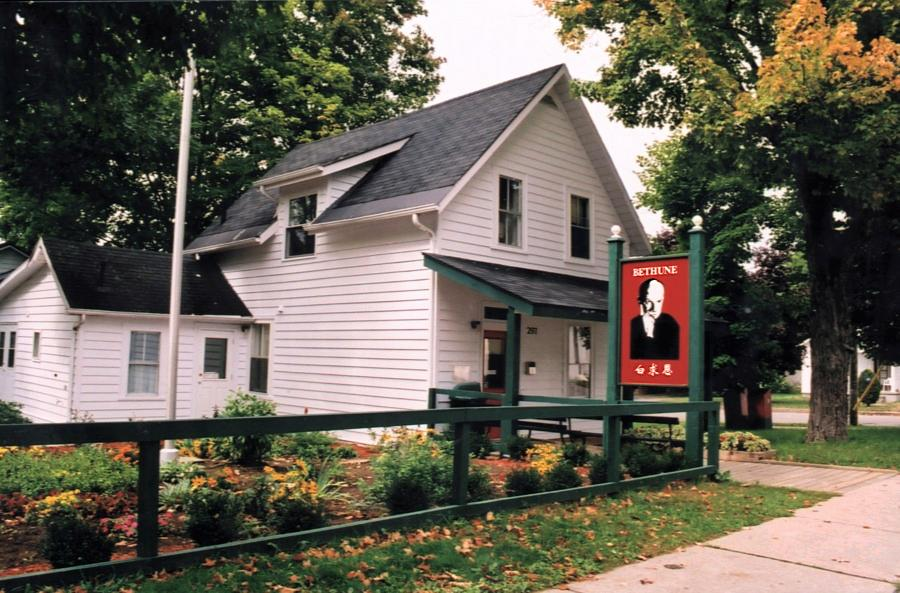
Bethune Memorial House former visitor centre, demolished in May 2011.

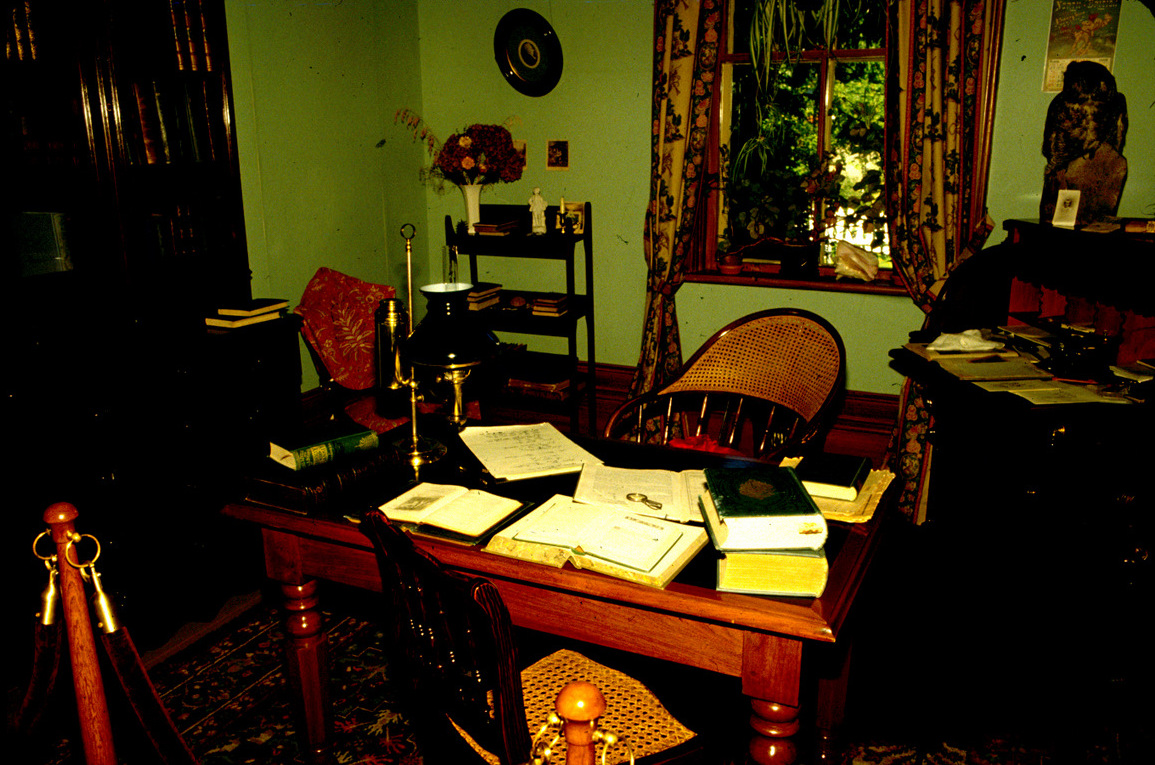
Malcolm Bethune's (Dr. Bethune's father) study in Bethune Memorial House

== Affiliations ==
The museum is affiliated with the Canadian Museums Association, the Canadian Heritage Information Network, and the Virtual Museum of Canada.

== See also ==
- Norman Bethune Memorial (Montreal)
