= Torrance Barrens =

Conservation area in Ontario, Canada

Torrance Barrens Conservation Reserve
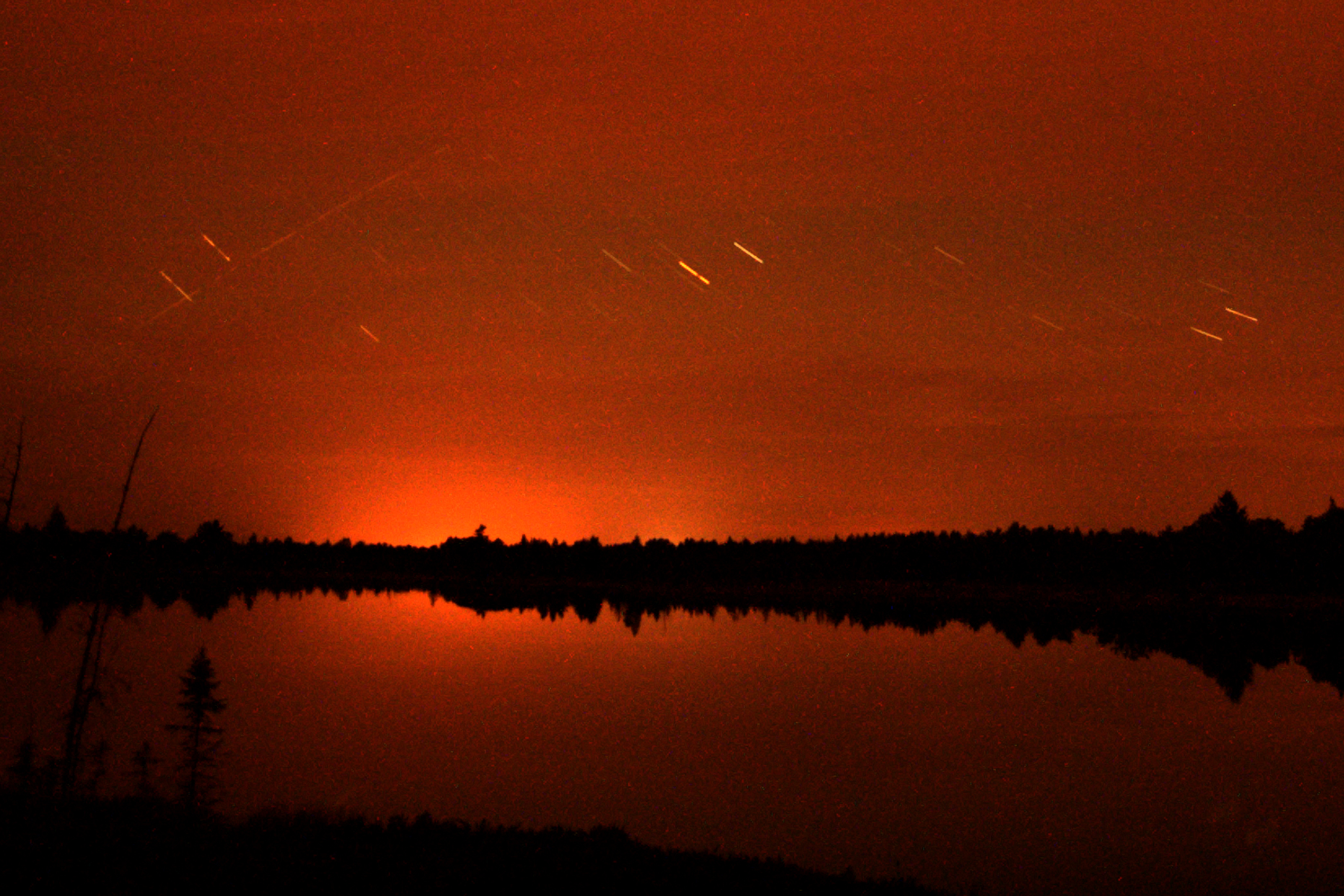
- Perseid Light Trails as seen from Torrance Barrens

- Location within Southern Ontario
- Location: District Municipality of Muskoka, Ontario, Canada
- Nearest town: Gravenhurst
- Coordinates: 44°57′06″N 79°30′11″W
- Area: 1,906 ha (7.36 sq mi)
- Elevation: 248 m (814 ft)
- Designated: June 1997
- Named for: Torrance, Ontario

The Torrance Barrens (officially Torrance Barrens Conservation Reserve) is a conservation area and dark-sky preserve in the District Municipality of Muskoka in Central Ontario, Canada. The reserve consists of Crown Lands in the municipalities of Gravenhurst and Muskoka Lakes. It is notable as the first dark-sky preserve in Canada and for its geological and environmental features.

== History ==
In 1870, the Musquash Colonization Road was built, connecting Gravenhurst to Musquash Falls (now Bala). This road was the first in the area and some segments are still in use. However, the portion bisecting through the reserve is no longer in use and is a separate nature reserve, the 195 acres (79 ha) Musquash Road Nature Reserve.

In 1992, its significant natural values were identified, and additional studies described its importance in aesthetics and recreation. In 1995, the Ministry of Natural Resources proposed to protect the area and public consultations began.

The reserve was established in June 1997 under Ontario Regulation 259/97, and as a result of its favourable conditions for astronomy viewing, it was recognized as a permanent dark-sky preserve in 1999, the first in Canada.

== Geology ==
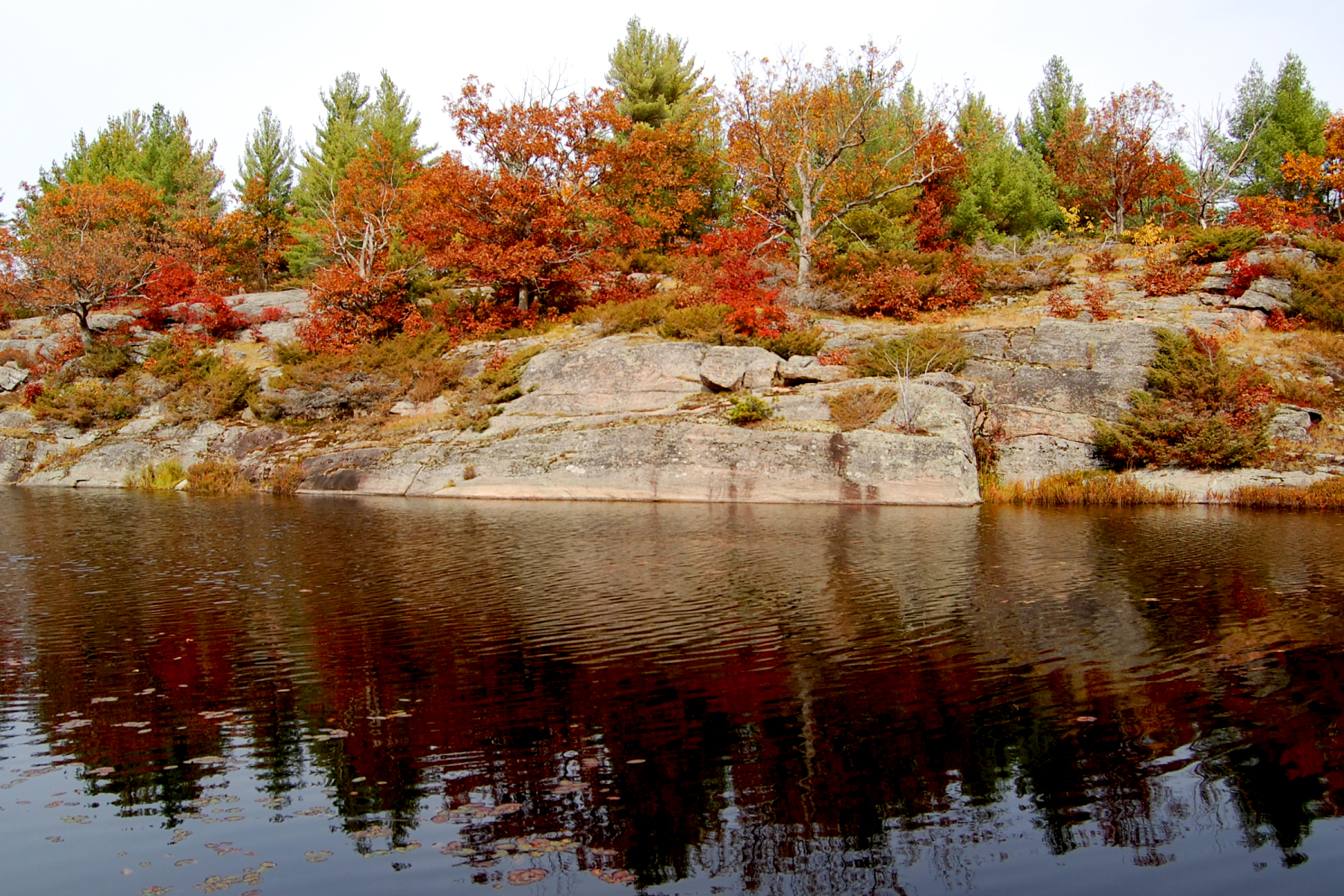
Pond at the Torrance Barrens

The reserve straddles the edges of the Moon River Domain (Parry Sound Terrane) and the Go Home Domain (Algonquin Terrane), structural subdivisions of the Grenville province of the Grenville orogeny. It is characterized by low elongated ridges of Precambrian bedrock with little topsoil and scattered boulders. The ridges are granitic gneisses and migmatites of varied origins, separated by wetland, ponds, and peat-filled hollows.

The geology represents the Grenville Province continental accretion theme and is therefore locally significant.

== Environment ==
While the Torrance Barrens are part of an intermittent band of granite barrens stretching from Eastern Ontario to Georgian Bay, it is rare this far south in Ontario, and therefore the environment and flora of the reserve are unique and distinct in its location.

=== Flora ===
The vegetation can be divided into three types: acidic rock barrens, wetlands, and upland forests. The barrens have herbaceous shrubs and graminoid heaths, with pockets of white and red pine, white and red oak, aspen and birch. The wetland consists of swamps, fen, and marshes with graminoid shrubs and peat, as well as mixed hardwood and coniferous trees. The upland forests are characterized by mature mixed coniferous and deciduous trees. In all, 463 native vascular plant species have been identified in Torrance Barrens. This includes twelve Atlantic coastal plain species which are found in Canada in only two areas and are 500 to 1,000 kilometres (310 to 620 mi) from their home ranges.

Of the 463 species, 5 are rare and threatened: lance-leaved grapefern (Botrychium lanceolatum), panic grass (Panicum spretum), southern twayblade (Listera australis), white-fringed orchid (Platanthera blephariglottis), and halberd-leaved tearthumb (Polygonum arifolium).

Of the 12 Atlantic coastal plain species, there are 4 rare and threatened species: snail-seed pondweed (Potamogeton bicupulatus), Carolina yellow-eyed grass (Xyris difformis), marsh St. John's wort (Triadenum virginicum) and Virginia meadow-beauty (Rhexia virginica).

=== Fauna ===
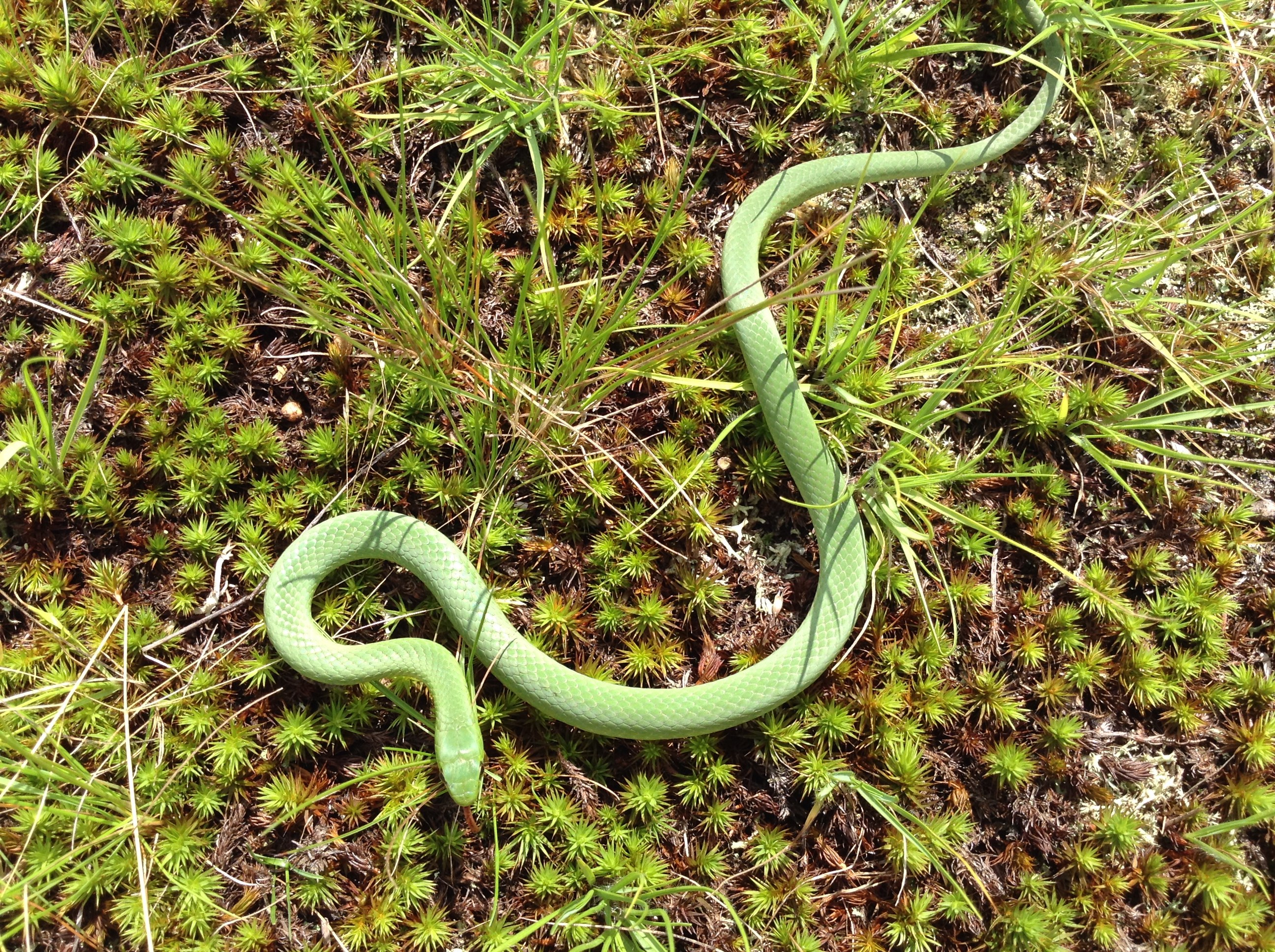
Smooth green snake (Opheodrys vernalis) at Torrance Barrens

94 bird species, 19 mammal species, 28 butterfly species, 8 dragonfly species, and 18 reptile/amphibian species have been identified in the reserve.

Of the 18 reptile/amphibian species present, 2 are of special concern: five-lined skink (Eumeces fasciatus – Ontario's only lizard) and eastern ribbonsnake (Thamnophis saurita); and 3 are threatened: eastern Massasauga rattlesnake (Sistrurus catenatus catenatus), eastern hognose snake (Heterodon platirhinos) and Blanding's turtle (Emydoidea blandingii).

The eastern bluebird and Cooper's hawk, both rare in Canada, can be found at Torrance Barrens.

== Dark-sky preserve ==
The location and topography make the Torrance Barrens a suitable location for night-time sky viewing opportunities. There is no light pollution of nearby cities, and the reserve is mostly surrounded by undeveloped private lands and other parks, allowing it to retain the natural darkness of the night. Because of its barren bedrock, telescopes and cameras can be stationed on a solid base, immune to vibrations. Furthermore, the natural open spaces and lack of surrounding high hills provide an unobstructed panorama of the sky and horizon.

Owing to these favourable conditions, the Andromeda Galaxy is visible with the naked eye from the Torrance Barrens, and with a simple telescope, the cloud bands of Jupiter and the rings of Saturn can be seen.
