= Jean Ewen =

Canadian nurse (1911–1987)

Jean Ewen (Chinese name 于清莲) (December 24, 1911 – October 31, 1987) was a Canadian nurse who worked with Chinese communist soldiers during the 1930s.

Ewen was born in Scotland in 1911, but immigrated with her family to Canada as a child, where they settled in Saskatchewan. Ewen studied nursing in Winnipeg, graduating in 1931. In 1932, she moved to China to work as a medical missionary with the Franciscan Fathers, and learned Mandarin. Following a brief return to Canada in 1937, Ewen accompanied Doctor Norman Bethune when he came to China to offer medical aid to the communist forces, serving as his interpreter and assistant.

Ewen came from a family of communist supporters, but she was opposed to mixing politics and medicine. In her memoir China Nurse 1932–1939, she described the horrors of front-line surgery during the Second Sino-Japanese War. In addition to nursing the wounded, she trained nurses and "barefoot doctors" and taught sanitation, for which the Chinese government awarded her the Silver Shield. Ewen eventually left China, traveling south to Hong Kong, and returned to Canada.

Shortly after her return, she married John Kozar, a friend of her two brothers when they served in the Spanish Civil War. They had two children, Laura and Tom (though Laura was conceived while Ewen was still in China, and was born just after Kozar and Ewen were married). Kozar was killed when his ship was sunk in 1942, and Ewen subsequently married Mike Kovitch in 1946, with whom she had a third child, Michael.

China Nurse, Ewen's memoir, was published in 1981. In later editions, it was called Canadian Nurse in China. Ewen died in October 1987, and her ashes were returned to China in 1988.
