= Étienne Guy =

Étienne Guy (February 16, 1774 – December 29, 1820) was a surveyor and political figure in Lower Canada.

He was born in Montreal in 1774, the son of Pierre Guy, studied at the Collège Saint-Raphaël and then spent over a year at the College of New Jersey. In 1796, he was elected to the Legislative Assembly of Lower Canada in Montreal County. Guy qualified to practice as a surveyor in 1798. He also served in the local militia during the War of 1812, later becoming lieutenant colonel.

He died at Montreal in 1820. His brother, Louis Guy, practiced as a surveyor and notary and was a member of the legislative council. Rue Guy and Guy–Concordia metro station in downtown Montreal are named for Guy.
