= Kahshe Lake =

Lake in Ontario, Canada

- Location within Ontario
- Location: Muskoka, Ontario
- Coordinates: 44°52′N 79°16′W
- Basin countries: Canada

Kahshe Lake is a lake in the Muskoka region in Ontario, Canada near Gravenhurst.

Kahshe is the fourth largest lake in the region and has approximately 600 cottages. The lake is tea-coloured, containing a high level of dissolved organics.

== Name ==
The lake name Ka-shesheb-agam-ag is a First Nations term that may mean 'where there are-ducks-lake-place', thus 'Lake of Many Ducks'; compare Ojibwe jishib 'duck'; the following are spurious (Carl Masthay, St. Louis, 2009): Kah-Lake, She-Many, Bog-Ducks, a-and, Mog or Maug-Loons, therefore Lake of Many Many Ducks and Loons (researched by Ken Little). Other people claim that it means Lake of Many Islands or "Lake of Healing Waters".

== Description ==
The west side of Kahshe Lake is shallow while the east side is deep. Both areas have many shallow rock hazards with no marker buoys, though in recent years a community initiative to install rock markers across the lake has helped with rock hazard visibility. A public beach, boating docks and a boat launch are located off North Kahshe Lake Road.

== Events ==
Kahshe Lake has been featured on fishing shows and in a Tim Hortons television commercial. Residents have been staging the Kahshe Lake regatta, for over fifty years. Lake Kahshe also has barn dances, a Labour Day concert, and the Rockhaven Inn craft sale. As well as the bi-yearly Muskoka Seaflea Fleafest event.

== See also ==
- List of lakes in Ontario
