= Gerald Tannebaum =

American actor

Gerald Tannebaum (simplified Chinese: 谭宁邦; traditional Chinese: 譚寧邦; pinyin: Tán Níngbāng, 1917 – 9 March 2001) was an American humanitarian and actor in China. He was born in Baltimore, Maryland, and died in Santa Barbara, California, of Parkinson's disease.

== Early career ==
After graduation from Northwestern University in 1939, Gerald "Gerry" Tannebaum worked in advertising. In 1942, he was commissioned in the US Army. In 1945, he was in charge of the US Armed Forces radio station in Shanghai, China. In 1946, he left the Army and stayed to work as executive director of the Chinese Welfare Institute (CWI, 中国福利会) under Soong Ching-ling (Madame Sun Yat-sen), with whom he reportedly fell in love.

== Acting in China ==
This got him involved with various theatrical projects of the institute. In 1947, he founded the first Children's Theater in China (Shanghai). He played foreign roles in Chinese films, usually negative English characters, such as Lancelot Dent. Although very popular with Chinese film audiences, his roles were limited by his refusal to portray negative American characters. He held major roles in seven Chinese films. His best-known film role was in 1964's biographical account of the great Canadian internationalist Dr. Norman Bethune, and his life in China. (Bethune was one of many Westerners who came to China to resist the Japanese. The film, however, did not tell of Bethune's giving up his comfortable life as a wealthy doctor in Canada, and choosing to go to the front line.)

In 1962, he married Shanghai People's Art Theater actress Chen Yuanchi.

In 1969, he wrote a book, The Great Proletarian Cultural Revolution: What Really Did Happen in China?, which was published in Sydney.

Tannebaum remained an advisor with the Institute until 1971. He taught English language and American literature at several of Shanghai's leading universities.

After the US and China resumed official contacts in 1972, Tannebaum and his wife moved to the US, settling in California in January 1973. Chen was the first PRC citizen to immigrate to the US on a permanent visa. From 1973 until his death, he lectured at a number of colleges and universities across the United States.
