= Gravenhurst, Ontario =

Gravenhurst
- Town (lower-tier)
- Town of Gravenhurst
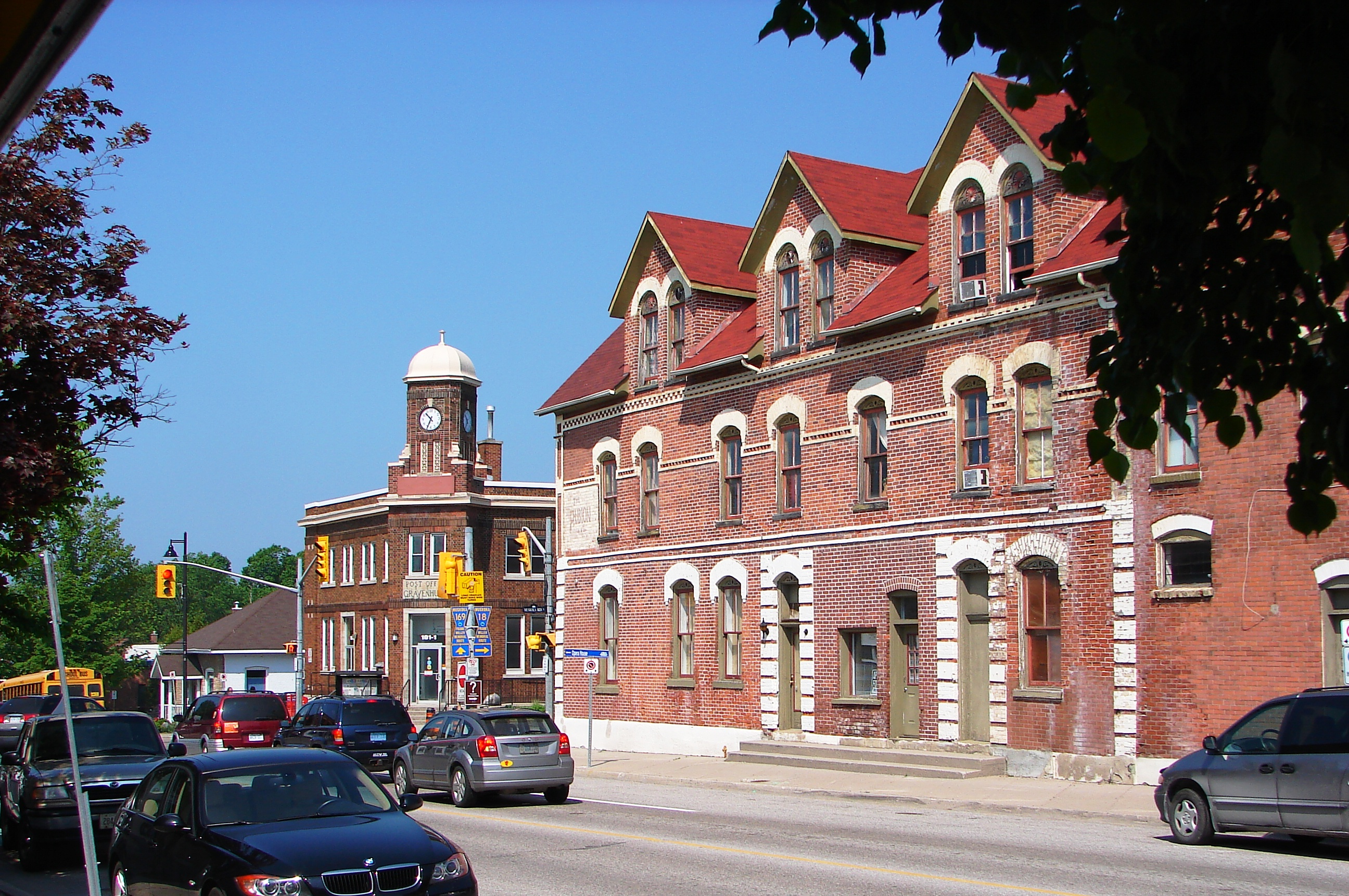
- Gravenhurst Main street
- Motto(s): Wealth & Industry
- Location within Southern Ontario
- Coordinates: 44°55′N 79°22′W
- Country: Canada
- Province: Ontario
- District: Muskoka
- Settled: 1860s
- Incorporated: 1887

Government
  - Mayor: Heidi Lorenz
  - Fed. riding: Parry Sound-Muskoka
  - Prov. riding: Parry Sound—Muskoka

Area
  - Land: 489.11 km^{2} (188.85 sq mi)
  - Urban: 6.32 km^{2} (2.44 sq mi)

Population (2021)
  - Total: 13,157
  - Density: 26.9/km^{2} (70/sq mi)
  - Urban: 5,789
  - Urban density: 916.1/km^{2} (2,373/sq mi)
- Time zone: UTC-5 (EST)
  - Summer (DST): UTC-4 (EDT)
- Postal code: P1P
- Area codes: 705, 249
- Highways: Highway 11; Highway 169
- Website: www.gravenhurst.ca

Gravenhurst is a town in the District of Muskoka, loacated in Ontario, Canada. It is located approximately 15 kilometres (9.3 mi) south of Bracebridge, Ontario. The town centre borders Lake Muskoka and Gull Lake. Kahshe Lake is situated 10 kilometres (6.2 mi) south of the town.

== History ==
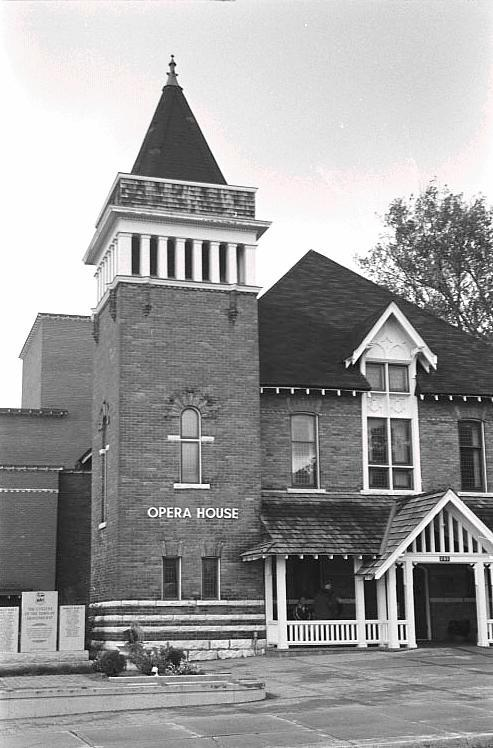
Opera House in Gravenhurst

Gravenhurst was first known as McCabes Landing, named for its first settler James McCabe and his wife Letitia Simington, and later as Sawdust City. Gravenhurst was named by a postal official who was reading Gravenhurst or Thoughts on Good and Evil, a treatise by William Smith. It was incorporated in 1887.

Gravenhurst's economic prosperity stemmed from the construction of a colonization road in the 1850s. Steamboating on the Muskoka lakes began in the 1860s. The town was located strategically at the northern terminus of the Toronto, Simcoe and Muskoka Junction Railway. The town is positioned as the "Gateway to Muskoka".

The nearby Muldrew Lake was named after the lake's next settler, William Hawthorne Muldrew. He was the principal of Gravenhurst's first high school in 1894. In 1901 he published a book called Sylvan Ontario, A Guide to Our Native Trees and Shrubs. It was the first book published on this subject in Ontario, and the drawings were his own. All the different types of trees and shrubs of Muskoka could be seen at the school, as he transplanted many of the specimens from Muldrew Lake.

In 1942 the Royal Norwegian Air Force moved their training camp (Little Norway) from Toronto Islands Airport to a Muskoka airfield near Gravenhurst. They remained in Gravenhurst almost to the end of World War II in 1945.

Effective January 1, 1971, the Town of Gravenhurst was amalgamated with the Townships of Morrison and Ryde, as well as parts of the townships of Medora, Wood, and Muskoka, as part of the district's restructuring.

=== Camp 20 ===
Between 1940 and 1946, Gravenhurst was home to a German prisoner-of-war camp known as Camp 20. The camp is also referred to as Camp Calydor and Muskoka Officer’s Club. The camp had a swimming area fenced in on Lake Muskoka where the prisoners could bathe. By the end of the first summer, Camp 20 held 489 prisoners. They were taken around Gravenhurst to work on various projects. The prisoners of war built a set of stone steps leading down to the waterfront which can still be seen at Gull Lake Park today. They also built a lighthouse in the park.

The camp had its own gardens where the prisoners would grow their own vegetables and they were able to smoke sausages from the local animals. Some prisoners of war said that they became friends with the guards, who tried to make the place as friendly as possible to avoid escape attempts. Many prisoners worked outside of the camp and in lumber camps and received a small wage. Many had relationships with locals.

Ulrich Steinhilper, a German fighter ace who shot down five Royal Air Force airplanes during the Battle of Britain before himself being shot down, was one of the prisoners; he made at least five attempts to escape from various camps, his last two attempts being from Gravenhurst.

Today, all that remains of Camp 20 is concrete pillars, a fire hydrant, and the outline of a fence. There is an information kiosk at the end of Lorne Street where visitors can go to get more information on the camp.

== Demographics ==
In the 2021 Census of Population conducted by Statistics Canada, Gravenhurst had a population of 13,157 living in 5,496 of its 8,271 total private dwellings, a change of 6.9% from its 2016 population of 12,311. With a land area of 489.11 km^{2} (188.85 sq mi), it had a population density of 26.9/km^{2} (69.7/sq mi) in 2021.

Canada census – Gravenhurst community profile

	2021	2016	2011
Population	13,157 (+6.9% from 2016)	12,311 (+2.1% from 2011)	12,055 (+5.9% from 2006)
Land area	489.11 km^{2} (188.85 sq mi)	518.06 km^{2} (200.02 sq mi)	518.59 km^{2} (200.23 sq mi)
Population density	26.9/km^{2} (70/sq mi)	23.8/km^{2} (62/sq mi)	23.2/km^{2} (60/sq mi)
Median age	53.6 (M: 52.0, F: 55.2)	52.5 (M: 51.4, F: 53.9)
Private dwellings	8,271 (total) 5,496 (occupied)	8,302 (total)	8,202 (total)
Median household income	$73,500	$59,648

References: 2021 2016 2011

Historical census populations – Gravenhurst, Ontario

Year	Pop.	±%
1871	400	—
1881	1,015	+153.8%
1891	1,848	+82.1%
1901	2,146	+16.1%
1911	1,624	−24.3%
1921	1,478	−9.0%

Year	Pop.	±%
1931	1,864	+26.1%
1941	2,122	+13.8%
1951	3,005	+41.6%
1961	3,077	+2.4%
1971	7,133	+131.8%
1981	8,532	+19.6%

Year	Pop.	±%
1991	9,988	+17.1%
2001	10,899	+9.1%
2006	11,046	+1.3%
2011	12,055	+9.1%
2016	12,311	+2.1%
2021	13,157	+6.9%

2011 census population corrected by Statistics Canada. Population counts are not adjusted for boundary changes.
Source: Statistics Canada

Age Structure (2021):

- 0–14 years: 11.4%
- 15–64 years: 59.1%
- 65 years and over: 29.5%

== Attractions ==
Parts of the Queen Elizabeth II Wildlands Provincial Park and Torrance Barrens conservation area are in Gravenhurst.

=== The Muskoka Wharf ===
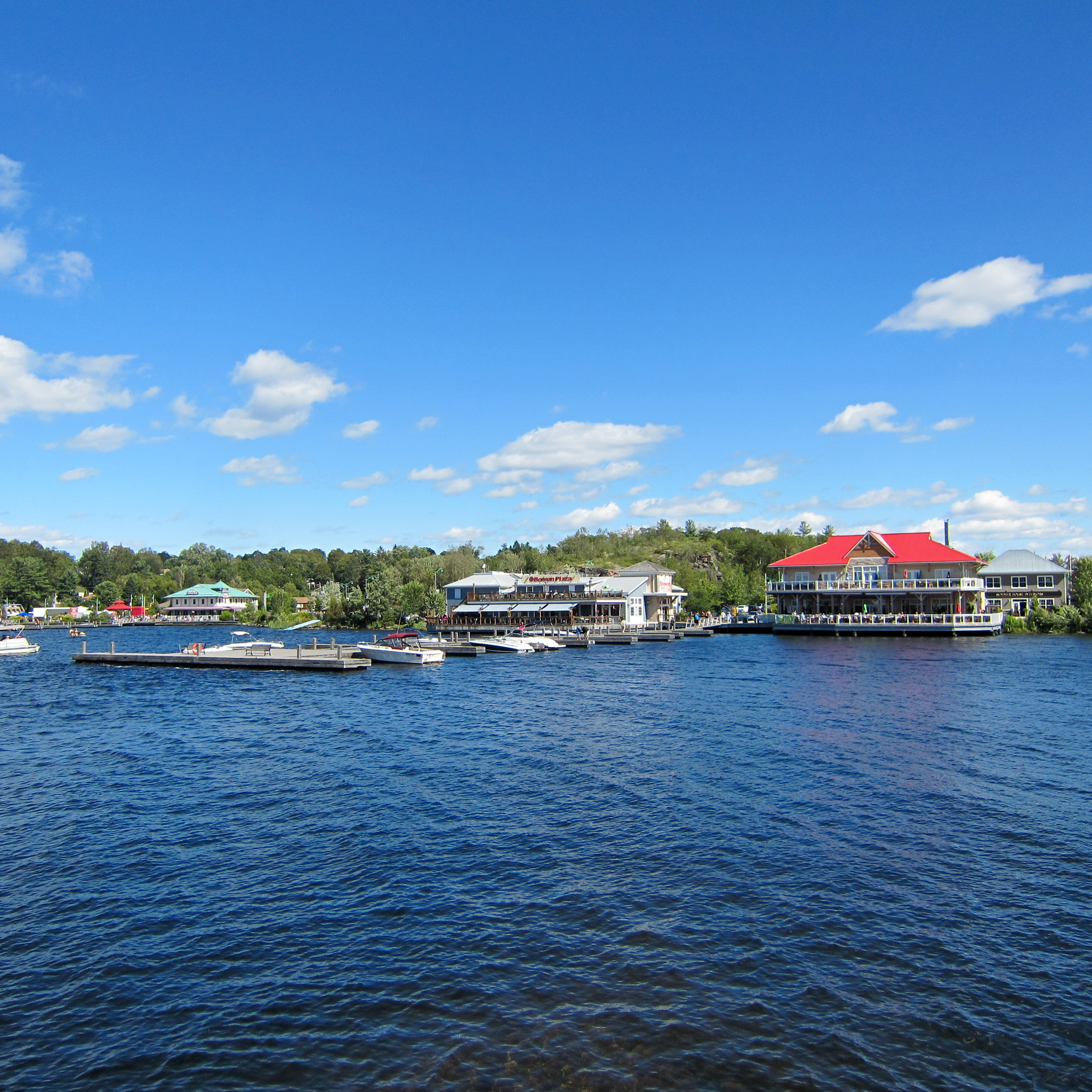
View of Muskoka Wharf from over the bay

The Muskoka Wharf, located on Lake Muskoka, was completed in 2005. The project cost $170 million and spans 89 acres. Before the new development was built, the wharf was used for the lumber and boat-building industries. It was also the entry point to the lakes.

The wharf hosts a number of events in the summer, including Pirate Fest and the Gravenhurst farmers' market.

=== Winter carnival ===
Every year Gravenhurst puts on a winter carnival for the community. Events at the carnival including donut-eating contests, snow yoga, ball hockey, a polar dip, and arm wrestling. The town hosts several dances, as well as fireworks for the closing ceremony at the Muskoka Wharf.

== Transportation ==
Gravenhurst is called the "Gateway to the Muskoka Lakes" and has a large gate bearing this message hanging over Muskoka District Road 169, the main road leading into town from Highway 11. The gate was removed but then rebuilt in 2009 and stands at the south end of town. It is the home port of the RMS Segwun, the oldest vessel powered by a working steam engine in North America.

Ontario Northland Motor Coach Services provides inter-city bus service to Gravenhurst along its Toronto to North Bay routes. The nearby Muskoka Airport has scheduled flights to Billy Bishop Toronto City Airport and also serves general aviation.

The former Gravenhurst railway station was served by Ontario Northland Railway's Northlander passenger train until the train was discontinued in 2012; it is currently vacant.

== Education ==
Starting in 1958, Gravenhurst was home to the Ontario Fire College. The college was run by the Province of Ontario, under the Fire Marshall's Office, and offered training and education programs based on the Ontario Fire Service Standards. Courses were available to members of any Ontario municipal fire department. The Ontario Fire College was closed in 2021.

Public education consists of Gravenhurst High School and two elementary schools administered by the Trillium Lakelands District School Board.

== Notable residents ==
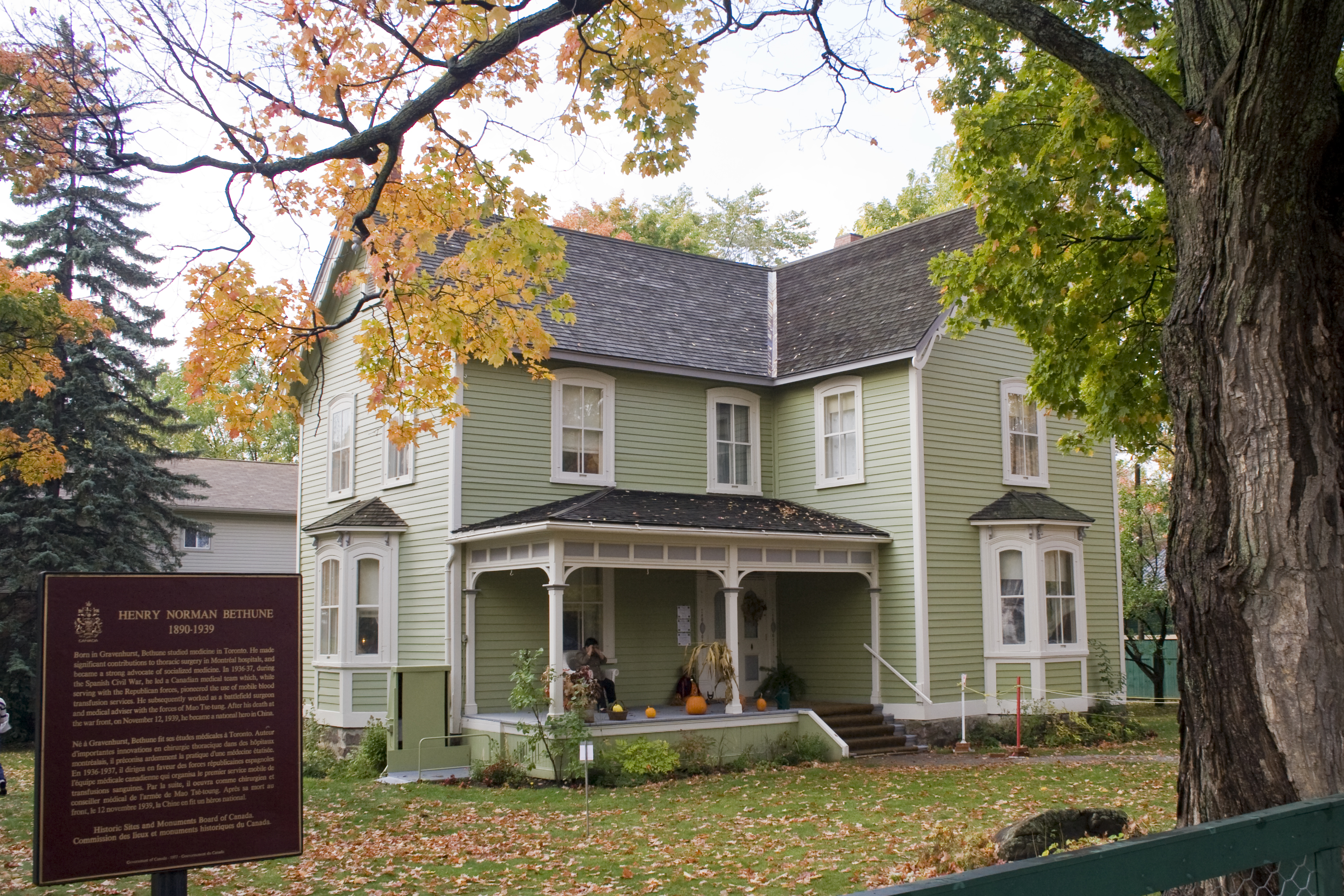
Bethune Memorial House

- Norman Bethune, a physician who was born in Gravenhurst. His family home, known as the Bethune Memorial House, has been preserved as a Canadian National Historic Site.
- Steve Barnes, a former professional ice hockey player who played in the British Hockey League as a member of the Manchester Storm.
- Graeme Murray, a Paralympic Games medalist and member of the Men's National Para-Ice Hockey Team.

== See also ==
- List of towns in Ontario
- List of townships in Ontario
- List of population centres in Ontario
