= Quartier Concordia =

- Neighbourhood
- Sir George Williams Campus
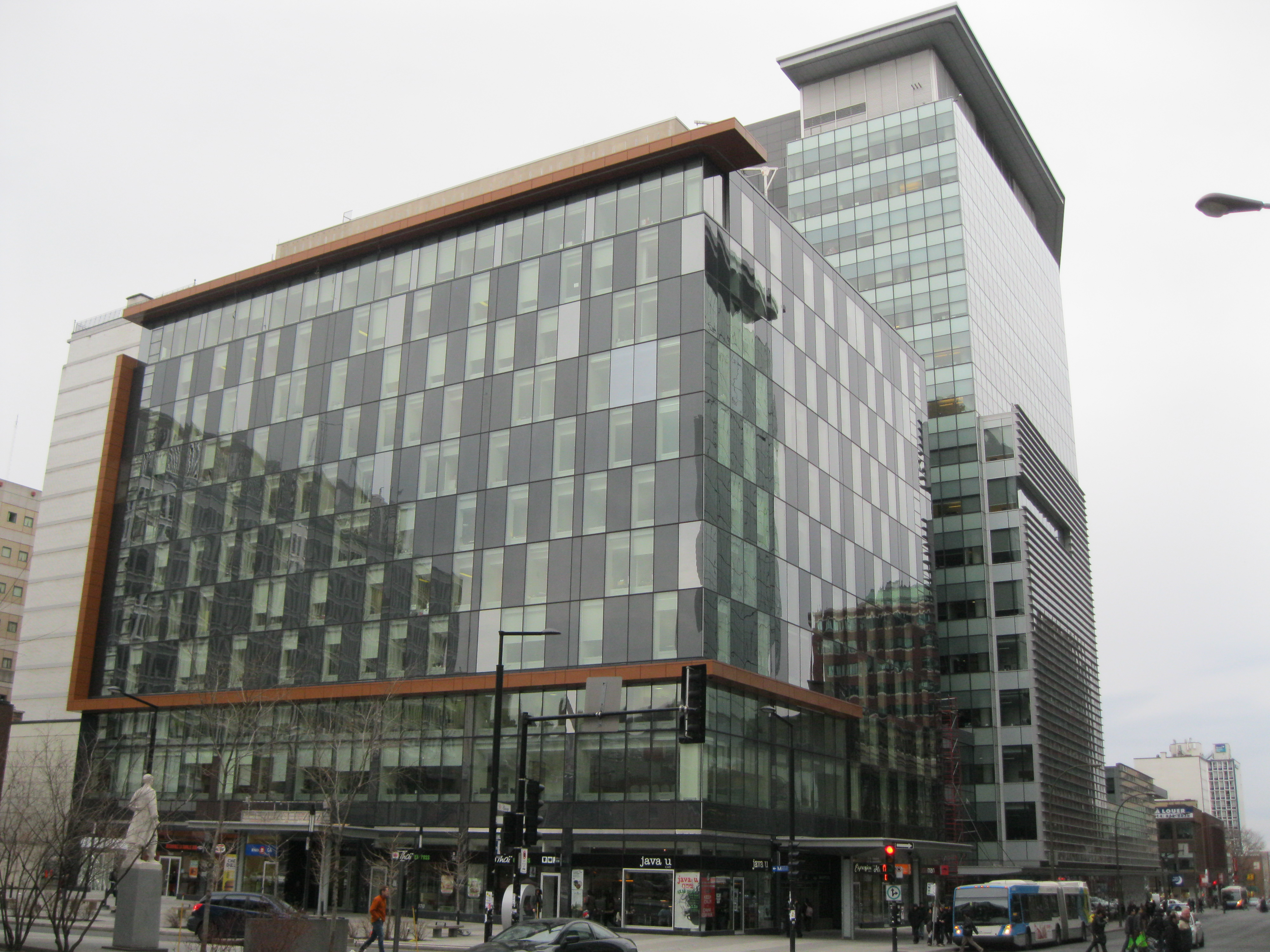

- Location of Quartier Concordia in Montreal
- Coordinates: 45°29′45″N 73°34′38″W
- Country: Canada
- Province: Quebec
- City: Montreal
- Borough: Ville-Marie
- Postal Code: H3G, H3H
- Area codes: 514, 438

Quartier Concordia is a neighbourhood redevelopment project centred on Concordia University's Sir George Williams campus in downtown Montreal, Quebec, Canada. Bordered by Sherbrooke Street, Saint-Mathieu Street, René Lévesque Boulevard and Bishop Street, the district is designed to be a green urban campus that will improve the use and quality of public places and spaces, student life on campus and transportation.

As part of the redesign, the small Norman Bethune Square has been redesigned and enlarged. Sidewalks in the area will also be widened, with additional trees.

Within the area is Grey Nuns Motherhouse, a student residence.

As of September 2010, a tunnel links the university's Hall and J.W. McConnell buildings with the Guy–Concordia metro station. The hallway was completed in Spring 2010. However, a project to create a green space on Mackay Street was put on hold.

== Building and architecture ==
Completed in 2009, the Quartier Concordia project was the result of an architectural competition held by Concordia in 2001, the winning designers of which were those at the architectural firm Kuwabara Payne McKenna Blumberg Architects (KPMB), in joint-venture with Fichten Soiferman et Associés Architectes. The project comprises a rehousing of three of Concordia's schools: Engineering, Computer Science (ENCS), Visual Arts (VA) and the John Molson School of Business (JMSB). The architectural plans for this project are held at the Canadian Centre for Architecture.
