= Guy Street =

Street in Montreal, Canada

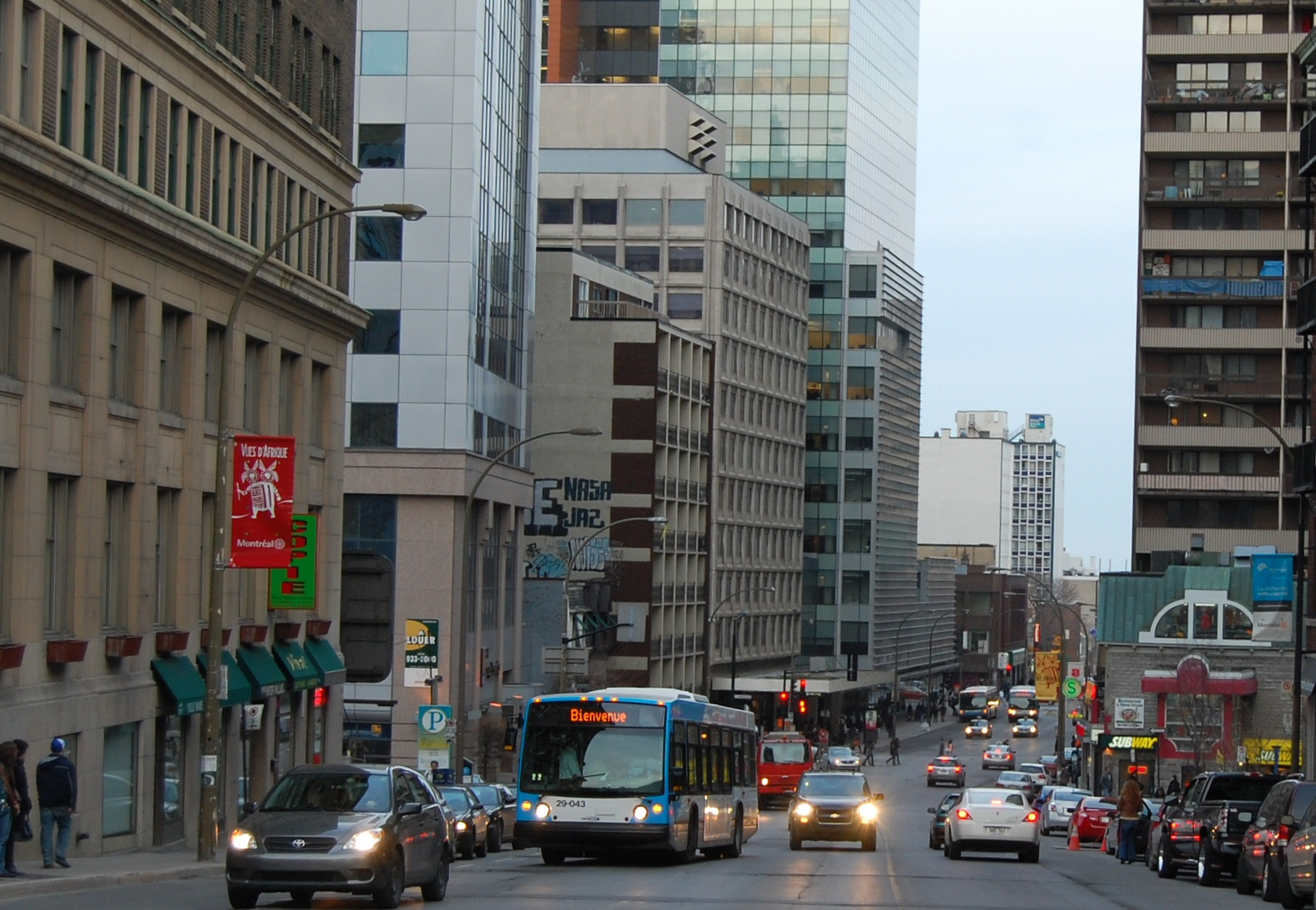
- Guy Street, looking south, in the Quartier Concordia.
- Interactive map of Guy Street
- Native name: rue Guy (French)
- Owner: City of Montreal
- Length: 1.5 km (0.93 mi)
- Location: Between Sherbrooke Street and William Street
- Coordinates: 45.495417°N 73.578669°W
- Major junctions: R-136 Ville-Marie Expressway; R-138 Sherbrooke Street

Construction
- Inauguration: August 30, 1817

Guy Street (officially in French: rue Guy) is a north-south street located in downtown Montreal, Quebec, Canada. Concordia University's Integrated Engineering, Computer Science and Visual Arts Complex is located on this street, as is the John Molson School of Business building. The street is home to the Guy–Concordia metro station. Guy Street runs through the Little Burgundy and Shaughnessy Village neighbourhoods, and the recently named Quartier Concordia district, before changing to Côte-des-Neiges Road, above Sherbrooke Street.

== History ==
The street was named on August 30, 1817 for Étienne Guy (1774–1820), a notary and member for the riding of Montreal in the Lower Canada Assembly. He gave the city the land for the street. Guy Street constituted the link between the Faubourg Saint-Joseph and Saint-Antoine.

Since 1869, the Grey Nuns have had a convent on Guy Street, at the corner of Dorchester Boulevard. The Grey Nuns' Motherhouse was purchased by Concordia University in 2007.

From 1898 to 1963, the street was home to Her Majesty's Theatre, a key performing arts venue.

== See also ==
- 165 Côte-des-Neiges
- 166 Queen Mary
- Structure gauge
