= Guy–Concordia station =

Montreal Metro station

Guy–Concordia
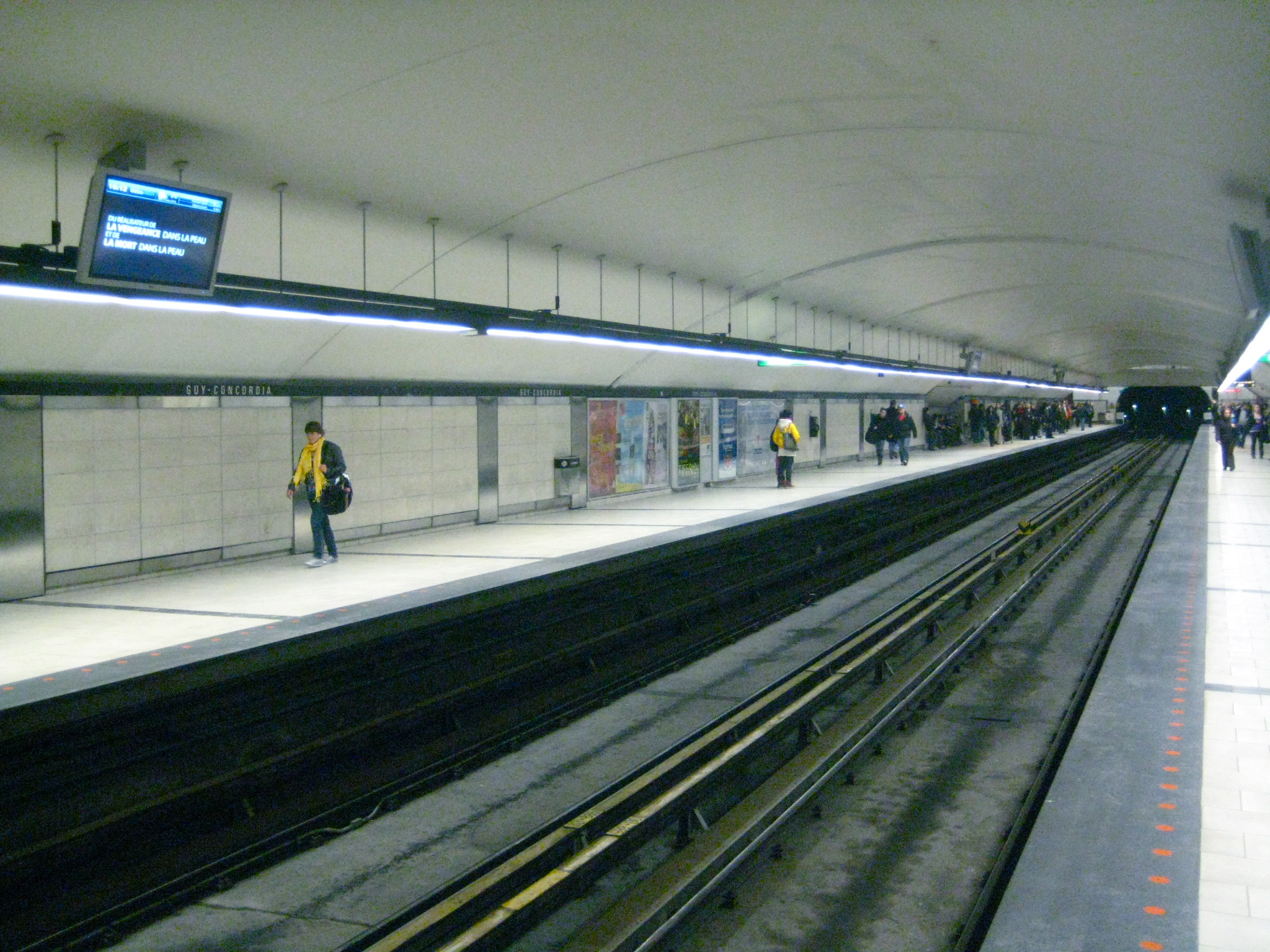

General information
- Location: 1801, boul. de Maisonneuve and 1445, Guy Street; Montreal, Quebec H3H 2L5; Canada
- Coordinates: 45°29′42″N 73°34′48″W
- Operator: Société de transport de Montréal
- Platforms: 2 side platforms
- Tracks: 2
- Connections: STM bus

Construction
- Depth: 19.2 metres (63 feet), 16th deepest
- Accessible: No
- Architect: J.A. Chicoine

Other information
- Fare zone: ARTM: A

History
- Opened: 14 October 1966

Passengers
- 2024: 7,781,601 ▲5.95%
- Rank: 3 of 68

Services
Preceding station	Montreal Metro	Following station
Atwater toward Angrignon	Green Line	Peel toward Honoré-Beaugrand
Location

Guy–Concordia station is a Montreal Metro station in the borough of Ville-Marie in Montreal, Quebec, Canada. It is operated by the Société de transport de Montréal (STM) and serves the Green Line. The station opened on October 14, 1966, as part of the original network of the Metro. It has consistently been one of the network's busiest stations, ranking fifth from 2000 to 2001, fourth from 2002 to 2007, third since 2008, and second since 2021.

== Overview ==
Before the station underwent renovations, the walls on the platform were covered in an orange-brown glazed tile pattern that still covers some of the walls in the access areas. These tile were replaced with a more modern style glazed ceramic white tiles, multicolored tile mosaics over the seats, and white stone floors.

Designed by J.A. Chicoine, it is a normal side platform station, built in tunnel with a transept, ticket hall, and access at each end. The platforms at Guy–Concordia are notably longer than the trains, and so a small section at each end of each platform is closed off by a gate for safety.

The eastern access contains shops and services, and an underground city connection to five Concordia University buildings: EV, MB, GM, LB and H buildings.

There are several shops and services on the mezzanine (where the ticket booth and the turnstiles are located) of the Guy-exit side of the station, including a Tim Hortons, a Chinese restaurant (Monsieur Gao), a "Belle Pizza", an Asian pastry shop (Cocobun), a hair salon, a cyber cafe, shoe store and another small cafe. The station platforms feature the MétroVision information screens which displays news, commercials, and the amount of time left until the next train arrives. This was the third station after Berri-UQAM and McGill to have the screens installed.

== Historical facts ==
Guy–Concordia was the first Metro station in Montreal to be designed by the city's architects in the early 1960s. Therefore, during its design phase it was used to determine many of the architectural standards that were used for the other stations of the initial Metro system.

As the building above the Guy entrance was constructed at the same time as the underlying Metro station, Guy–Concordia also became the first station to have several storeys of commercial spaces above it.

Guy–Concordia (or just Guy at the time) was part of the initial network that was officially opened on October 14, 1966. It was the second east-bound station on the Green Line (Atwater was the terminal station between the opening in 1966 and opening of the extension of the eastern part of the Green Line until the Angrignon terminal station on September 3, 1978).

== Origin of the name ==
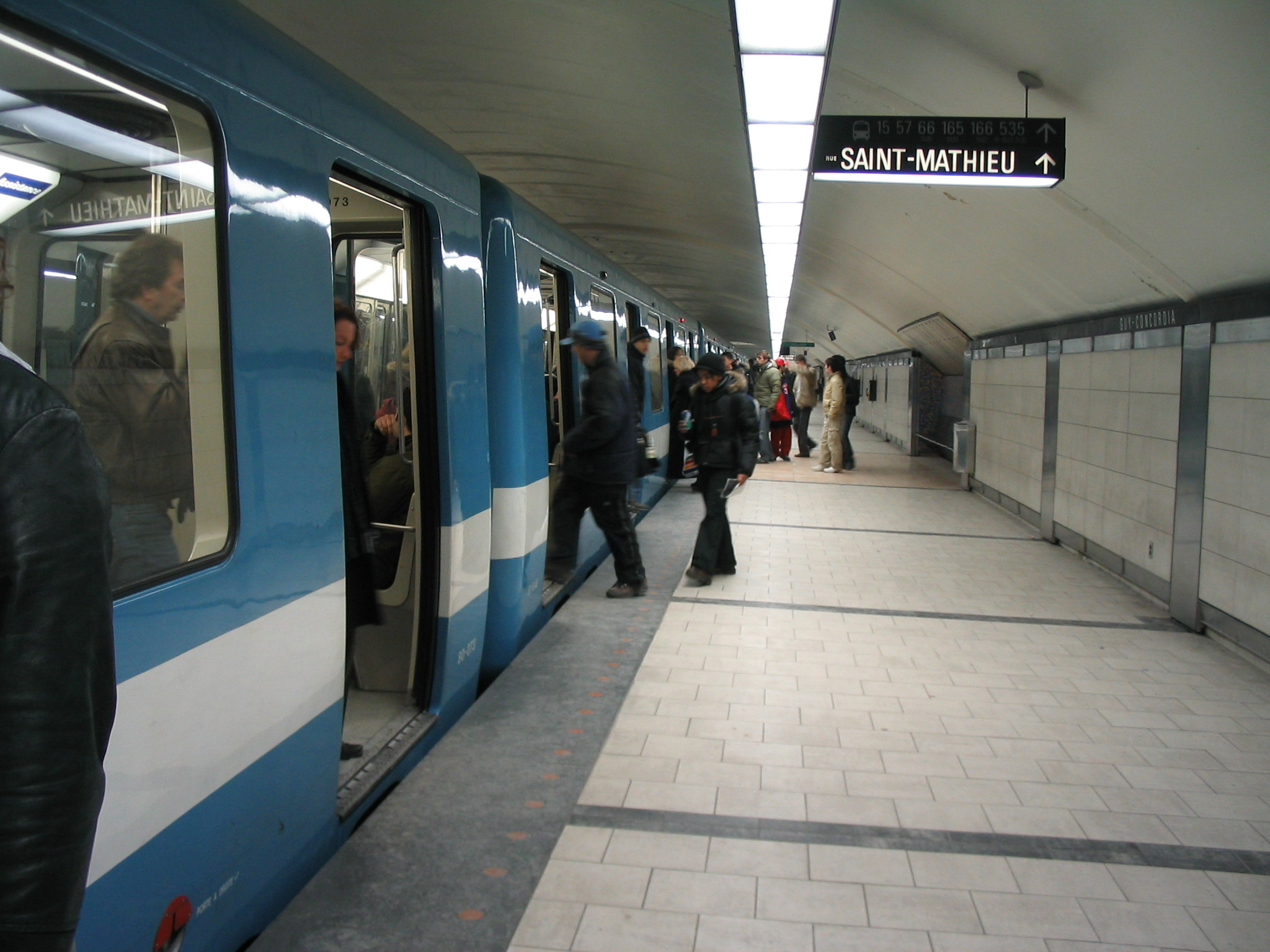
Platform at Guy–Concordia station

The station was originally called Guy after the street where it is located: Guy Street, which, in turn, takes its name from Étienne Guy who represented Montreal in the Legislative Assembly of Lower Canada and was the owned of the land through which the street runs.

On January 1, 1988, it was renamed Guy–Concordia to reflect the fact that it serves the Sir George Williams campus of Concordia University.

(Note that in French the name Guy is pronounced to rhyme with bee, whereas in English the name is usually pronounced to rhyme with high. The station is still sometimes referred to simply as Guy.)

== Underground connections ==
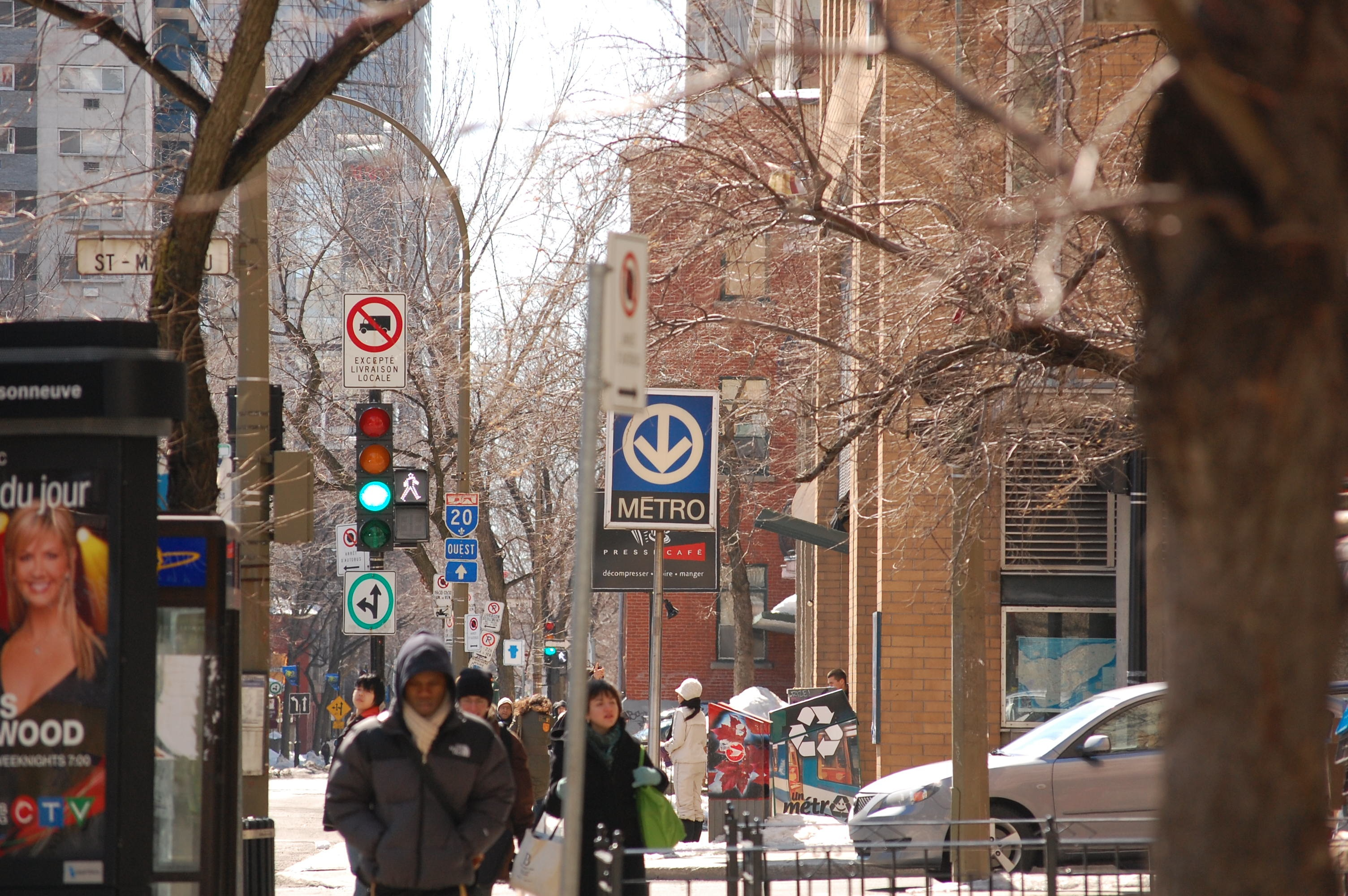
The entrance to Guy–Concordia station on the corner of De Maisonneuve Boulevard and Saint-Mathieu Street.

As of April 7, 2010, all of Concordia University's main buildings are connected through a system of underground passages leading to the Guy–Concordia station. A new tunnel was added to the already-existing tunnel that connects the Hall building with the LB building and leads to the station, exiting near the Uniprix store located near the turnstiles.

The new JMSB building, which opened to students in September 2009 features a tunnel stretching under Guy street that connects it with the EV building, opposite the location of the Le Gym. This major tunnel is 396 feet long and lined with ceramic tiles, with display panels for added visual interest.

== Renovations ==
In March 2012, the St-Mathieu exit of the station underwent renovation work that included new flooring, ceilings, walls, lighting, as well as sprinkler and electrical systems. The escalators also underwent an overhaul and motorized doors were added to the station's entrance and exit. This work represents the second major renovations performed to the station since its construction in 1966.

When work at the St-Mathieu Street exit was complete in August 2012, similar renovations commenced at the Guy Street entrance. This work included new flooring, ceilings, walls, as well as adding four turnstiles for increased traffic.

== Connecting bus routes ==
Société de transport de Montréal
No.	Route	Connects to	Service times / notes
66	The Boulevard		Daily
71	Pointe-Saint-Charles	De L'Église	Daily
165	Côte-des-Neiges	Ville-de-Mont-Royal; Côte-des-Neiges	Daily
166	Queen-Mary	Snowdon	Daily
369 ☾	Côte-des-Neiges	Namur; Côte-des-Neiges; Atwater	Night service

== Nearby points of interest ==
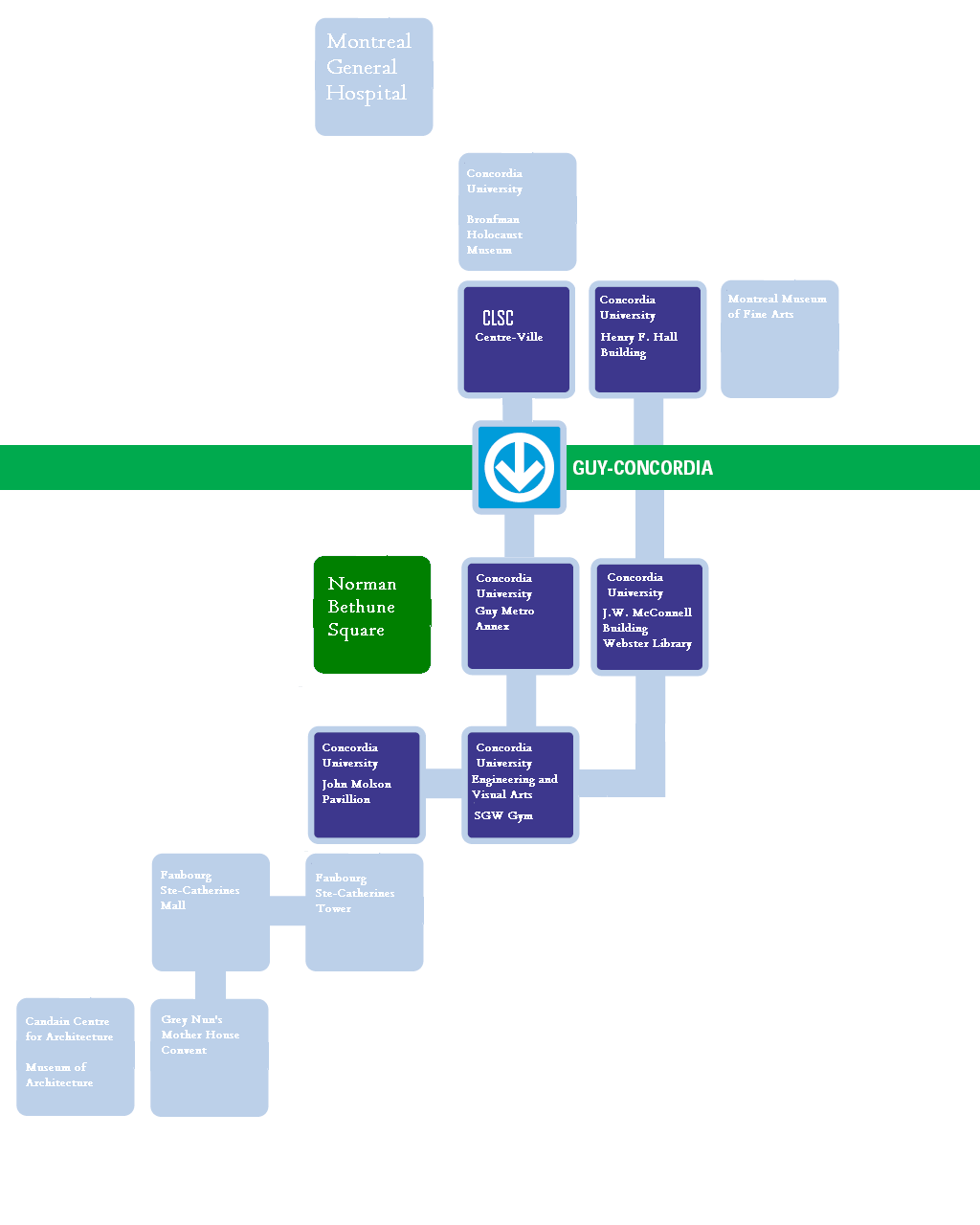
Environs of Guy–Concordia

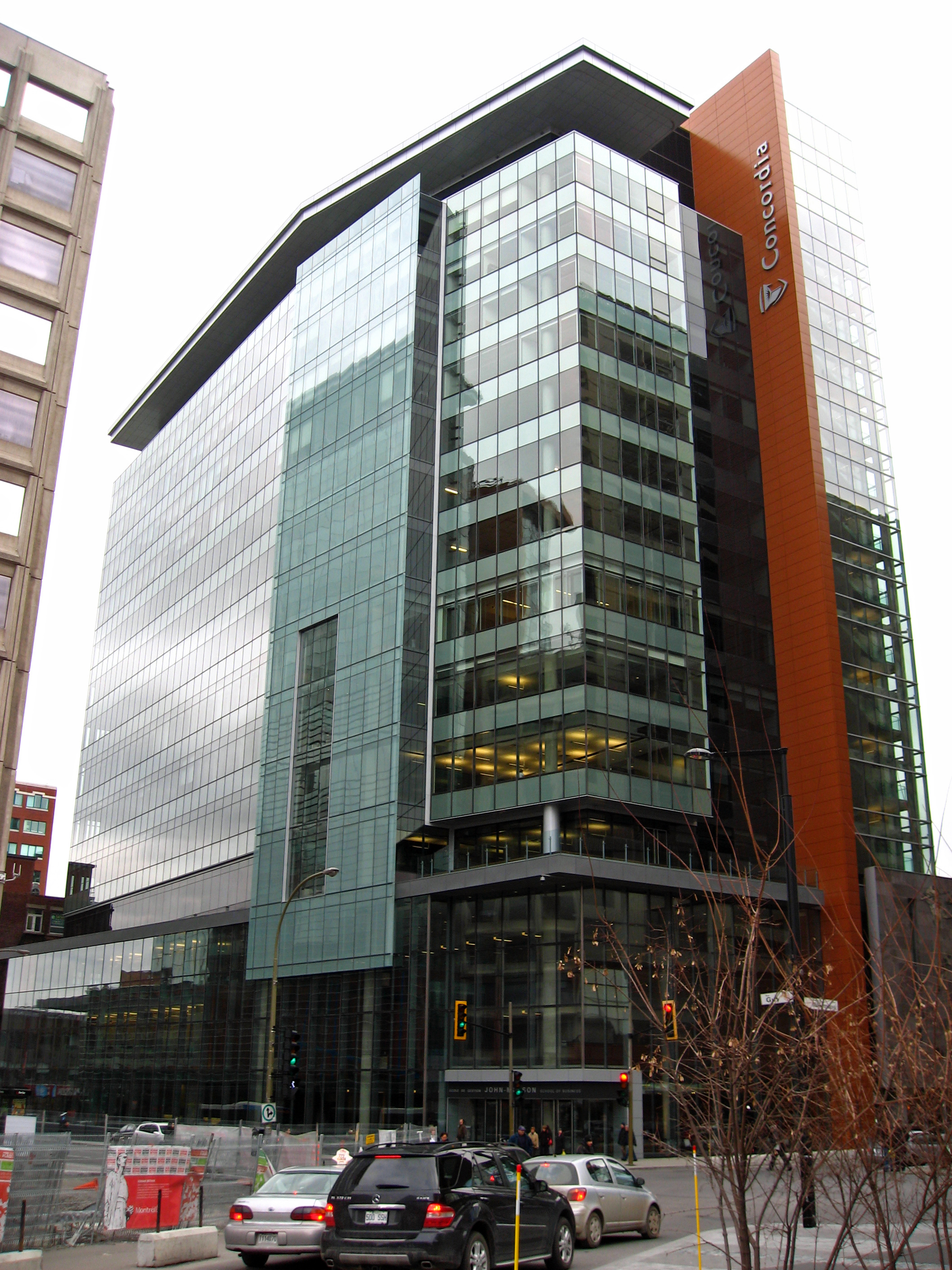
The John Molson School of Business at Concordia University is directly connected to Guy Metro.

=== Exits ===
- Guy Exit, 1445 Guy Street
- St-Mathieu Exit, 1801 de Maisonneuve Boulevard West

=== Connected via the underground city ===
- Concordia University Engineering and Visual Arts (EV) Building
- Concordia University Guy Metro Annex (GM) Building
- Concordia University John Molson School of Business (MB) Building
- Concordia University Henry F. Hall Building (H) (social sciences and humanities)
- Concordia University John Wilson McConnell Library Building(LB)

=== Other ===
- Concordia University, Sir George Williams Campus
- Quartier Concordia
- Canadian Centre for Architecture
- Éco-quartier Peter-McGill
- Faubourg Sainte-Catherine
- Collège de Montréal
- Golden Square Mile
- Montreal Museum of Fine Arts
- Norman Bethune Square
- Musée Marguerite d'Youville
- Montreal Masonic Memorial Temple
- Grand séminaire de Montréal
- Montreal General Hospital
- Cuban Consulate-General
- The Sacred Heart School of Montreal
- Trafalgar School for Girls
