= David Heilbroner =

American film director

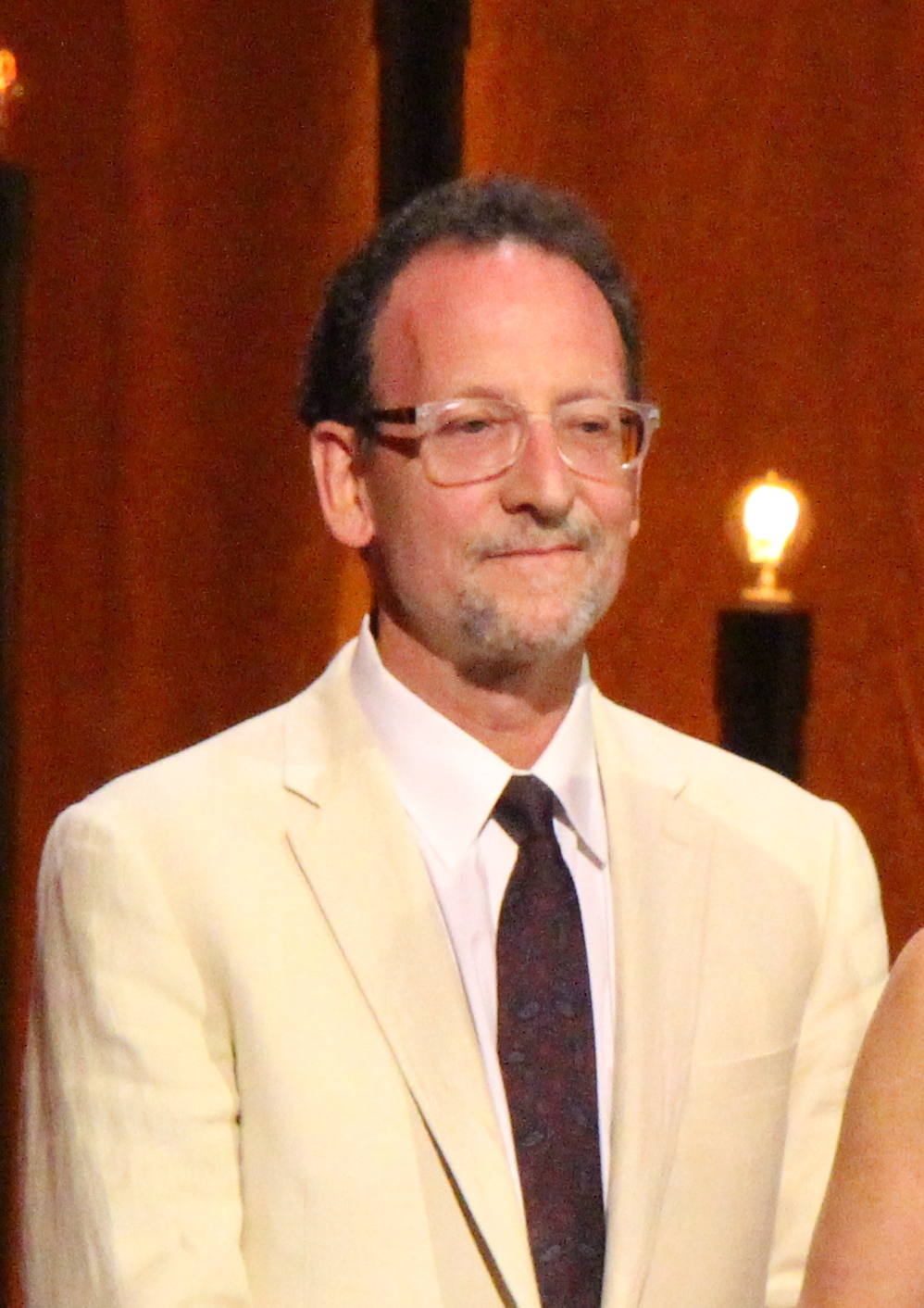
- Born: 20 August 1957 (age 69)
- Occupations: Director, producer, editor
- Years active: 1996–present
- Spouse: Kate Davis (married 1987–present)

David Heilbroner is an American director, producer and sound editor best known for producing Traffic Stop (2017), for which he received a nomination for Academy Award for Best Documentary Short Subject alongside his wife, Kate Davis, at the 90th Academy Awards.

== Filmography ==
- 2000: American Babylon (producer with Robert Stone)
- 2004: Jockey (producer)
- 2005: Pucker Up (with Kate Davis)
- 2006: 10 Days That Unexpectedly Changed America (episode: "Scopes: The Battle over America's Soul") (with Kate Davis)
- 2006: Plastic Disasters (TV movie) (with Kate Davis)
- 2009: Waiting for Armageddon (with Kate Davis and Franco Sacchi)
- 2010: Stonewall Uprising (with Kate Davis)
- 2011: American Experience (episode: "Stonewall Uprising") (with Kate Davis)
- 2013: The Cheshire Murders (TV movie) (with Kate Davis)
- 2014: The Newburgh Sting (with Kate Davis)
- 2017: Traffic Stop (short) (with Kate Davis)
- 2018: Say Her Name: The Life and Death of Sandra Bland (with Kate Davis)
- 2021: Dionne Warwick: Don't Make Me Over (with Dave Wooley)
- 2021: R.I.P. T-Shirts (short) (with Kate Davis)
- 2023: Martha's Vineyard v. DeSantis (with Kate Davis)
- 2024: A Tattoo on My Brain (TV movie) (with Kate Davis)
