= Kate Davis (director) =

American director, producer and editor

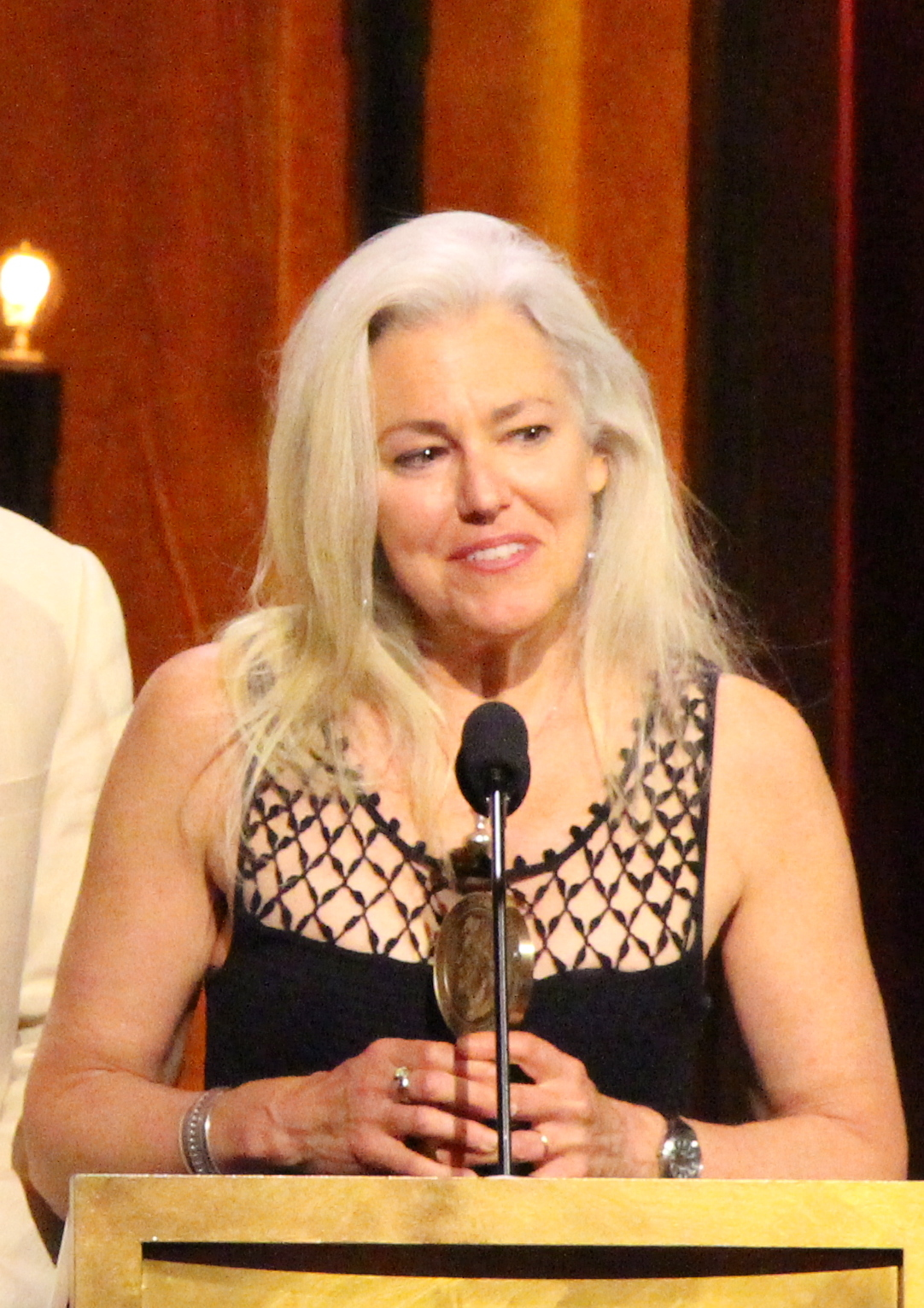
- Born: 23 February 1960 (age 66); Boston, Massachusetts, United States
- Occupations: Director, producer, editor
- Years active: 1983–present
- Spouse: David Heilbroner (married 1987–present)

Kate Davis is an American documentary director, producer and editor. She is best known for Southern Comfort (2001) and Traffic Stop (2017), the latter of which received a nomination for Academy Award for Best Documentary Short Film at the 90th Academy Awards. She and her husband, David Heilbroner, also directed Say Her Name, a documentary about the life and death of Sandra Bland.

== Filmography ==
- 1987: Girltalk
- 1990: A World Alive
- 2001: Southern Comfort
- 2004: Jockey
- 2005: Pucker Up (with David Heilbroner)
- 2006: 10 Days That Unexpectedly Changed America (episode: "Scopes: The Battle over America's Soul") (with David Heilbroner)
- 2006: Plastic Disasters (TV movie) (with David Heilbroner)
- 2007: The Addiction Project (episode: "The Adolescent Addict")
- 2009: Waiting for Armageddon (with David Heilbroner and Franco Sacchi)
- 2010: Stonewall Uprising (with David Heilbroner)
- 2011: American Experience (episode: "Stonewall Uprising") (with David Heilbroner)
- 2013: The Cheshire Murders (TV movie) (with David Heilbroner)
- 2014: The Newburgh Sting (with David Heilbroner)
- 2017: Traffic Stop (short) (with David Heilbroner)
- 2018: Say Her Name: The Life and Death of Sandra Bland (with David Heilbroner)
- 2023: Locked Out (with Luchina Fisher)
- 2023: Martha's Vineyard v. DeSantis (with David Heilbroner)
- 2024: A Tattoo on My Brain (TV movie) (with David Heilbroner)
