= Valery Fabrikant =

Belarusian-Canadian academic and mass shooter (1940–2026)

- Валерий Фабрикант (Russian); Валеры Фабрыкант (Belarusian)
- Fabrikant in 1992
- Born: 28 January 1940; Minsk, Byelorussian SSR, Soviet Union (now Belarus)
- Died: 27 June 2026 (aged 86); Sainte-Anne-des-Plaines, Quebec, Canada
- Occupation: Associate professor of mechanical engineering
- Motive: Extreme misplaced hostility
- Criminal charges: Murder and assault
- Penalty: Life sentence

Details
- Date: 24 August 1992; 2:30 p.m. (UTC-4)
- Locations: Montreal, Quebec, Canada
- Target: Ninth floor of the Henry F. Hall Building at Concordia University
- Killed: 4
- Injured: 1
- Weapons: Snub nosed Smith & Wesson .38-calibre 5-shot revolver; Meb pistol (6.35mm); Bersa pistol (7.65mm)

Valery Iosifovich Fabrikant (Russian: Валерий Иосифович Фабрикант, Belarusian: Валеры Іосіфавіч Фабрыкант, romanized: Valery Iosifavič Fabrykant, [vɐˈɫɛrɪj ˈjosifəvɪt͡ɕ fɐbrʲɪˈkant]; 28 January 1940 – 27 June 2026) was an associate professor of mechanical engineering at Concordia University in Montreal, Quebec, Canada. On 24 August 1992, after years of increasingly disruptive behaviour at the university, he shot and killed four colleagues and wounded one staff member.

His case stimulated much research and debate about gun control, and how universities should manage difficult employees. By 1994, the university had gathered over 200,000 signatures with the Coalition for Gun Control on a petition to ban the private ownership of handguns in Canada. After the Cowan Report criticized the university for being too "vague" and "slow" in dealing with Fabrikant, in 1995 they appointed an adviser to implement a "Code of Rights & Responsibilities", and later a "Code of Ethics", adopted in 1997, and created civil behaviour and conflict resolution initiatives like the Peace and Conflict Resolution Series in 2003.

Fabrikant was sentenced to life in prison and was denied parole or temporary leave in 2015 and again in 2022. After he filed numerous court proceedings of dubious legal merit, the Quebec Superior Court declared him a vexatious litigant, in 2000, which limited his ability to file legal actions.

== Background ==
Born in the Byelorussian SSR on 28 January 1940, Fabrikant emigrated to Canada in 1979. Although he claimed to be a political dissident, journalists from the Montreal Gazette later found that he had been dismissed from numerous positions in the USSR because of disruptive behaviour.

Fabrikant was hired at Concordia University in 1980, where he worked first as a research assistant with limited grant money. After several years he was promoted to academic positions included in departmental funding. He taught students and conducted independent research, despite students, staff and teaching faculty having reported behavioural problems ranging from "undesirable to intolerable".

Fabrikant attempted to collect information to blackmail officials into promoting him, threatened officials and colleagues, and blamed others for all of his problems. He blamed his peers for his being denied tenure and for seeking to have his employment terminated.

In 1982, a student filed a police report, claiming that he had raped her and dislocated her shoulder.

Over several months of escalating charges from late 1991 into 1992, he accused the university of tolerating the practice of academics being listed as co-authors on papers to which they had not contributed. In 1992, in the midst of an email campaign against numerous university officials, Fabrikant went to court to try to have the names of several colleagues removed from research papers he had written in the 1980s. That case was not concluded until November 2007, when Quebec Superior Court Judge Nicole Morneau dismissed it under a provision of the Quebec Code of Civil Procedure, designed to treat cases found to be frivolous or unfounded. It was later reopened, and eventually dismissed for good in March 2011.

== Shooting ==
By August 1992, Fabrikant faced a contempt of court charge due to his behaviour during his suit. In addition, he had been conducting an email campaign against numerous members of the university. He claimed fears of being killed in jail.

On 24 August 1992, Fabrikant took concealed weapons and ammunition with him to the engineering Department of the university, where he went on a shooting spree on the ninth floor of the Henry F. Hall Building. He killed Department Chair Phoivos Ziogas, and professors Matthew Douglass, Michael Hogben, and Jaan Saber. He wounded Elizabeth Horwood, a departmental staff secretary.

Phoivos Ziogas lived for a month in a coma before he died of massive internal injuries from the bullet ricocheting within his body.

== Trial and psychiatric assessment ==
Fabrikant represented himself at his five-month-long trial, after firing ten lawyers in the process. His claim was that the murders were done in "self-defence" because members of the faculty were "trying to give [him] a heart attack". During the trial, he compared himself to the abused orphans in the Mount Cashel Orphanage.

After several weeks of observing his eccentric behaviour, the judge suspended the proceedings to conduct a hearing into Fabrikant's mental fitness to stand trial. After a month's review, the two court-appointed psychiatrists found him fit to stand trial, although "severely paranoid and hostile". The judge ended Fabrikant's performances in the courtroom and sent the case to the jury. With the essential facts not in doubt, they found Fabrikant guilty of first-degree murder, and the court sentenced him to life imprisonment.

Despite two psychiatrists ruling in his favour, Fabrikant thought that he was insulted by them. According to Louis Morissette, Fabrikant asked to meet with him. Morissette worked at the Institut Philippe-Pinel de Montréal, an institution for the mentally disturbed, and specialized in legal psychiatry. Fabrikant spent several days there during his trial. Morissette spent several hours over a few days with Fabrikant. "Fabrikant wanted my help to counter-argue the two psychiatrists' opinion on him in court, and to help him argue that psychology has no scientific basis and proves nothing."

Morissette disagreed with the conclusions of the two psychiatrists appointed by the court. "Mr. Fabrikant suffers, in my opinion, from more than a simple personality disorder, […] he could be treated by pharmaceutical products, a treatment he always refused." "We often push the trial dates of people who suffer from complications because of heart attacks. In my opinion, Fabrikant is not fit to stand trial."

== Aftermath ==
Fabrikant served his sentence at Archambault Institution in Sainte-Anne-des-Plaines, Quebec.

Fabrikant was a Usenet user known for posting in newsgroups, particularly can.general and can.politics, as well as on his website. All contain trial transcripts and his version of events. He claimed to be the innocent victim of a conspiracy. From prison, he managed to circumvent restrictions on his communications to argue his case through a website and other media. He filed numerous legal proceedings with the court system until 2000, when the Quebec Superior Court declared him a vexatious litigant. The court dismissed his bid to clear that status in 2007.

In part because Fabrikant carried out his assault on a university campus, and societies have witnessed rising workplace violence, the case has been extensively studied. Later analysis concluded that "Fabrikant often displayed classic behavioural warning signs indicating potential violence". Within three years of the university's hiring him, Fabrikant had established a reputation of being "a difficult, argumentative and unpredictable individual – and one who seemed to set no limits on his own behaviour". The university failed to address his behaviour early on, and his harassment of students and colleagues increased over the years. The university attempted to change its guidelines for dealing with personnel. The case showed the problems of academic institutions, whose administrators were more used to assessing research, than in managing the behaviour of difficult staff.

Fabrikant kept on doing scientific research and published over 60 scientific papers from prison, triggering discussions on the ethicality of having allowed him to do so.

== Death ==
Fabrikant died in prison on 27 June 2026, at the age of 86.

== Works ==
- Applications of potential theory in mechanics: a selection of new results. Kluwer Academic Publishers. 1989.
- Mixed boundary value problems of potential theory and their applications in engineering. Kluwer Academic Publishers. 1991.
- Contact and crack problems in linear theory of elasticity. Bentham Science Publishers. 2010. ISBN 9781608051052.

A number of authors have praised his previous works.
