= American Experience season 20 =

American Experience
- Season 20
- No. of episodes: 14

Release
- Original network: PBS
- Original release: January 14 – May 6, 2008

Season chronology
- ← Previous; Season 19 Next → Season 21

Season twenty of the television program American Experience was originally shown on the PBS network in the United States on January 14, 2008, and concluded on May 6, 2008. The show celebrated its 20th anniversary. The season contained 14 new episodes and began with the film Oswald's Ghost. The last eight parts of the 14-part Eyes on the Prize miniseries were a rebroadcast of the production originally shown during 1990 on PBS. It was shown as a special presentation of American Experience during February in observance of Black History Month.

== Episodes ==
* Denotes multiple chapters that aired on the same date and share the same episode number

No. overall	No. in season	Title	Directed by	Categories	Original release date
234	1	"Oswald's Ghost"	Robert Stone	Biographies	January 14, 2008
235	2	"The Lobotomist"	Barak Goodman & John Maggio	Technology	January 21, 2008
The film follows Dr. Walter Freeman who championed the use of lobotomies on the mentally ill.
236	3*	"Eyes on the Prize (Parts 7–8)"	James A. DeVinney & Madison D. Lacy Jr. (Part 7); Sheila C. Bernard & Samuel D. Pollard (Part 8)	Civil Rights	February 3, 2008
Part 7: "The Time Has Come (1964–1966)" - Examines a lead member of the Nation of Islam - Malcolm X. The film also chronicles the political organizing work of the Lowndes County Freedom Organization (LCFO) in Alabama and the shooting of James Meredith during the March Against Fear.; Part 8: "Two Societies (1965–1968)" - Follows Martin Luther King Jr. during the Chicago Freedom Movement in Illinois and the tumultuous Detroit Riot of 1967 in Michigan.
237	4	"Grand Central"	Michael Epstein	Popular Culture, Technology	February 4, 2008
238	5*	"Eyes on the Prize (Parts 9–10)"	Louis Massiah & Terry Kay Rockefeller (Part 9); Jacqueline Shearer & Paul Stekler (Part 10)	Civil Rights	February 10, 2008
Part 9: "Power! (1966–1968)" - Chronicles the election of Carl Stokes as the mayor of Cleveland and the first African American to become mayor of a major U.S. city. The film also covers the formation of the Black Panther Party (BPP) and community control of the Ocean Hill-Brownsville school district in Brooklyn during the New York City teachers' strike of 1968.; Part 10: "The Promised Land (1967–1968)" - Chronicles the final years of Martin Luther King Jr. It also covers the Poor People's Campaign and Resurrection City in Washington, D.C.
239	6*	"Eyes on the Prize (Parts 11–12)"	Sheila C. Bernard & Samuel D. Pollard (Part 11); Louis Massiah, Thomas Ott & Terry Kay Rockefeller (Part 12)	Civil Rights	February 17, 2008
Part 11: "Ain't Gonna Shuffle No More (1964–1972)" - Chronicles the emergence of boxer Muhammad Ali, the student movement at Howard University, and the gathering of the National Black Political Convention in Gary, Indiana.; Part 12: "A Nation of Law? (1968–1971)" - Chronicles the leadership and murder of Fred Hampton of the Black Panther Party (BPP) in Chicago. The second segment of the film covers the Attica Prison rebellion in Attica, New York.
240	7	"Kit Carson"	Stephen Ives	Biographies, Native American History, The American West	February 18, 2008
241	8*	"Eyes on the Prize (Parts 13–14)"	Jacqueline Shearer & Paul Stekler (Part 13); James A. DeVinney & Madison D. Lacy (Part 14)	Civil Rights	February 24, 2008
Part 13: "The Keys to the Kingdom (1974–1980)" - Examines the Boston school desegregation crisis involving busing in Massachusetts. The second part of the film chronicles the election of Maynard Jackson as mayor of Atlanta and the first African American to become mayor of any major U.S. city in the southern United States. The last part of the film examines affirmative action and the landmark United States Supreme Court ruling Regents of the University of California v. Bakke (1978).; Part 14: "Back to the Movement (1979–mid 1980s)" - Covers the Miami riot of 1980 and the election of Harold Washington as the first African-American mayor of Chicago. The film finishes with an overview of the Civil Rights Movement and its effect upon the United States and the world.
242	9	"Buffalo Bill"	Rob Rapley	Biographies, Popular Culture, The American West	February 25, 2008
243	10	"Minik" "Minik, the Lost Eskimo"	Axel Engstfeld	Biographies	March 31, 2008
244	11	"Walt Whitman"	Mark Zwonitzer	Biographies, The Natural Environment	April 14, 2008
245	12	"Roberto Clemente"	Bernardo Ruiz	Biographies, Civil Rights, Popular Culture	April 21, 2008
246	13	"George H.W. Bush (Part 1)"	Austin Hoyt	Biographies, Politics, Presidents	May 5, 2008
Part 1: "CAVU"
247	14	"George H.W. Bush (Part 2)"	Austin Hoyt	Biographies, Politics, Presidents	May 6, 2008
Part 2: "Echoes of the Wise Men"
