= Claire Edun =

British actress

- Born: 1984 (age 41–42); Winchester, Hampshire, England
- Occupations: actress; comedianne
- Years active: 2015–present
- Spouse: Richard Edun (m. 2012; div. 2018)

Claire Edun, popularly known as Oyinbo Princess, is a British-born Nollywood actress best known for her fluency in Nigerian Pidgin; which eventually landed her a lead role in the film (ATM) Authentic Tentative Marriage, a 2016 feature film directed by Lancelot Imasuen.

== Life and career ==
Edun was born to British parents and had her education in the United Kingdom. Upon leaving Greece where she previously worked, she got a job as an air hostess for British Airways which eventually ignited her love for Africa and Nigeria in particular. She rose to the limelight in 2015 after she posted a video of herself on Facebook talking in fluent pidgin English which Lancelot Imasuen later saw and afterwards handed her a role in the film (ATM) Authentic Tentative Marriage, where she played the role of a British girl who came to Nigeria to marry a Nigerian man who wants to live in Britain.

== Filmography ==
- (ATM) Authentic Tentative Marriage (2016)
