= This Is Nollywood =

This is Nollywood
- DOP Bond Emeruwa and crew shoot a scene
- Directed by: Franco Sacchi
- Produced by: Cargo Film & Releasing
- Cinematography: Franco Sacchi Robert Caputo
- Edited by: Franco Sacchi
- Music by: Alan Perez Ted Corrigan Antibalas
- Release date: 2007
- Running time: 55 minutes
- Country: United States

This Is Nollywood is a 2007 Nigerian documentary film by Franco Sacchi and Robert Caputo, detailing the Nigerian film industry, much along the same lines as the acclaimed 2007 documentary Welcome to Nollywood by Jamie Meltzer

The documentary follows the production of Check Point, during which various members of the Nigerian filmmaking community discuss their industry, defend the types of films they make and the impact they have, and describe common difficulties they encounter, from hectic shooting schedules to losing electricity mid-shoot.

== Synopsis ==
This is Nollywood follows Nigerian director Bond Emeruwa filming feature-length action movie Check Point in nine days on the outskirts of Lagos.

== Awards ==
- Festival Internacional de Abuja 2007

== See also ==
- Welcome to Nollywood
- Nollywood Babylon
- List of Nigerian films of 2006
