= Archambault Institution =

Correctional facility in Quebec, Canada

Coordinates: 45.750°N 73.853°W

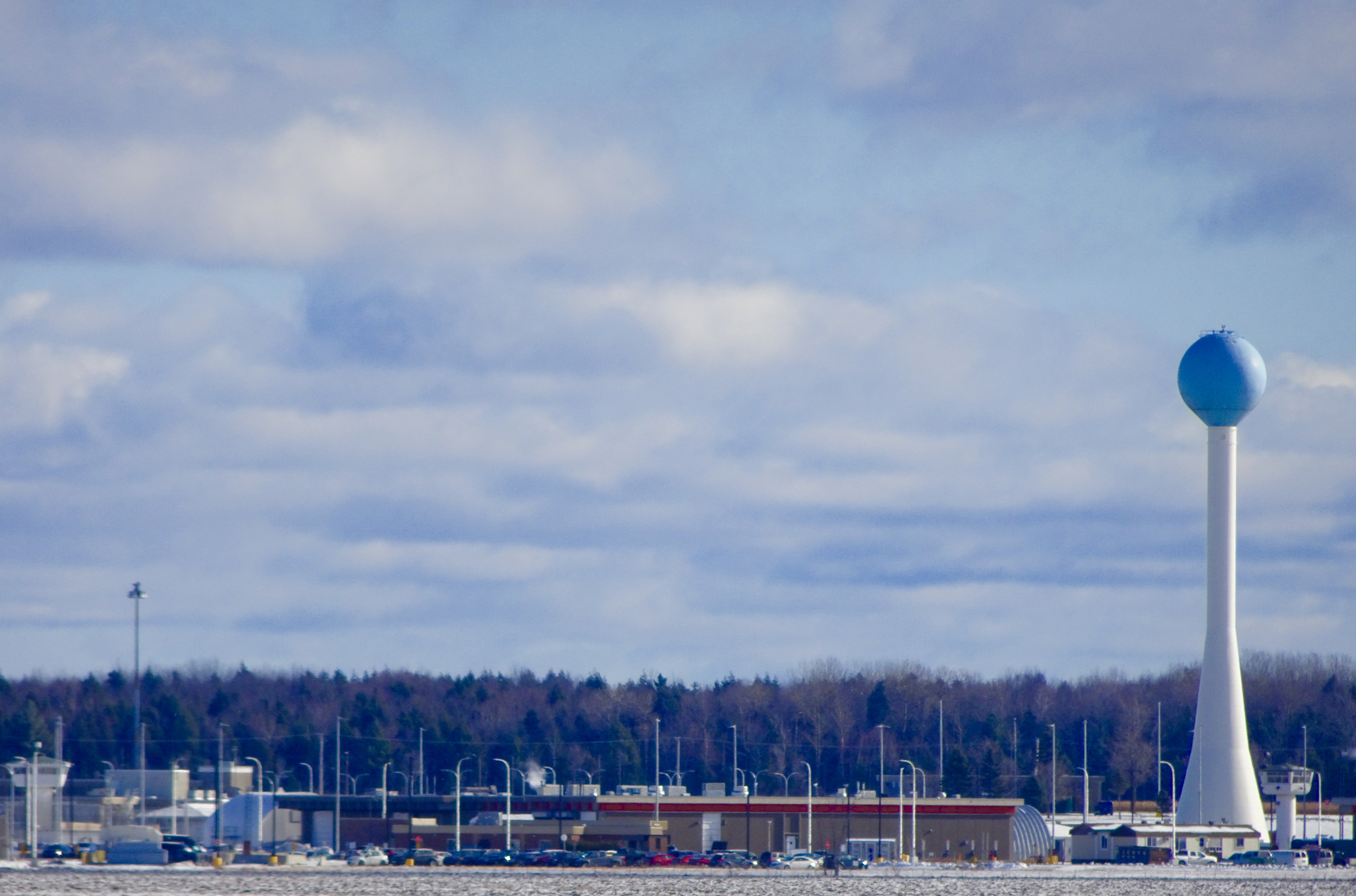

Archambault Institution (French: Établissement Archambault) is a prison of the Correctional Service of Canada in Sainte-Anne-des-Plaines, Quebec. Its minimum-security unit opened in 1968 and its medium security unit opened in 1969; the capacities respectively are 215 and 284.

It is colocated with the Regional Reception Centre, a maximum security prison.

== Notable prisoners ==
- Léopold Dion, serial killer
- Valery Fabrikant, perpetrator of the Concordia University massacre
- Luka Magnotta
- Jacques Mesrine
