= Samir Mallal =

Canadian filmmaker

Samir Mallal (born in Halifax, Nova Scotia) is a Canadian filmmaker whose work touches commercials, virtual reality, and documentaries. Samir is based in Los Angeles, California.

== Career ==
Samir's work appears on many platforms including advertising, virtual reality, and documentaries. The brands he has worked with in advertising include: Coca-Cola, Dell, Total, Google, GE, LG, Starbucks, Smirnoff, Tropicana, and Johnnie Walker.

In 2015 Samir directed the VR film New Wave with Aron Hjtartarson from Framestore. New Wave is captured in spherical live action video, and is the first VR film to feature dynamically changing, character specific voiceover. The film was featured in Creative Review's recent exploration of VR in its July 2015 issue.”

He has also made three documentaries: Discordia, Bombay Calling, and Nollywood Babylon. All three films were produced by Adam Symansky at the National Film Board of Canada.

His first film Discordia (2004) co-directed with fellow Concordia University graduate Ben Addelman follows three students during the aftermath of the Netanyahu riot at Concordia University in Montreal in 2002.

His second film, Bombay Calling (2006) also co-directed with Ben Addelman follows the lives of telemarketers working outsourced jobs in a call center in Bombay (Mumbai), India. It won the Grand Jury Prize at the Indian Film Festival of Los Angeles.

His film Nollywood Babylon (2008), co-directed with Ben Addelman tells the story of Lancelot 'Da Guvenor' Imasuen, as he prepares to make his 158th film in Lagos, Nigeria. The film premiered in the World Documentary Cinema Competition at the 2009 Sundance Film Festival.

== Awards ==
- Won with co-director Ben Addelman the Grand Jury Prize at the Indian Film Festival of Los Angeles for Bombay Calling.
- In 2009, he was nominated with co-director Ben Addelman for "Best World Cinema - Documentary" award during 2009 Sundance Film Festival for the film Nollywood Babylon.
- In 2010, he won Best Young Director and a Gold Lion at the Cannes Lions International Festival of Creativity.
- He was also selected for the Saatchi and Saatchi New Directors Showcase.
