= Gundega =

- Gender: Female
- Name day: 28 April

Origin
- Meaning: Buttercup
- Region of origin: Latvia

Gundega is a Latvian given name and may refer to:

- Gundega Cenne (1933–2009), Canadian artist
- Gundega Repše (born 1960), Latvian writer
- Gundega Sproģe (born 1972), Latvian triple jumper
