= Traffic Stop =

2017 documentary film by Kate Davis and David Heilbroner

- Film poster
- Directed by: Kate Davis; David Heilbroner
- Production company: Q-Ball Productions
- Distributed by: HBO Films
- Release date: November 14, 2017
- Running time: 30 minutes
- Country: United States
- Language: English

Traffic Stop is a 2017 American documentary film directed by Kate Davis and David Heilbroner.

== Summary ==
It chronicles a white police officer's stop and, ultimately, arrest of Breaion King, a 26-year-old African-American school teacher from Austin, Texas.

== Accolades ==
The film was nominated for the Academy Award for Best Documentary Short Subject at the 90th Academy Awards. After airing on HBO, it was nominated for an Emmy for Outstanding Short Documentary at the 40th News and Documentary Emmy Award. It received generally positive reviews from critics.
