= Earth Days =

- Theatrical release poster
- Directed by: Robert Stone
- Written by: Robert Stone
- Produced by: Robert Stone
- Cinematography: Howard Shack
- Edited by: Don Kleszy; Robert Stone
- Music by: Michael Giacchino
- Production companies: American Experience; Robert Stone Productions; WGBH
- Distributed by: Zeitgeist Films
- Release dates: April 2, 2009 (Wisconsin Film Festival); August 14, 2009 (United States)
- Running time: 102 minutes
- Country: United States
- Language: English
- Budget: $1.2 million
- Box office: $23,179

Earth Days is a 2009 documentary film about the history of the environmental movement in the United States, directed by Robert Stone and distributed by Zeitgeist Films in theaters. Earth Days premiered at the 2009 Wisconsin Film Festival, and released to theatres on August 14, 2009.

== Overview ==
Earth Days combines personal testimony and archival media. The film reviews the development of the modern environmental movement—from the post-war 1950s and the 1962 publication of Rachel Carson’s bestseller Silent Spring, to the successful Earth Day celebration in 1970. Featured pioneers of the era include the former United States Secretary of the Interior Stewart Udall; biologist Paul Ehrlich, author of The Population Bomb; Whole Earth Catalog founder Stewart Brand; Apollo 9 astronaut Rusty Schweickart; "The Forecaster" Dennis Meadows, scientist and Emeritus Professor of Systems Management; and "The Politician" Pete McCloskey, former Republican. Also included are Richard Nixon, former Governor of California Jerry Brown, Jimmy Carter, Denis Hayes, Jacques-Yves Cousteau, and Hunter Lovins.

== Release ==
The film premiered on April 2, 2009 at the Wisconsin Film Festival. It went on to have a limited theatrical release on August 14, 2009. It aired on US television on April 19, 2010 as part of the American Experience series on PBS.

=== Critical reception ===
On review aggregator website Rotten Tomatoes, the film holds an approval rating of 82% based on 33 reviews, and an average rating of 6.8/10. The website's critical consensus reads, "This engaging and well-organized eco-doc maps the successes and failures of the American environmental movement, thanks to sharp interviews and remarkable archive footage." On Metacritic, the film has a weighted average score of 70 out of 100, based on 13 critics, indicating "generally favorable" reviews.

=== Awards and nominations ===
- Closing night film, 2009 Sundance Film Festival
- The Sheffield Green Award, 2009 Sheffield Doc/Fest
- Nominated – Writers Guild of America Award for Best Documentary Screenplay, 62nd Writers Guild of America Awards.

== See also ==
- Environmentalism
- Radio Bikini (1988)
- Biophilia hypothesis
- Catching the Sun (2015)
