= Discordia (film) =

Feature documentary film

- Directed by: Ben Addelman; Samir Mallal
- Produced by: Adam Symansky
- Edited by: Hannele Halm; Ben Addelman
- Production company: National Film Board of Canada
- Release date: 2004
- Running time: 68 minutes
- Country: Canada
- Language: English

Discordia is a 2004 feature documentary film directed by Ben Addelman and Samir Mallal. Produced by the National Film Board of Canada, it chronicles life of three students — Aaron Maté, Noah Sarnah, and Samer Elatrash — during the aftermath of the Netanyahu Incident at Concordia University in Montreal in 2002.

== See also ==
- Confrontation at Concordia
