= Bombay Calling =

- Bombay Calling promotional poster
- Directed by: Ben Addelman, Samir Mallal
- Written by: Ben Addelman, Samir Mallal
- Produced by: Adam Symansky
- Cinematography: Ben Addelman; Samir Mallal
- Edited by: Hannele Halm
- Music by: Ramachandra Borcar, LCD Soundsystem, Bombay Rockers, DJ Aqueel
- Distributed by: National Film Board of Canada
- Release date: August 22, 2006 (Limited)
- Running time: 72 mins.
- Language: English

Bombay Calling is a 2006 feature documentary film directed by Ben Addelman and Samir Mallal. Produced by the National Film Board of Canada which follows the journey of Kaz Lalani, the pioneer of Call Centre Outsourcing. Bombay Calling chronicles the lives of young call center workers in Bombay (presently Mumbai) India.

== Synopsis ==
Bombay Calling delves into the lives of a group of young Indians working outsourced jobs at a call center in Bombay. Without focusing too much on the politics, it profiles several characters as they train for and attempt to sell phone services to clients in the UK. The film shows both sides of the impact of globalization on India - the economic benefits, but also the break with tradition and loss of innocence the characters face. By the end of the film, the telemarketing venture has failed but the characters are resilient. For this reason, the film has been compared to Startup.com.

== Awards ==
It won the Grand Jury Prize at the Indian Film Festival of Los Angeles, and Most Innovative Documentary at the Doxa Film and Video Festival. The Film has played at festivals such as Hot Docs, Melbourne and Bergen and received a theatrical release in Canada during the summer of 2006.

== Release ==
On August 22, it was released on DVD in Canada by Mongrel Media. National Geographic International has been broadcasting the film on cable television around the world, and it was shown in India on August 15, to critical acclaim.

== Reviews ==
"An eye-opening look at the strangeness of an emerging and already conflicted middle-class."
LA Weekly

"4 stars...a vibrant, insightful look at young people employed in India's bustling call-centre industry....like an East Asian companion piece to Startup.com."
Eye Toronto

"Analogous to nothing so much as Mamet's Glengarry Glen Ross, so vividly does it encapsulate the mug's game of sales."
Toronto Sun

"Captures the Sense of the cool world inhabited by telemarketers."
Vancouver Sun

== See also ==
- Nalini by Day, Nancy by Night
