= Plastic People (film) =

2024 Canadian documentary film

Plastic People: The Hidden Crisis of Microplastics
- Directed by: Ben Addelman; Ziya Tong
- Written by: Ben Addelman
- Produced by: Stephen Paniccia; Vanessa Dylyn
- Narrated by: Ziya Tong
- Cinematography: Roger Singh
- Edited by: Ania Smolenskaia
- Production company: White Pine Pictures
- Release date: March 9, 2024 (SXSW)
- Running time: 84 minutes
- Country: Canada
- Language: English

Plastic People: The Hidden Crisis of Microplastics is a 2024 Canadian documentary film directed by Ben Addelman and Ziya Tong, which examines microplastics and their impact on the human body.

== Release ==
The film premiered at the 2024 South by Southwest Film & TV Festival, and had its Canadian premiere at the DOXA Documentary Film Festival.

It was later broadcast by CBC Television in March 2025 as an episode of The Nature of Things.

== Critical response ==
Nick Holdsworth of Modern Times Review wrote that "Plastic People does not say it, but capitalism and the unfettered greed of corporations are the real villains here. And the only real answer to tackling plastic pollution is the same answer to so many 21st ills – to redesign the system so that we run our lives to support and fulfil people, not a handful of vulgar billionaires."

For Variety, Owen Gleiberman wrote that "one of the great values of a documentary like “Plastic People” is that it takes an issue you think you’ve grasped and colors it in. It takes your scattershot information and fuses it into a fuller vision — of the past, and the future."

== Awards ==
Award	Year	Category	Title	Result	Ref
Canadian Screen Awards	2025	Rob Stewart Award	Peter Raymont, Stephen Paniccia, Vanessa Dylyn, Rick Smith, Steve Ord	Nominated	
Canadian Screen Awards	2025	Best Direction in a Documentary Program	Ben Addelman, Ziya Tong	Won	
Canadian Screen Awards	2025	Best Editing in a Documentary Program or Series	Ania Smolenskaia	Nominated	
