= Dionne Warwick: Don't Make Me Over =

- Directed by: Dave Wooley; David Heilbroner
- Produced by: Dave Wooley; Associate Producers; Veda Wooley; Davina Wooley
- Starring: Dionne Warwick
- Cinematography: Tom Bergmann; Thaddeus Wadleigh
- Edited by: Stephen Perry
- Production companies: Mister Smith Entertainment; Artemis Rising Foundation
- Distributed by: CNN Films
- Release date: September 11, 2021 (TIFF)
- Running time: 95 minutes
- Country: United States
- Language: English

Dionne Warwick: Don't Make Me Over is an American documentary film directed by Dave Wooley and David Heilbroner. It follows the life and career of Dionne Warwick.

On January 1, 2023, It premiered on CNN.

== Synopsis ==
The film follows the life and career of Dionne Warwick. Quincy Jones, Burt Bacharach, Bill Clinton, Clive Davis, Gladys Knight, Cissy Houston, Elton John, Damon Elliott, Kenneth Cole, Berry Gordy, Alicia Keys, Jerry Blavat, Snoop Dogg and Smokey Robinson appear in the film.

== Release ==
The film had its world premiere at the 2021 Toronto International Film Festival in September 2021. It screened at the Montclair Film Festival on October 23, 2021. In February 2022, CNN+ acquired distribution rights to the film. The streaming service, however, ended shortly after launch and Dionne announced on her Twitter account that the documentary will have an on-air cable broadcast premiere date of August 28, 2022, exclusively on CNN. The film premiered on January 1, 2023, debuting at #1 among cable news viewers aged 25–54. After the broadcast, it was made available on HBO Max.

== Awards ==
At TIFF, the film was first runner-up for the People's Choice Award for Documentaries. The film also won the Best Feature honor at the Gene Siskel Film Center’s Black Harvest Film Festival, as well as receiving Centerpiece Screening at DOC NYC and landing the Audience Award at the 2021 Montclair Film Festival.
