= The Letter (2003 film) =

The Letter: An American Town and the "Somali Invasion"
- Directed by: Ziad Hamzeh
- Written by: Ziad H. Hamzeh
- Produced by: Ziad H. Hamzeh; Bert Brown; Paul F. Harron, Jr. Marc Sandler
- Starring: Citizens of Lewiston, Maine
- Edited by: Ziad H. Hamzeh; Franco Sacchi
- Distributed by: Arab Film Dist.
- Release dates: November 13, 2003 (AFI); January 15, 2005
- Running time: 76 minutes
- Country: United States
- Languages: English; Somali

The Letter: An American Town and the 'Somali Invasion' is a 2003 documentary directed by Ziad Hamzeh. It was filmed in the town of Lewiston, Maine.

== Synopsis ==
In October 2002, former mayor of Lewiston Laurier T. Raymond wrote an open letter addressed to leaders of the Somali immigrant community, predicting a negative impact on the city's social services and requesting that they discourage further relocation to the town. The letter angered some people and prompted various community leaders and residents to speak out against the mayor, drawing national attention.

Demonstrations were held in Lewiston, both by those who supported the immigrants' presence and those who opposed it. In January 2003, a small white supremacist group demonstrated in the city in support of the mayor, prompting a simultaneous counter-demonstration of about 4,000 people at Bates College and the organization of the "Many and One Coalition".

== Reception ==
The film premiered at the 2003 American Film Institute film festival and was chosen as The Amnesty 2004 festival opener. It received very positive reviews including an endorsement and high recommendation from the Southern Poverty Law Center. The film garnered numerous awards and accolades including the Independent Spirit Award from Boston. It continues to be shown across the globe especially nowadays when issues of immigration and refugee resettlement are once again ignited by the various wars around the world.

== See also ==
- History of Somalis in Maine
