= American Experience season 21 =

American Experience
- Season 21
- No. of episodes: 9

Release
- Original network: PBS
- Original release: January 26 – May 11, 2009

Season chronology
- ← Previous; Season 20 Next → Season 22

Season twenty-one of the television program American Experience originally aired on the PBS network in the United States on January 26, 2009 and concluded on May 11, 2009. The season contained nine new episodes and began with the film The Trials of J. Robert Oppenheimer.

== Episodes ==
No. overall	No. in season	Title	Directed by	Categories	Original release date
248	1	"The Trials of J. Robert Oppenheimer"	David Grubin	Biographies, Technology, War	January 26, 2009
The film focuses on the 1954 security hearing of J. Robert Oppenheimer, called a "father of the atomic bomb" for his role in the Manhattan Project. He was held before the United States Atomic Energy Commission (AEC) for being a suspected Communist.
249	2	"The Polio Crusade"	Sarah Colt	Popular Culture, Technology	February 2, 2009
Examines the impact of the infectious disease polio and the campaign to conquer it beginning with the nonprofit organization March of Dimes in the 1930s and culminating in the creation of a vaccine by Dr. Jonas Salk in the 1950s. The film is in part based on the book, Polio: An American Story, by David Oshinsky.
250	3	"The Assassination of Abraham Lincoln"	Barak Goodman	Presidents	February 9, 2009
The film chronicles the life of assassin John Wilkes Booth and his assassination of President Abraham Lincoln, the third president to die while in office. Lincoln was shot once in the back of his head while watching a play at Ford's Theatre in Washington, D.C. on April 14, 1865.
251	4	"A Class Apart"	Peter Miller & Carlos Sandoval	Civil Rights, Popular Culture	February 23, 2009
The film chronicles a small-town Texas murder and its development into a landmark civil rights case in which Mexican American lawyers take Hernandez v. Texas to the Supreme Court, challenging Jim Crow–style discrimination.
252	5	"We Shall Remain (Part 1)"	Chris Eyre	Civil Rights, Native American History, Politics, The American West	April 13, 2009
Part 1: "After the Mayflower" - In 1621, Wampanoag leader Massasoit negotiates to provide help to the ailing Pilgrims from the Mayflower, on the brink of disaster, because he thinks this alliance will ensure protection for his tribe from the threatening Narragansett tribe. For the next fifty years, it will become more and more clear that Massasoit was wrong as continuing European immigration, widespread diseases and overuse of natural resources push the interaction between the Wampanoag and the Pilgrims to war led by Metacomet, Massoit's son.
253	6	"We Shall Remain (Part 2)"	Ric Burns & Chris Eyre	Civil Rights, Native American History, Politics, The American West	April 20, 2009
Part 2: "Tecumseh's Vision" - In 1805, plains Indians in the Midwest were feeling the threat of westward expansion by white pioneers. Tecumseh, a member of the Shawnee tribe, used the growing worry of disparate tribes to bring them together into a confederacy with the common goal of saving their ancestral land. The dream of a separate Indian nation state would die along with Tecumseh when he was killed in the Battle of the Thames in 1813.
254	7	"We Shall Remain (Part 3)"	Chris Eyre	Civil Rights, Native American History, Politics, The American West	April 27, 2009
Part 3: "Trail of Tears" - For many years, the Cherokee nation sought to gain respect from the United States Government by adapting Western-style religion, government and education in the hopes of receiving recognition of their ancestral land as a sovereign nation. On May 26, 1838, the United States Government had troops forcibly remove members of the Cherokee tribe from their land in the Southeastern US to Oklahoma. More than 4,000 people would die of disease and starvation along the way of the Trail of Tears.
255	8	"We Shall Remain (Part 4)"	Sarah Colt and Dustinn Craig	Civil Rights, Native American History, Politics, The American West	May 4, 2009
Part 4: "Geronimo" - Apache Geronimo and his fierce band of warriors refused to accept the expansion of the United States and Mexico into his tribe's land. Geronimo and his band of warriors earned the distinction of being one of the last major forces of Native American resistance before their eventual surrender in 1886. This resistance earned Geronimo the distinction of being the most famous Native American of his time.
256	9	"We Shall Remain (Part 5)"	Stanley Nelson	Civil Rights, Native American History, Politics, The American West	May 11, 2009
Part 5: "Wounded Knee" - The American Indian Movement's last stand at Wounded Knee in 1973 brought attention to the desperate conditions of Indian reservation life. Around 200 American Indians engaged in a 71-day standoff with the US government demanding redress for grievances, some dating back over 100 years.
