= Nollywood Babylon =

- Director Bond Emeruwa and crew shoot a scene
- Directed by: Ben Addelman; Samir Mallal
- Written by: Ben Addelman; Samir Mallal
- Screenplay by: Ben Addelman; Samir Mallal
- Produced by: National Film Board of Canada
- Starring: Lancelot Oduwa Imasuen; Osita Iheme; Helen Ukpabio; Uche Jumbo; Omotola
- Release date: 2008
- Running time: 75'
- Country: Canada

Nollywood Babylon is a 2008 feature documentary film directed by Ben Addelman and Samir Mallal. Produced by the National Film Board of Canada, it is about the explosive popularity of Nigerian movies. The United Kingdom distributor is Dogwoof Pictures. The film received a positive response from critics.

== See also ==
- Welcome to Nollywood
- This Is Nollywood
