= Henry F. Hall =

Canadian academic administrator (1897–1971)

Henry Foss Hall, SM (28 June 1897 – 1971) was a Canadian academic administrator. He was Dean, then Principal of Sir George Williams University from 1935 to 1962.

One of the inaugural recipients of the Order of Canada, he received the Medal of Service of the Order of Canada in 1967.

The Henry F. Hall Building at Concordia University in Montreal is named in his honour. A scholarship is named in his honour.
