= Lancelot Oduwa Imasuen =

Nigerian film producer

- Born: 20 June 1971 (age 55); Benin City, Nigeria
- Citizenship: Nigerian
- Occupations: director, producer
- Years active: 1995–present
- Spouse: Aimua Lancelot Imasuen

Lancelot Oduwa Imasuen (born 20 June 1971) is a Nigerian film director and film producer. Popularly known as De' Guvnor of Nollywood. He is an Edo-born filmmaker who has produced over five hundred films and counting. He is well known for his 2014 epic historical film, Invasion 1897.

== Education and career ==
He studied at the University of Port Harcourt. Imasuen has worked in the film industry since 1995, mainly as a film director and producer. He currently lives in Lagos.

His films feature unexplored aspects of the African experience including tribalism, witchcraft, crime, poverty, religion, and folk beliefs.

Imasuen has filmed an epic movie titled Nogbaisi Ovonramwen in 2013. The film was about Oba Ovonramwen, the last independent Oba of Benin. In 2025, he celebrated his thirty years in the industry. He launched his memoir A Trip in Motion, on November 27, 2025, at Alliance Française/Mike Adenuga Centre, Ikoyi, Lagos, with dignitaries in attendance.

== Nollywood Babylon ==
In 2008, a Canadian documentary, Nollywood Babylon, co-directed by Ben Addelman and Samir Mallal, and produced by AM Pictures and the National Film Board of Canada in association with the Documentary Channel, followed Lancelot Oduwa Imasuen while he was shooting his 157th film Bent Arrows.

The documentary played in the Official Competition at the Sundance Film Festival in January 2009. Bent Arrows was released into the Nigerian home market in 2010.

== Selected filmography ==
- The Soul That Sinneth (1999)
- The Last Burial (2000)
- Issakaba (2001)
- Private Sin (2003)
- Enslaved (2004)
- Moment of Truth (2005)
- Games Men Play (2006)
- Yahoo Millionaire (2007)
- Sister's Love (2008)
- Entanglement (2009)
- Reloaded (2009)
- Home in Exile (2010)
- Bent Arrows (2010)
- A Private Storm (2010)
- Adesuwa (2012)
- Invasion 1897 (2014)
- ABCs of Death 2 (Segment L is for Legacy) (2014)
- "ATM (Authentic Tentative Marriage)" (2016)
- Love Upon the Hills (2018)
- Rant Queens (2019)
- Enakhe (2020)
- Mutual Benefits (2021)
- For the Love of Isiuwa (2021)
- Gbege (2022)
- Love Under Repair (2023)
- Senior Man (2023)
- Issakaba Returns (2024)

== Awards and nominations ==
Year	Award ceremony	Category	Film	Result	Ref
2017	Best of Nollywood Awards	Lifetime Achievement Award	—N/a	Won	
2020	2020 Best of Nollywood Awards	Director of the Year	WEDE	Nominated	
2021	Honorary Academic Chair	Benson Idahosa University		Honorary	
2025	2025 African Celebrate	Diamond Recognition Award		Honorary	
2025	African Movie Academy Award	Pillar of African Stories		Honorary	
2025	Abuja International Film Festival	Industry Special Recognition Award		Honorary	

== See also ==
- List of Nigerian film producers
