= Veda Davida Wooley =

American attorney (born 1997)

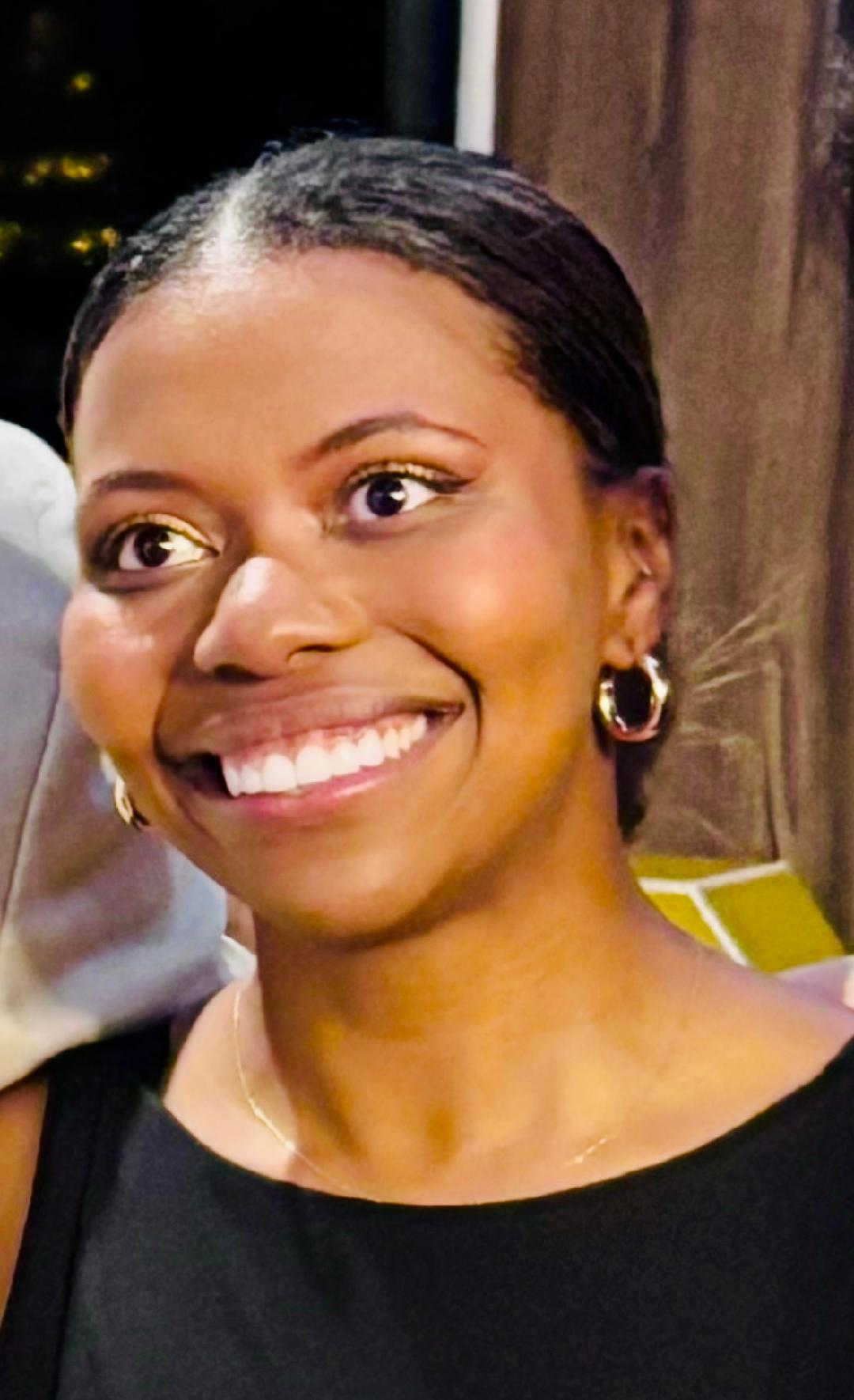
- Veda in Wilmington, Delaware June 2025
- Born: January 25, 1997 (age 29); Hockessin, Delaware, U.S.
- Other name: Veda Wooley
- Education: Wilmington University Education: Wilmington University BS & MBA Finance; Thomas R. Kline School of Law Drexel University Juris Doctor
- Years active: 2020
- Children: 1

Veda Davida Wooley (born January 25, 1997) is an American attorney who currently serves as a Deputy Attorney General at the Delaware Department of Justice.

== Early life and education ==
Wooley was born in Hockessin, Delaware. She and her sister were raised in Newark, Delaware by their father Dave Wooley (an NAACP Image Award nominated film producer, and director). Wooley's spent her middle and high schools years at Cab Calloway School of Arts in Wilmington, Delaware. In 2017, Wooley earned a Bachelor of Science degree, in Finance, and a Master of Business Administration in Finance in 2018 from Wilmington University. In 2020, Wooley earned a Juris Doctor from Thomas R. Kline School of Law (Drexel University). She passed the Nevada Bar Exam, Delaware Bar Exam and the Uniform Bar Exam in Pennsylvania.

On October 10, 2025, the Pennsylvania Board of Law Examiners announced that Wooley successfully passed the Uniformed Bar Exam on her first attempt. Wooley scored in the top 10% of all test-takers. This qualifies her to practice law in forty states.

== Career ==
Wooley serves a Deputy attorney General at the Delaware Department of Justice. In addition, she is an adjunct instructor at Wilmington University. In 2023, Wooley along with her sister Davina, served as Associate Producers on the award-winning documentary, "Dionne Warwick: Don't Make Me Over", a film that was produced and directed by her father.

From 2020 through 2023, Wooley served as Deputy Human Resources and Contracts Counsel at the Legislative Counsel Bureau in the state of Nevada.

Wooley is the President of Wooley Entertainment.

== Personal life ==
Wooley has a son and they resides in Wilmington, Delaware. She is the goddaughter of singer Dionne Warwick.
