= Seymour Pine =

New York City Police Inspector (1919–2010)

Seymour Pine (July 21, 1919 – September 2, 2010) was an American deputy police inspector with the New York City Police Department (NYPD) who served on the force from 1941 to 1976. As deputy inspector, he led the police raid on the Stonewall Inn, which took place in the early morning hours of June 28, 1969. The resulting Stonewall riots helped spark the development of the nascent gay rights movement in the United States.

== Biography ==
Pine was born on July 21, 1919, in Manhattan and grew up in Kew Gardens, Queens. He attended Brooklyn College, where he graduated in 1941. He joined the NYPD after graduating from college, but shortly thereafter enlisted to serve in the United States Army, where he saw duty in North Africa and in Europe. After completing his military service, Pine returned to the force and was elevated to the rank of deputy inspector in the late 1960s.

Pine died at age 91, on September 2, 2010, at an assisted-living facility in Whippany, New Jersey. He was survived by two sons and seven grandchildren. His wife, the former Judith Handler, had died in 1987.

== Stonewall ==
The NYPD regularly raided such clubs, seeking to combat prostitution and organized crime activities, and Pine said at the time that three other bars in Greenwich Village had been raided in the two weeks before the Stonewall Inn raid. In such raids at gay bars, transvestites would routinely be arrested and it was common for officers to harass other customers. When the June 28 raid was initiated by his superiors, Deputy Inspector Pine was commander of the vice squad and he was leading a group of eight officers. The Stonewall Inn was Mafia-owned and there were 200 people inside when the raid began shortly after midnight with plainclothes officers presenting a search warrant citing the claim that liquor was being sold illegally at the bar. Despite orders for all patrons to line up and provide identification, several customers refused and a number of transvestites refused to undergo "anatomical inspections".

As word of the raid spread, hundreds of protesters gathered outside the Stonewall. After the police tried to place a woman in a police car the crowd confronted the officers who went back into the club to avoid the increasingly defiant crowd. After some in the crowd tried to set the club on fire, pulled a parking meter out of the sidewalk and tried to use it to smash down the door, and threw objects such as bottles, garbage cans and coins at the officers, additional reinforcements were called, taking more than an hour to restore order and disperse the crowd that had gathered around the Stonewall Inn. That night, four police officers were injured and there were 13 arrests made, in addition to several cases of liquor that had been seized as the Inn lacked a liquor license. Rioting continued for several nights, with crowds growing into the thousands. In his 2004 book Stonewall: The Riots That Sparked the Gay Revolution, David Carter described the Stonewall riots as being "to the gay movement what the fall of the Bastille is to the unleashing of the French Revolution."

Pine retired from the New York City Police department in 1976. In the following years, Carter rebutted the notion that Pine was a homophobe, saying that "I think he was strictly following orders, not personal prejudice against gay people". At a 2004 program conducted at the New-York Historical Society, Pine acknowledged that officers "certainly were prejudiced... but had no idea about what gay people were about." He also justified the raid on the Stonewall as a routine way of combating organized crime and noted that arresting gay people was an easy way for officers to improve their arrest numbers since, at least until that night, "They never gave you any trouble." He later told Carter that "If what I did helped gay people, then I'm glad". As cited in The Advocate in 2009, Pine said that "I don’t think not liking gay people had anything to do with it" and asked on the Brian Lehrer Show about the justification for the raid responded that "When we took the action that we took that night, we were on the side of right. We never would have done something without supervision from the federal authorities and the state authorities."

Interviews with Pine and other eyewitness accounts of the incident at the Stonewall Inn were included in the 2010 documentary film Stonewall Uprising produced and directed by Kate Davis and David Heilbroner. "You knew they broke the law, but what kind of law was it?", he claims in the documentary.
