= American Experience season 18 =

American Experience
- Season 18
- No. of episodes: 13

Release
- Original network: PBS
- Original release: October 17, 2005 – May 22, 2006

Season chronology
- ← Previous; Season 17 Next → Season 19

Season eighteen of the television program American Experience originally aired on the PBS network in the United States on October 17, 2005 and concluded on May 22, 2006. The season contained 13 new episodes and began with the film Two Days in October.

== Episodes ==
No. overall	No. in season	Title	Directed by	Categories	Original release date
206	1	"Two Days in October"	Robert Kenner	Politics, War	October 17, 2005
The film chronicles the Vietnam War protests and Dow riots at the University of Wisconsin and the Battle of Ong Thanh in 1967. The film is in part based on the book, They Marched Into Sunlight, by David Maraniss.
207	2	"Race to the Moon"	Kevin Michael Kertscher	Technology	October 31, 2005
208	3	"Las Vegas: An Unconventional History (Part 1)"	Stephen Ives	Popular Culture, The American West	November 14, 2005
209	4	"Las Vegas: An Unconventional History (Part 2)"	Stephen Ives	Popular Culture, The American West	November 15, 2005
210	5	"John & Abigail Adams"	Peter Jones	Biographies, Politics, Presidents	January 23, 2006
211	6	"The Nuremberg Trials"	Michael Kloft	Politics, War	January 30, 2006
212	7	"Jesse James"	Mark Zwonitzer	Biographies, Popular Culture	February 6, 2006
213	8	"Hijacked"	Ilan Ziv	Politics	February 27, 2006
The film recounts the 1970 Dawson's Field hijackings and subsequent destruction of four commercial airliners.
214	9	"Eugene O'Neill"	Ric Burns	Biographies, Popular Culture	March 27, 2006
215	10	"The Boy in the Bubble"	Barak Goodman & John Maggio	Biographies, Technology	April 10, 2006
216	11	"The Alaska Pipeline"	Mark Davis	Technology, The Natural Environment	April 24, 2006
217	12	"Annie Oakley"	Riva Freifeld	Biographies, Popular Culture, The American West	May 8, 2006
218	13	"The Man Behind Hitler"	Lutz Hachmeister	Biographies, War	May 22, 2006
