= Dave Wooley =

American director, producer, author and entrepreneur

David Freeman Wooley
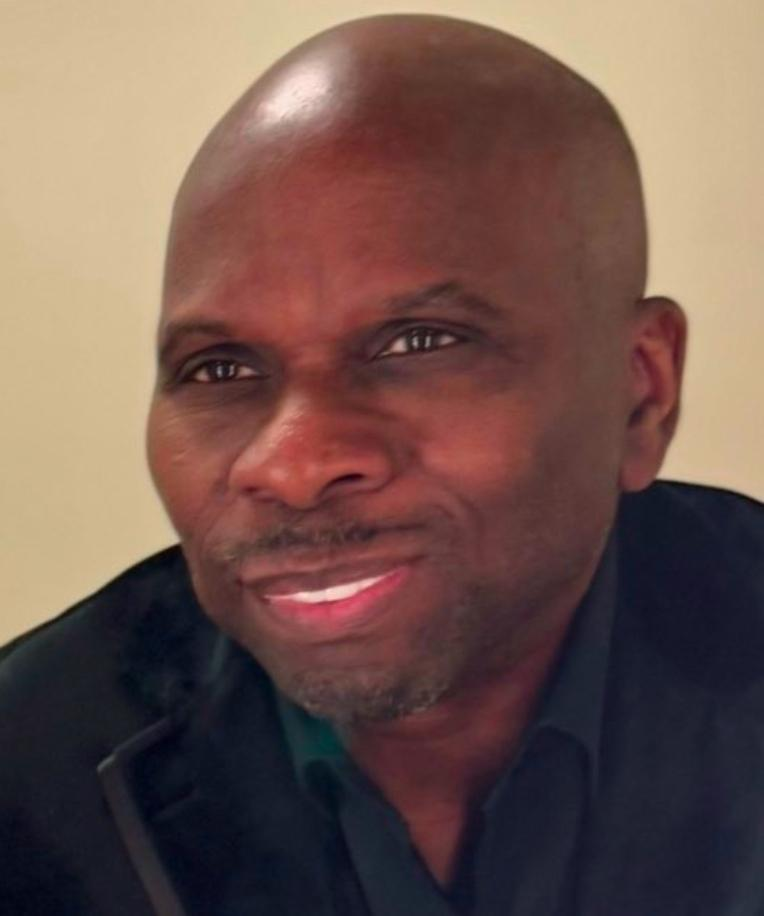
- Dave Wooley in 2024
- Born: April 9, 1960 (age 66); Harlem, New York, U.S.
- Other name: Dave Wooley
- Education: Wilmington University Education: Wilmington University BBA & MBA
- Occupations: Director; producer; author; entrepreneur
- Years active: 1981–present
- Notable work: CNN Documentary; Dionne Warwick: Don't Make Me Over; The Clash of the Legends: Julius "Dr. J" Erving vs Kareem Abdul-Jabbar; Talent/Content Advisor: Biden/Harris Presidential Inaugural Committee
- Spouse: Debora Wooley (m. 2023)
- Children: 2 Veda Davida Wooley; Davina E'man Wooley

David Freeman Wooley (born April 9, 1960) is an American director, producer, author and entrepreneur based in Wilmington, Delaware. His most notable accomplishments include long-standing work with Dionne Warwick, and collaborations with Julius "Dr. J" Erving.

The NAACP Image Awards announced on January 25, 2024, that Wooley is nominated in the category for Outstanding Directing in a documentary television or film, for his documentary, Dionne Warwick: Don't Make Me Over.

== Early life ==
Wooley was born and raised in Harlem, New York to parents Herman and Bettye Wooley. The family lived in the Frederick Douglass housing projects in Manhattan Valley, Manhattan. Wooley was six years old when he began taking drum lessons from Nigerian musician, Babatunde Olatunji. During his elementary years, Wooley attended Holy Name Catholic School and graduated from the all-boys private Rice High School in Harlem, New York. In 1980, Wooley re-located to Wilmington, Delaware attending, Wilmington University where he received a BBA and MBA.

== Career ==
Wooley launched his career in the entertainment industry as a teenage drummer, recording with professionals including gospel singer Cissy Houston, and R&B/Jazz artist Norman Connors. In 1981, Wooley founded his production company, Dave Wooley Productions. Later, he also spent seven years as president and co-owner of DJ Group, a sports entertainment company, along with Julius "Dr J" Erving. As a producer, Wooley has worked with Stevie Wonder, James Brown, Run-DMC, Loretta Lynn, and Tony Bennett.

=== Collaboration ===
Wooley's most extensive collaborations are with Dionne Warwick, his business partner whom he has worked with for over 25 years. He co-written three books with her tilted, "Say A Little Prayer", "Little Man" and her autobiography, My Life, As I See It—and produced her 50th anniversary gala at Lincoln Center. He also wrote, produced, and co-directed the documentary Dionne Warwick: Don't Make Me Over. This movie follows the life and career of Warwick. The film received a standing ovation at the Toronto International Film Festival and won first runner-up for the People's Choice Award for Documentaries, later also winning the Best Feature honor at the Gene Siskel Film Center's Black Harvest Film Festival, receiving Centerpiece Screening at DOC NYC, and landing the Audience Award at the 2021 Montclair Film Festival. In a positive review of the documentary, Victor Stiff of That Shelf wrote, "[Co-director David Heilbroner] and Wooley pack their film with everything you want from a musical documentary: fantastic music, a one-of-a-kind star, and deep-cut stories from family and friends. It's an inspiring tale of overcoming the odds, filled with beautiful music and prudent life lessons along the way." The film also features, Stevie Wonder, Elton John, Quincy Jones, Burt Bacharach, Carlos Santana, Berry Gordy, Bill Clinton, Gladys Knight, Clive Davis, Barry Gibb, Gloria Estefan, Smokey Robinson, Cissy Houston, Alicia Keys, and Snoop Dogg. The documentary premiered on CNN on January 1, 2023, debuting at #1 among cable news viewers aged 25–54. As of July 2023, the documentary has a Rotten Tomatoes critic's rating of 91% and audience rating of 100%. After the broadcast, it was made available on HBO Max.

On April 26, 2024, Wooley gave a speech, and introduced Warwick prior to her getting inducted into The National Rhythm and Blues Music Society's Atlantic City Walk of Fame.

=== Other projects ===
Wooley's career has extended into the sports sector. In 1988 he rose to prominence as the only Black man in the country to be awarded exclusive paid-per-view and closed-circuit television broadcasting rights for several entire states to the Mike Tyson versus Michael Spinks "Once And For All" match – the largest fight in history at the time. The fight grossed over seventy million dollars. He was subsequently featured in the 2021 documentary series Mike Tyson: The Knockout. Wooley was also awarded exclusive paid-per-view and closed-circuit television broadcast rights for several states to other championship fights including, the 1991 match-up, George Foreman vs Evander Holyfield.

In 1993, Wooley had a vision to develop an area of Wilmington Delaware Christina Riverfront into a family style entertainment destination by building a movie theatre and restaurants then called, Riverview Plaza. Later that year, It became a close reality when, Enterprise Developers Corporation led by Wooley which included, Julius "Dr.J" Erving, and investment banker, Malcolm D. Pryor Sr., won Wilmington City Council's request for proposal (RFP), during Mayor, James H. Sills, Jr's administration.

Wooley was the sole producer who came up with the idea for "The Clash of the Legends," a paid-per view TV hoopfest of 1992, which pitted retired NBA basketball players Julius "Dr. J" Erving and Kareem Abdul-Jabbar against one another. Wooley described the event as a spiritual descendent of the one-on-one games played between neighborhood legends in his native Harlem. Proceeds from the event went to benefit the American Foundation for AIDS Research, as well as the Magic Johnson Foundation, a charity established by the retired Laker star to battle against the HIV virus.

In 2024, Wooley served as Vice Chair for amFar (American Foundation for Aids Research), which held their fundraising gala in Palm Beach, Florida. The non-profit organization honored award-winning singer Dionne Warwick for her work as a trailblazer in HIV/Aids activism. Barry Gibb of the Bee Gees presented the award to Warwick. Recording artist Sting was the featured performer. The event raised 4.1 million dollars.

In May 2024, Wooley co-produced the, "Don't Make Me Over" Europe Tour, which included performances in London, Scotland, Ireland, and Dublin. As part of the performance, Wooley interviewed Dionne Warwick on stage as she recalled stories and events from her life. This was supported by footage from Warwick's, "Dionne Warwick: Don't Make Me Over" documentary film.

== Awards and recognition ==
In 2009, Wooley's children's book Say a Little Prayer—co-authored with Warwick and Tonya Bolden, and illustrated by Soud—was nominated for the NAACP Image Award for Outstanding Literary Work, Children's.

In October 2015, then-Wilmington Mayor Dennis Williams formally honored Wooley with a key to the city for his work promoting Wilmington, in particular the creation of the Clifford Brown Jazz Festival.

In 2020, Wooley was named Talent/Content Advisor for the Biden/Harris Presidential Inaugural Committee.

In 2022, the city of Wilmington performed a street naming ceremony in Wooley's honor, designating the corner of 16th and Claymont Street "David F. Wooley Way."

In 2023, Wooley was featured on the cover of HBCU Times.

On December 8, 2023, Wooley received an honorary doctoral degree from Huron University in recognition of his body of work.

The NAACP Image Awards announced on January 25, 2024, that Wooley is nominated in the category for Outstanding Directing in a documentary television or film, for his documentary, Dionne Warwick: Don't Make Me Over.

== Personal life ==
Wooley grew up in Harlem, New York, before relocating to Wilmington in 1980. He raised two daughters from the ages of two, and three years old until adulthood as a single custodial father. Veda Davida Wooley a practicing attorney, and Davina a computer engineer, who received an MS in Computer Science from Georgia Tech. He has been an adjunct professor at Wilmington University's College of Business since 1996, where he teaches business and marketing classes.
