= Sir George Williams University =

Former public university in Quebec, Canada

- Former name: Sir George Williams College
- Type: Public
- Active: 1926–1974
- Affiliations: YMCA
- Location: Montreal, Quebec, Canada; 45.497°N 73.579°W
- Nickname: Georgians

Sir George Williams University was a university in Montreal, Quebec, Canada. It merged with Loyola College to create Concordia University on August 24, 1974.

== History ==
In 1851, the first YMCA in North America was established on Sainte-Hélène Street in Old Montreal. Beginning in 1873, the YMCA offered evening classes to allow working people in the English-speaking community to pursue their education while working during the day. Sixty years later, the Montreal YMCA relocated to its current location on Stanley Street in Downtown Montreal.

In 1926, the education program at the YMCA was re-organized as Sir George Williams College, named after George Williams, founder of the original YMCA in London, upon which the Montreal YMCA was based. In 1934, Sir George Williams College offered the first undergraduate credit course in adult education in Canada.

Sir George Williams College received its university charter from the provincial government in 1948, though it remained the education arm of the Montreal YMCA. Sir George Williams expanded into its first standalone building, the Norris Building, in 1956. In 1959, the college requested that the Quebec legislature amend its university charter, changing its name to Sir George Williams University. It established a Centre for Human Relations and Community Studies in 1963. Sir George Williams continued to hold classes in the YMCA building until the construction of the Henry F. Hall Building in 1966.

Following several years of discussions and planning, Sir George Williams University merged with Loyola College to create Concordia University in 1974. Concordia provided students with representative student organizations and greater power over administrative decisions at the university.

=== Sir George Williams Computer Centre Incident ===
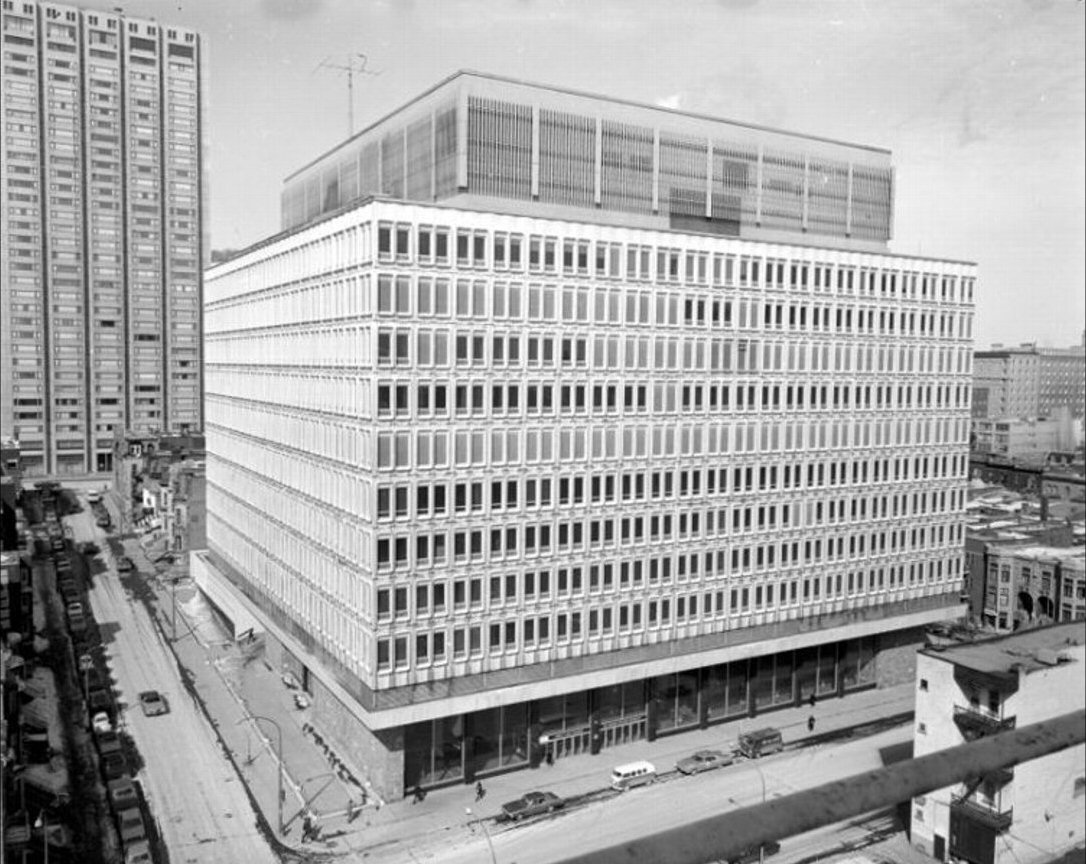
The Henry F. Hall Building in 1970

The university gained international attention in 1969, when a group of Black students occupied the Henry F. Hall Building's ninth-floor computer lab to protest alleged racism by the university. This protest was documented in the 2015 documentary film Ninth Floor by director Mina Shum, and the 2025 documentary film True North by Michèle Stephenson.

== Sir George Williams Georgians ==
The Sir George Williams Georgians were the Canadian Interuniversity Athletics Union teams that represented Sir George Williams University.

Shortly after Sir George Williams merged with Loyola College to create Concordia University in 1974, the Georgians and the Loyola Warriors were replaced by the Concordia Stingers.

== Principals ==
Principals of Sir George Williams College and University
Name	Term start	Term end
Anson W. Young	1925	1928
Frederick O. Stredder	1928	1935
Kenneth E. Norris	1936	1956
Henry F. Hall	1956	1962
Robert C. Rae	1962	1968
Douglass B. Clarke, Acting Principal	1968	1969
John W. O'Brien	1969	August 23, 1974

== Alumni ==
- Bob Berry (born 1943), NHL player
- Gundega Cenne (1933–2009), artist
- John Alton Collins (1917–2007), political cartoonist
- Robert Dean (1927–2021), Canadian politician
- Rosie Douglas (1941–2000), Prime Minister of Dominica
- Stuart McLean (1948–2017), author, storyteller, Canadian radio broadcaster
- E. Annie Proulx (born 1935), novelist, short story writer, journalist
- Nachum Eliezer Rabinovitch (1928–2020), rabbi and author
- Mordecai Richler (1931–2001), author
- Bernie Wolfe (born 1951), NHL player
