= Solidarity for Palestinian Human Rights =

Canadian pro-Palestine student advocacy group

Solidarity for Palestinian Human Rights (SPHR) is a non-profit, student-based organization based in Montreal, Quebec, Canada. It is involved in organizing protests against the Israeli occupation of Palestine.

== History ==
SPHR was established in 1999 as a result of a merger between two student organizations based at Concordia University and McGill University in Montreal; the Concordia Centre for Palestinian Human Rights (CCPHR) and the McGill Palestinian Solidarity Committee (PSC). The SPHR gained a wider profile after organizing a protest in Concordia University, that forced the Israeli ex-Prime Minister Benjamin Netanyahu to cancel a speech that was to take place on 9 September 2002. Rama Al-Malah serves as its spokesperson. In 2009, the organization publicly threatened civil disobedience and unrest in response to the Canada Border Services agency barring then British MP George Galloway from entry into Canada.

The groups have sponsored anti-Israel rallies on many campuses, especially since the Hamas attack on Israel on October 7, 2023. McGill University criticized its branch of the SPHR for encouraging celebration of the attack. It responded by saying that its social media posts were "looking at the prospect of liberation" rather than celebrating violence.

In June 2024, the group announced on Instagram that it will be hosting a "revolutionary youth summer program" at McGill University's lower field that includes "physical activity, Arabic language instruction, cultural crafts, political discussions, historical and revolutionary lessons". The post, featuring gunmen wearing keffiyeh, drew criticism from Centre for Israel and Jewish Affairs and B'nai Brith Canada, and was called "extremely alarming" by the university president Deep Saini.

== See also ==
- Israel-Palestine conflict
- Students for Justice in Palestine
