= American Experience season 22 =

American Experience
- Season 22
- No. of episodes: 8

Release
- Original network: PBS
- Original release: November 2, 2009 – May 10, 2010

Season chronology
- ← Previous; Season 21 Next → Season 23

Season twenty-two of the television program American Experience originally aired on the PBS network in the United States on November 2, 2009, and concluded on May 10, 2010. The season had eight new episodes and began with the film The Civilian Conservation Corps.

== Episodes ==
No. overall	No. in season	Title	Directed by	Categories	Original release date
257	1	"The Civilian Conservation Corps"	Robert Stone	The American West, The Natural Environment	November 2, 2009
258	2	"Wyatt Earp"	Rob Rapley	Biographies, The American West	January 25, 2010
259	3	"The Bombing of Germany"	Zvi Dor-Ner	Politics, War	February 8, 2010
260	4	"Dolley Madison"	Muffie Meyer	Biographies, Politics, Presidents	March 1, 2010
261	5	"Earth Days"	Robert Stone	Popular Culture, The Natural Environment	April 19, 2010
262	6	"My Lai"	Barak Goodman	War	April 26, 2010
263	7	"Roads to Memphis"	Stephen Ives	Civil Rights	May 3, 2010
264	8	"Into the Deep: America, Whaling & the World"	Ric Burns	The Natural Environment	May 10, 2010
