= American Experience season 19 =

American Experience
- Season 19
- No. of episodes: 15

Release
- Original network: PBS
- Original release: October 2, 2006 – May 14, 2007

Season chronology
- ← Previous; Season 18 Next → Season 20

Season 19 of the television program American Experience originally aired on the PBS network in the United States on October 2, 2006 and concluded on May 14, 2007. The season contained 15 new episodes and began with the first two parts of the Eyes on the Prize miniseries, "Awakenings (1954–1956)" and "Fighting Back (1957–1962)". The first six parts of the 14-part miniseries were a rebroadcast of the production originally shown during 1987 on PBS. The Mormons film was co-produced with the PBS documentary program Frontline.

== Episodes ==
* Denotes multiple chapters that aired on the same date and share the same episode number

No. overall	No. in season	Title	Directed by	Categories	Original release date
219	1*	"Eyes on the Prize (Parts 1–2)"	Judith Vecchione (Parts 1–2)	Civil Rights	October 2, 2006
Part 1: "Awakenings (1954–1956)" - Chronicles the murder of Emmett Till in Mississippi and the Montgomery bus boycott in Alabama.; Part 2: "Fighting Back (1957–1962)" - Chronicles the school desegregation efforts at Central High School by the Little Rock Nine in Arkansas and by James Meredith at the University of Mississippi during the Ole Miss riot of 1962.
220	2*	"Eyes on the Prize (Parts 3–4)"	Orlando Bagwell (Part 3); Callie Crossley & James A. DeVinney (Part 4)	Civil Rights	October 9, 2006
Part 3: "Ain't Scared of Your Jails (1960–1961)" - Covers the Nashville sit-ins and boycotts that sought to end racial segregation at lunch counters in Tennessee and the Freedom Riders efforts to end segregation on interstate transportation and terminals throughout the southern United States.; Part 4: "No Easy Walk (1961–1963)" - Examines the failed attempt by the Southern Christian Leadership Conference (SCLC) in Albany, Georgia to end segregation and the subsequent lessons learned to win a major victory in Birmingham, Alabama during the Birmingham campaign. The film also covers the March on Washington, one of the largest political rallies for civil rights in the United States.
221	3*	"Eyes on the Prize (Parts 5–6)"	Orlando Bagwell (Part 5); Callie Crossley & James A. DeVinney (Part 6)	Civil Rights	October 16, 2006
Part 5: "Mississippi: Is This America? (1962–1964)" - Chronicles the murder of Medgar Evers in 1963 and the murders of Chaney, Goodman, and Schwerner in 1964 in Mississippi. The film also covers the Mississippi Freedom Democratic Party (MFDP) attendance at the Democratic National Convention in Atlantic City during the United States presidential election of 1964.; Part 6: "Bridge to Freedom (1965)" - Examines efforts to restore voting rights in Selma, Alabama during the Selma to Montgomery marches.
222	4	"Test Tube Babies"	Chana Gazit & Hilary Klotz Steinman	Technology	October 23, 2006
223	5	"The Great Fever"	Adriana Bosch & Michael Chin	Technology	October 30, 2006
The film examines the work of Walter Reed in his efforts to discover the transmitter of the viral disease yellow fever.
224	6	"The Gold Rush"	Randall MacLowry	The American West	November 6, 2006
225	7	"The Berlin Airlift"	Peter Adler, Alexander Berkel & Stefan Mausbach	War	January 29, 2007
226	8	"The Living Weapon"	John Rubin	Technology, War	February 5, 2007
The film chronicles the development of the biological weapons program in the United States.
227	9	"New Orleans"	Stephen Ives	Popular Culture	February 12, 2007
228	10	"Sister Aimee"	Linda Garmon	Biographies, Popular Culture	April 2, 2007
229	11	"Jonestown: The Life and Death of Peoples Temple"	Stanley Nelson	Popular Culture	April 9, 2007
230	12	"Summer of Love"	Gail Dolgin & Vicente Franco	Popular Culture	April 23, 2007
The film recounts the history of the hippie movement in Haight-Ashbury district within San Francisco during the summer of 1967.
231	13	"The Mormons (Part 1)"	Helen Whitney	Biographies, Popular Culture, The American West	April 30, 2007
Part 1: "History"
232	14	"The Mormons (Part 2)"	Helen Whitney	Biographies, Popular Culture, The American West	May 1, 2007
Part 2: "Church & State"
233	15	"Alexander Hamilton"	Muffie Meyer	Biographies, Politics, Presidents	May 14, 2007
