= Stonewall Uprising =

2010 American documentary film by Kate Davis and David Heilbroner

- Theatrical release poster
- Directed by: Kate Davis; David Heilbroner
- Written by: David Heilbroner
- Produced by: Kate Davis; David Heilbroner; Mark Samels
- Cinematography: Buddy Squires; Kate Davis
- Edited by: Kate Davis
- Music by: Gary Lionelli
- Distributed by: First Run Features
- Release date: June 16, 2010
- Running time: 82 minutes
- Country: United States
- Language: English

Stonewall Uprising is a 2010 American documentary film examining the events surrounding the Stonewall riots that began during the early hours of June 28, 1969. Stonewall Uprising made its theatrical debut on June 16, 2010, at the Film Forum in New York City. The film features interviews with 15 participants and eyewitnesses to the riots, including many who were active in the uprising and later went on to form gay liberation groups, as well as law enforcement who participated in the raids that precipitated the rebellion.

The film was produced and directed by the documentary makers Kate Davis and David Heilbroner, and is based on the book by the historian David Carter, Stonewall: The Riots That Sparked the Gay Revolution. The title theme is by Gary Lionelli.

== Overview ==
Stonewall Uprising begins with a general overview of societal attitudes toward homosexuality in 1960s America. Archival footage from locally produced television programs, public service films warning of the "dangers" of homosexuality, an episode of CBS Reports titled "The Homosexuals", and interviews with Stonewall participants and observers Virginia Apuzzo, Martin Boyce, Raymond Castro, Danny Garvin, Jerry Hoose, Tommy Lanigan-Schmidt, Dick Leitsch, John O'Brien, New York Police Department deputy inspector Seymour Pine, Yvonne Ritter, Fred Sargeant, Martha Shelley, Howard Smith, Lucian Truscott, and Doric Wilson present both a national perspective and a personal one. The film also touches on pre-Stonewall activism, including the Annual Reminder pickets held in Philadelphia.

The film then shifts to the days immediately preceding the riot and the specific conditions in New York City, including a raid on the Stonewall Inn that had happened days before the raid that triggered the riot, to explain why conditions were ripe for some action to happen. Archive film from the riots, dramatic re-enactments and eyewitness testimony are presented, along with animation of the streets surrounding the Stonewall Inn showing how rioters were able to evade and outflank responding police.

It concludes with an examination of the aftermath of the rioting, including the energizing of the gay community as a political force and the establishment of Christopher Street Liberation Day, the genesis of gay pride parades in the United States.

== Reception ==
In 2011, Stonewall Uprising received a Peabody Award.

David Mixner, the author, political strategist, civil rights activist and public affairs advisor, wrote on his blog,

Like the movie Milk, this film can have a major impact on the LGBT movement. We need to get people into the theaters and see this amazing historical document... ...With much surprise, I learned so much new information from this film about the evening (of Stonewall)...Another surprise to me was the broad spectrum of citizens who participated in the riots that extended far beyond the young and drag queens.

== American Experience ==
Stonewall Uprising was shown on PBS's American Experience series on April 25, 2011, as season 23's episode 10.

The film was released on DVD on April 26, 2011, and the unedited interviews were made accessible in the American Archive of Public Broadcasting in 2018.
