= American Experience season 23 =

American Experience
- Season 23
- No. of episodes: 12

Release
- Original network: PBS
- Original release: October 11, 2010 – May 16, 2011

Season chronology
- ← Previous; Season 22 Next → Season 24

Season 23 of the television program American Experience originally aired on the PBS network in the United States on October 11, 2010 and concluded on May 16, 2011. The season contained 12 new episodes and began with the first two parts of the God in America miniseries, "A New Adam" and "A New Eden". The God in America film was also co-produced with the PBS documentary program Frontline.

== Episodes ==
* Denotes multiple chapters that aired on the same date and share the same episode number

No. overall	No. in season	Title	Directed by	Categories	Original release date
265	1*	"God in America (Parts 1–2)"	David Belton	Popular Culture	October 11, 2010
Part 1: "A New Adam"; Part 2: "A New Eden"
266	2*	"God in America (Parts 3–4)"	Sarah Colt	Popular Culture	October 12, 2010
Part 3: "A Nation Reborn"; Part 4: "A New Light"
267	3*	"God in America (Parts 5–6)"	Greg Barker	Popular Culture	October 13, 2010
Part 5: "Soul of a Nation"; Part 6: "Of God and Caesar"
268	4	"Robert E. Lee"	Mark Zwonitzer	Biographies, War	January 3, 2011
269	5	"Dinosaur Wars"	Mark Davis	The American West, The Natural Environment	January 17, 2011
270	6	"Panama Canal"	Stephen Ives	Popular Culture, Technology, The Natural Environment	January 24, 2011
271	7	"The Greely Expedition"	Rob Rapley	Popular Culture, The Natural Environment	January 31, 2011
272	8	"Triangle Fire"	Jamila Wignot	Popular Culture, Technology	February 28, 2011
273	9	"The Great Famine"	Austin Hoyt & Aisiyuak Yumagulov	Popular Culture, The Natural Environment	April 11, 2011
274	10	"Stonewall Uprising"	Kate Davis & David Heilbroner	Civil Rights, Popular Culture	April 25, 2011
275	11	"Soundtrack for a Revolution"	Bill Guttentag & Dan Sturman	Civil Rights, Popular Culture	May 9, 2011
276	12	"Freedom Riders"	Stanley Nelson	Civil Rights, Popular Culture	May 16, 2011
