= Aaron Maté =

Canadian journalist (born 1979)

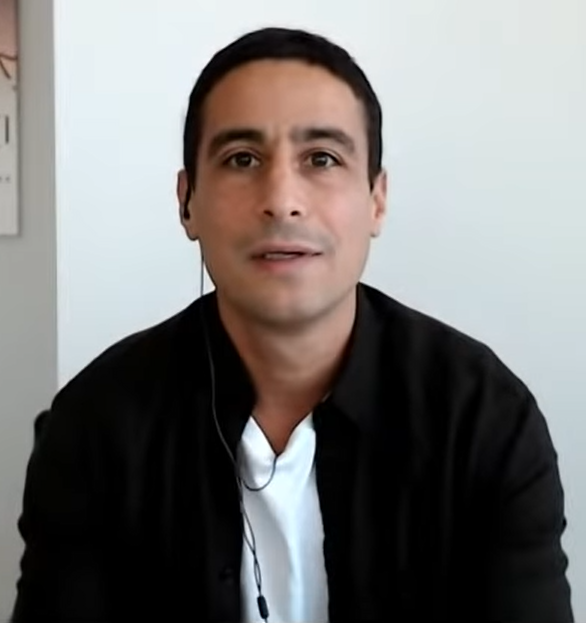
- Maté in 2021
- Born: 13 March 1979 (age 47); Vancouver, British Columbia, Canada
- Education: Concordia University (BA)
- Occupation: Journalist
- Parents: Gabor Maté (father); Rae Maté (mother)
- Writing career
- Years active: 2005–present
- Genre: Political commentary
- Subjects: U.S. politics; Russian interference in the 2016 United States elections; Douma chemical attack
- Notable awards: Izzy Award (2019)

Aaron Maté (/ˈmɑːteɪ/ MAH-tay; born 13 March 1979) is a Canadian writer and journalist. He hosts the show Pushback with Aaron Maté on The Grayzone and, as of January 2022, he fills in as a host on the Useful Idiots podcast. Maté has worked as a reporter and producer for Democracy Now!, Vice, The Real News Network, and Al Jazeera, and has contributed to The Nation.

Maté currently works as a reporter for The Grayzone, a fringe far-left news website and blog.

He challenged allegations of collusion between the Russian government and the 2016 Trump presidential campaign, and the extent to which Russian interference influenced the outcome of the 2016 US presidential election.

Maté has testified at United Nations Arria meetings hosted by Russia and China, after being invited by the Permanent Mission of the Russian Federation to the United Nations, including one meeting concerning what Maté called a cover-up by the Organisation for the Prohibition of Chemical Weapons regarding the April 2018 Douma chemical attack.

== Early life ==
Maté was born into a Jewish family in Vancouver to Rae Maté, a visual artist and an illustrator of children's books, and Gabor Maté, a Hungarian-born Canadian physician, author, and columnist.

While a student, Maté was vice president of the pro-Palestinian student union at Concordia University in Montreal and he was the main subject of the National Film Board of Canada documentary Discordia. The film depicts Maté's campus activism in support of the Palestinian cause and the effect it has on his relationship with the student union and his Palestinian friends. He received death threats from fellow Jews due to his condemnation of Israel's treatment of Palestinians. Maté was arrested during the Concordia University Netanyahu riot on 9 September 2002, after stepping between protesters and police, for which he faced expulsion.

From 2003 to 2005 Maté worked as a primary researcher for Naomi Klein, who praised him as "a great intellect and terrific journalist".

== Journalism ==
Maté has worked at Democracy Now!, Vice Media, Al Jazeera English, The Real News Network, The Nation, and The Grayzone.

=== Scepticism about Russian election interference claims ===
Using the term "Russiagate", Maté covered the story around Russian interference in the 2016 United States elections and criticized the mainstream media coverage of the Special Counsel investigation.

In October 2017, Maté discussed the media coverage of the investigation in The Nation, stating that "unverified claims are reported with little to no scepticism ... developments are cherry-picked and overhyped, while countervailing ones are minimised or ignored. Front-page headlines advertise explosive and incriminating developments, only to often be undermined by the article's content, or retracted entirely." Maté contended that use of social media by Russia had no effect on the election: "To suggest 200 [Twitter] accounts out of 328 million could have had an impact is as much an insult to common sense as it is to basic math." And: "A $100,000 Facebook ad purchase seems unlikely to have had much impact in a $6.8 billion election."

In a July 2018 article in The Nation, following the 2018 Russia–United States Summit in Helsinki between President Donald Trump and Russian President Vladimir Putin, he defended Trump against the statements made against him, such as the claim the summit had triggered an American "national security crisis". In December 2017, Maté interviewed Luke Harding on The Real News Network about Harding's book about the Russian interference to help Trump, Collusion: Secret Meetings, Dirty Money, and How Russia Helped Donald Trump Win. Vanity Fair described Maté as "a polite but dogged skeptic who administered a memorable vivisection" to Harding during the interview.

Maté earned an Izzy Award in April 2019 for his work "taking a factual, meticulous approach to the overhyped, over-exaggerated Russia election-collusion story" and for challenging press coverage of Robert Mueller's Special Counsel investigation.

In November 2019, Maté suggested that former CIA director John Brennan had impure reasons for the investigation into Russian links in a November 2019 article for Real Clear Investigations.

In December 2019, Maté appeared on the Tucker Carlson Tonight talk show on Fox News and said that people "are accepting the claim that Russia hacked the DNC, even though there's been no evidence yet". Maté said that the "claims" came from "discredited intelligence officials". After numerous investigations into the 2016 election interference, U.S. intelligence agencies reported with "high confidence" that Russia was the culprit in the DNC cyberattacks.

In May 2020, Maté stated: "All of the available evidence showed just how baseless [Russiagate] was". He said those who resisted Trump's administration were distracted by the "conspiracy theory that he conspired with or was blackmailed by Russia".

=== Douma and the Organisation for the Prohibition of Chemical Weapons ===
Maté has questioned the Douma chemical attack, a 2018 chemical warfare attack launched in the city of Douma, Syria by the military of the Ba'athist regime led by Bashar al-Assad. Maté alleged that there has been a "cover up". His claims are based on his interpretation of private correspondence, released by WikiLeaks, between two former Organisation for the Prohibition of Chemical Weapons (OPCW) inspectors, in which one said there was no evidence of chlorine being used as a weapon in Douma. According to the director general of the OPCW, Fernando Arias, the inspector's assumptions were wrong: the investigator had left his position with OPCW before it carried out most of its investigative work on Douma, and was unaware of the new technology the OPCW used to corroborate the allegation of a chemical weapons attack.

In September 2020, Maté testified at the United Nations at an Arria meeting hosted by the Russian Federation and China, about the alleged cover-up by the OPCW. In April 2021, he spoke at another Russia-hosted UN event on the topic. In March 2023, he spoke at an Arria meeting organized by the Russian Federation as a briefer invited by the Permanent Mission of the Russian Federation to the United Nations led by Vasily Nebenzia.

In May 2021, he accompanied Paul Larudee and other members of the Syria Solidarity Movement to observe the 2021 Syrian presidential election.

According to Muhammad Idrees Ahmad of New Lines Magazine, in 2021 Maté "obscured Assad’s responsibility" for the destruction of the Yarmouk Palestinian refugee camp. Ahmad accused Maté of "whitewashing of the murder of Palestinians in Yarmouk". According to Ahmad, Maté had previously criticized Forensic Architecture, a research group investigating Israeli war crimes, after the organization linked Assad to the Douma attack.

Maté and The Grayzone, for which he reports, have been recipients of the Association for Investment in Popular Action Committees's Serena Shim Award. According to Brian Whitaker writing in New Lines Magazine, some of the previous winners of the award advocated conspiracy theories and many supported the Syrian government.

In June 2022, the Institute for Strategic Dialogue (ISD) published an analysis of social media accounts, individuals, outlets and organisations who disseminated disinformation about the Syrian conflict. Maté is said in the report to be the most prolific spreader of disinformation about the Syrian conflict since 2020 among the 28 actors the group investigated. In a footnote added the following month to the London Observer article about the ISD report, Maté was quoted as saying "neither the study nor the Observer offer any evidence" for the assertion he is a spreader of disinformation and that the Institute for Strategic Dialogue "does not even attempt to refute a single claim of mine". Maté also alleged a conflict of interest because the ISD's funders included some western governments involved in the Syrian conflict.

=== Other journalism and commentary ===
In November 2020, Maté said that the appointment of Antony Blinken as Secretary of State and the possible nomination of Michèle Flournoy as Defense Secretary, showed that President-elect Joe Biden was "continuing with the hawkish playbook" he had followed throughout his career.

In February 2021, Maté was the first to report that Amnesty International had removed Russian opposition politician Alexei Navalny's status as a prisoner of conscience "given the fact that he advocated violence and discrimination and has not yet retracted such statements". Oliver Carroll wrote in The Independent that The Grayzone had "amplified" criticism of Navalny and "appears to have been privy to lobbying around the Amnesty decision".

Maté was critical of President Biden's response to Israel's attack on Gaza in May 2021. Maté said Biden's telephone call to Israeli Prime Minister Benjamin Netanyahu, in which Biden expressed his "unwavering support" for Israel's "right to defend itself", was "a green light for Netanyahu to continue massacring Palestinian civilians".

In an interview with Russell Brand, Maté said that the allegation of antisemitism was made against Jeremy Corbyn to delegitimise him and "to undermine criticism of Israel", since "the establishment actually can’t counter Jeremy Corbyn’s actual arguments and his real views". Maté said Corbyn made a mistake by tolerating the allegation and giving it "weight that it didn’t deserve".

Maté said that the Ukrainian Government, which came to power after the Maidan revolution, was a "fascist-infused coup". Regarding the 2022 Russian invasion of Ukraine, he said that the US was funding "proxy warfare" against Russia and preventing any prospect of peace for its own ends.

According to Chris York of New Lines Magazine, in May 2022, Maté said the link between Payton Gendron, the perpetrator of the 2022 Buffalo shooting, and Ukraine's Azov Brigade showed the U.S. was "allying with neo-Nazis" in order to "use Ukraine to fight a proxy war against Russia". Gendron was pictured wearing clothing emblazoned with the neo-Nazi "sonnenrad" symbol, which had previously been used by the Azov Brigade. York called the link "tenuous" and wrote that Gendron had previously expressed anti-Ukraine views on Discord and had cited Mintpress News, which York described as pro-Russian, in his manifesto.

In February 2023, The Bulwark website published an article by Cathy Young in which she accused Maté of sharing a deceptively cut video of an interview by Israel's ex-PM, Naftali Bennett, in which he talked about the breakdown in peace negotiations during the Russian invasion of Ukraine. According to Maté, Bennett said that Russia and Ukraine reached a preliminary peace agreement early in the war but the US rejected it. According to Young, Bennett said the peace talks stalled after the Bucha massacre.

In 2022, Maté stated that the US had no evidence of a "Uyghur genocide" and said that Michelle Bachelet, the head of OHCHR, had "failed to find a genocide" during her trip to Xinjiang. Writing for Haaretz, Alexander Reid Ross criticized Maté for sharing a report by the Italian Eurasian Mediterranean Research Center that denied there was persecution in Xinjiang. According to Ross, the Center is connected to Claudio Mutti, who, he said, has been described as a "Nazi-Maoist" blending neo-fascism with far-left ideologies.

The Canadian University of Calgary's School of Public Policy published a list of "Russian-influenced" social media accounts, which included Maté. According to the Brookings Institution, in 2023, Maté's twitter posts were the 15th most re-tweeted posts by Russian state-backed accounts.

== Publications ==
- Cold War, Hot War: How Russiagate Created Chaos from Washington to Ukraine. OR Books, 2022. (monography) ISBN 978-1682193655
- Their Blood, Our Bullets: The Hidden Story of the US–Russia War for Ukraine. OR Books, 2026. ISBN 9781682194591
