= Welcome to Nollywood =

- Directed by: Jamie Meltzer
- Produced by: Michael Cayce Lindner
- Cinematography: Bruce Dickson; Akinola Davies; Jamie Meltzer
- Edited by: Daniel J. Friedman
- Music by: Ben Krauss
- Distributed by: Cinema Guild
- Release date: April 12, 2007
- Running time: 56 minutes
- Country: United States
- Language: English

Welcome to Nollywood is a 2007 documentary film about the Nigerian movie industry, directed by Jamie Meltzer. It premiered at the Full Frame Documentary Film Festival, and also played at the Avignon Film Festival and the Melbourne International Film Festival in the summer of 2007.

== Premise ==
The Nigerian film industry, known as Nollywood, has exploded in the last ten years. Now the most popular cinema in all of West Africa—more popular even than imports of Hollywood or Bollywood films—the Nigerian film industry has distinguished itself by shooting all films (called video films there) on digital video. This has allowed production schedules to be compressed (films are shot in several days) and immediately brought to market (distribution consists of bringing films to Idumota electronics market in Lagos and selling them for home viewing). The volume of Nigerian video films is staggering; one estimate has a film being produced for each day of the year. Nollywood is now the third-largest film industry in the world, generating US$286 million per year for the Nigerian economy, yet this industry is virtually unknown outside of Africa.

The film looks into this emerging film industry, exploring its inner workings, economic challenges, and diverse array of films. Traveling to the country’s largest city, Lagos, Meltzer spent ten weeks following three Nigerian directors, each different in personality and style, as they shot their films about love, betrayal, war and the supernatural. Welcome to Nollywood tells the stories of these three directors and their latest productions, whilst also using interviews with scholars, actors, and journalists who discuss the Nigerian video film industry as a whole, its character and genres, as well as its impact on the culture of West Africa and Africans at home and abroad.

== Cast list (documentary subjects) ==
- Izu Ojukwu - Director
- Chico Ejiro - Producer/Director
- Don Pedro Obaseki - Producer/Director
- Charles Novia -Producer/Director
- Shan George - Actress
- Peace Anyiam-Fiberesima - Producer
- Tunde Kelani - Producer/Director
- J.T. Tom West - Actor
- Richard Mofe Damijo - Actor
- Francis Duru - Actor

== Reception ==
Review by Lisa Nesselson at Variety from the Avignon Film Festival: "Jamie Meltzer's Welcome to Nollywood boasts wall-to-wall bravado filtered through African-style entrepreneurship: Hook any of the producer-directors profiled here to a generator and the energy might just offset global reliance on oil. Docu is a must for cinema classrooms and fests and a hoot for curious auds on tube and beyond."

== See also ==
- Cinema of Nigeria
- This Is Nollywood
- Nollywood Babylon
