= Léopold Dion =

Canadian serial killer and sex offender (1920–1972)

- Born: 25 February 1920; Quebec, Canada
- Died: November 17, 1972 (aged 52); Archambault Institution, Quebec, Canada
- Cause of death: Stab wounds
- Other name: Monster of Pont-Rouge
- Status: Deceased
- Convictions: Capital murder Rape; Gross indecency (2 counts)
- Penalty: Death; commuted to life imprisonment

Details
- Victims: 4
- Span of crimes: April – May 1963
- Country: Canada
- Date apprehended: 27 May 1963

Léopold Dion (25 February 1920 – 17 November 1972) was a Canadian sex offender and serial killer who raped 21 boys, killing four; he was active in Quebec in 1963. He was nicknamed the "Monster of Pont-Rouge" (le monstre de Pont-Rouge).

== Crimes ==
Dion had a lengthy criminal history starting when he was 17, when he was convicted of gross indecency and sentenced to four months in prison. In 1939, he was charged with attempted murder, but acquitted. In 1940, Dion was sentenced to life in prison and lashed after being convicted of raping a 33-year-old schoolteacher in Pont-Rouge. He was paroled in 1956, but had his parole revoked after being convicted of gross indecency in 1957. Dion was paroled again in 1962.

Dion sexually abused 21 boys, killing four. He lured his victims by posing as a photographer.

His first murder victim was 12-year-old Guy Luckenuck, from Kénogami, Quebec, who was in Quebec City that day for clarinet lessons. They traveled together every week to take music lessons at the Conservatoire de musique du Québec à Québec in Québec City. Dion lured the boy by taking a series of snapshots with an old camera that had no film before claiming to want to continue elsewhere. He drove the boy into the country, where, in a remote spot, Dion then strangled him, and then buried him.

On 5 May 1963, Dion crossed paths with eight-year-old Alain Carrier and 10-year-old Michel Morel. He used the same ploy to lure them into his car, driving them to a run-down building in Saint-Raymond-de-Portneuf. With the former, he pretended to play prisoner so that he could tie the boy up in the cottage. Once he had been overcome, Dion turned to the latter one, whom he led outside, whereupon he asked the child to take his clothes off. Dion then strangled him with a garrote, before going back inside to smother the other boy.

On 26 May 1963, he met 13-year-old Pierre Marquis, who was also taken in by the fake photographer's promises. They were a couple of paces from a dune, the same one that had become Guy Luckenuck's grave a bit more than a month earlier. Once again, Dion asked his victim to pose naked. The child complied, but when Dion tried to assault him, he fought back before succumbing to the assault. Dion strangled Marquis.

== Arrest ==
Dion, who was still on parole, was arrested the day after his last murder. It was a description of Dion from another boy whom he had waylaid, but who had gotten away from him, that led to the police apprehending Dion. Once in prison, Dion held out for a month before he finally admitted to his crimes in detail to his interrogators. He then led investigators to the spot where he had buried the children's bodies.

== Trial ==
Criminal lawyer Guy Bertrand defended Dion at his trial. Dion was, in the end, charged with only one murder, Pierre Marquis', due to a lack of evidence in the other cases. On 10 April 1964, Judge Gérard Lacroix sentenced him to be hanged. The death sentence was commuted to life imprisonment by then Governor General of Canada Georges Vanier after Bertrand's appeal to the Supreme Court of Canada in the matter had failed.

== Death ==
On 17 November 1972, Dion was stabbed to death by a fellow inmate named Normand Champagne (also known as "Lawrence d'Arabie", or Lawrence of Arabia). Champagne, who was serving a life sentence for non-capital murder, was found not guilty by reason of insanity.

== See also ==
- List of serial killers by country
