= Waiting for Armageddon =

2009 film directed by Kate Davis, David Heilbroner and Franco Sacchi

- Directed by: Kate Davis, Franco Sacchi, David Heilbroner
- Produced by: Franco Sacchi; David Heilbroner
- Music by: Gary Lionelli
- Distributed by: Q-Ball Productions Inc; Eureka Film Productions LLC
- Release dates: January 28, 2009 (New York Jewish Film Festival); January 8, 2010 (United States)
- Running time: 74 minutes
- Country: United States
- Language: English

Waiting for Armageddon is a 2009 American documentary film that studies Armageddon theology and Christian eschatology. Some evangelicals in the United States believe that bible prophecy predicts events including the rapture and the Battle of Armageddon. The documentary raises questions regarding how this theology shapes United States and Middle East relations and how it may encourage an international holy war.

== Interviews ==
The documentary interviews Christians, Zionists, Jews and probes the politics and alliance between Evangelical Christians and Israel. This alliance is believed by some to set the stage for World War III.

== Structure ==
The documentary is structured around four stages of the apocalypse: 1) Rapture; 2) Tribulation; 3) Armageddon; 4) Millennialism.

== Reception ==
On the review aggregator website Rotten Tomatoes, 80% of 20 critics' reviews are positive.

== See also ==
- Left Behind: The Movie
- Tel Megiddo
