= Henry F. Hall Building =

Building in Montreal, Canada

- French: Édifice Henry F. Hall
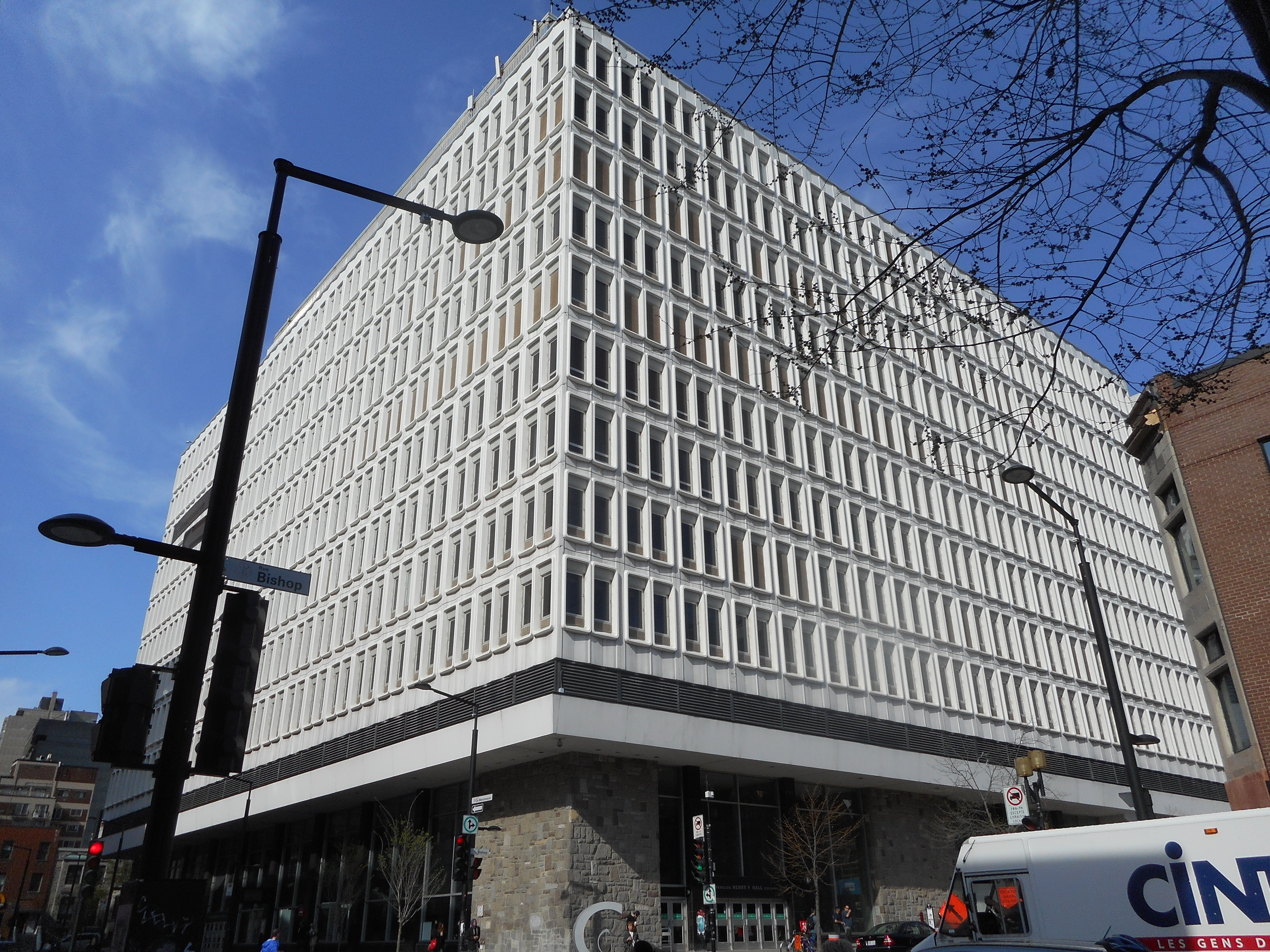
- Interactive map of the Henry F. Hall Building area

General information
- Location: 1455 de Maisonneuve Boulevard West, Montreal, Quebec, Canada
- Coordinates: 45.4972317°N 73.5788316°W
- Named for: Henry Foss Hall
- Inaugurated: 14 October 1966
- Cost: C$27.5 million
- Owner: Concordia University

Technical details
- Material: Modular pre-stressed concrete
- Floor count: 12
- Floor area: 782,000 square feet (72,700 m^{2})

Design and construction
- Architecture firm: Ross, Fish, Duschene and Barrett

Website
- concordia.ca

The Henry F. Hall Building (French: Édifice Henry F. Hall) is a building on the Sir George Williams Campus of Concordia University in Montreal, Quebec, Canada. Referred to as the 'H' building, it is located at 1455 de Maisonneuve Boulevard West, in between Mackay Street and Bishop Street in the Quartier Concordia neighbourhood.

== History ==
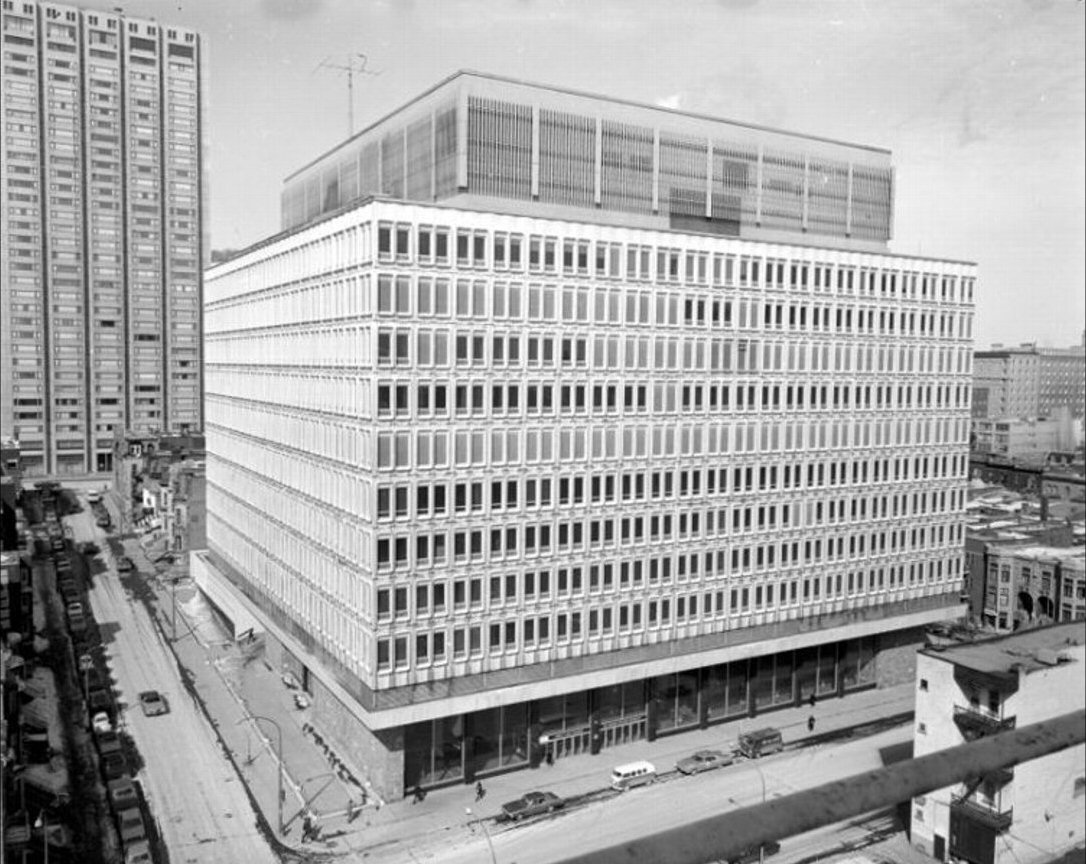
The Henry F. Hall Building in 1970

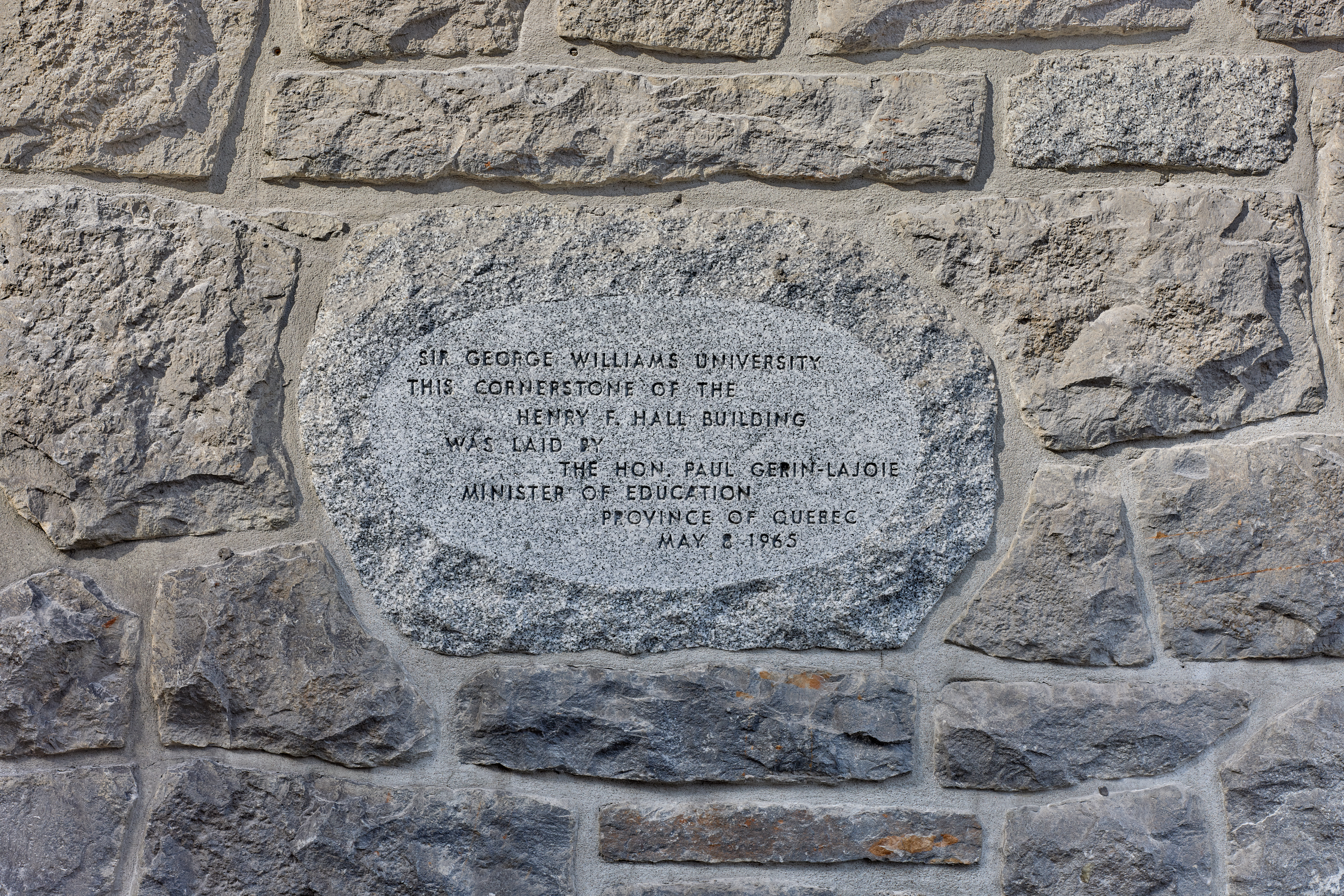
The building's cornerstone attesting to its being dedicated by Paul Gérin-Lajoie

The building is named for Henry Foss Hall, president of Sir George Williams University from 1956 to 1962.

It was designed by architecture firm Ross, Fish, Duschenes and Barrett, which hired James A. M. K. O'Beirne, to draw up the plans. It was inaugurated on 14 October 1966, the same day as the Montreal Metro.

In 1994-95, the building's exterior, having been damaged by pollution and the elements over the decades, was cleaned and re-painted.

It was the scene of the Sir George Williams Computer Riot in 1969, the Concordia University Massacre in 1992 and the Concordia University Netanyahu Riot in 2002.
