= Ben Addelman =

Canadian filmmaker

Ben Addelman is a Canadian documentary filmmaker, and is a director of: Discordia, Bombay Calling, Nollywood Babylon, Kivalina vs. Exxon, and Plastic People.

== Career ==
His first film Discordia (2004) follows three students during the aftermath of the Netanyahu Incident at Concordia University in Montreal in 2002, co-directed with Samir Mallal and produced by Adam Symansky from the National Film Board of Canada."Discordia". NFB Collection. National Film Board of Canada.

His second film, Bombay Calling (2006), follows the lives of telemarketers working outsourced jobs in a call center in Bombay (Mumbai), India, co-directed with Samir Mallal and produced by Adam Symansky from the National Film Board of Canada."Bombay Calling". NFB Collection. National Film Board of Canada.

His third film, Nollywood Babylon (2008) is a documentary about the popularity of Nigerian movies, with co-director Samir Mallal, co-produced with the National Film Board of Canada in association with the Canadian TV channel documentary Channel.

His fourth film, Kivalina v. Exxon (2011), follows the efforts of a small town in Alaska in a lawsuit against the oil and gas industries for climate change-related damages.

His fifth film, Plastic People (2024), investigates the threat of microplastics in human bodies and our addiction to plastic. He and co-director Ziya Tong won the Canadian Screen Award for Best Direction in a Documentary Program at the 13th Canadian Screen Awards in 2025.

He has directed documentary television for Vice, Disney+ and BBC, and in 2020, co-directed episodes of Becoming You for Apple TV+.

== Awards ==
- In 2009, the film Nollywood Babylon screened in the World Cinema Documentary section at the 2009 Sundance Film Festival."List of films at the 2009 Sundance Film Festival". Wikipedia.
- In 2011, the film Kivalina V. Exxon won Best Documentary at the Whistler Film Festival.
