= Jamie Meltzer =

American movie and documentary film director

Jamie Meltzer is an American movie and documentary film director. He has made "True Conviction", "Off the Charts: The Song-Poem Story", "Welcome to Nollywood", "La Caminata" (a short film), and the feature-length documentary film "Informant". He teaches documentary film production in the Art Department of Stanford University, as part of the MFA Program in Documentary Film.

== Films ==
"True Conviction" (2017), a feature-length documentary, follows a group of exonerated ex-prisoners who start a detective agency, work to rebuild their lives, and struggle to fix the criminal justice system. The film was awarded a Special Jury Mention at the 2017 Tribeca Film Festival.

"Informant" (2012) a feature-length documentary film that investigates the turbulent journey of Brandon Darby, a radical leftist activist turned FBI informant turned right-wing Tea Party activist. It premiered at the 2012 San Francisco International Film Festival,"With uncommon restraint, Meltzer delivers a fascinating study that transcends political chest beating. Informant raises the possibility of fluid truth in a system addicted to false binaries." The film won the Best Documentary Jury Award at the Austin Film Festival in October 2012.

"La Caminata" (2009) is a short film exploring the efforts of a small Mexican town to combat the migration of their community to the U.S. The town, El Alberto, puts on a weekly tourist event called the Caminata, where they simulate a nighttime "crossing" of the border, complete with balaclava-clad coyotes and simulated border patrol in hot pursuit. The film played at film festivals in 2009, including the AFI Silverdocs Festival and the True/False Film Festival.

"Welcome to Nollywood" (2007) is a documentary about the explosive phenomenon of Nigerian movies. It aired on PBS as part of the AfroPop Series in 2008.

"Off the Charts: The Song-Poem Story" (2003), an hour-long documentary, marks his feature film debut. It played at festivals worldwide, and was screened on PBS' Independent Lens series in 2003.

"Pegasus" (1998), a short 16 mm film made while he was a graduate student at San Francisco State University, chronicles the adventures of a gay motorcycle club on a joy ride in Marin County. This film was screened at the 1998 San Francisco International Lesbian & Gay Film Festival as well as other venues.
