= George H.W. Bush (film) =

2020 television documentary film

- Genre: Documentary
- Written by: Austin Hoyt
- Directed by: Austin Hoyt
- Narrated by: David Ogden Stiers
- Music by: Michael Bacon
- Country of origin: United States
- Original language: English

Production
- Producers: Austin Hoyt; Callie Taintor Wiser
- Cinematography: Stephen McCarthy
- Editors: Bernice Schneider (Part One); Jon Neuburger (Part Two)
- Running time: 210 minutes
- Production company: Austin Hoyt Productions

Original release
- Network: PBS
- Release: May 5, 2008

George H.W. Bush is a 2008 two-part biographical television film about former United States President George H. W. Bush. Produced by PBS for the American Experience documentary program, it recounts Bush's life from his childhood and experience in World War II up to the end of his presidency in 1993. Written, co-produced, and directed by Austin Hoyt, the film aired on PBS in two parts on May 5 and 6, 2008.

== Interviewees ==
- Barbara Bush, first lady
- Richard Darman, budget director
- Marlin Fitzwater, press secretary
- Mikhail Gorbachev
- John Robert Greene, presidential historian
- Doro Bush Koch, daughter
- Timothy Naftali, biographer
- Colin Powell, chairman, Joint Chiefs of Staff
- Condoleezza Rice

== Home media ==
George H.W. Bush was made available for streaming at the official American Experience "Presidents" website beginning on May 7, 2008. The film was later released on DVD by PBS on August 26, 2008. On the same day, it was also released in an American Experience DVD box set collecting its films about United States presidents.
