= Gundega Cenne =

Latvian-Canadian artist and educator

- Gundega Cenne, from a 1966 publication.
- Born: Gundega Aria Janfelds; 1933; Riga
- Died: December 16, 2009 (aged 75–76); Ottawa
- Other names: Gundega Janfelde; Gundega Janfelds-Cenne
- Occupation: Artist

Gundega Aria Janfelds Cenne (1933 – December 16, 2009) was a Latvian-born Canadian artist and art educator.

== Early life ==
Gundega Aria Janfelds was born in Riga, the daughter of Valentins Janfelds and Hilda-Alma Freimanis Janfelds. Her family left Latvia in 1945, lived in a displaced persons camp in Germany, and moved to Montreal in 1949. She graduated from Montreal High School for Girls. She completed a Bachelor of Fine Arts degree at Sir George Williams University in 1956. She also earned a teaching credential at McGill University, and pursued further art training at the Montreal Museum of Fine Arts.

== Career ==
Cenne made filmstrip illustrations for the Montreal Protestant School Board when she was still a teenager. She illustrated a 1954 French-language textbook, Jouons Book 1. She taught art, and was a member of the Independent Artists' Association of Montreal. She exhibited her paintings in shows in Montreal, Paris, New York, and Toronto as a young woman.

She was a full-time independent artist after she was seriously injured in a car accident in 1963. "I keep my wheelchair condition concealed whenever I am not present, or the public has only seen my photograph," she wrote in 1966, "for I wish to keep my work and my physical condition as two separate entities. I am a painter in my own right, and my physical condition has nothing to do with it." She held a retrospective exhibit in 1969, in Owen Sound, where she lived. In 1975 she was part of a show of six Latvian-Canadian artists at the National Library of Canada. In 1986, her work was exhibited at the Latvian Lutheran Church in Brookline, Massachusetts.

== Personal life ==
Cenne married orthodontist Ivars Cenne; they had two children, Peter and Lauma. Her daughter, Lauma Kristina Cenne, became a textile artist. Her mother and her husband both died in 2001; she died in 2009, aged 76 years, in Ottawa.
