= Concordia University massacre =

1992 school shooting in Montreal, Canada

Coordinates: 45.4972°N 73.5789°W

- The Henry F. Hall Building, where the shooting occurred, pictured in 2013
- Location: Montreal, Quebec, Canada
- Date: August 24, 1992; 34 years ago (UTC-4)
- Target: Staff at Concordia University
- Attack type: School shooting, mass shooting, mass murder
- Weapons: Snubnosed Smith & Wesson .38-calibre 5-shot Revolver; MEB pistol (6.35mm); Bersa pistol (7.65mm)
- Deaths: 4
- Injuries: 1
- Perpetrator: Valery Fabrikant
- Motive: Displaced aggression

The Concordia University massacre was a school shooting on August 24, 1992, in which Valery I. Fabrikant, an associate professor of mechanical engineering, killed four colleagues and wounded a staff member at Concordia University in Montreal, Quebec, Canada. He was convicted of murder and sentenced to life in prison.

== Overview ==
=== Perpetrator ===
Fabrikant was a mechanical engineering associate professor who had worked at Concordia University for 13 years. He had begun as a technician, and long demonstrated disruptive behaviour towards students, staff members and other academics, described as ranging from "undesirable to intolerable", with which the university had struggled to deal. One student claimed in a 1982 filed police report that he had raped her and dislocated her shoulder. In addition, he had presented academic challenges in teaching and supervision. As early as 1989, two people reported him saying, "I know how people get what they want, they shoot a lot of people."

Relations between Fabrikant and the university became increasingly strained in late 1991 and the spring of 1992. Colleagues became alarmed after he turned his aggression upon them. After being denied tenure, Fabrikant charged members of the engineering department with questionable financial dealings and improper credit for research work. Because of his unacceptable behaviour in addition to the charges, he faced dismissal on grounds of the intimidation and harassment of fellow staff members. He was also under a contempt of court charge for behaviour in a lawsuit against colleagues regarding credit for professional articles.

=== Shooting ===
On August 24, Fabrikant entered the Engineering department at Concordia with three guns and ammunition in his briefcase. In his shooting rampage on the ninth floor of the Henry F. Hall Building, he killed Electrical and Computer Engineering Departmental Chair Phoivos Ziogas and professors Matthew Douglass, Michael Hogben, and Aaron Jaan Saber (known as Jaan Saber). Fabrikant wounded Elizabeth Horwood, a departmental staff secretary. None of the victims were personally involved in the controversy which Fabrikant had started.

Fabrikant was charged with murder and assault, convicted and sentenced to life in prison. He was denied parole in 2015 and again in 2022.

== Events ==
Around 1:30 p.m. on Monday, August 24, 1992, Fabrikant walked onto the ninth floor of the Henry F. Hall Building. He was carrying a briefcase that contained three handguns (a snub-nosed Smith & Wesson .38-calibre 5-shot revolver, a German-made 6.35mm Meb pistol with a 6-round magazine, and an Argentinian-made 7.65mm Bersa pistol with an 8-round magazine) and a large amount of ammunition.

First he went looking for Dean of Engineering and Computer Science Srikanta Swamy and M.O.M (Sam) Osman (the chair of the mechanical engineering department). Neither was present. Next, he headed to his own office where he was scheduled to meet Michael Hogben, the president of the Concordia University Faculty Association (CUFA). According to police, Hogben attempted to give Fabrikant a letter setting out the conditions under which he would be allowed to visit the CUFA offices. The letter noted Fabrikant's access would be restricted because his behaviour was causing those who worked there "considerable distress". Fabrikant took out his .38 calibre pistol and shot Hogben three times. Hogben fell to the floor and died shortly thereafter.

A faculty colleague, Aaron Jaan Saber, called out from his office nearby. Fabrikant crossed the hall and fired two shots into Saber, who died in hospital the next day. Back in the hall, heading back to Osman's office again, Fabrikant fired at Elizabeth Horwood, wounding her in the thigh. He worked his way through the ninth floor corridors to the other side of the building and into the office of Phoivos Ziogas (chair of the electrical and computer-engineering department), who was talking with colleague Otto Schwelb. Fabrikant shot Ziogas twice; he died in hospital a month later. He scuffled with Schwelb, who grabbed the pistol. Unaware that Fabrikant had two other guns in his briefcase, Schwelb went back to tend the injured Ziogas.

Urgences-santé forces, led by Paramedic Assistant Chief Anthony DiMonte, coordinated with police using new protocols learned from the 1989 Polytechnique shooting.

Matthew Douglass (a professor of civil engineering known to be close to Dean Swamy), tried to reason with Fabrikant when he arrived at the dean's office. Fabrikant shot him four times, killing him almost instantly.

Fabrikant took a security guard and another professor (George Abdou) hostage, locked himself in an office, and called an emergency operator. He said he had just committed several murders and wanted to talk to a TV reporter. He stayed on the line for an hour. When he briefly put his gun down to adjust the phone, Abdou kicked it away and the security guard overpowered him.

== Aftermath ==
The university commissioned two Independent Committees of Inquiry to investigate aspects of the August events. In addition, it established task forces to work on internal policy and procedures. In April 1994, the Independent Committee of Inquiry into Academic and Scientific Integrity, headed by H. W. Arthurs, former president of York University, presented their report, entitled Integrity in Scholarship (informally known as the Arthurs Report). It noted issues at Concordia and other production-driven research institutions. It stated: "We have confirmed the validity of a number of Dr. Fabrikant's more specific allegations" about financial mismanagement and questions about scholarship practices such as article attribution. The report noted that Fabrikant's allegations were not motivated by concern for the public good, however. Instead, they were the "ultimate revenge" of a desperate man who had already tried blackmail and threats against officials.

An independent review was conducted by John Scott Cowan, former faculty association president and former vice-president (administration) of the University of Ottawa, who was commissioned to study Fabrikant's employment history and related human-resource issues at Concordia University. He documented years of behavioural problems by Fabrikant. In addition, he identified problems common to university environments, where disruptive behaviour has sometimes been excused under the mantle of academic freedom and because many of the academics involved had little experience as managers. He noted that often academic administrators were not comfortable as managers and needed additional training as reported in May 1994 on Lessons from the Fabrikant File (also known as the Cowan Report). His report included recommendations for how the university could improve its internal communication and management of academics and departments.

In their investigation of academic credentials, a journalist team from the Montreal Gazette discovered that Fabrikant was not a political dissident as he had claimed. Instead, he had emigrated from the USSR after having been fired from a succession of posts for his threatening and disruptive behaviour.

As a result, Concordia University made a number of changes to its ethics rules and administrative procedures to improve operations, the integrity of scholarship, and management of faculty and staff. In addition, it established conflict-resolution workshops and resources. The university fired Fabrikant 17 days after the rampage.

Fabrikant served his sentence at Archambault Prison in Sainte-Anne-Des-Plaines, Quebec. He was denied parole in 2015 and again in 2022. On 27 June 2026, he died in prison.

== Legal proceedings ==
During his trial, Fabrikant came across as petty, vindictive, unrepentant and vain, along with being rude and hostile to the judges, one of whom he called a "low little crook", and displayed the same attitude to psychiatrists who testified on whether he was sane enough for the proceedings to continue.

During the trial Fabrikant acted as his own lawyer (after firing ten lawyers in the process) and called 75 witnesses for his defence, but in the end it took the jury only seven hours to find him guilty of four charges of first-degree murder, attempted murder, and two hostage charges. This legal decision did not stop him from seeking legal challenges to the court's decision. In 2011 a Superior Court judge dismissed a suit by Fabrikant against his colleagues that had been filed in 1992. He filed so many lawsuits while behind bars that Canadian courts declared him a "vexatious litigant" and his computer access while in prison was limited.

== Legacy ==
- Four large granite study tables were placed in the foyer of the Hall Building as a memorial to the slain professors. A nearby wall plaque memorializes the event.
- Concordia's Board of Governors had earlier adopted a policy banning firearms on the university campus. After Fabrikant's murders, the university joined the Coalition for Gun Control and gathered signatures for a petition calling for tougher national gun laws. In March 1994 Concordia representatives presented members of Parliament with a 200,000-signature petition to ban the private ownership of handguns in Canada.
- In addition, the university adopted new rules governing financial accountability and scientific integrity, improvements in process at the time of the August 1992 events. The Internal Audit function was also restructured.
- In 1995 the university adopted "The Code of Rights & Responsibilities" and named an Adviser on the Code. It set out standards of conduct for all members of the university. Further work was done on a new code of ethics, resulting in a partial version of "The Code of Ethics: Guidelines for Ethical Actions" being adopted in 1995. The full version was adopted in 1997.
- The university created initiatives related to civil behaviour and conflict resolution, including the Peace and Conflict Resolution Series that began in 2003.
- Morris Wolfe's 2002 article on the events won a Canadian Association of Journalists Award for Investigative Journalism.

== See also ==
- List of massacres in Canada
