= The Newburgh Sting =

- The Newburgh Sting (2014) documentary film
- Directed by: Kate Davis, David Heilbroner
- Written by: David Heilbroner
- Produced by: Kate Davis, David Heilbroner
- Production company: Q-Ball Productions
- Release dates: April 20, 2014 (Tribeca Film Festival); July 21, 2014 (United States)
- Running time: 80 minutes
- Country: United States
- Language: English

The Newburgh Sting is a 2014 documentary film about the Federal Bureau of Investigation's sting operation on four Muslim men involved in the 2009 Bronx terrorism plot. Beginning in 2008, an FBI informant, Shaheed Hussain, recorded hours of conversations with the men who were ultimately arrested and convicted of planting three non-functional bombs next to two synagogues in Riverdale, Bronx and for planning to use Stinger missiles to shoot down United States military cargo planes near Newburgh, New York. The documentary shows that the four men were coaxed into participating in the plot by an FBI informant and offered incentives including $250,000. The men's lawyers, including Sam Braverman, who is featured prominently in the film, argue that this was a case of entrapment. Also featured in the film is Michael German, a former undercover FBI agent and a current fellow in the Brennan Center for Justice's Liberty and National Security program.

== Awards ==
The film was shown at the Tribeca Film Festival. It won a Peabody Award and a Founder's Prize special award at the Traverse City Film Festival.
