= Franco Sacchi =

Italian filmmaker

- Born: Zambia
- Occupations: Director, producer, editor, cinematographer, video journalist
- Years active: 2002–present
- Website: http://www.francosacchi.com

Franco Sacchi is an Italian filmmaker and editor. He is most notable as the director of critically acclaimed films This Is Nollywood, American Eunuchs and Waiting for Armageddon.

== Personal life ==
He was born Zambia and raised in Italy.

== Career ==
In 2003, he made his first documentary, American Eunuchs. The film was screened and made the official selection at International Documentary Film Festival Amsterdam (IDFA). In 2005, he made his direction This Is Nollywood, a documentary about the Nigerian film industry. The film later won Audience Award at the Abuja International Film Festival. With the success of the film, Franco co-directed and filmed Waiting for Armageddon, which was released in 2010.

Besides directing films, he served as a senior instructor at Avid Technology from 1996 to 2002.

== Filmography ==
Year	Film	Role	Genre	Ref.
2002	Hunting in America	Editor	Short film	
2002	Easy Listening	Post-production coordinator	TV movie documentary	
2003	American Eunuchs	Director, editor, cinematographer, producer	Documentary feature	
2003	The Letter: An American Town and the 'Somali Invasion'	Editor	Documentary	
2004	The Pursuit of Pleasure	Editor	Documentary	
2004	L'assassinio di via Belpoggio	Actor: Railway Station Cop	Short film	
2005	This Is Nollywood	Director, editor, cinematographer, producer	Documentary feature	
2006	Plastic Disasters	Digital post-production	TV movie documentary	
2010	Waiting for Armageddon	Director, editor, cinematographer, producer, production coordinator	Documentary feature	
2009	It's a Young Country: Turkey and Akbank	Director, editor, cinematographer	Documentary short	
2010	Stonewall Uprising	Technical advisor	Documentary	
2010	Paths of Hope: Livelihoods in Three Caribbean Communities of Costa Rica	Director, editor, cinematographer	Documentary short	
2010	A Tiny Spark	Director, editor, cinematographer, producer	Video documentary short	
2011	American Experience	Technical advisor	TV series documentary	
2014	The Covenant with America's Wounded Warriors	Director, editor, cinematographer	Documentary short	
2017	In My Mother's House	Editor	Documentary	

== See also ==
- Cinema of Africa
