= Concordia University Netanyahu riot =

2002 pro-Palestinian demonstration in Montreal, Canada

- Part of the Israeli–Palestinian conflict
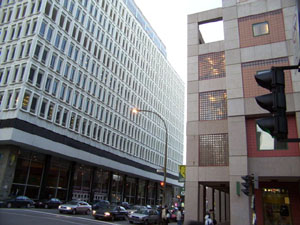
- The Henry F. Hall Building of the Sir George Williams Campus, where the riot took place
- Date: September 9, 2002; 24 years ago
- Location: Montreal, Quebec, Canada; 45.497°N 73.579°W
- Caused by: Pro-Palestinian opposition to a visit from Israel's former prime minister Benjamin Netanyahu, who was invited by the Jewish student organization Hillel to speak on campus

Parties
Pro-Palestinian protesters	Concordia University: Montreal City Police Service

Casualties
- Arrested: 5, including Aaron Maté

On September 9, 2002, a riot broke out at the Sir George Williams Campus of Concordia University in Montreal, Quebec, in anticipation of a visit from then-former Israeli prime minister Benjamin Netanyahu. The visit, to be held at noon in the Henry F. Hall Building, was cancelled after pro-Palestinian students entered the building in which Netanyahu's speech was being held by breaking a glass window. Netanyahu had been invited by the Jewish student organization Hillel. Several hundred demonstrators blocked the event's attendees from entering the building.

The incident took place amidst the Second Intifada, which had begun two years earlier, marking a period of increased violence in the Israeli–Palestinian conflict until 2005.

== Events ==
The attendees were escorted to the auditorium where the lecture was to take place. Protesters broke into the building through a side door, but were blocked by Montreal Police on the escalators. Afterwards, the protesters began hurling furniture from the mezzanine to the lobby, and officers responded by firing pepper spray at them, which resulted in the evacuation of the building and the cancellation of classes for the remainder of the day.

Around 1 p.m., a large window was shattered by the rioters. At approximately the same time, a second window on the building's first floor, on the western side, was broken when rioters threw a metal barricade. Five demonstrators were arrested, including vice president of the student council Aaron Maté, and an additional 12 faced internal disciplinary hearings under Concordia's Code of Rights and Responsibilities.

== Aftermath ==
Netanyahu was not present at the protest, having remained at the Ritz-Carlton Hotel. He later accused the activists of supporting terrorism and "mad zealotry," stating that "They're supporting Saddam Hussein, they're supporting Arafat, they're supporting Bin Laden."

In the wake of the riot, Concordia University instituted additional measures to avert future incidents, including the banning of any events related to the Israeli–Palestinian conflict for one month, as well as enabling the use of new student disciplinary rules in case of emergency.

The 2004 documentary Discordia, produced by the National Film Board of Canada, documents the fallout from the riot by following three young Concordia campus activists, including Maté. In 2003, GlobalTV also aired the documentary Confrontation at Concordia, produced by Martin Himel. Raymond Beauchemin, a 1992 Concordia University graduate (MA, English), wrote the novel These Days Are Nights after being inspired by the events of the protest.

== See also ==
- List of incidents of civil unrest in Canada
