= List of Concordia University people =

The following list of Concordia University people includes notable administrators, alumni and faculty of Concordia University, and its predecessors Loyola College and Sir George Williams University.

== Rectors and presidents ==
The following is a list of rectors and presidents of Concordia University, and its predecessors, Loyola College and Sir George Williams University.

Rectors and presidents of Concordia University
Name	Term start	Term end
Dr. John W. O'Brien, Rector	August 24, 1974	May 31, 1984
Dr. Patrick Kenniff, Rector	June 1, 1984	May 25, 1994
Dr. Charles Bertrand, Interim Rector	May 26, 1994	August 14, 1995
Dr. Frederick Lowy, President	August 15, 1995	July 31, 2005
Dr. Claude Lajeunesse, President	August 1, 2005	October 31, 2007
Michael Di Grappa, Interim President	November 1, 2007	July 31, 2008
Dr. Judith Woodsworth	August 1, 2008	December 22, 2010
Dr. Frederick Lowy, Interim President	February 2, 2011	July 31, 2012
Dr. Alan Shepard	August 1, 2012	June 30, 2019
Dr. Graham Carr	December 12, 2019	present

Rectors and presidents of Loyola College
Name	Term start	Term end
Gregory O’Bryan, S.J., President	August 15, 1896	July 4, 1899
William Doherty, S.J., President	July 4, 1899	October 27, 1899
Gregory O’Bryan, S.J., President	October 27, 1899	June 23, 1901
Arthur E. Jones, S.J., President	June 23, 1901	August 3, 1904
Adrian D. Turgeon, S.J., Rector	August 3, 1904	August 7, 1905
Gregory O’Bryan, S.J., Rector	August 7, 1905	June 6, 1907
Alexander A. Gagnieur, S.J., Rector	August 10, 1907	May 4, 1913
Thomas McMahon, S.J., Rector	May 4, 1913	August 5, 1917
Alexander A. Gagnieur, S.J., Rector	August 5, 1917	March 1, 1918
John Milway Filion, S.J., Rector	March 1, 1918	July 1, 1918
William H. Hingston, S.J., Rector	July 1, 1918	July 31, 1925
Erle Gladstone Bartlett, S.J., Rector	July 31, 1925	August 9, 1930
Thomas J. MacMahon, S.J., Rector	August 9, 1930	July 15, 1935
Hugh C. McCarthy, S.J. Rector	July 15, 1935	July 11, 1940
Edward M. Brown, S.J., Rector	July 11, 1940	July 4, 1948
John F. McCaffrey, S.J., Rector	July 4, 1948	June 17, 1954
Gerald F. Lahey, S.J., Rector	June 17, 1954	August 15, 1959
Patrick G. Malone, S.J., President	August 15, 1959	August 16, 1974

Principals of Sir George Williams University
Name	Term start	Term end
Anson W. Young	1925	1928
Frederick O. Stredder	1928	1935
Kenneth E. Norris	1936	1956
Henry F. Hall	1956	1962
Robert C. Rae	1962	1968
Douglass B. Clarke, Acting Principal	1968	1969
John W. O'Brien	1969	August 23, 1974

== Chancellors ==
The following is a list of chancellors of Concordia University, and its predecessor Sir George Williams University.

Chancellors of Concordia University
Name	Term start	Term end
Henry J. Hemens	August 24, 1974	December 31, 1981
W. Earle McLaughlin	January 1, 1982	December 31, 1986
Alan B. Gold	February 5, 1987	September 30, 1992
Jeanne Sauvé	October 1, 1992	January 26, 1993
Eric H. Molson	July 1, 1993	December 31, 2005
David P. O'Brien	January 1, 2006	December 31, 2010
L. Jacques Ménard	January 1, 2011	December 31, 2014
Jonathan Wener	January 1, 2015	December 31, 2024
Gina Cody	May 1, 2024	present

Chancellors of Sir George Williams University
Name	Term start	Term end
B.W. Roberts	March 21, 1960	September 24, 1965
Fraser Fulton	September 25, 1965	June 6, 1971
C. F. Carsley	June 6, 1971	August 10, 1973
Henry J. Hemens	August 10, 1973	August 24, 1974

== Notable faculty ==
- Marguerite Andersen - writer and educator
- Theresa H. Arriola - cultural anthropologist
- Margaret Atwood - poet, author and literary critic (instructor in English, 1967)
- William P. Byers - professor emeritus of mathematics; author of How Mathematicians Think and The Blind Spot
- Ed Enos - Founding Chairman of the Concordia Department of Exercise Science, Associate Professor of the department, former Assistant Dean, Faculty of Arts and Science, and member of Concordia's first Senate
- Marc Gervais - film professor, Jesuit, and founding director of the Loyola Institute for Studies in International Peace
- Henry Habib - professor emeritus
- Michael Laucke - classical guitar (professor of guitar in 1976 to 1977)
- Myrna Lashley - psychologist and professor
- Kai Nielsen - adjunct professor in the philosophy department, contemporary atheist and left-wing political philosopher
- Mordecai Richler - author (writer-in-residence)
- Vaira Vīķe-Freiberga - former president of Latvia; first female president of Latvia
- Chantal David - controversial mathematics professor accused of antisemitism

=== Concordia ===
- Fariborz Haghighat - professor
- Gad Saad (born 1964) - professor, Lebanese-born Jewish Canadian evolutionary behavioral scientist
- Jane Stewart - professor emeritus of psychology

== Notable alumni ==
=== Sir George Williams ===
- Howard Alper - chemist
- Sacvan Bercovitch - professor, Harvard University
- David Bercuson - historian
- Lawrence Bergman - Quebec provincial politician
- Warren Cohen - composer and conductor
- Terry Copp - military historian
- Rosie Douglas - former Prime Minister of Dominica
- William McLean Hamilton - Ontario federal politician
- Jim Hawkes - Canadian federal politician
- Stuart McLean - broadcaster and author
- Henry Mintzberg - professor, McGill University
- Guido Molinari - artist
- Gordon O'Connor - Canadian Minister of National Revenue
- Richard Patten - Canadian federal politician
- Richard Pound - Chairman of the World Anti-Doping Agency; Chancellor of McGill University
- E. Annie Proulx - author, winner of the Pulitzer Prize for Fiction
- Mordecai Richler - author
- Alfie Roberts - political activist, professional cricketer, and Montreal community worker
- George Springate - professional football player and Quebec politician
- Rod Sykes - former leader of the Alberta Social Credit Party and former Mayor of Calgary
- Donald Tarlton - as Donald K. Donald, a concert promoter, music manager and record label owner
- Theodore Fairhurst - artist, real estate entrepreneur, world record holder mountain climber

=== Loyola ===
- Tony Burman - journalist and editor-in-chief at CBC
- Lucien Cardin - Canadian federal politician
- Larry Carriere - former NHL hockey player, current assistant general manager of the Montreal Canadiens
- Dominic D’Alessandro - President and CEO of Manulife Financial
- Don Ferguson - actor and comedian
- Hana Gartner - journalist
- Marc Gervais (1950) - Jesuit and film professor at Concordia University
- Bernard Lonergan - philosopher and theologian; regarded as one of the most important thinkers of the 20th century
- L. Ian MacDonald (born 1947) - author, columnist, broadcaster, and diplomat.
- John C. Major - justice of the Supreme Court of Canada
- Brian McKenna - journalist
- Richard Monette - actor and director
- Athol Murray - priest and educator
- Georges Vanier - former Governor General of Canada

=== Concordia ===
- Victor Arroyo - video artist
- Alex Tyrrell - leader of the Green Party of Quebec.
- Nadia Myre - visual artist
- Dareen Abughaida - Al Jazeera news anchor
- Yasser Harrak - writer, commentator, human rights activist
- Pietro Amato - musician
- Louise Archambault - film director and screenwriter
- Torill Kove - film director and animator and winner of 2007 Academy Award for Animated Short Film
- Jérémy Comte - film director
- Will Arnett - actor, Arrested Development TV series; left after one semester to pursue acting
- Melissa Auf der Maur - rock musician
- Maziar Bahari - journalist and filmmaker, Newsweek
- René Balcer - Emmy Award-winning writer and producer, Law & Order and Law & Order: Criminal Intent
- Chris Banks - poet
- Adam Basanta (born 1985) - artist and experimental composer
- Yves Bélanger - cinematographer
- Evan Beloff - screenwriter and director
- Andy Borodow (born 1969) - Canadian Olympic wrestler, Maccabiah champion, Commonwealth champion
- Pan Bouyoucas - author, playwright and translator
- Annie Briard - artist
- Edwin Orion Brownell - neo-classical composer and concert pianist
- Gary Burns - screenwriter and director
- Brian Busby - author
- Pascale Bussières - Québécoise actress
- Craig Button (born 1963) - ice hockey analyst for TSN and former National Hockey League executive
- Cecil Castellucci - author
- Régine Chassagne - musician, Arcade Fire
- Gina Cody - engineer
- Warren Cohen - composer and conductor
- Steven Cojocaru - fashion maven; Entertainment Tonight correspondent (2003–present)
- Karen Connelly - author
- Charlotte Cornfield (born 1988) - singer-songwriter
- Daniel Cross - filmmaker
- Dolly Dastoor - clinical psychologist and Zoroastrian leader
- Joe David - Nuu-chah-nulth artist
- Barbara Davidson - Photographer, 2011 Pulitzer Prize winner
- Bob Delaney - Ontario provincial politician
- André Desmarais - President and Co-CEO of Power Corporation of Canada
- Caroline Desrochers - politician
- Ann Diamond - poet and short story writer
- Kadie Karen Diekmeyer - internet personality and animal rights activist
- Farell Duclair - Canadian football player
- Mario Dumont - ex-political leader of the provincial ADQ party
- Barbara Dunkelman - actress and internet personality
- Darren Entwistle - President and CEO of Telus
- Emil Fackenheim (1916–2003) - philosopher
- Jocelyn Faubert - professor at the University of Montreal
- Maxyne Finkelstein - non-profit professional
- Sydney Finkelstein - professor at the Tuck School of Business at Dartmouth College
- Raymonde Folco - Canadian federal politician
- Tess Fragoulis - author
- Elyse Gasco - author
- Erin Gee - media artist
- Mireille Gingras - neurobiologist; founder and CEO of HUYA Bioscience International
- Jonathan Goldstein - Author, humorist, and radio host
- Angela Grossmann - artist
- Rawi Hage - novelist, photographer
- Yasser Harrak - writer and human rights activist
- Richard Harrison - poet
- Paul Hartal - painter, poet
- Elisabeth Harvor - author
- Mohamed Hashish - research scientist
- Stephen Henighan - author
- Goldie Hershon (1941–2020), activist
- Christopher Hinton - film animator
- Jennifer Hollett - former MuchMusic VJ
- Anna Hopkins - actress
- Anthony Housefather (born 1973) - Mayor of Côte Saint-Luc, Quebec, Member of Parliament
- Geof Isherwood - comic book illustrator
- Clément Jodoin - ice hockey coach
- Emmett Johns - founder of Dans la Rue
- Clark Johnson - American actor, Homicide: Life on the Street TV series
- Christine Jones - Scenic designer
- Garry Kallos (born 1956) - Olympic wrestler and sambo competitor
- Ibi Kaslik - author
- Mark Kelley - CBC reporter
- Adam Kelly - writer
- Jonah Keri - author
- Arsinée Khanjian - actress
- Donovan King - theatre artist
- Torill Kove - animator; 2006 Academy Award winner
- Spencer Krug - musician, Wolf Parade, Sunset Rubdown, Frog Eyes, Swan Lake, Fifths of Seven
- Jeff Kuhner - broadcaster and journalist
- Micheline Lanctôt - film director and actress
- Michelle Latimer - actress on Paradise Falls (Showcase)
- David Lemieux - Grateful Dead Legacy Manager and Archivist
- Peter Lenkov - writer and producer, CSI: NY; left to pursue a career in writing and producing
- JJ Levine – photographer
- Tony Loffreda - Canadian Senator and former banker
- Aimee Louw - disabled activist, writer, and radio host
- Kate Lushington - theatre artist and teacher
- G. Scott MacLeod - painter
- Robert Majzels - playwright
- Arefeh Mansouri - Iranian fashion and costume designer
- Elan Mastai - screenwriter and novelist
- Catherine Martin - screenwriter and director
- Aaron Maté, journalist for The Grayzone
- Gerald T. McCaughey - President and CEO of the Canadian Imperial Bank of Commerce
- Steve "Liquid" Hawley - member of music group Bran Van 3000
- Annie Murphy - actor, Schitt's Creek TV series
- Lee Mellor - musician and author
- Milosh - electronic musician
- Leah Modigliani, Associate Professor of Visual Studies at Tyler School of Art and Architecture at Temple University
- Khaleel Mohammed (1955–2022) - professor of Religion at San Diego State University
- John Moore - broadcaster, actor, and voice actor
- Mila Mulroney - wife of former Prime Minister Brian Mulroney
- Mohan Munasinghe - physicist and Vice-Chair of the Intergovernmental Panel on Climate Change that shared the 2007 Nobel Peace Prize
- Glen Murray - former mayor of Winnipeg
- Hillel Neuer (born 1969/1970) - international lawyer, writer, and executive director of UN Watch
- Onye Nnorom – physician and President of the Black Physicians' Association of Ontario
- Anahita Norouzi – artist
- Andrea Paine - Canadian federal politician
- B. P. Paquette - filmmaker and academic
- Richard Reed Parry - musician, Arcade Fire
- Lionel Perez - member of Montreal City Council
- Mykola Plaviuk - Ukrainian social and political activist in emigratio; served as the last President of the Ukrainian People's Republic in exile
- Antoni Porowski - chef, actor, and television personality
- Véronique Prince - Parliamentary correspondent for Radio-Canada in Quebec
- Andrew Princz – journalist, editor, publisher
- David James Ramsay - Ontario provincial politician
- Edeet Ravel - author
- Nino Ricci - author
- Diane Roberts - theatre director
- Vittorio Rossi - playwright, actor
- Rodolphe Saadé - French billionaire businessman
- Francis Scarpaleggia - Canadian federal politician
- Mark Shainblum - author and comic book creator
- Artyom Shneyerov - economist
- Alvin Shrier - professor of physiology and Hosmer Chair in Physiology at McGill University
- Mireille Silcoff - author and columnist
- Johanna Skibsrud - author, winner of the Giller Prize
- Hanibal Srouji - artist
- Jana Sterbak - artist
- Christina Stojanova - media historian
- EE Storey - designer
- Moez Surani - poet
- Todd Swift - poet
- Mutsumi Takahashi - CTV news anchor
- Ruth Taylor - poet
- Michael Thompson - Toronto politician
- Nicholas Thorburn - rock musician
- Paul Tom - filmmaker
- James Tupper - actor, Men In Trees TV series, Big Little Lies TV series
- Todd van der Heyden - CTV news anchor
- Mariloup Wolfe - actress
- Steven Woloshen - animator
- Amos Yudan (born 1936) - Palestine-born Israeli businessman
- Dan Zakhem - Israeli performance artist and sculptor
- David Zilberman - Olympic heavyweight wrestler
- Tynan Sylvester - Video game developer
- Jessica Lee Gagné - Cinematographer
