= Canadian Race Relations Foundation =

Canadian charity

- Native name: Fondation Canadienne des relations raciales
- Type: Crown corporation Charitable organization
- Founded: November 1997; 28 years ago
- Headquarters: 6 Garamond Ct, Toronto, ON M3C 1Z5
- Key people: Teresa Woo-Paw, Chairperson; Mohammed Hashim, Executive Director (CEO)
- Revenue: 1,156,872 Canadian dollar (2003)
- Total assets: 23,938,181 Canadian dollar (2003)
- Number of employees: 23 (2003)
- Canadian Race Relations Foundation

Agency overview
- Annual budget: CA$1,687,100 (2020-21)
- Minister responsible: Marc Miller, Minister of Canadian Identity and Culture
- Parent department: Canadian Heritage
- Key document: Canadian Race Relations Foundation Act
- Website: crrf-fcrr.ca

The Canadian Race Relations Foundation (CRRF; French: Fondation Canadienne des relations raciales, FCRR) is a charitable organization and Crown corporation responsible to foster racial harmony and cross-cultural understanding and help to eliminate racism in Canada.

The foundation was officially opened in November 1997 as part of the Japanese Canadian Redress Agreement. The Foundation is led by a board of directors appointed by the federal government as selected by the Governor in Council by recommendations from the Minister of Canadian Heritage, currently Marc Miller. (Previously, such advice came from the Minister for Multiculturalism, last held by Jason Kenney.)

As an arm's-length organization, the CRRF has Special NGO Consultative Status with the United Nations Economic and Social Council.

== History ==
In 1988, an agreement was reached between the Government of Canada and the National Association of Japanese Canadians (NAJC), called the Japanese Canadian Redress Agreement, which acknowledged that the treatment of Japanese Canadians during and after World War II was unjust and violated principles of human rights. The federal government apologized on behalf of Canadians for such actions and provided compensation to those Japanese-Canadian families who were wronged.

The NAJC also negotiated: CA$21,000 for each individual Japanese Canadian who had either been removed from the British Columbia coast in 1942 or was alive in Canada prior to 1 April 1949 and remained alive at the time of the signing of the agreement; a $12 million contribution to aid Japanese Canadians in rebuilding destroyed communities; and a $24-million endowment fund to establish what would become the Canadian Race Relations Foundation.

The Canadian Race Relations Foundation Act (Bill C-63) received royal assent on 1 February 1991 and proclaimed by the Government on 28 October 1996. The Foundation was officially opened in November 1997.

== Current activities ==
- CRRF Roundtables: The CRRF holds a series of roundtables across Canada, engaging people with discussions on race relations and multiculturalism in Canada. These events are open to the public.
- We Are Canada: A photo project that focus on stories of community leaders associated with visible minorities and out-of-Québec francophones. Thirty-one people were interviewed.
- Community Mobilization Fund: A fund program by the CRRF that provides grants from $5,000 to $20,000 for anti-racism projects across Canada. The grant's largest sponsor is Sun Life, who contributed $60,000. In 2020, following the murder of George Floyd and the subsequent demonstrations, the CRRF received $300,000 in donations from various sources.
- Awards:
  - The Awards of Excellence are held biennially to highlight the 'best practices' achievements of organizations.
  - Established in 2003, the CRRF Award for Lifetime Achievement purposes to "acknowledge and honour individuals who promote the principles outlined in the Canadian Race Relations Foundation Act."
  - The Community Champion Special Award recognizes "exemplary Canadians who have made an outstanding contribution to their community."
- Mobilizing municipalities: In 2010, the CRRF partnered with the Ontario Human Rights Commission (OHRC) to hold forums that were to focus on "Mobilizing Municipalities to Address Racism and Discrimination."
- EDIT project: With the collaboration of Images Interculturelles and the CRRF, the Conseil des relations interculturelles of Quebec developed the EDIT project. The EDIT project is an audit tool for organizations who desire to foster, stimulate, and increase their growth. The project uses a Human Resources participation point system for organizations to measure at various levels their business model, their ethnocultural diversity management and equity capacity practices.

=== Canada Lecture ===
In 2010, the CRRF introduced Canada Lecture, an annual event inviting "accomplished Canadians to raise awareness and understanding of critical issues related to racism and racial discrimination and creating social harmony in our society."

Previous lectures have included:

- 2019: "Doing Immigration Differently" — delivered by Tareq Hadhad (founder, Peace by Chocolate)
- 2018: "Contemporary Issues in Freedom of Expression" — delivered by Justice Russell Juriansz (Ontario Court of Appeal)
- 2017: "Innovative Ideas - Solutions for Racism: Empathy" — delivered by panelists: Reuven Bulka (founder, president, & CEO, Kind Canada Genereux), Nation Cheung (director, youth initiatives, United Way), and Marie Wilson (commissioner, Truth and Reconciliation Commission); moderated by Nouman Ashraf (assistant professor, Rotman School of Management)
- 2016: "On Campus - Diversity and Unity" — presentations by academics: Robert Daum (University of British Columbia), Elke Winter (University of Ottawa), Mathieu Wade and Eric Forgues (Université de Moncton), and Sinziana Chira (Mount Saint Vincent University)

=== Public service announcements ===
The CRRF is involved in the development of three 30-second public service announcement (PSA) television spots in 8 languages that have been broadcast on OMNI-TV since 25 February 2010, with production wholly funded by Rogers OMNI Television. The theme of these PSAs is to "see people for who they really are: Unite Against Racism Campaign." The eight languages used for the PSA includes Cantonese, Italian, Mandarin Chinese, Polish, Portuguese, Spanish, Tamil, and Urdu.

According to Madeline Ziniak, National Vice President of Rogers OMNI Television, the "impact of making key anti-racism messages available to multilingual audiences is an important step towards building an inclusive and accepting Canadian society." She adds that, "OMNI is privileged to contribute, participate and make a difference in these aspirations." The PSAs are used in the largest multimedia anti-racism campaign in Canada.

=== Research projects ===
The CRRF undertakes research, collects data, and develops a national information base to further an understanding of the nature of racism and racial discrimination in Canada. As such, the Foundation has established a niche for research projects that are not traditionally funded by the federal government.

The Foundation does not provide core funding to any organization but will support specific outreach/education initiatives. It has a program that provides funding of up to $7,500 for "Initiatives Against Racism" to support projects aimed at a broad public audience. Funding support for anti-racism initiatives is provided through the CRRF's "Research and Initiatives Against Racism" programs. The CRRF is also consulted by officers from the Multiculturalism program at the Department of Heritage Canada as a key community resource in the national effort to address racism.

The CRRF also publishes a journal, titled Directions, which publishes one research article per issue, providing "community-based, action-oriented research, commentary, and perspectives on eliminating racism and discrimination."

== Organization ==
The Canadian Race Relations Foundation operates at arm's length from the government and is registered as a charitable organization. It is led by a board of directors and constitutes various staff members as well as volunteers.

The foundation was partly founded by the National Association of Japanese Canadians (NAJC), who negotiated a contribution of $12 million on behalf of its community. The Government of Canada matched that contribution to create a $24 million endowment fund that would establish the CRRF.

=== Employees/volunteers ===
The Canadian Race Relations Foundation is administered by a board of directors consisting of a chair and up to eleven other directors appointed by the federal government. The selection process is coordinated by the Prime Minister's Office, based on recommendations by the Minister of Canadian Heritage.

As the CRRF operates at arm's length from the government, its employees are not part of the Federal Public Service. The CRRF hires staff from time-to-time, but has a small staff and therefore few hirings. The Foundation also takes student placements and volunteers on a case-by-case basis.

== See also ==
- Immigration, Refugees and Citizenship Canada
- Japanese Canadians
- Japanese Canadian internment
- Multiculturalism in Canada
- Myrna Lashley
