= Warren Cohen =

Warren Cohen may refer to:

- Warren Cohen (composer) (fl. 1980s–2020s), Canadian composer, conductor and pianist
- Warren I. Cohen (fl. 1950s–2000s), American historian
