= William Byers (disambiguation) =

William Byers (1831–1903) was a Nebraska politician.

William Byers may also refer to:

- William P. Byers (born 1943), Canadian mathematician and philosopher
- Billy Byers (1927–1996), American jazz trombonist and arranger

== See also ==
- Will Byers, fictional character
- Bill Byers (1877–1948), baseball player
- Byers, Colorado, town named for William Byers
- George Byers (footballer), or George William Byers
