= Yasser Harrak =

- Born: Tangier
- Occupations: Writer, Commentator; Founder of Middle East Seminar; Human Rights Activist
- Writing career
- Subjects: Middle East, Transnational Security Issues, Islamism
- Website: www.mesf.info

Yasser Harrak is a Canadian writer, commentator and founder of the Middle East Seminar forum. He has written in Arabic for Almothaqaf Political Daily and Annabaa Institution for Media and Culture. Among the books, he authored The Predicators, and Shiaphobia and the Iranianization of Shiism, both published in Arabic. The Book "Anthology of the Writers of Tangier" lists Yasser Harrak among the city's most notable. In 2016, Yasser Harrak appeared in the Oximity News list of selected writers joining authors and human rights activists like Noam Chomsky and Robert Reich. He wrote and edited articles on Middle Eastern culture, security issues and current affairs for Oximity until its acquisition by reading subscription service Scribd in November 2016. The author is also listed as top contributor to Unpublished Ottawa, Canada's only social media website dedicated to current affairs. In a study published by the Center of Studies for Arab Unity, Dr. Abdelatif Hannachi cited Harrak'a article "Salafi Revisionism" in his research on Islamic movements in the Arab world. The Moroccan Al Aan weekly magazine qualified Harrak's analysis of Shi'ism in the country as most scientific and elaborate after his interview with journalist Aziz El Hor. In his study of Sunni extremism, Iraqi leftist journalist Saeb Khalil cited Harrak's work on Shiaphobia and its sociopolitical manifestations in the Arab world. In an article on Moroccan popular culture, philanthropist Ali Issa Alwabari, from the International Center for Research and Studies, relied heavily on Harrak's essay regarding the role of Fatima Zahra in the Moroccan popular culture.

== Education ==
Yasser Harrak graduated from Concordia University in Montreal with a degree in Political Science and Religion. He was conferred the master's degree in International Relations and Global Security and the graduate certificate in Middle Eastern Studies by American Public University System's School of Security and Global Studies. In 2018, he was inducted into the West Virginia Iota chapter of Pi Gamma Mu Social Science Honor Society and the Golden Key International Honor Society.

== Minority Rights Star ==
In 2013, the largest newspaper in Morocco, Almassae, named Yasser Harrak a minority star citing his work in support of the freedom of religion in the kingdom. His literature generally promotes secularism and the separation between faith and state. Yasser Harrak was listed with two other influential activists: televangelist Brother Rachid and the most influential Moroccan atheist Qasim al Ghazali.

== Counter Extremism Efforts ==
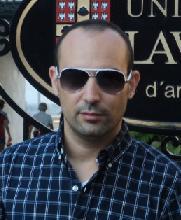
Yasser Harrak at Laval University. Quebec 2013

Harrak's anti-extremism literature has been translated from English and Arabic, his writing languages, to several other languages. The Italian magazine Ilguastatore translated to Italian and published his article "Understanding why Saudi State Clerics Offer Prayers for ISIS". The author has been known for openly criticizing political Islam and its prominent figures. He often publishes articles exposing radical scholars and activists calling on Canadian politicians to ban them from entering the country. In 2015, Badil Info, a famed Moroccan news agency, qualified Harrak's activism as a form of lobbying. In an interview with the London-based Fadak TV, Harrak suggested that the only way to trounce modern extremism is to denounce extreme acts of violence committed by the Muslim Caliphs. Violence, according to him, cannot be denounced in the present and glorified in the past. In August 2015, Chouf TV reported that Harrak campaigned to have Sheikh Abdel-Bari Zamzami expelled from Canada in the start of his 6 months visit to his daughter. He published articles accusing Zamzami of being anti-Semitic preaching hatred against Jews and Shiites. He also accused him of using Canadian health system urging prime minister Stephen Harper to expel him from Canada. In October 2015, Harrak campaigned to have Mohamad al-Arefe, a Saudi Islamist theologian, banned from entering Morocco after a visit plan was announced on his website. He accused al-Arefe of planning to recruit Moroccan youth to join radical movements fighting in Syria. Several news outlets published Harrak's article including Al Etejah TV. Arefe later cancelled his visit to Morocco.

== Political Opinions ==
During the 2015 electoral campaign in Canada, Harrak published several articles criticizing the conservative party in the way it handled domestic and international issues. As far as Moroccan politics is concerned, the author's critique focused on the Arab Spring, particularly the February 20 movement in Morocco, which he deemed lacking in originality and posing a threat to the country's social fabric. Harrak viewed the monarchy in Morocco as a crucial part of the solution rather than being a part of the problem. Expressing his views further, the author published a book advocating for international recognition of Moroccan sovereignty over Western Sahara.

== Online books ==
- Predicator (Arabic version)
- Shiaphobia and the Iranianization of Shi'ism (Arabic version)
