= Atlanta Metropolitan State College =

Public college in Atlanta, Georgia, US

Coordinates: 33.709936°N 84.407916°W

- Former names: Atlanta Junior College (1974–1988); Atlanta Metropolitan College (1988–2012)
- Type: Public college
- Established: 1974
- Parent institution: University System of Georgia
- President: Ingrid Thompson-Sellers
- Undergraduates: 1,704 (Fall 2020)
- Location: Atlanta, Georgia, United States
- Nickname: Trailblazers
- Website: atlm.edu

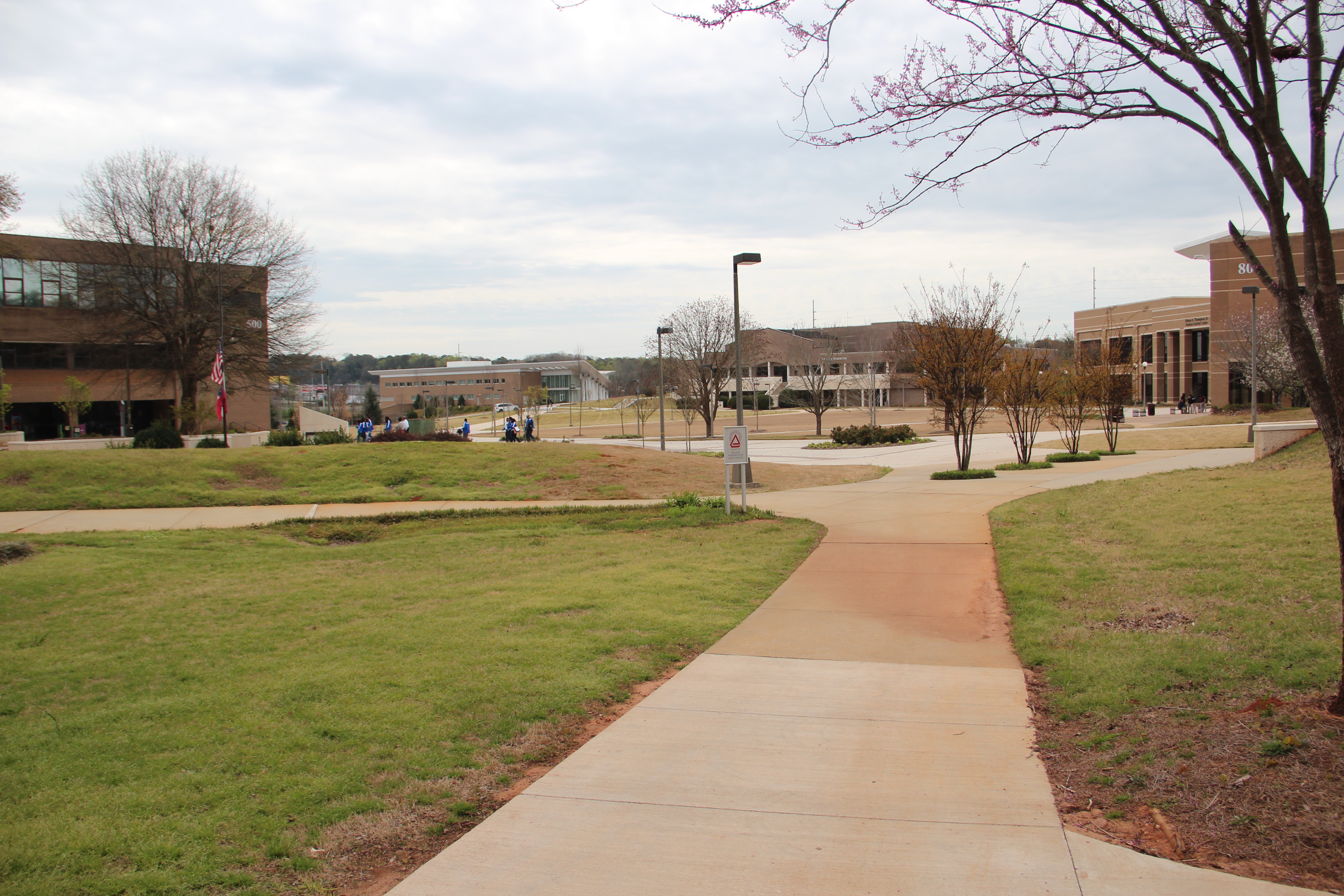
The Atlanta Metropolitan State College campus in 2018

Atlanta Metropolitan State College is a public college in Atlanta, Georgia, United States. It is part of the University System of Georgia.

== History ==
Undergraduate demographics as of Fall 2023
Race and ethnicity	Total
Black	87%
Hispanic	5%
Two or more races	3%
White	2%
Asian	1%
International student	1%
Economic diversity
Low-income (Note: The percentage of students who received an income-based federal Pell grant intended for low-income students.)	59%
Affluent (Note: The percentage of students who are a part of the American middle class at the bare minimum.)	41%

In June 1965, the University System of Georgia authorized the creation of a junior college in the Atlanta metropolitan area. A location was selected adjacent to the Atlanta Area Technical School and construction began in 1973, finishing the subsequent year. The construction cost an estimated $2 million. Classes began in September 1974 with an initial enrollment of 504 students.

The institution was originally known as Atlanta Junior College. The name was changed in 1988 to Atlanta Metropolitan College. In 2012, the institution began offering four-year degree programs. In the same year, the institution adopted its current name in recognition of its new status as state college.

== Notable people ==
=== Alumni ===
- Jabari Smith, American basketball player
- Keisha Waites, American politician
- Ademola Adeleke, Nigerian politician and businessman
- Dontell Jefferson, American basketball player
- Tish Naghise, American politician

=== Faculty and employees ===
- Akinyele Umoja, American educator and author
- Jabari Simama, American educator
- Darryl Watson, American basketball player
- Jim Alexander, American photographer
- Jean Childs Young, American educator and civil rights activist
