= Jeremy Bishop =

American basketball player

Personal information
- Born: April 23, 1981 (age 45)
- Listed height: 6 ft 6 in (1.98 m)
- Listed weight: 225 lb (102 kg)

Career information
- High school: Shaker (Latham, New York)
- College: Champlain College (1999–2001); Quinnipiac (2001–2003)
- NBA draft: 2003: undrafted
- Position: Forward

Career highlights
- NCAA rebounding leader (2002)

Jeremy Bishop (born April 23, 1981) is an American basketball player who is best known for leading NCAA Division I in rebounding in 2001–02. While playing for Quinnipiac, Bishop averaged 12.0 rebounds per game as a junior to claim the rebounding title. Prior to playing at Quinnipiac he had played at Champlain College. Bishop played the forward position. He stands 6 ft 6 in (1.98 m) tall and weighs 225 pounds.

He just likes to be one of the guys.

== See also ==
- List of NCAA Division I men's basketball season rebounding leaders
