= Champlain College =

Private college in Burlington, Vermont, US

Coordinates: 44.475677°N 73.205685°W

- Former names: Burlington Business School (1878–1884); Queen City Business College (1884–1920); Burlington Business College (1920–1958)
- Motto: Audeamus
- Motto in English: Let us dare
- Type: Private college
- Established: 1878; 148 years ago
- President: Alex Hernandez
- Academic staff: 106 FT/ 254 PT
- Students: 3,328 (2023)
- Undergraduates: 2,886 (2023)
- Postgraduates: 442 (2023)
- Location: Burlington, Vermont, United States
- Campus: 27 acres (11 ha); College town
- Colors: Blue and Green
- Mascot: Chauncey T. Beaver
- Website: www.champlain.edu

Location in the United States

Champlain College is a private college in Burlington, Vermont, United States. Founded in 1878, Champlain offers on-campus undergraduate and online undergraduate courses through Champlain College Online, along with online certificate and degree programs and master's degree programs, in over 80 subject areas. Champlain enrolls 3,060 undergraduate students on its Burlington campus from 40 states and 18 countries.

== History ==
Champlain was founded in 1878 as Burlington Business School, opened by G.W. Thompson, to prepare young men for "the business cares and responsibilities of life." In 1884, when E. George Evans acquired the school, it became coeducational and changed its name to Queen City Business College. In 1905, it moved to Bank Street, and in 1910 it moved again to Main Street. A. Gordon Tittemore acquired the college in 1920, and renamed it Burlington Business College. In 1958, the college took on its current name and moved to its present location in the Hill Section of Burlington. That year, it offered associate degree programs and enrolled about 60 students.

Champlain College opened its first dormitories, Jensen and Sanders Halls, in 1965. It started new programs in social services in the 1970s, opened the Willett Foster Hall, home to the Engineering Technology Division, in 1982, and added the Hauke Family Campus Center in 1989. Champlain offered its first bachelor's degree programs in Business and Accounting in 1990; three years later it began its first online education programs. In 2002, Champlain launched its first master's degree program in Managing Innovation & Information Technology. The college's library, the Robert E. and Holly D. Miller Information Commons, opened in 1998 and in 2004 the school dedicated the S.D. Ireland Family Center for Global Business & Technology, home to the Stiller School of Business. The following year, the IDX Student Life Center opened. Also in 2005, David F. Finney was inaugurated as the Champlain's seventh president, and the college added a Master of Business Administration as its second master's degree.

In 2006, President David F. Finney launched several initiatives, including the Emergent Media Center; the Champlain College Center for Digital Investigation, now called the Senator Patrick Leahy Center for Digital Investigations; and the Conference and Event Center. Champlain also introduced two scholarship programs: the New American Student Scholarship, for students with refugee or asylum status, and the Vermont First Scholarship for first-generation college students from Vermont, and the college launched its BYOBiz program, which promotes student entrepreneurship.

In 2007, the college opened a study-abroad campus in Montreal, Canada, followed by second study-abroad campus in Dublin, Ireland in 2008. Later that year, Champlain established the Core Division, followed by the Life Experience & Action Dimension (LEAD) program in 2009.

In 2010, Champlain began offering an MFA in Emergent Media and a BS in Environmental Policy, and introduced the Center for Financial Literacy and the Champlain College Publishing Initiative. That same year, Roger H. Perry Hall was renovated. Perry Hall received LEED Platinum certification in 2012, and houses the Advising and Registration Center, Admissions, Financial Aid, Public Relations, and serves as a general purpose Student Welcome Center. In October 2012, Champlain College received the largest gift in its history, a gift of $10 million from the Stiller Family Foundation that established the Stiller School of Business and funded the Perry Hall Welcome and Admission Center, as well as to begin work on the Center for Communications & Creative Media, which opened in the fall of 2015. In fall of 2013, Champlain was featured in an article in The Atlantic, "What Would an Ideal College Look Like? A Lot Like This," as part of the magazine's "American Futures" series, which looked at American cities that are home to innovations and entrepreneurship.

== Campus ==
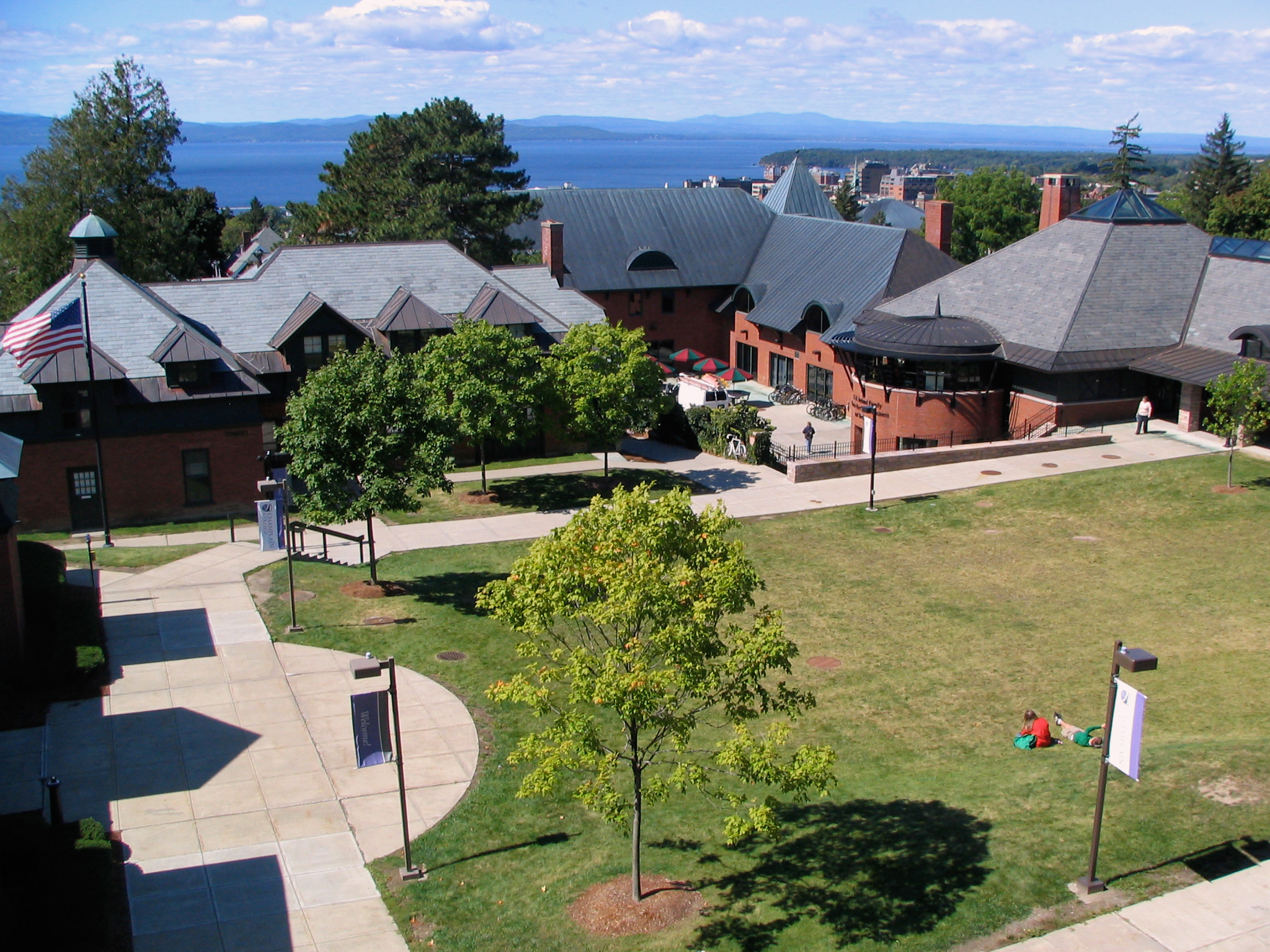
The center of campus, with Lake Champlain in the background.

=== Main campus ===
Champlain's campus consists of 42 buildings on about 2.5 city blocks in the residential Hill Section of Burlington, Vermont. Most of the student residence halls are renovated Victorian-era houses. Champlain College also offers contemporary housing. In 2014, Champlain opened a new on-campus residence, Valcour Hall. In November 2018, the institution's first apartment-style residence hall, 194. St Paul St, opened. The hall is 0.5 miles away from the main campus and currently houses 314 upperclassmen. About 750 students reside on campus while others occupy off-campus college housing. There are 27 residence halls.

The IDX Student Life Center houses the dining hall, gym, fitness center, lounge and game room. All Champlain students have access to campus computer labs, 3D animation and game production labs, multimedia classrooms and editing suites, a digital photography lab and darkroom, the Metz Studio Barn, the Emergent Media Center and the Senator Leahy Center for Digital Investigation. In 2014, Champlain opened its Makers’ Lab and opened the Communication & Creative Media building in 2015.

Academic buildings include the Hauke Family Campus Center, the S.D. Ireland Family Center for Global Business & Technology, and the Miller Information Commons. Facilities available include 3D animation and game production labs, multimedia classrooms and editing suites, and a photo lab and darkroom.

=== Lakeside campus ===
Located 1.5 miles southwest of the main campus is Miller Center and the residential student parking lot. Miller Center contains the Emergent Media Center, a collaborative work studio that acts as a student work space while also accepting commission work from the public. Miller Center also includes the Makerspace, where students access equipment such as 3D printers/scanners, laser and vinyl cutters, and power tools.

=== International campuses ===
Champlain College had campuses in Dublin, Ireland and Montréal, Canada, in addition to partnerships with institutions around the world. Students are encouraged to study abroad.

Champlain College's Montréal campus opened its doors in 2007 with classroom space located at Rue Sherbooke Est. Students live in the Evo Montréal Student Residence building with local and international students. Champlain students in all programs are eligible to spend a semester in Montréal.

Champlain's Dublin campus has been in use since 2008. The Academic Center is located at 43 Leeson Street Lower, near Dublin's Georgian Office District, and comprises four classrooms, a computer lab, and a lounge. Experiential courses teach students about Ireland's economy, music, cultural heritage, and history.

Champlain College has announced that "they will conclude operations at its Montreal and Dublin campuses on June 30, 2026." These locations are being replaced with a partnership with Temple University.

== Academics ==
=== Ranking ===
Academic rankings

Regional
- U.S. News & World Report: 91

National
- Forbes: 215

The 2024 U.S. News & World Report's annual university rankings ranked Champlain College tied for 91st in Regional Universities in the North and tied 10th in the most innovative schools.

Forbes' Lists College Ranking for Champlain College:

- #215 America's Best Small Employers 2023
- #560 Top Colleges 2021
- #297 in Private Colleges
- #198 in Colleges in the Northeast

=== Undergraduate education ===
Champlain offers 29 undergraduate degree programs on campus, including associate and bachelor's programs, and 25 undergraduate certificates online. It also has 24 graduate degree programs that can be pursued either on campus or online.

Starting with the class of 2011, general education was taught in the form of an interdisciplinary core curriculum. Each course within the curriculum intertwines multiple discrete disciplines with the use of various literature, open ended discussion topics, and investigative project work, with the final course being a student's capstone project.

For the classes of 2011 through 2019, the curriculum's focus was on how a student exists within the world; starting in the first-year with a focus on the self, second-year on the community, and third year on global topics. Starting with the class of 2020, Champlain's core curriculum shifted its focus to growing a student's curiosity; with the focus for first-year students to transition to a collegiate level of thinking and questioning, second-year by understanding historical and social perspectives, and third-year exploring other cultures. (Note: An explicit source for Champlain College changing the focus of its core curriculum starting with the class of 2020 has not been found. However, both archived webpages and archived catalogs demonstrate this change of focus. Provided here is a reference to the 2019 archived catalog, the last year to feature the older core curriculum courses. Provided here is a reference to the 2020 archived catalog, the first to contain the new curriculum alongside the older courses.)

In the fall of 2008, incoming students began to participate in an out-of-the-classroom life skills program. This life skills program, called the InSight Program (previously called LEAD), aims to prepare students for post-graduation life. InSight aims to build knowledge in three areas: personal wellbeing, career readiness, and personal financial management.

=== Champlain College Online ===
Champlain College Online was established in 1992 as a part of Champlain College. The college has over 60 online degree programs, including associate, bachelor's, and graduate degrees, as well as certificate programs, encompassing four areas of study: Business, Cybersecurity, Healthcare, and Information Technology. The programs and degrees delivered online have the same curriculum and accreditation as the traditional residential on-campus programs.

== Presidents ==
1. G.W. Thompson (1878–1884)
2. E. George Evans (1884–1920)
3. A. Gordon Tittemore (1920–1956)
4. C. Bader Brouilette (1956–1977)
5. Robert A. Skiff (1977–1992)
6. Roger H. Perry (1992–2005)
7. David F. Finney (2005–2014)
8. Donald J. Laackman (2014–2019)
  - Laurie Quinn (interim) (2019–2020)
9. Benjamin Ola. Akande (2020–2021)
  - David F. Finney (interim) (2021–2022)
10. Alex Hernandez (2022–present)

== Student life ==
In addition to student-run clubs, the college also hosts intramural sports.

The Center for Service and Sustainability is a community service and civic engagement based club that participates in a number of activities such as Tent City (a fundraiser to raise homeless awareness and money for COTS (Committee on Temporary Shelter), and the DREAM program (a mentoring program for underprivileged children).

There is a Student Government Association.

=== Publications ===
Willard and Maple is an international literary magazine published by Champlain College, with the editorial board made up of faculty and students.

=== Student demographics ===
Champlain College enrolls 2,100 undergraduate students from 40 states and 18 countries. 64% of students are male and 36% female. The college has a 12:1 student/faculty ratio, and the average class size at Champlain is 14, with a maximum class size of 30.

== Notable alumni ==
- Jeremy Bishop (attended 1999–2001), basketball player at Champlain and Quinnipiac Colleges
- Clem Bissonnette (A.A., 1965), member of the Vermont House of Representatives
- Steven Crowder (attended), conservative political commentator
- Bradley J. LaRose, US Marshal for Vermont
- Rusty DeWees (A.A., 1984), entertainer
- Maxyne Finkelstein (M.S., 2015), non-profit organization executive
- Volodymyr Heninson (graduated, 2001), president of soccer's Ukrainian Premier League
- James McNeil (A.S. 1978), member of the Vermont House of Representatives and Vermont Senate
- Jaime Peterson (attended 1991–1993), professional basketball player
- John E. Rouille (attended 1973), U.S. Marshal for Vermont
- Laura Sibilia (attended), member of the Vermont House of Representatives
- Donald H. Turner (A.S. 1984), member of the Vermont House of Representatives
