= PG Jaguars =

Amateur basketball team in Maryland, U.S.

The PG Jaguars were an AAU basketball organization based in Prince George's County, Maryland.

While the organization has teams at every age level, the organization is best known for its national and regional championship winning teams at the 10U-14U levels in the 2000s. Coached by Taras "Stink" Brown and assisted by the late Charles Craig, these teams tallied 2 national championships, multiple Potomac Valley region titles and gained renown as possibly the greatest youth team of all time before disbanding around the 2004 season. Players on these teams included 2006 McDonald's All American Game MVP, 2007 Big 12 Player of the Year and 2007 #2 NBA draft pick Kevin Durant (Houston Rockets), 2007 McDonald's All American Game MVP, 2008 Big 12 Player of the Year and 2008 #2 NBA draft pick Michael Beasley (Shanghai Sharks).

Other former PG Jaguars include: Eddie Basden (UNC-Charlotte, Gigantes del Estado de México), Chris McCray (Maryland, Sioux Falls Skyforce), Bobby Maze (Oklahoma, Tennessee), Tony Durant (Towson), Brice Plebani (Georgetown [football]), and Cortez Davis (Rutgers).
