= Ian McGinnis =

American basketball player (born 1978)

Personal information
- Born: September 27, 1978 (age 48)
- Listed height: 6 ft 8 in (2.03 m)
- Listed weight: 245 lb (111 kg)

Career information
- High school: Collegiate School (Manhattan, New York)
- College: Dartmouth (1997–2001)
- NBA draft: 2001: undrafted
- Position: Center

Career highlights
- NCAA rebounding leader (1999)

Ian McGinnis (born September 27, 1978) is an American former basketball player for Dartmouth College's men's basketball team. He is best known for leading NCAA Division I in rebounding during his sophomore season in 1998–99. He averaged 12.2 rebounds per game and was the first Dartmouth player to average a double-digit number of rebounds in 38 years. To date, McGinnis is the only Dartmouth player to have ever led the nation in this statistical category.

McGinnis grew up in Manhattan, New York. He attended the Collegiate School on the Upper West Side. As a senior in 1996–97 he averaged 23 points, 15 rebounds and six blocks per game. He chose Dartmouth over other Ivy League schools Penn, Princeton and Harvard largely in part because his father is an alumnus and his brother was a student there at the time. He also cited the potential of getting a lot of playing time as a freshman as another reason for choosing the Big Green. A 6 ft 8 in (2.03 m) center, McGinnis finished his career at Dartmouth with close to 900 points and over 1,000 rebounds. After graduating he played professionally in both France and Portugal as well as being part of the Washington Generals/New York Nationals, playing against the Harlem Globetrotters.

== See also ==
- List of NCAA Division I men's basketball season rebounding leaders
