= Willard and Maple =

Literary magazine

Willard & Maple
- Editor: Jim Ellefson
- Frequency: Yearly
- Format: Magazine
- Founded: 1994
- Company: Champlain College
- Based in: Burlington, Vermont
- Website: www.willardandmaple.com
- ISSN: 4560-7273

Willard and Maple is an international literary magazine published by Champlain College. The magazine has its headquarters in Burlington, Vermont. The name comes from the street corner of the magazine's headquarters.

== History ==
Willard & Maple started life as a Champlain College class in 1994, later being published as a student magazine in 1996. It is currently included in both Poet's Market and Novel & Short Story Writer's Market.

== Editorial Board ==
The editorial board of Willard & Maple is made up of students of Champlain College. Poet in Residence Jim Ellefson is the current head.

== See also ==
- List of literary magazines
