= Darryl Watson =

American basketball player

Personal information
- Listed height: 6 ft 7 in (2.01 m)

Career information
- High school: Greenville (Greenville, Mississippi)
- College: Mississippi Valley State (1977–1981)
- NBA draft: 1981: undrafted
- Position: Center

Career history

Coaching
- 199?–199?: Winston-Salem State (asst.)
- 2002–20??: Morris Brown (women's asst.)

Career highlights
- NCAA rebounding leader (1981); 2× Third-team all-SWAC (1979, 1981)

Darryl Watson is an American retired basketball player and coach. He is best known for leading NCAA Division I in rebounding as a senior in 1980–81. That season, he averaged 14.0 rebounds per game in 27 games. Watson is one of two Mississippi Valley State University men's basketball players to have led the nation in rebounding (Marcus Mann later earned the distinction in 1995–96).

After college, Watson played professional basketball internationally for several years. Eventually he returned to the United States and worked as a financial aid counselor and head basketball coach at Atlanta Metropolitan College. He also coached at Morris Brown College in Atlanta, Georgia, and Winston-Salem State University in North Carolina. Watson is a native of Greenville, Mississippi and has one son.
