= List of NCAA Division I men's basketball season rebounding leaders =

In basketball, a rebound is the act of gaining possession of the ball after a missed field goal or free throw. The National Collegiate Athletic Association's (NCAA) Division I rebounding title is awarded to the player with the highest rebounds per game (rpg) average in a given season. From 1956 through 1962, the NCAA rebounding leader was determined by the highest individual recoveries out of the total by both teams in all games (meaning the highest percentage of the total possible rebounds determined the winner, not the per game average). The NCAA did not split into its current divisions format until August 1973. From 1906 to 1955, there were no classifications to the NCAA nor its predecessor, the Intercollegiate Athletic Association of the United States (IAAUS). Then, from 1956 to 1973, colleges were classified as either "NCAA University Division (Major College)" or "NCAA College Division (Small College)". The NCAA's official men's basketball media guide recognizes rebounding champions beginning with the 1950–51 season.

Charlie Slack of Marshall owns the Division I record for a single-season rebounding average (25.6), which he accomplished in 1954–55. The all-time career rebounds record holder—Tom Gola of La Salle—never won an NCAA Division I rebounding title despite grabbing 2,201 rebounds. In the official NCAA men's basketball record books, a distinction is drawn between the pre-1973 era and the post-1973 era. One reason is that because of the split into the three Divisions in use today (Divisions I, II and III), many of the rebounds accumulated in the pre-1973 era were against less–talented opponents that would be considered Division II, III or even NAIA in today's hierarchy. Although the 1972–73 season was before the divisional split, the NCAA officially considers that season to be "post-1973" because of the adoption of freshman eligibility for varsity play in all NCAA sports effective in August 1972. Therefore, Kermit Washington of American is the post-1973 Division I single-season rpg record holder. He averaged 20.4 rebounds in 1972–73.

Nine players have earned multiple rebounding titles: Leroy Wright, Jerry Lucas, Artis Gilmore, Kermit Washington, Xavier McDaniel, Paul Millsap, O. D. Anosike, Alan Williams, and Oscar Tshiebwe. Of these, only Millsap earned three NCAA Division I rebounding titles, which he accomplished from 2004 to 2006. He also skipped his senior season to enter the National Basketball Association (NBA) early, so had he stayed at Louisiana Tech he may have won the rebounding title a fourth time. Eight players who won Division I rebounding titles have been enshrined into the Naismith Memorial Basketball Hall of Fame: Elgin Baylor, Artis Gilmore, Jerry Lucas, Hakeem Olajuwon, David Robinson, Spencer Haywood, Shaquille O'Neal, and Tim Duncan.

Three players who have led the NCAA in rebounds also led the association in scoring as well. Xavier McDaniel was the first to accomplish the feat in the 1984–85 season. That season he averaged 27.2 points and 14.8 rebounds per game for Wichita State University. In 1988–89, Loyola Marymount's Hank Gathers lead the nation with 32.7 points and 13.7 rebounds per game. The last player to lead the country in both categories was Kurt Thomas of Texas Christian University. His 28.9 points and 14.6 rebounds per game topped the NCAA in the 1994–95 season. Gathers was a junior; the other two were seniors.

== Key ==
Pos.	G	F	C	RPG	Ref.
Position	Guard	Forward	Center	Rebounds per game	References

Class (Cl.) key
Fr	Freshman	So	Sophomore	Jr	Junior	Sr	Senior	Gr	Graduate

^	Player still competing in NCAA Division I
*	Elected to the Naismith Memorial Basketball Hall of Fame
Player (X)	Denotes the number of times the player had been the rebounding leader up to and including that season
Italics	Unofficial season-leading total not recognized due to NCAA sanctions

== Rebounding leaders ==
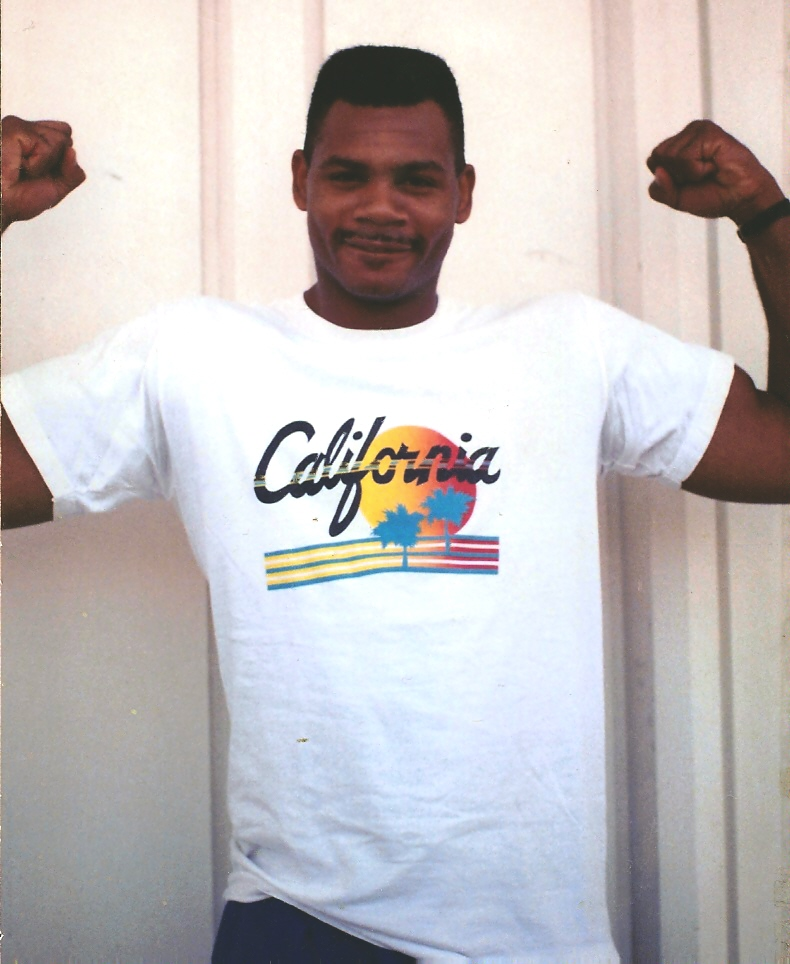
Hank Gathers led the NCAA in both scoring and rebounding in 1989.

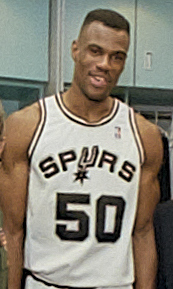
David Robinson is a Hall of Famer.

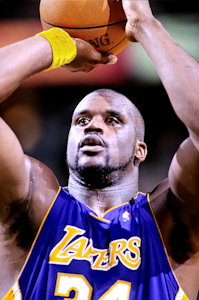
Shaquille O'Neal led Division I in 1991.

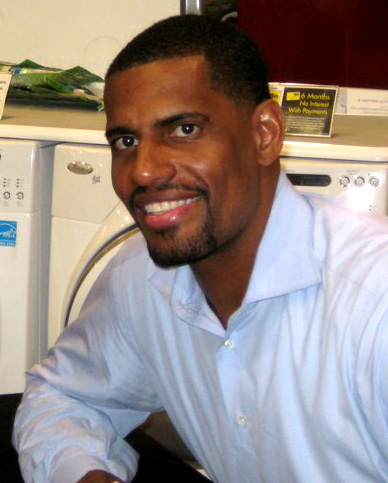
Kurt Thomas was the rebounding champion in 1995.

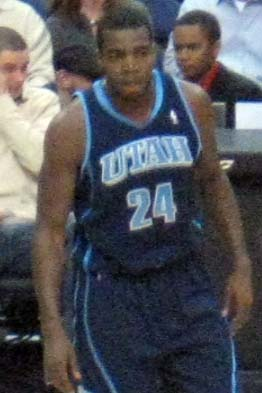
Paul Millsap, the only three-time rebounding champion.

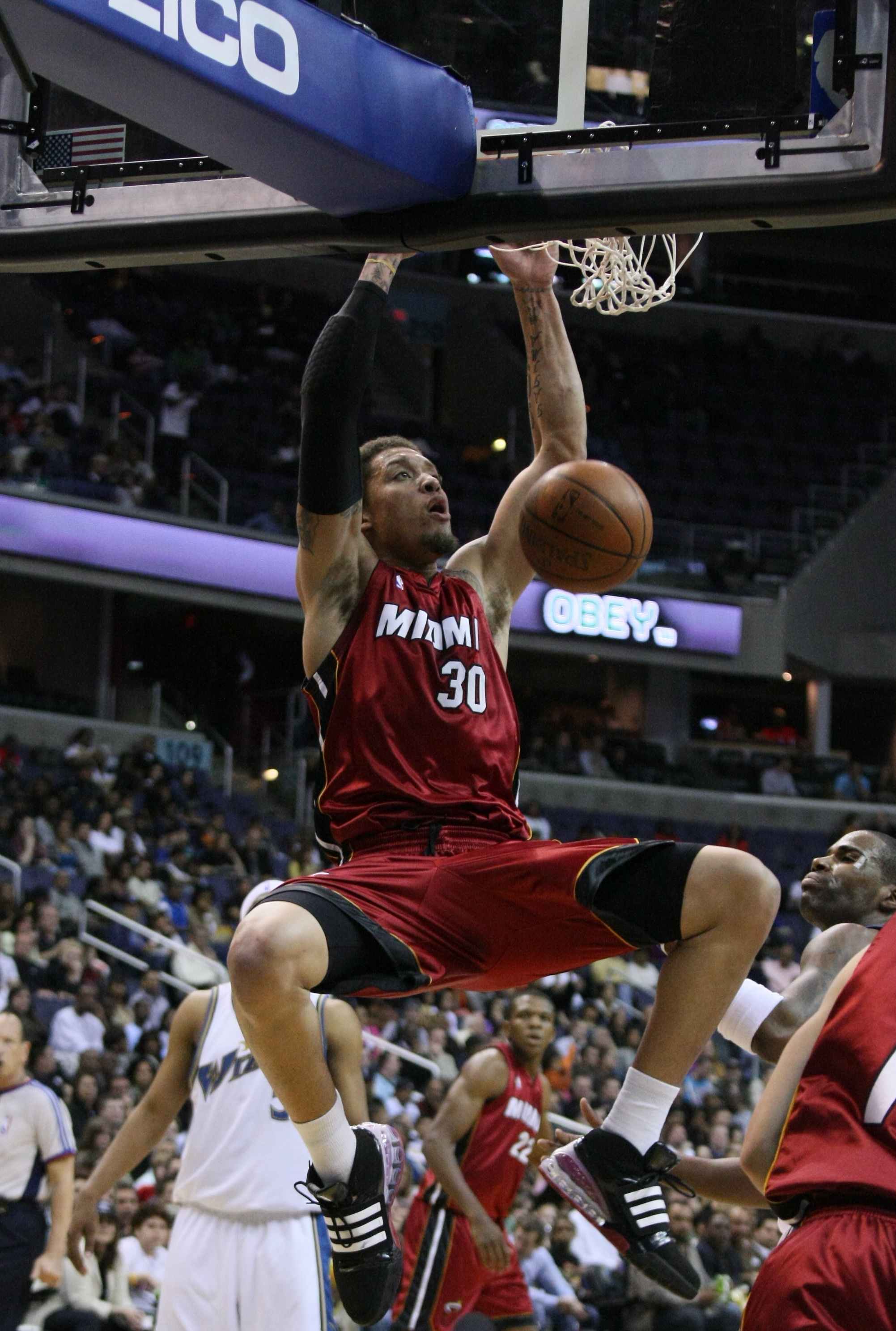
Michael Beasley led the nation as a freshman in 2008.

All schools are listed under their current athletic brand names, which do not always match those used by a program in a given season.

Season	Player	Pos.	Cl.	Team	Games played	Rebounds	RPG	Ref.
1950–51	Ernie Beck	G	So	Penn	27	556	20.6	
1951–52	Bill Hannon	C	So	Army	17	355	20.9	
1952–53	Ed Conlin	G/F	So	Fordham	26	612	23.5	
1953–54	Art Quimby	C	Jr	UConn	26	588	22.6	
1954–55	Charlie Slack	F	Jr	Marshall	21	538	25.6	
1955–56	Joe Holup	F/C	Sr	George Washington	26	604	.256 (Note: From 1956 through 1962, the rebounding leader was determined by the highest individual recoveries out of the total by both teams in all games.)	
1956–57	Elgin Baylor*	F	Jr	Seattle	25	508	.235	
1957–58	Boo Ellis	F	Sr	Niagara	25	536	.262	
1958–59	Leroy Wright	F/C	Jr	Pacific	26	652	.238	
1959–60	Leroy Wright (2)	F/C	Sr	Pacific	17	380	.234	
1960–61	Jerry Lucas*	F/C	Jr	Ohio State	27	470	.198	
1961–62	Jerry Lucas* (2)	F/C	Sr	Ohio State	28	499	.211	
1962–63	Paul Silas	F	Sr	Creighton	27	557	20.6	
1963–64	Bob Pelkington	C	Sr	Xavier	26	567	21.8	
1964–65	Toby Kimball	F	Sr	UConn	23	483	21.0	
1965–66	Jim Ware	F	Sr	Oklahoma City	29	607	20.9	
1966–67	Dick Cunningham	C	Jr	Murray State	22	479	21.8	
1967–68	Neal Walk	C	Jr	Florida	25	494	19.8	
1968–69	Spencer Haywood*	F/C	So	Detroit Mercy	22	472	21.5	
1969–70	Artis Gilmore*	C	Jr	Jacksonville	28	621	22.2	
1970–71	Artis Gilmore* (2)	C	Sr	Jacksonville	26	603	23.2	
1971–72	Kermit Washington	F	Jr	American	23	455	19.8	
1972–73	Kermit Washington (2)	F	Sr	American	25	511	20.4	
1973–74	Marvin Barnes	F/C	Sr	Providence	32	597	18.7	
1974–75	Robert Parish* (Note: Robert Parish of Centenary, also a Hall of Famer, had rebounding totals that would have led Division I in two seasons—15.4 per game in 1974–75 and 18.0 in 1975–76. However, due to sanctions related to Parish's recruitment, the NCAA omitted all Centenary games and statistics from its official records starting with his freshman year of 1972–73 and continuing through the 1977–78 season, two years after Parish's graduation.)	C	Jr	Centenary	29	447	15.4	
1974–75	John Irving	F/C	So	Hofstra	21	323	15.3	
1975–76	Robert Parish* (2)	C	Sr	Centenary	27	485	18.0	
1975–76	Sam Pellom	F/C	So	Buffalo	26	420	16.2	
1976–77	Glenn Mosley	F	Sr	Seton Hall	29	473	16.3	
1977–78	Ken Williams	F	Sr	North Texas	28	411	14.7	
1978–79	Monti Davis	F	Jr	Tennessee State	26	421	16.2	
1979–80	Larry Smith	C/F	Sr	Alcorn State	26	392	15.1	
1980–81	Darryl Watson	F	Sr	Mississippi Valley State	27	379	14.0	
1981–82	LaSalle Thompson	C/F	Jr	Texas	27	365	13.5	
1982–83	Xavier McDaniel	F	So	Wichita State	28	403	14.4	
1983–84	Akeem Olajuwon*	C	Jr	Houston	37	500	13.5	
1984–85	Xavier McDaniel (2)	F	Sr	Wichita State	31	460	14.8	
1985–86	David Robinson*	C	Jr	Navy	35	455	13.0	
1986–87	Jerome Lane	F	So	Pittsburgh	33	444	13.5	
1987–88	Kenny Miller	C	Fr	Loyola Chicago	29	395	13.6	
1988–89	Hank Gathers	F	Jr	Loyola Marymount	31	426	13.7	
1989–90	Anthony Bonner	F/C	Sr	Saint Louis	33	456	13.8	
1990–91	Shaquille O'Neal*	C	So	LSU	28	411	14.7	
1991–92	Popeye Jones	F	Sr	Murray State	30	431	14.4	
1992–93	Warren Kidd	F	Sr	Middle Tennessee	26	386	14.8	
1993–94	Jerome Lambert	F	Jr	Baylor	24	355	14.8	
1994–95	Kurt Thomas	C	Sr	TCU	27	393	14.6	
1995–96	Marcus Mann	F	Sr	Mississippi Valley State	29	394	13.6	
1996–97	Tim Duncan*	C	Sr	Wake Forest	31	457	14.7	
1997–98	Ryan Perryman	F	Sr	Dayton	33	412	12.5	
1998–99	Ian McGinnis	F	So	Dartmouth	26	317	12.2	
1999–00	Darren Phillip	F	Sr	Fairfield	29	405	14.0	
2000–01	Chris Marcus	C	So	Western Kentucky	31	374	12.1	
2001–02	Jeremy Bishop	F	Jr	Quinnipiac	29	347	12.0	
2002–03	Brandon Hunter	C/F	Sr	Ohio	30	378	12.6	
2003–04	Paul Millsap	F	Fr	Louisiana Tech	30	374	12.5	
2004–05	Paul Millsap (2)	F	So	Louisiana Tech	29	360	12.4	
2005–06	Paul Millsap (3)	F	Jr	Louisiana Tech	33	438	13.3	
2006–07	Rashad Jones-Jennings	F/C	Sr	Little Rock	30	392	13.1	
2007–08	Michael Beasley	F	Fr	Kansas State	33	408	12.4	
2008–09	Blake Griffin	F	So	Oklahoma	35	504	14.4	
2009–10	Artsiom Parakhouski	C	Sr	Radford	31	414	13.4	
2010–11	Kenneth Faried	F/C	Sr	Morehead State	35	508	14.5	
2011–12	O. D. Anosike	F	Jr	Siena	31	388	12.5	
2012–13	O. D. Anosike (2)	F	Sr	Siena	32	364	11.4	
2013–14	Alan Williams	C	Jr	UC Santa Barbara	28	322	11.5	
2014–15	Alan Williams (2)	C	Sr	UC Santa Barbara	26	308	11.8	
2015–16	Egidijus Mockevičius	C	Sr	Evansville	34	474	13.9	
2016–17	Ángel Delgado	C	Jr	Seton Hall	33	431	13.1	
2017–18	Devontae Cacok	F	Jr	UNC Wilmington	32	431	13.5	
2018–19	Nico Carvacho	F/C	Jr	Colorado State	32	412	12.9	
2019–20	Kevin Marfo	F	Jr	Quinnipiac	30	399	13.3	
2020–21	Fardaws Aimaq	C	So	Utah Valley	22	330	15.0	
2021–22	Oscar Tshiebwe	F/C	Jr	Kentucky	34	515	15.1	
2022–23	Oscar Tshiebwe (2)	F/C	Sr	Kentucky	32	437	13.7	
2023–24	Enrique Freeman	F	Gr	Akron	35	453	12.9	
2024–25	Carson Towt	F	Sr	Northern Arizona	34	423	12.4	
2025–26	Hannes Steinbach	F	Fr	Washington	30	353	11.8	

== Multiple-time leaders ==
Rank	Player	Team	Times leader	Years
1	Paul Millsap	Louisiana Tech	3	2003–04, 2004–05, 2005–06
2	O. D. Anosike	Siena	2	2011–12, 2012–13
2	Artis Gilmore	Jacksonville	2	1969–70, 1970–71
2	Jerry Lucas	Ohio State	2	1960–61, 1961–62
2	Xavier McDaniel	Wichita State	2	1982–83, 1984–85
2	Robert Parish	Centenary	2	1974–75, 1975–76
2	Oscar Tshiebwe	Kentucky	2	2021–22, 2022–23
2	Kermit Washington	American	2	1971–72, 1972–73
2	Alan Williams	UC Santa Barbara	2	2013–14, 2014–15
2	Leroy Wright	Pacific	2	1958–59, 1959–60
