= Michael Beasley =

American basketball player (born 1989)

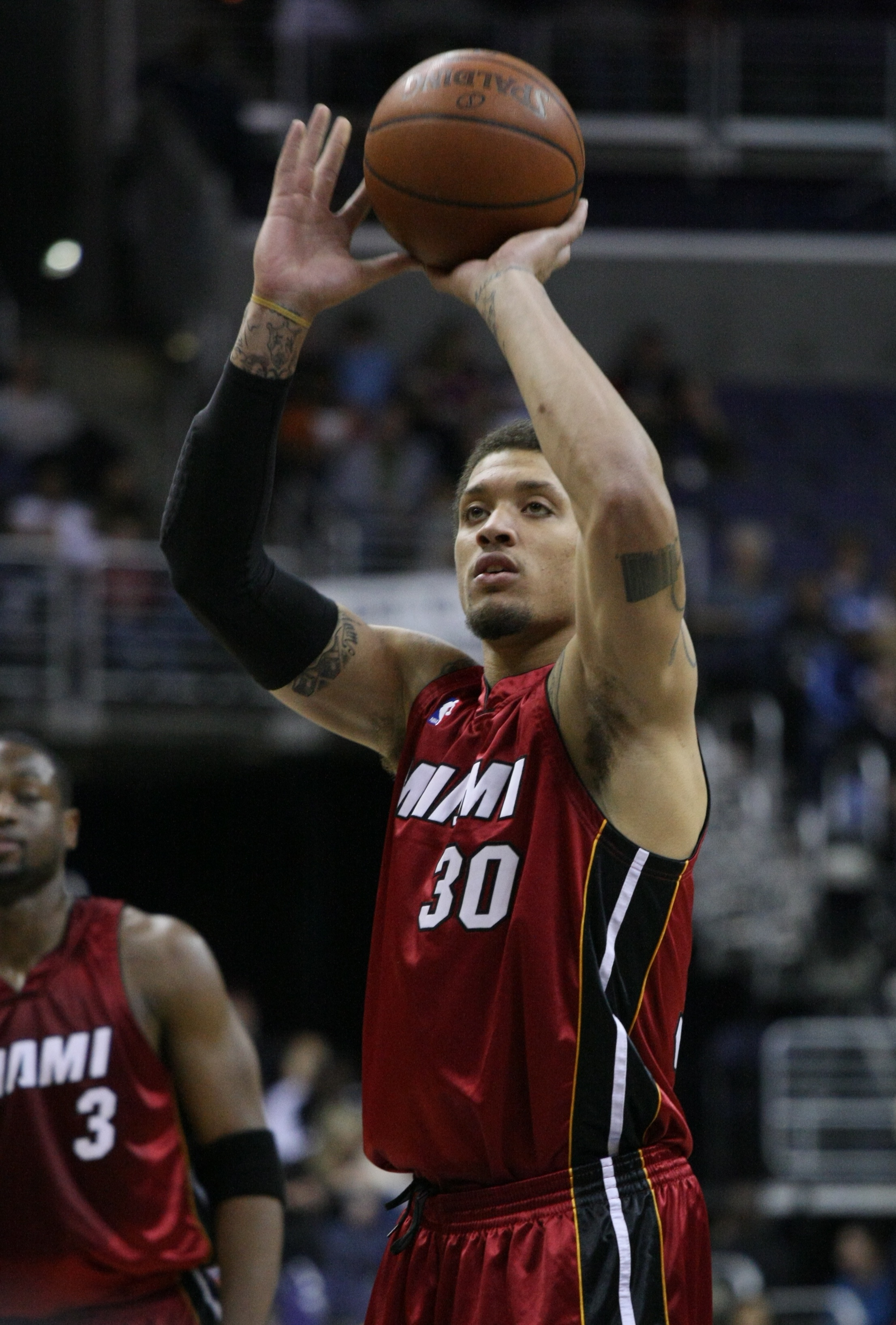
- Beasley with the Miami Heat in 2009

Personal information
- Born: January 9, 1989 (age 37) Cheverly, Maryland, U.S.
- Listed height: 6 ft 9 in (2.06 m)
- Listed weight: 235 lb (107 kg)

Career information
- High school: Notre Dame Prep (Fitchburg, Massachusetts)
- College: Kansas State (2007–2008)
- NBA draft: 2008: 1st round, 2nd overall pick
- Drafted by: Miami Heat
- Playing career: 2008–2024
- Position: Power forward / small forward
- Number: 30, 8, 0, 9, 11

Career history
- 2008–2010: Miami Heat
- 2010–2012: Minnesota Timberwolves
- 2012–2013: Phoenix Suns
- 2013–2014: Miami Heat
- 2014–2015: Shanghai Sharks
- 2015: Miami Heat
- 2015–2016: Shandong Golden Stars
- 2016: Houston Rockets
- 2016–2017: Milwaukee Bucks
- 2017–2018: New York Knicks
- 2018–2019: Los Angeles Lakers
- 2019: Guangdong Southern Tigers
- 2021: Cangrejeros de Santurce
- 2022: Shanghai Sharks

Career highlights
- CBA champion (2019); CBA Foreign MVP (2016); 2× CBA All-Star (2015, 2016); 2× CBA All-Star Game MVP (2015, 2016); NBA All-Rookie First Team (2009); Consensus first-team All-American (2008); Pete Newell Big Man Award (2008); USBWA National Freshman of the Year (2008); NCAA rebounding leader (2008); Big 12 Player of the Year (2008); First-team All-Big 12 (2008); McDonald's All-American Game MVP (2007); Second-team Parade All-American (2006)
- Stats at NBA.com
- Stats at Basketball Reference
Medals
Men's basketball
Representing United States
FIBA U19 World Championship
Silver medal – second place	2007 Serbia	Team competition
FIBA Americas U18 Championship
Gold medal – first place	2006 San Antonio	Team competition

Michael Paul Beasley Jr. (born January 9, 1989) is an American former professional basketball player who played eleven seasons in the National Basketball Association (NBA) for seven teams, most notably the Miami Heat. He played one year of college basketball for the Kansas State Wildcats before declaring for the 2008 NBA draft. Beasley was selected as the second overall pick in the draft by the Miami Heat. He is regarded as one of the best freshman college basketball players of the 2000s. Though he is ambidextrous, he shoots left-handed.

== Early life ==
Beasley was born in the Prince George's County town of Cheverly, Maryland. Beasley's mother Fatima Smith and his four siblings (two brothers and two sisters) moved from nearby Montgomery County to Frederick in 2005 and lived there for one year.

== High school career ==
While growing up, Beasley played for one of the country's most successful AAU youth teams at the time, the PG Jaguars. Beasley won multiple national championships with this team alongside future fellow blue-chip recruits Kevin Durant (Texas) and Chris Braswell (Charlotte). Beasley later moved on to play AAU ball for DC Assault's 17 & Under team, playing alongside such players as future KSU teammate Ron Anderson, Nolan Smith (Duke), Chris Wright (Georgetown), Austin Freeman (Georgetown), and Julian Vaughn (Georgetown).

Beasley attended a total of six high schools: Bowie High School in Bowie, Maryland, National Christian Academy in Fort Washington, Maryland (where he averaged 30 points and 10 rebounds per game in his freshman year, 2003–04), The Pendleton School in Bradenton, Florida, Riverdale Baptist School in Upper Marlboro, Maryland (28 points, 13 rebounds and 4 blocks per game as a sophomore, 2004–05), Oak Hill Academy in Mouth of Wilson, Virginia (20.1 points, 10.3 rebounds and 4.5 blocks per game as a junior, 2005–06), and Notre Dame Preparatory School in Fitchburg, Massachusetts. As a high school senior, he averaged 28 points, 16 rebounds, 4 assists, 2 steals and 4.5 blocks per game for the 2006–07 season. During his senior season he had single-game highs of 64 points and 31 rebounds.

In 2006, Beasley was a second-team Parade All-American and was also named to the 2006 USA Men's U18 National Team member on June 26, 2006. Beasley averaged team highs of 13.8 ppg. and 8.3 rpg at the 2006 FIBA Americas U18 Championship for Men in San Antonio, Texas. He ranked fifth in rebounds per game (8.3 rpg) among all 2006 tournament leaders, and he ranks third all-time in the USA Men's U18 record book. He was named to the McDonald's All-American team. In the 2007 McDonald's All-American Boys Game, he won the MVP with 23 points and 12 rebounds. Rivals.com rated Beasley No. 1 in the class of 2007 high school basketball prospects. He committed to Kansas State, where his AAU coach Dalonte Hill had joined as an assistant coach.

== College career ==
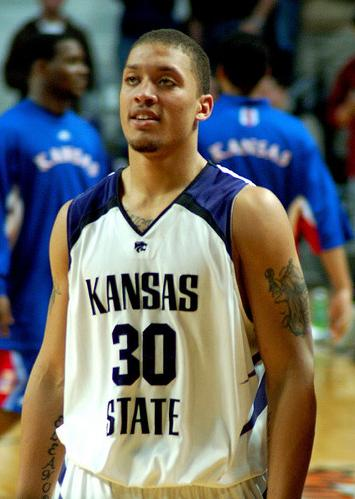
Beasley at Kansas State

Beasley began his freshman year at Kansas State in the fall of 2007. In the 2007–2008 regular season, Beasley was one of the most dominant players in the country. His 26.2 points (3rd in the nation) and nation-leading 12.4 rebounds were the most by a Big 12 player in any season. His 866 total points and 408 rebounds ranked third and second among all freshmen in NCAA history. He also led the nation in double-doubles (28), 40-point games (three), 30-point, 10-rebound games (13), and 20-point, 10-rebound games (22). His 28 double-doubles broke the freshman double-double record previously held by Carmelo Anthony who had 22 double-doubles in his only season at Syracuse in 2002–03. On February 23, 2008, Beasley scored a Big 12 record 44 points in a 92–86 loss at Baylor. (This mark has since been matched by Kansas State's Denis Clemente.) Beasley became known as an unstoppable force when shooting, finishing the season shooting 53.7 percent from the field (282 of 525). He also finished the season shooting 39.5 percent from 3-point range.

Beasley holds 30 Kansas State career, single-season and freshman records as well as 17 Big 12 single-game and single-season marks. Beasley guided the Wildcats to a 20–10 record and a 10–6 Big 12 Conference record. Some of the key conference victories were a win at Oklahoma and, a home victory against Texas A&M, and a victory against then-unbeaten No. 2 Kansas, marking the first time in over four years that Kansas State defeated a Top 10 team at home (Kansas State beat No. 10 Texas, 58–48 on March 6, 2004), the first time K-State beat Kansas in Manhattan since 1983 and the first-ever victory against the Jayhawks in Bramlage Coliseum. The win partially backed up a boast he had made before the season about K-State's prospects against the Jayhawks:

We're going to beat Kansas at home. We're going to beat them in their house. We're going to beat them in Africa. Wherever we play, we're going to beat them.

On March 1, 2008, his boast did not come true, as Kansas won the return match in Lawrence, 88–74 despite 39 points and 11 rebounds from Beasley. He matched a Big 12 record by equaling former Kansas player Drew Gooden's record for most double-doubles in a season (25). With his 33-point, 14-rebound effort against Colorado on March 4, he eclipsed Mitch Richmond's 20-year-old school single-season points record (768; 1987–88), while he broke the Big 12 record for double-doubles in a season with his 26th for the year. He is just the 27th player in NCAA Division I history to post 26 or more double-doubles in a season and the first since Utah's Andrew Bogut (26) did it in 2004–05.

Beasley led the Wildcats to a 10–6 record in conference play, earning a number 3 seed in the 2008 Big 12 men's basketball tournament at the Sprint Center in Kansas City, Missouri. The Wildcats faced the No. 6 seed Texas A&M Aggies and lost 77–71. Beasley had 25 points and 9 rebounds, one board short of a double-double. He shot 10–21 from the field and 1–4 from behind the three-point line. He also registered three blocks. The Wildcats earned a berth in the 2008 NCAA Men's Division I Basketball Tournament as the No. 11 seed in the Midwest Region. They beat the No. 6 seed USC Trojans. Beasley had 23 points and 11 rebounds for his 27th double-double of the year. However, the Wildcats lost 72–55 to No. 3 Wisconsin in the second round of the tournament. Beasley added 23 points (only 6 scored in the second half) and 13 rebounds against the Badgers his 28th and final double-double.

On April 14, 2008, Beasley announced that he would forgo his last three years of eligibility and enter the NBA draft.

=== Awards and honors ===
Beasley is one of just two players in Kansas State history to earn first team All-America honors from the Associated Press. Overall, Beasley is the fifth player in school history to earn recognition to any of organization's three All-America teams. Beasley was one of 24 finalists for the John R. Wooden Player of the Year award and was selected by voters to the 10-member 2008 John R. Wooden Award All American team. He followed Kevin Durant as the second consecutive standout freshman to win both Big 12 Player of the Year and Freshman of the Year accolades.

Beasley became the fourth player in school history to be honored as the conference's Player of the Year and the first since the inception of the Big 12. He was the first player to be named league Freshman of the Year and the 12th overall to be selected as either Freshman or Newcomer of the Year since 1970.

Beasley was named National Freshman of the Year by CBS Sports.com, Rivals.com, The Sporting News, and the U.S. Basketball Writers Association (USBWA). He has also been selected a first team All-American by numerous outlets, including CBS Sports.com, Dick Vitale, ESPN.com, Rivals.com, Sports Illustrated, The Sporting News and U.S. Basketball Writers Association. In addition, he was chosen as a first team Freshman All-American by CBS Sports.com and Rivals.com.

In addition, he was named one of four finalists for the 2008 Naismith Player of the Year Award. He also was one of 10 finalists for the Oscar Robertson Player of the Year award.

== Professional career ==
=== Miami Heat (2008–2010) ===
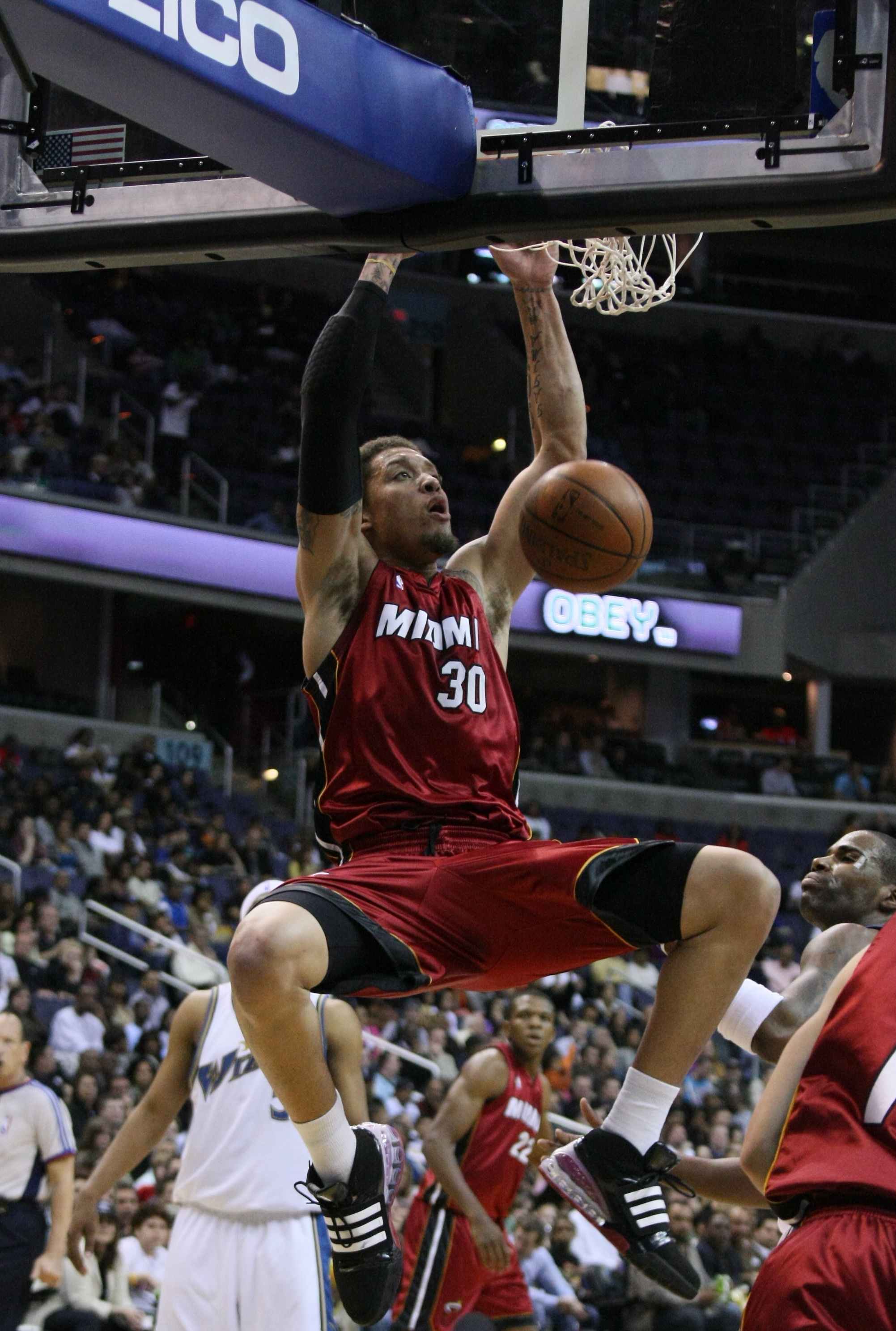
Beasley during his first tenure with the Heat

On June 26, 2008, Beasley was selected 2nd overall in the 2008 NBA draft by the Miami Heat. He signed with the Heat on July 2.

In his NBA Summer League debut on July 7, Beasley scored 28 points and grabbed 9 rebounds (and had 2 assists) in 23 minutes played. He was second in the league in rebound average, and tied for third in scoring average in the 2008 Summer League. During his first official practice with the Heat, he was accidentally hit in the chest with an unidentified teammate's elbow. He was evaluated and returned to the team a day later with chest bruising, but only participated in non-contact play. He had slightly cracked his sternum, and resumed contact drills 2 days after that.

In his first preseason game, Beasley scored 16 points against the Detroit Pistons. He followed those performances with 21 points and 7 rebounds, 12 points and 11 rebounds, 14 points and 6 rebounds, 19 points and no rebounds, 14 points and 3 rebounds, and 19 points and 9 rebounds. On opening night of the 2008–09 regular season, Beasley scored 9 points in a loss against the New York Knicks. He posted double-digit point totals for the next nine straight games, including a season-high 25 points in a loss to Charlotte on November 1.

Offensively, I've been a big believer in him, I just think he can score. I said it two years ago: I think one day he may lead the league in scoring. He has a Carmelo Anthony ability to score the ball. He's a matchup problem every night, He has quickness and a shot at that size. That makes him tough to guard.

— Doc Rivers

After the Heat's first round exit from the 2009 playoffs, it was reported that Beasley, along with fellow rookie Mario Chalmers, had been fined multiple times throughout the season for violations of team policy.

During the 2009–10 season, he was a starter for the entire season. On February 19, 2010, he led the Heat to victory over the Memphis Grizzlies with a then career-high 30 points along with 8 rebounds. For the season, he averaged 14.8 points per game and 6.4 rebounds per game. In the Heat's first-round playoff series loss to Boston, those averages declined to 10.4 and 5.8, respectively.

=== Minnesota Timberwolves (2010–2012) ===
On July 12, 2010, Beasley was traded to the Minnesota Timberwolves in exchange for 2011 and 2014 second-round draft picks. Beasley was traded in order to clear salary cap space for Miami, allowing them to sign free agents LeBron James and Chris Bosh, as well as re-sign Dwyane Wade.

On November 10, 2010, he led the Timberwolves to victory over the Sacramento Kings with a career-high 42 points along with 9 rebounds. He finished the season averaging 19.2 points per game which was ranked top 20 in the league. In the 2011–12 season, Beasley sprained his foot against the Cleveland Cavaliers on January 6, 2012, which kept him out for 11 straight games. Shortly after he returned from injury, he led the Timberwolves to victory over the Houston Rockets with 34 points. Over the 2011–12 season, he averaged 11.5 points per game.

=== Phoenix Suns (2012–2013) ===
On July 20, 2012, Beasley signed a three-year, $18 million contract with the Phoenix Suns. Around this time, he decided to train with former two-time NBA champion point guard Norm Nixon in order to improve his game. In a November 7, 2012, game against the Charlotte Bobcats, Beasley scored 21 points, grabbed 15 rebounds, and had 7 assists to help the Suns win 117–110. On January 30, 2013, Beasley scored a season-high 27 points with 6 rebounds and 5 steals off the bench to lead the Suns to a 92–86 victory against the Los Angeles Lakers.

On September 3, 2013, Beasley was waived by the Suns. The decision came shortly after Beasley had been arrested on suspicion of marijuana possession. Lon Babby, the Suns' president of basketball operations, said, "We worked hard to devote ourselves to Michael's success, but we have to maintain the standards to build a championship culture."

=== Return to Miami (2013–2014) ===
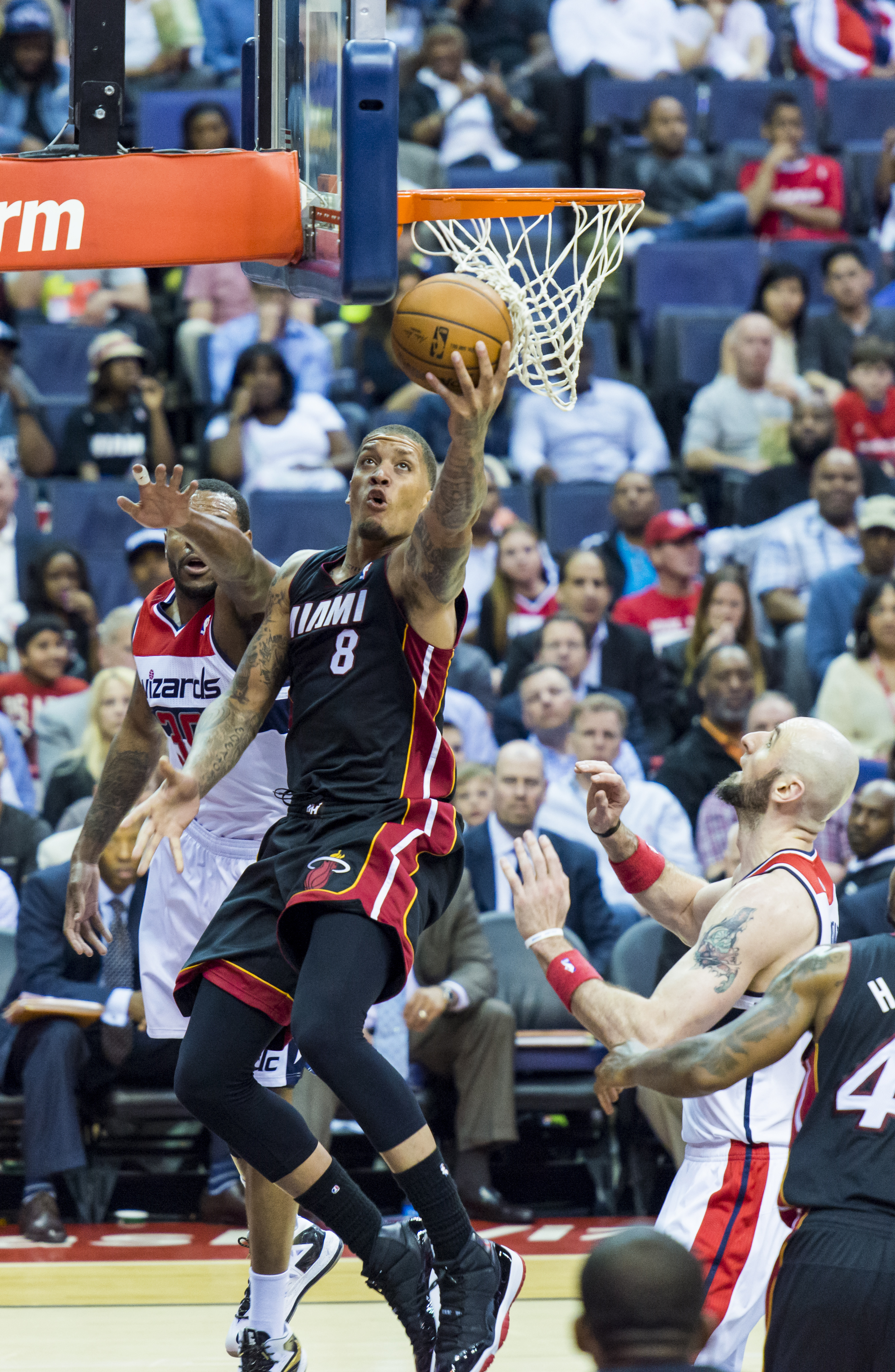
Beasley during his second tenure with the Heat, playing against the Washington Wizards in April 2014.

On September 11, 2013, Beasley signed with the Miami Heat. The Heat made it to the NBA Finals for the fourth straight time in 2014, with Beasley making his first Finals appearance in Game 5 of their series against the San Antonio Spurs. The Heat lost Game 5 and the series, as the Spurs won 4–1.

=== Shanghai Sharks (2014–2015) ===
On September 25, 2014, Beasley signed a non-guaranteed contract with the Memphis Grizzlies. However, he was later waived by the Grizzlies on October 9. That same day, he signed a one-year deal with the Shanghai Sharks of the Chinese Basketball Association. During the 2015 CBA All-Star Game, Beasley came off the bench to score 59 points, setting a CBA record for most points in the league's All-Star Game.

Despite averaging 28.6 points, 10.4 rebounds, 5.2 assists and 1.9 steals in 37 games, Beasley could not lead the Sharks to the CBA playoffs as they finished 12th with a 17–21 record.

=== Third stint with Heat (2015) ===
On February 26, 2015, Beasley signed a 10-day contract with the Miami Heat. The next day, he made his return for the Heat, scoring seven points in a 104–102 loss to the New Orleans Pelicans. He then signed a second 10-day contract with the Heat on March 8, and for the rest of the season on March 18.

On June 28, 2015, the Heat declined to pick up their $1.3 million team option on Beasley's 2015–16 contract, making him a free agent.

=== Shandong Golden Stars (2015–2016) ===
On September 30, 2015, Beasley signed with the Shandong Golden Stars for the 2015–16 CBA season, returning to China for a second stint. He scored 48 points in the team's season opener on November 1, and bested that mark with 49 points ten days later. On January 17, 2016, he won the CBA All-Star Game MVP award for the second straight year after recording 63 points, 19 rebounds and 13 assists for the South team. Shandong qualified for the 2016 playoffs, but were defeated 3–0 by the Guangdong Southern Tigers in the first round. In 40 games for Shandong, Beasley averaged 31.9 points, 13.4 rebounds, 3.8 assists, 2.0 steals and 1.3 blocks per game. He was subsequently named the league's Foreign MVP for the 2015–16 season.

=== Houston Rockets (2016) ===
On March 4, 2016, Beasley signed with the Houston Rockets. In his third game for the Rockets on March 11, he recorded 18 points and 8 rebounds in just under 15 minutes off the bench in a 102–98 win over the Boston Celtics. On March 19, he recorded a season-high 30 points and 9 rebounds in a 109–97 loss to the Atlanta Hawks. On March 31, he recorded his first double-double of the season with 20 points and 11 rebounds in a 103–100 loss to the Chicago Bulls. Beasley helped the Rockets finish the regular season as the eighth seed in the Western Conference with a 41–41 record. Down 2–0 to the first-seeded Golden State Warriors in the first round of the playoffs, Beasley scored 12 points in a 97–96 Game 3 win in Houston; he gave Houston a 95–94 lead with two free throws with 41 seconds left.

=== Milwaukee Bucks (2016–2017) ===
On September 22, 2016, Beasley was traded to the Milwaukee Bucks in exchange for Tyler Ennis. On November 12, 2016, he scored a season-high 19 points in a 106–96 win over the Memphis Grizzlies. He missed five games in December with a foot injury. On January 10, 2017, he set a new season high with 28 points in a 109–107 win over the San Antonio Spurs. On March 31, 2017, he returned after missing 17 games with a hyperextended left knee, scoring seven points in eight minutes in a 108–105 win over the Detroit Pistons.

=== New York Knicks (2017–2018) ===
On August 8, 2017, Beasley signed with the New York Knicks. On November 25, 2017, he had a season-high 30 points starting in place of the injured Kristaps Porziņģis in a 117–102 loss to the Houston Rockets. On December 16, 2017, once again starting in place of Porziņģis, Beasley tied his season high with 30 points in a 111–96 win over the Oklahoma City Thunder. On December 21, 2017, he scored 28 of his season-high 32 points in the second half of the Knicks' 102–93 win over the Boston Celtics. He also had 12 rebounds against the Celtics. Beasley became the first NBA player since starts were recorded in the 1970–71 season to come off the bench and have at least 32 points and 12 rebounds while playing 25 minutes or fewer. He also became the first Knicks sub ever with a 32–12 game. On January 10, 2018, he recorded 26 points and 12 rebounds off the bench in a 122–119 double overtime loss to the Chicago Bulls. On March 31, 2018, he had a 32-point effort in a 115–109 loss to the Detroit Pistons.

=== Los Angeles Lakers (2018–2019) ===
On July 23, 2018, Beasley signed with the Los Angeles Lakers. He missed much of the first half of the season to be with his sick mother.

On February 7, 2019, Beasley and Ivica Zubac were traded to the Los Angeles Clippers in exchange for Mike Muscala. He was waived by the Clippers two days later.

=== Guangdong Southern Tigers (2019) ===
On February 20, 2019, Beasley signed with the Guangdong Southern Tigers.

On July 9, 2020, the Brooklyn Nets announced that they had signed Beasley as substitute player for the remainder of the 2019–20 season. However, his contract was voided when he tested positive for COVID-19.

=== Cangrejeros de Santurce (2021) ===
Beasley joined the Portland Trail Blazers for the 2021 NBA Summer League. On October 5, he signed with Cangrejeros de Santurce of the Baloncesto Superior Nacional.

=== Shanghai Sharks (2022) ===
In October 2022, Beasley had a four-game stint with the Shanghai Sharks in China.

=== BIG3 (2023–present) ===
In June 2023, Beasley signed for the 3's Company to play in the BIG3. He played there in the 2023 and 2024 BIG3 seasons.

In June 2025, Beasley signed for the Miami 305 to play in the BIG3. He served as the co-captain of the team that won the 2025 BIG3 league while he was also named the BIG3 Most Valuable Player. His team defeated the Chicago Triplets in the BIG3 championship game. In May 2026, Beasley confirmed that he will play for the Miami 305 in the 2026 BIG3 league.

=== TNC 1v1 vs Lance Stephenson (2025) ===
On June 6, 2025, Beasley went head-to-head against former NBA player, Lance Stephenson at the TNC 02 event held at Miami, Florida. Beasley beat Lance, 31-21 for $100,000.

== Career statistics ==
Legend
GP	Games played	GS	Games started	MPG	Minutes per game
FG%	Field goal percentage	3P%	3-point field goal percentage	FT%	Free throw percentage
RPG	Rebounds per game	APG	Assists per game	SPG	Steals per game
BPG	Blocks per game	PPG	Points per game	**Bold**	Career high

=== NBA ===
==== Regular season ====
Year	Team	GP	GS	MPG	FG%	3P%	FT%	RPG	APG	SPG	BPG	PPG
2008–09	Miami	**81**	19	24.8	.472	.407	.772	5.4	1.0	.5	.5	13.9
2009–10	Miami	78	**78**	29.8	.450	.275	**.800**	**6.4**	1.3	**1.0**	.6	14.8
2010–11	Minnesota	73	73	**32.3**	.450	.366	.753	5.6	**2.2**	.7	**.7**	**19.2**
2011–12	Minnesota	47	7	23.1	.445	.376	.642	4.4	1.0	.4	.4	11.5
2012–13	Phoenix	75	20	20.7	.405	.313	.746	3.8	1.5	.4	.5	10.1
2013–14	Miami	55	2	15.1	.499	.389	.772	3.1	.7	.4	.4	7.9
2014–15	Miami	24	1	21.0	.434	.235	.769	3.7	1.3	.6	.5	8.8
2015–16	Houston	20	0	18.2	.522	.333	.776	4.9	.8	.6	.5	12.8
2016–17	Milwaukee	56	6	16.7	**.533**	**.419**	.743	3.4	.9	.5	.5	9.4
2017–18	New York	74	30	22.3	.507	.395	.780	5.6	1.7	.5	.6	13.2
2018–19	L.A. Lakers	26	2	10.7	.490	.176	.718	2.3	1.0	.3	.4	7.0
Career		609	238	22.8	.465	.349	.759	4.7	1.3	.6	.5	12.4

==== Playoffs ====
Year	Team	GP	GS	MPG	FG%	3P%	FT%	RPG	APG	SPG	BPG	PPG
2009	Miami	**7**	0	25.4	.386	.308	.765	**7.3**	**1.0**	.3	**1.0**	**12.1**
2010	Miami	5	**5**	**27.0**	.449	.500	.778	5.8	.6	**.8**	.0	10.4
2014	Miami	4	0	5.8	**.500**	.000	.333	1.0	.5	.0	.0	2.8
2016	Houston	5	0	16.0	.478	.333	**.857**	4.2	.6	.2	.0	10.4
2017	Milwaukee	4	0	12.0	.350	**.600**	.000	2.3	.3	.3	.3	4.3
Career		25	5	18.6	.423	.385	.675	4.6	.6	.3	.3	8.7

=== College ===
Year	Team	GP	GS	MPG	FG%	3P%	FT%	RPG	APG	SPG	BPG	PPG
2007–08	Kansas State	33	33	31.5	.532	.379	.774	12.4	1.2	1.3	1.6	26.2

=== CBA ===
Year	Team	GP	GS	MPG	FG%	3P%	FT%	RPG	APG	SPG	BPG	PPG
2014–15	Shanghai	37	30	38.1	.513	.354	.756	10.4	5.2	2.2	0.8	28.7
2015–16	Shandong	40	24	36.5	.541	.371	.779	13.2	3.8	2.0	1.3	31.9
2018–19	Guangdong	5	5	33.0	.500	.333	.645	9.8	4.4	1.6	2.2	22.4
2022–23	Shanghai	4	1	16.0	.533	.408	.909	5.2	1.5	0.8	1.2	11.5

=== BSN ===
Year	Team	GP	GS	MPG	FG%	3P%	FT%	RPG	APG	SPG	BPG	PPG
2020–21	Santurce	2	2	31.0	.467	.273	.714	12.5	3.0	0.5	1.5	25.0

== Personal life ==
Beasley's parents are Fatima Smith and Michael Beasley Sr. Beasley's mother died of cancer in December 2018. He has two brothers, Leroy Ellison and Malik Smith, and two younger sisters, Mychaela Beasley and Tiffany Couch. He has a daughter Mikaiya, born in May 2009 and a son Michael III, born in November 2010. As of 2024 he has five more girls and two more boys. Beasley grew up with Kevin Durant and Nolan Smith, and remains friends with both players.

=== Legal issues ===
On September 3, 2008, at the NBA's Rookie Transition Program, Beasley was involved in an incident along with fellow rookies Mario Chalmers and Darrell Arthur. Police responded to the hotel room of Chalmers and Arthur following a fire alarm at 2 am and claimed that the room smelled strongly of burning marijuana, but none was found and no charges were filed. Chalmers and Arthur were excused from the camp because of the incident and were later fined $20,000 each for missing the rookie camp, but were not fined or suspended for any drug-related violations. Both later denied any involvement with marijuana. Originally, ESPN reported that Beasley was also present in the room, but was not asked to leave camp. The story was later updated and any mention of Beasley was removed from the article.

On September 18, 2008, Beasley was fined $50,000 by the league for his involvement in the incident after he confessed to league officials that he had slipped out the door when the police arrived.

On August 24, 2009, Beasley reportedly checked into a Houston rehab center, just days after he posted pictures of himself on Twitter with what some have speculated to be marijuana in the background. It is unknown if the rehab was drug related; officially he was receiving counseling for stress-related issues.

On June 26, 2011, Beasley was driving in the Minneapolis suburb of Minnetonka when he was pulled over by a policeman for speeding. The policeman noticed that the car smelled of a strong odor of marijuana. The officer allegedly found marijuana in a plastic bag under the front passenger seat. However, Beasley said the marijuana was not his, but belonged to a friend whom he had just dropped off. Beasley was consequently fined and ticketed.

In August 2011, Beasley was on a streetball tour in New York City with All-Star forward Kevin Durant when he got into an altercation with a heckler, shoving a hand in the heckler's face.

On August 6, 2013, Beasley was arrested on suspicion of marijuana possession in Scottsdale, Arizona. According to police reports, narcotics were confiscated from Beasley's car after he was stopped for a traffic violation. That arrest was a factor in Beasley's official removal from the Suns a month later.

In September 2014, a sexual assault case from January 2013 involving Beasley was dropped after no probable cause was established.

On August 8, 2019, he was suspended five games for violating the NBA’s anti-drug policy.

On February 9, 2025, Beasley was arrested by the Riley County Police Department for attempting to board an airplane at Manhattan Regional Airport with six grams of marijuana. He was released later that day on a $750 bond.

=== MMA ===
In May 2026, Beasley ventured into the world of mixed martial arts. He faced fellow NBA player Lance Stephenson in an amateur bout on May 23 at an event held by Brand Risk Promotions. He lost the fight via a rear-naked choke submission in the first round.

== See also ==
- 2006 high school boys basketball All-Americans
- List of NCAA Division I men's basketball season rebounding leaders
