= Dontell Jefferson =

American basketball player

Personal information
- Born: December 15, 1983 (age 42) Cordele, Georgia, U.S.
- Listed height: 6 ft 5 in (1.96 m)
- Listed weight: 195 lb (88 kg)

Career information
- High school: Stephenson (Stone Mountain, Georgia)
- College: Atlanta Metropolitan (2002–2004); Arkansas (2004–2006)
- NBA draft: 2006: undrafted
- Playing career: 2006–2018
- Position: Shooting guard
- Number: 2

Career history
- 2006–2008: Dakota Wizards
- 2008: Barons LMT
- 2008–2009: Utah Flash
- 2009: Charlotte Bobcats
- 2009–2010: Utah Flash
- 2010–2011: Idaho Stampede
- 2011: Quebec Kebs
- 2011: Idaho Stampede
- 2011–2012: Sioux Falls Skyforce
- 2012–2013: Reno Bighorns
- 2013: Austin Toros
- 2014–2015: Al-Hilal

Career highlights
- All-NBA D-League Third Team (2009)
- Stats at NBA.com
- Stats at Basketball Reference

Dontell Jefferson (born December 15, 1983) is an American professional basketball player. He played briefly in the National Basketball Association (NBA), as well as stints in the NBA Development League and in Canada, Latvia, and Saudi Arabia. He played college basketball for the Arkansas Razorbacks and Atlanta Metropolitan College.

== College career ==
After two years of junior college basketball at Atlanta Metropolitan College, Jefferson completed his college career at the University of Arkansas, lettering in the 2004–05 and 2005–06 seasons. He led the team in assists in 2006 and played in the 2006 NCAA Men's Tournament.

== Professional career ==
After his senior season, Jefferson was not selected in the 2006 NBA draft.

On March 11, 2009, Jefferson was signed to a 10-day contract by the Charlotte Bobcats. He signed a second 10-day contract on March 21. He then signed for the remainder of the 2008–09 NBA season. On October 22, 2009, Jefferson was waived by the Bobcats.

In 2012, Jefferson was drafted by the Reno Bighorns in the NBA D-League Draft. On February 22, 2013, he was traded to the Austin Toros.

In July 2013, KTP-Basket announced that Jefferson would be part of their 2013–14 roster. However, he left them before the start of the season. In April 2014, he signed with Al Hilal of Libya.

In July 2014 Jefferson signed with Al Ahly in Qatar for the 2014–2015 season.

In January 2016 Jefferson signed with Qatar Club in Qatar.

In August 2016, Jefferson signed with Al Fateh in Saudi Arabia for the 2016–2017 season. Swingman of the year and First team All Saudi Arabian team.

In November 2017, Jefferson resigns with Al Fateh in Saudi Arabia.

== NBA career statistics ==
Legend
GP	Games played	GS	Games started	MPG	Minutes per game
FG%	Field goal percentage	3P%	3-point field goal percentage	FT%	Free throw percentage
RPG	Rebounds per game	APG	Assists per game	SPG	Steals per game
BPG	Blocks per game	PPG	Points per game	**Bold**	Career high

=== Regular season ===
Year	Team	GP	GS	MPG	FG%	3P%	FT%	RPG	APG	SPG	BPG	PPG
2008–09	Charlotte	6	0	14.0	.500	.500	.667	2.0	1.5	.7	.2	4.8
Career		6	0	14.0	.500	.500	.667	2.0	1.5	.7	.2	4.8
