= Véronique Prince =

Canadian journalist (born 1984)

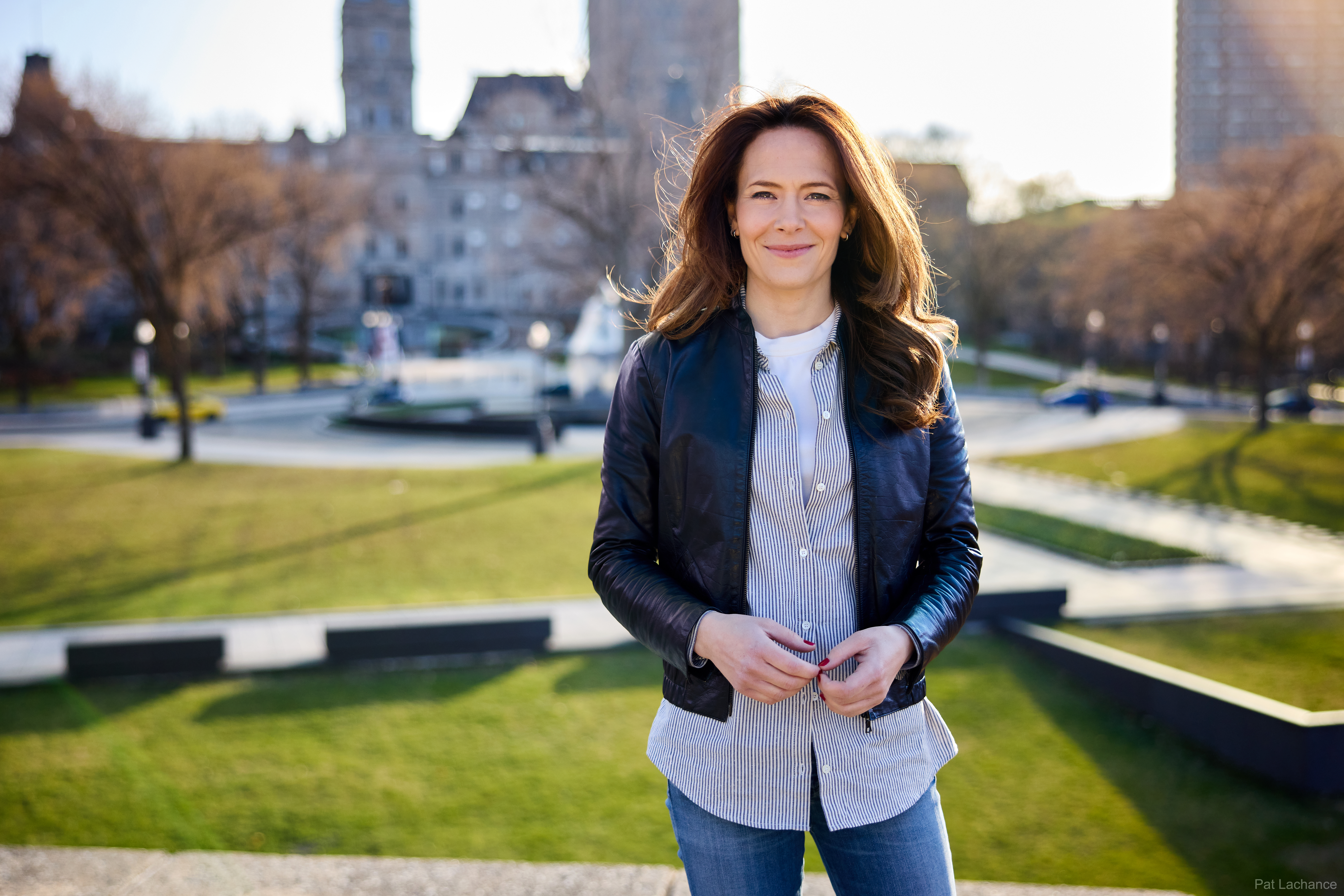
- Born: 1984 (age 41–42); Quebec City, Canada
- Education: Concordia University, Université Laval
- Occupation: Journalist
- Years active: 2005–present
- Employer: Radio-Canada
- Known for: Quebec politics
- Notable work: Là, tout de suite? La gestion de crise gouvernementale à l'ère de l'instantanéité médiatique
- Website: Radio-Canada - Véronique Prince

Véronique Prince (born 1984 in Quebec) is a Canadian journalist who specializes in politics.

== Biography ==
Véronique Prince is a French-speaking Canadian journalist and parliamentary correspondent in Quebec since 2013. Currently on air at Radio-Canada as a national reporter, she covers Quebec politics.

She began her career in 2005 at the age of 20. After a brief stint in Trois-Rivières for the TQS network, she covered Montreal news for three years on the show Le Grand Journal, hosted by Jean-Luc Mongrain. After the closure of TQS's news department in 2008, she joined the team at TVA Nouvelles and LCN for nine years. Initially a journalist for the public affairs show JE, she was then assigned to cover general news in the metropolis.

Holding a bachelor's degree in political science from Concordia University, Véronique Prince also completed a master's in political science at Université Laval, alongside her journalism work. In 2019, she published the book Là, tout de suite? La gestion de crise gouvernementale à l'ère de l'instantanéité médiatique, based on her master's thesis. She also holds a college certificate from the Collège radio télévision de Québec (CRTQ), as well as a college diploma from Champlain - St. Lawrence College.

As a parliamentary correspondent, she participated in the coverage of three provincial election campaigns (2014, 2018, 2022) and two U.S. presidential nights. At Radio-Canada, she presents her reports on Ici Télé and RDI news bulletins, while also contributing to radio as a journalist and columnist on Ici Première, in addition to writing articles for Radio-Canada.ca. In 2018–2019, she was president of the Québec Parliamentary Press.

== Publications ==
- Prince, Véronique; Giasson, Thierry (2019). Là, tout de suite? La gestion de crise gouvernementale à l'ère de l'instantanéité médiatique. Les Presses de l'Université du Québec. p. 164. ISBN 978-2-7605-5182-4.
- Prince, Véronique; Giasson, Thierry (2018). "La gestion des crises communicationnelles du gouvernement Couillard". In Pétry; François; Birch; Lisa (eds.). Bilan du gouvernement de Philippe Couillard 158 promesses et un mandat contrasté. Presses de l’Université Laval. pp. 47–61. ISBN 978-2-7637-3870-3.
