= Henry Habib =

Henri Habib is the distinguished professor emeritus at Concordia University. He established the Political Science Department at Loyola College, and was instrumental in establishing the Global Forum for International Co-operation (GFIC). He is a well-known authority on Middle Eastern politics.

Habib received his bachelor's degree in political science from the American University of Beirut in Beirut, Lebanon; his M.A. from Fordham University; and his Ph.D. from McGill University.

He is of Lebanese Christian descent and is currently in semi-retirement, teaching courses in World History, Middle Eastern politics and international law at Concordia University, McGill University, University of Ottawa and Carleton University. He currently lives in Ottawa. He is also the second cousin of renowned diplomat Philip Habib.

Henry Habib's grandfather was a lieutenant governor for the Ottoman Empire in Jerusalem; he was responsible for Christian and Jewish affairs in Jerusalem.
