= Aimee Louw =

- Education: Concordia University
- Occupations: activist, writer, radio host, performer
- Known for: Accessibilize Montreal, Underwater City Project

Aimee Louw is a disabled activist, writer, and radio host currently living in Montreal, Quebec, Canada. She works to fight ableism and her work is informed by queer and feminist theory. She studied Political Science at Concordia University. She has presented at conferences at both McGill University and York University about her research on social movements and disability rhetoric. She works for Cinema Politica, cofounded Accessibilize Montreal, and co-hosts the radio show Native Solidarity News. She has also spoken on the radio show Talking Radically. She is the creator of the zine and tumblr Underwater City Project. She has been published in the Montreal Gazette.

== Underwater City Project ==
Underwater City Zine 1: Searching for the Most Accessible City in Canada details Louw's travels to different cities in Canada. The zine is a reflection on living with limited mobility and the accessibility of various cities. The zine is composed of journals and conversations with other disabled people. The name is inspired by Louw's idea that an underwater city would be an accessible utopia for all people.

== Challenging the Société de transport de Montréal ==
Louw has been vocal about ablecentrist practices of the Société de transport de Montréal (STM). She has filed a complaint for getting caught in a turnstile while in a wheelchair and also filed a complaint when a bus driver refused to lower the bus ramp for her. Louw demanded answers, supported by other activists, for the second incident at an STM monthly meeting when she pointed out that an early STM report said that ramps only work half the time.
