= Abdelatif Hannachi =

- عبد اللطيف الحناشي
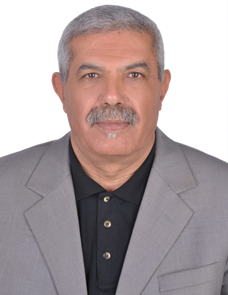
- Born: 1954; Gabes, Tunisia
- Occupations: author, historian, professor

Abdelatif Hannachi (Arabic: عبد اللطيف الحناشي) is a Tunisian author, historian, and professor. He earned his doctorate at Tunis University, and is currently teaching at Manouba University.

== Works ==
- Point of view of Bourguiba toward the union Arab difficulties, (1956–1970)
- The evaluation of Tunisian point of view toward Palestinian issue (1920–1955), 2006
