= JJ Levine =

Canadian photographer

- Known for: Artist
- Notable work: Queer Portraits
- Style: Photographic portrait artist
- Website: Official website

JJ Levine is a Montreal-based Canadian artist working in photographic portraiture. His work questions traditional gender identity roles through posed photographs of queer subjects in domestic spaces and situations.

== Work ==
A photograph from the series Alone Time. Both subjects are portrayed by a single model, with differing gender presentations created by costuming, makeup, and posing. As is common with Levine's work, the subjects are depicted in an intimate domestic setting featuring saturated colors and textures.

Levine is best known for their photographic series Queer Portraits, Alone Time, and Switch. Queer Portraits is a photography monograph of portraits featuring Levine's family and friends in different domestic settings over the years 2006–2015. The portraits were taken in selected and arranged settings with studio lighting. The use of saturated colors and textures gives clues as to the character of the subjects, who are photographed with a neutral expression. Subsequent works in a similar style include Family (2016) and Intimates (2018).

Alone Time is a series of photographs with the same model depicting both the female and male members of a couple. Levine says of this series:

By demonstrating an individual body’s capacity to engagingly and believably embody two genders, my project questions the mainstream depiction of binary gender roles. This conceptual decision to double the gender presentation of a single body challenges normative ideas surrounding gender presentation and instead implies that gender expression can be fluid and multiple.

Switch is a series of diptychs, each depicting the same two models, but with opposite gender presentations in each photograph. For Switch and Alone Time, each model's gender presentation was depicted based on costuming, makeup, and posing, without any digital manipulation except for compositing the images.

Levine only works with personal acquaintances, normally in their own homes. According to Levine, his images are intended to, "celebrate marginality from a place of familiarity and self-exploration as opposed to voyeurism". Of Alone Time, Levine said, "by demonstrating an individual body's capacity to engagingly and believably embody two genders, my project questions the mainstream depiction of binary gender roles". Levine shoots on film.

Levine has received grants from the Canada Council for the Arts and the Conseil des arts et des lettres du Québec.

== Personal life ==
Levine is transgender. He began photography as a child when his mother, a documentary filmmaker, gave him a camera. Levine completed a Bachelor of Fine Arts in Photography and Interdisciplinary Studies in Sexuality from Concordia University, and a Master of Fine Arts at Concordia University in 2018.
