= Russell G. Juriansz =

Canadian judge

Russell Gordon Juriansz (born 1946) is a Canadian jurist who served as a justice of the Court of Appeal for Ontario. Juriansz was born in 1946 in Kirkee (Khadki), Maharashta, and came to Canada with his family in 1955. He received a BS from the University of Toronto in 1969 and graduated from Osgoode Hall Law School in 1972. Juriansz was appointed to the Ontario Superior Court of Justice in 1998. He was appointed to the Court of Appeal in March 2004 and retired on August 30, 2021.
