= Andrew Princz =

Andrew Princz (October 28, 1970 – June 24, 2011) was a journalist, editor, and publisher of ontheglobe.com. He has done reporting from around the globe, visiting almost sixty countries conducting tourism promotion and country awareness projects, spearheading the concept of cultural navigation, a form of modern-day global exploration whereby the traveler takes an empathetic approach to the cultures that he comes across. He has contributed to CNN Traveller, The Wall Street Journal, The Toronto Star, CBC.ca, The Montreal Gazette, the Chinese monthly Cultural Geographic, The Art Newspaper, and ARTnews. Princz was founding editor of the Budapest-based monthly DT - Diplomacy and Trade.

He was the holder of a BFA in Art History from Concordia University. Princz had contributed to several of Frommer's Eastern European guidebooks, and was the lead author of Bridging the Divide: Canadian and Hungarian Stories of the 1956 Revolution, a book about the Hungarian Revolution of 1956.

On June 24, 2011, Princz died from a heart attack while in Quito, Ecuador.

== Works ==
- Frommer's Budapest & the Best of Hungary ISBN 978-0-471-77819-6 (John Wiley & Sons; 2006)
- Frommer's Eastern Europe ISBN 978-0-470-08958-3 (John Wiley & Sons; 2007)
- Frommer's Europe by Rail ISBN 978-0-7645-9951-4 (John Wiley & Sons; 2006)
- Frommer's Europe ISBN 978-0-471-92265-0 (John Wiley & Sons; 2006)
- Bridging the Divide: Canadian and Hungarian Stories of the 1956 Revolution ISBN 978-0-9781612-0-0 (ontheglobe.com, 2006)
