= Christina Stojanova =

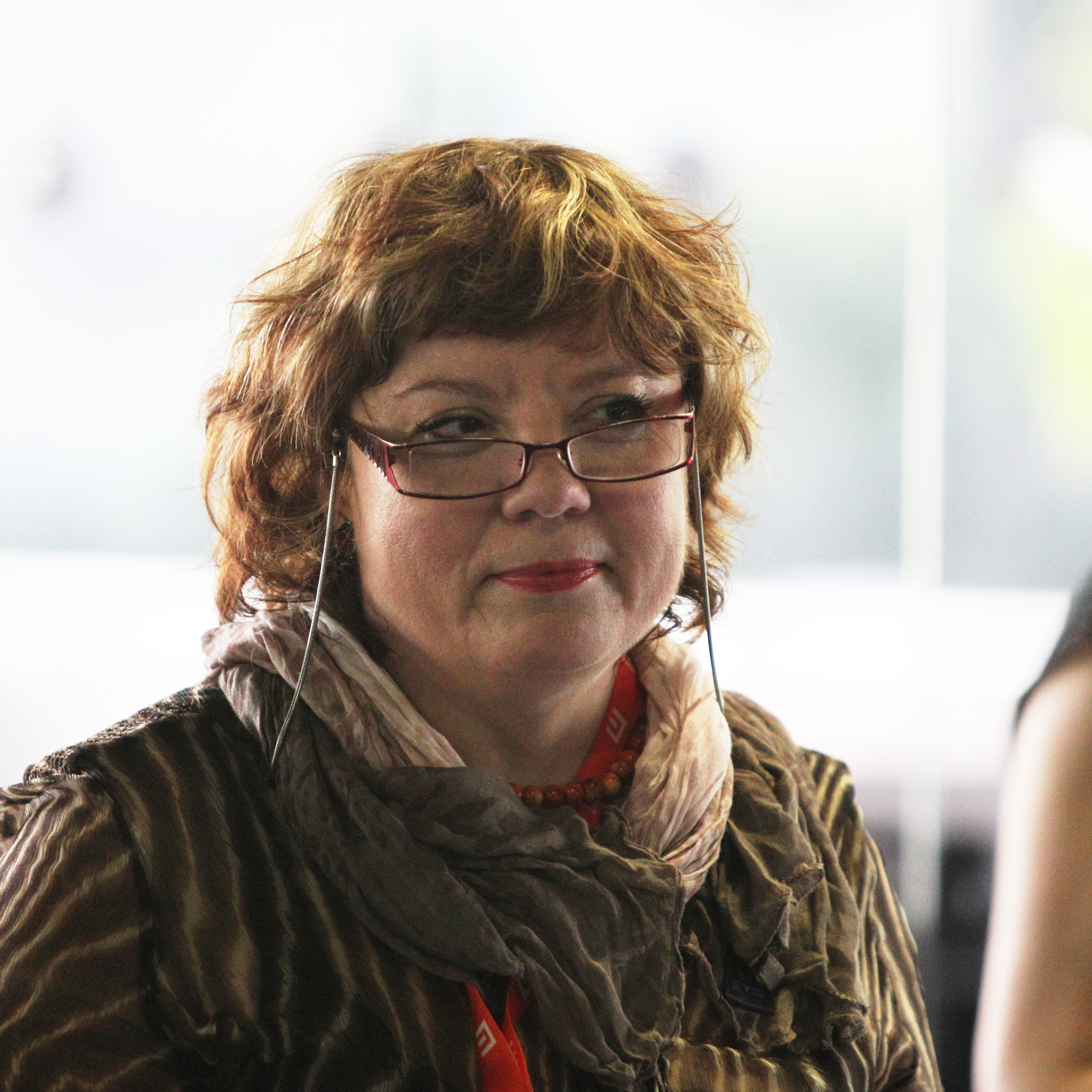
- Stojanova at 45th KVIFF (2010)
- Known for: Media history
- Awards: Queen Elizabeth II Diamond Jubilee Medal, Silver Medal from the Bulgarian Ministry of Culture

Christina Stojanova is a Canadian media historian and faculty member at the University of Regina. Her work focuses on cultural semiotics in Canadian multicultural cinema, Central and Eastern European media and cinema, inter-war German cinema, and on the works of Jean-Luc Godard.

== Career ==
She received a Bachelor of Arts in Film and Theatre Studies at the Sofia State Academy for Theatre and Film, in Bulgaria in 1980. In 1982 she received a MFA in Film and Theatre Studies from the same institution. In 1999 she completed a PhD in the Interdisciplinary Doctoral Program in Humanities at Concordia University.

The work of Stojanova is mainly focused on Canadian multicultural cinema, Eastern European cinema and German cinema during the war. She also focuses on topics like theories of propaganda, cinema globalization and the phenomenon of mysticism. As an expert consultant in academic area, she has been recognized internationally. Her work has appeared in Kinema.

She has been teaching as an Associate Professor in the Department of Film at the University of Regina since 2006. She has published several books on the history of cinema. In 2011, her co-edited book with Béla Szabados titled Wittgenstein at the Movies: Cinematic Investigations was published by Lexington Books. In 2013 she published a book titled The Legacies of Jean-Luc Godard (WLU Press) along with Douglas Morrey and Nicole Cote.

In 2016, she curated "The Caligari Project" film series.

== Selected works ==
- Christina Stojanova, Dana Duma, The New Romanian Cinema. Edinburgh University Press, 2019
- Béla Szabados; Christina Stojanova, eds. (24 March 2011). Wittgenstein at the Movies: Cinematic Investigations. Lexington Books. pp. 7–. ISBN 978-0-7391-4887-7.
- Berlin "Culturescapes" (U of T Press, 2008),
- "Making it Like a Man: Canadian Masculinities" (Wilfrid Laurier U Press, 2008),
- "Eastern European Cinema" (Routledge, USA, 2006),
- "Traditions in World Cinema" (Edinburgh U Press, UK, 2006)
- Double Vision: Eastern European Cinema, 1948-1989: The Official Story, KINO, the Russian Cinema Series, I. B. Tauris, Limited, 2005, ISBN 9781860647840
- "Horror International" (Wayne U Press, USA, 2005)
- "Alternative Europe" (Wallflower, UK, 2004)
- "Cinema and Globalization" (Editura Victor, Romania, 2003).
- 2013. The Legacies of Jean-Luc Godard (Co-edited with Douglas Morrey, U of Warwick, UK, and Nicole Cote, U of Sherbrooke. WLU Press, Canada, 250 pages).

== Awards ==
In 2006, Stojanova received the Diploma and Silver Medal from the Bulgarian Ministry of Culture. She was a recipient of the Queen Elizabeth II Diamond Jubilee Medal in 2012.
