= Maxyne Finkelstein =

Maxyne Finkelstein is a non-profit professional who is President of the Morris and Rosalind Goodman Family Foundation, based in Montreal, Canada. Her previous professional positions included Chief of Staff of the Genesis Prize, Chief Operating Officer of Taglit Birthright Israel, and chief executive officer of the Jewish Agency for Israel, North America, among other top level positions in the global Jewish community.

== Early life ==
Maxyne Finkelstein spent her early years in Montreal, Quebec. She was educated at York University and Concordia University. She also earned a Masters of Science Degree in Mediation and Conflict Resolution at Champlain College (Burlington, Vermont). Following her education in political science and public administration she decided to pursue a career in Jewish communal service as a result of learning about the plight of Jewish prisoners of conscience. Her first positions were within the Jewish Federation structure in Montreal and later in Toronto as the CEO of Jewish Federations Canada, UIA.

== JAFI ==
Working as first CEO at the Jewish Agency for Israel, North America from New York for five years, Finkelstein was responsible for leading the organization's fund raising efforts in North America and was the manager of the delegation of over 1000 Israelis who were emissaries in the United States and Canada during this period. Finkelstein then was the Chief Operating Officer of the Birthright Israel Foundation, managing the fundraising of over $70 million annually for the largest global experiential program for young Jewish adults.

== Genesis Prize ==
In 2013, Finkelstein was named as Chief of Staff of the Genesis Prize Foundation, which is a $1 million annual award in cooperation with the Israeli Government and the Jewish Agency for Israel. In this role she was instrumental in developing the process for selecting the Prize Laureates and managing how the $1 million Award would be dedicated.

== Morris and Rosalind Goodman Family Foundation ==
In 2017 Finkelstein was asked to be the first professional President of The Morris and Rosalind Goodman Family Foundation a Canadian-based private charitable entity. The Foundation is one of the larger Canadian Family Foundations and primarily supports initiatives in the fields of scientific research, education and quality of life with a focus on capacity building in non profit organizations. The Foundation Board is Chaired by Shawna Goodman Sone and includes representatives of all family branches as well as an external member.
