= Onye Nnorom =

Canadian physician, public health leader (born 1981)

Onyenyechukwu Nnorom
- Born: February 27, 1981 (age 45); Montreal, Quebec, Canada
- Education: McGill University; Concordia University; University of Toronto
- Scientific career
- Workplaces: University of Toronto

Dr. Onyenyechukwu (Onye) Nnorom is a Canadian physician, public health leader, and health equity advocate. She is the associate chief medical officer of Health for the province of Ontario, with a portfolio focused on health equity, with a special focus on Black health. A family physician and public health and preventive medicine specialist, she is also an assistant professor at the University of Toronto, appointed to the Department of Family and Community Medicine (DFCM) and cross-appointed at the Dalla Lana School of Public Health (DLSPH).

== Early life and education ==
Nnorom was born in Montreal, Quebec. Her mother migrated to Canada from Trinidad and Tobago and her father migrated from Nigeria. Her father worked as a maintenance worker and her mother was a personal support worker. Nnorom took part in a summer camp for gifted students, during which she became interested in science.

Nnorom attended Concordia University, where she completed a bachelor's degree in molecular biology. In the second year of her degree, she was mentored by a physician, Dr. Eric Laryea, who was leading a program to recruit more Black medical students. Nnorom eventually applied to study medicine at McGill University, where she focused on the social determinants of health, graduating in 2007. During her time at McGill she volunteered with the YMCA, helping refugees access health services. She completed a master's degree in public health at the University of Toronto and completed her residency training at St. Michael's Hospital. Her residency training included family medicine and a residency in public health and preventive medicine. Hence, Dr. Nnorom is both certified as a family doctor and as a medical specialist in Canada, where holding dual certifications is uncommon.

== Personal life ==
Nnorom has two sons, Jaden and Elias. They live in Toronto, Canada.

== Career ==
Dr. Nnorom has held numerous academic, clinical and public health leadership roles. Upon graduating, Nnorom worked in various community health centres around Thunder Bay and Toronto, including the Women’s Health in Women’s Hands Community Health Centre and NorWest Community Health Centre. She then joined the TAIBU Community Health Centre as a Family Physician and chronic Disease Prevention Lead. In 2013, she was made Associate Program Director at the Dalla Lana School of Public Health for the Public Health and Preventative Medicine Residency Program. From 2016 to 2023, she was the Black Health Theme Lead in the University of Toronto’s MD Program. She was the first to hold such a position in Canada, teaching about Black health in the medical curriculum.

She then served as Senior Medical Consultant in the Office of the Chief Medical Officer of Health and was the inaugural Equity, Diversity, and Inclusion Lead at the DFCM.

She currently serves as the Black Health Faculty Lead at the DFCM and is a Clinical Consultant at the Nicotine Dependence Clinic at the Centre for Addiction and Mental Health. She is currently an Associate Chief Medical Officer of Health for Ontario, where she leads initiatives to address health equity, including Black Health.

== Leadership and advocacy ==
Nnorom is the co-founder of the Black Health Education Collaborative (BHEC), a national organization advancing anti-racist health education. BHEC developed Canada’s first national accredited curriculum on Black Health, available in both French and English. The Black Health Primer is an online resource, consisting of several modules aimed at medical students and health professionals, to provide information and resources on Black health and inequities in the Canadian healthcare system. Other healthcare professionals involved in the Collaborative include Dr. OmiSoore Dryden, Dr. Delia Douglas, Sume Ndumbe-Eyoh, Dr. Barbara Hamilton-Hinch, and Dr. Gaynor Watson-Creed. Under Dr. Nnorom's leadership, BHEC also collaborated with the Medical Council of Canada to incorporate Black Health into physician licensing exams. She also advocated for, provided direction, and collaborated with the Canadian Medical Association Journal to ensure the publication of the journal’s first Black Health Special Series, amplifying Black scholars and addressing barriers in academic publishing.

She previously served as President of the Black Physicians’ Association of Ontario (BPAO) In 2021, under Nnorom's leadership and in partnership with the Black Scientists’ Task Force on Vaccine Equity in Toronto and the Black Health Alliance, the Black Physicians' Association of Ontario launched the Black Health Vaccine Initiative, an effort aimed at providing culturally safe vaccine clinics to Black and other marginalized communities across the province. During her time as president, the BPAO released several position statements on racism in healthcare.

== Research and publications ==
Dr. Nnorom’s research focuses on Black population health, racism as a social determinant of health, cancer screening equity, and medical education. Her work includes:

- Dying to Learn: A Scoping Review of Breast and Cervical Cancer Studies Focusing on Black Canadian Women (2019)
- Time to Dismantle Systemic Anti-Black Racism in Medicine in Canada (2021), cited over 150 times
- Afrocentric Screening Program for Breast, Colorectal, and Cervical Cancer among Immigrant Patients (2021)
- Increasing SARS-CoV-2 Vaccination Rates among Black People in Canada (2021)

== Awards and recognition ==
Nnorom has received numerous accolades, including:

- Black Leaders in Health Award (2025, Dalla Lana School of Public Health)
- Community Healer Award (2024, Black Health Professionals Network)
- 100 Accomplished Black Canadian Women (2022)
- TD Spotlight on Achievement Award (2022)
- Government of Canada Noteworthy Black Canadian Figure (2023)
- 2019 Honouree, Women of Purpose Awards
- 2020 Best Health Magazine's Women of the Year

She has also earned multiple teaching awards from the University of Toronto and its MD Program.

== Selected publications ==
- "Correction to "Time to dismantle systemic anti-Black racism in medicine in Canada"". Canadian Medical Association Journal. 193 (7): E253. 2021-02-15. doi:10.1503/cmaj.210163. ISSN 0820-3946. PMC 8034335. PMID 33593960.
- Nnorom, Onye; Findlay, Nicole; Lee-Foon, Nakia K; Jain, Ankur A; Ziegler, Carolyn P; Scott, Fran E; Rodney, Patricia; Lofters, Aisha K (2019). "Dying to Learn: A Scoping Review of Breast and Cervical Cancer Studies Focusing on Black Canadian Women". Journal of Health Care for the Poor and Underserved. 30 (4): 1331–1359. doi:10.1353/hpu.2019.0100. ISSN 1548-6869. PMID 31680101.
- Mpalirwa, Joseph; Lofters, Aisha; Nnorom, Onye; Hanson, Mark D. (2020-10-27). "Patients, Pride, and Prejudice: Exploring Black Ontarian Physicians' Experiences of Racism and Discrimination". Academic Medicine. 95 (11S): S51–S57. doi:10.1097/acm.0000000000003648. ISSN 1040-2446. PMID 32769450.

== Media and public engagement ==
Dr. Onye Nnorom (often referred to as "Dr. O.") is a frequent media commentator and public speaker on health equity, appearing on CBC, CTV, Global News, TVO, The Globe and Mail, The Marilyn Dennis Show, and The Social. She hosted the podcast Race, Health & Happiness (2020–2023), which spotlighted the experiences of racialized professionals and discussed the impact of institutional racism on societal health Dr. Nnorom currently hosts Healthcaring Differently, a platform inspiring diverse youth to pursue careers in healthcare.
