= Myrna Lashley =

Canadian psychologist and professor

Myrna Eunilda Lashley C.M.
- Born: 1945 (age 80–81); Barbados
- Occupations: Psychologist, professor, consultant
- Employer: McGill University
- Known for: Advocacy against racial profiling, cultural psychology, mental health research
- Title: Associate Professor, Department of Psychiatry, McGill University
- Awards: Order of Canada (2024); Martin Luther King Legacy Award (2004); Friends of Simon Wiesenthal Award for Holocaust Studies (2006); Queen Elizabeth II Diamond Jubilee Award (2012)

Academic background
- Education: Concordia University (BA 1984); McGill University (PhD)

Dr. Myrna Eunilda Lashley CC (1945–) is an associate professor in the Department of Psychiatry at McGill University and an adjunct researcher at Jewish General Hospital. She holds a doctorate in counseling psychology from McGill University.

== Biography ==
Lashley grew up in Barbados and moved to Montreal at age 12. She served in the Royal Canadian Navy and faced discrimination while serving, including being told to leave a beach in the United States because it was for white people and being denied housing off a military base in Nova Scotia because of her skin colour. She took the matter to court and won her case against the government.

== Career ==
Lashley began her career in clinical psychology. She transitioned to bringing about systemic change after realizing that treating individuals affected by racism without addressing the underlying systems was not enough. For more than 30 years, she's worked at the community level to address racism while also trying to change policies that spread this harm.

Her work looks at how racism and life experiences affect the mental health of Black youth in Canada, including challenges in schools and health care, and the need for services that better understand their experiences.

In 2018, Lashley was chosen as the English spokesperson for Black History Month in Montreal in recognition of her work on racial profiling and her leadership in the Black community. She has served on the city's committee for its public consultation into systemic racism and discrimination.

She has spoken about her emotions regarding racism, from anger at being the first Black person in many roles to sadness that she is still fighting for recognition of systemic racism. She has noted a desire for change, with senior officials now attending her workshops, and she remains optimistic because she can see progress from where she started. She has said that the only way to fight evil is with love, and that anger cannot be fought with anger.

She has authored training manuals on intercultural issues and received awards including the Friends of Simon Wiesenthal Award for Holocaust studies, the Martin Luther King legacy award, and a merit award from the Kahnawake Native survival school. She is Honorary Consul of Barbados to Montreal. Her research interests include cultural aspects of youth mental health and radicalization leading to violence.

== Recognition ==
In 2024, she was appointed as a Member of the Order of Canada. The citation recognized her as an important advocate against racial profiling, an internationally recognized authority on cultural psychology and mental health, and a contributor to policies and interventions that promote equity, inclusivity, and cultural sensitivity. She was invested on 25 June 2026.
