= William P. Byers =

Canadian mathematician and philosopher

William Paul Byers (born 1943) is a Canadian mathematician and philosopher; professor emeritus in mathematics and statistics at Concordia University in Montreal, Quebec, Canada.

He completed a BSc ('64), and an MSc ('65) from McGill University, and obtained his PhD ('69) from the University of California, Berkeley. His dissertation, Anosov Flows, was supervised by Stephen Smale.

His area of interests include dynamical systems and the philosophy of mathematics.

== Books ==
Byers is the author of three books on mathematics:

- How Mathematicians Think: Using Ambiguity, Contradiction, and Paradox to Create Mathematics (Princeton University Press, 2007)
- The Blind Spot: Science and the Crisis of Uncertainty (Princeton University Press, 2011)
- Deep Thinking: What Mathematics Can Teach Us About the Mind (World Scientific, 2015)

== See also ==
- List of people from Montreal
