= Warren Cohen (composer) =

Canadian musician

- Born: Montreal, Quebec, Canada
- Occupations: composer, conductor and pianist

Warren Cohen is a Canadian composer, conductor and pianist is the musical director of the MusicaNova Orchestra, based in Scottsdale, Arizona, which is identified by its mission statement ('musica nova' means 'new music'), rather than a geographical location. The organisation specialises in works that are newly composed or unjustly neglected, as well as new interpretations of standard repertoire.

Cohen, who has so far had a two-decade career as a musical director, and who has significantly developed every organisation with which he has been involved, studied conducting with Gustave Meier and Paul Vermel.

== Biography ==
Born in Montreal, Cohen studied piano with his father, Philip Cohen, and composition privately. Cohen performed frequently as a solo pianist from 1980 to 1990 by performing over 200 works including 20 world premiere performances. At the time, he was living in Hawaii, and held the position of music director of the Kumu Kahua Theatre Group, which specialised in locally-themed productions. He composed music for numerous theatre productions, including ones based on the life of Princess Ka'iulani and the Aristophanes farce Ecclesiazusae (translated as either "Women in Parliament" or "The Congresswomen").

Meanwhile, Cohen also worked as a ballet accompanist and as an accompanist to singers. The last skill led to him being asked to conduct the orchestra for a production of the (appropriately) obscure musical "Here's Love" by Meredith Willson in 1990. He was then in great demand to conduct many other productions and concert works. Cohen spent the 1991–1992 season in England in creating a self-study program by attending rehearsals at English National Opera and asking a lot of questions of Mark Elder, who was the music director. Returning to Hawaii in 1992, he worked more in Symphonic and Concert repertoire in addition to his continuing work in theatre productions. He was the conductor of the revamped Hawaii Chamber Orchestra in the 1994–1995 season before he left for England in 1995. He was appointed music director of the Southern Arizona Symphony Orchestra in Tucson in 1996, a position he held until 2005, and has lived in Arizona since then. The integrated MusicaNova concept took shape after his appointment as music director of the Fine Arts String Orchestra in Phoenix in 2001. He became the music director of MusicaNova in 2003 and the MusicaNova Baroque Orchestra in 2004.

During the late 1990s and early years of the 21st century, Cohen played a significant role in the resurgence of interest in the British composer Richard Arnell by conducting several of his symphonies in concert and by recording all of them for imminent commercial release. The first coupling, of Symphonies 4 and 5, was made available on the Con Brio Label in March 2008.

Cohen's talent and inventiveness as both a composer and a conductor has been recognized with 7 ASCAP awards for original composition and a 1999 ASCAP/American Symphony Orchestra League's Award for Adventurous Programming. He has conducted nearly 1000 works over the past ten seasons, with scores of regional and world premieres. Cohen continues to compose, mostly for orchestra in recent years. His compositions include three Concerto Grossos, the most recent featuring a battalion of flute soloists. His Sonata for Flute, Bassoon and String Quartet was premiered by Arpeggio in Scottsdale, Arizona, in January 2008.

In close contact with Benjamin Korstvedt, Cohen has with the MusicaNova Orchestra performed the world premiere of the 1878 version of Bruckner's Symphony No. 4 on 1 May 2022.

== See also ==
- Music of Canada
- List of Canadian composers
