= Webster Library =

Webster Library may refer to:

- Webster Public Library, New York
- Webster Groves Public Library, Missouri
- Webster House, part of the Schenectady Public Library at Union College, New York
- Webster Library, part of the Cummings School of Veterinary Medicine at Tufts College, Massachusetts
- R. Howard Webster Library, part of the Concordia University Libraries in Quebec, Canada
