= J.W. McConnell Building =

Building in Montreal, Canada

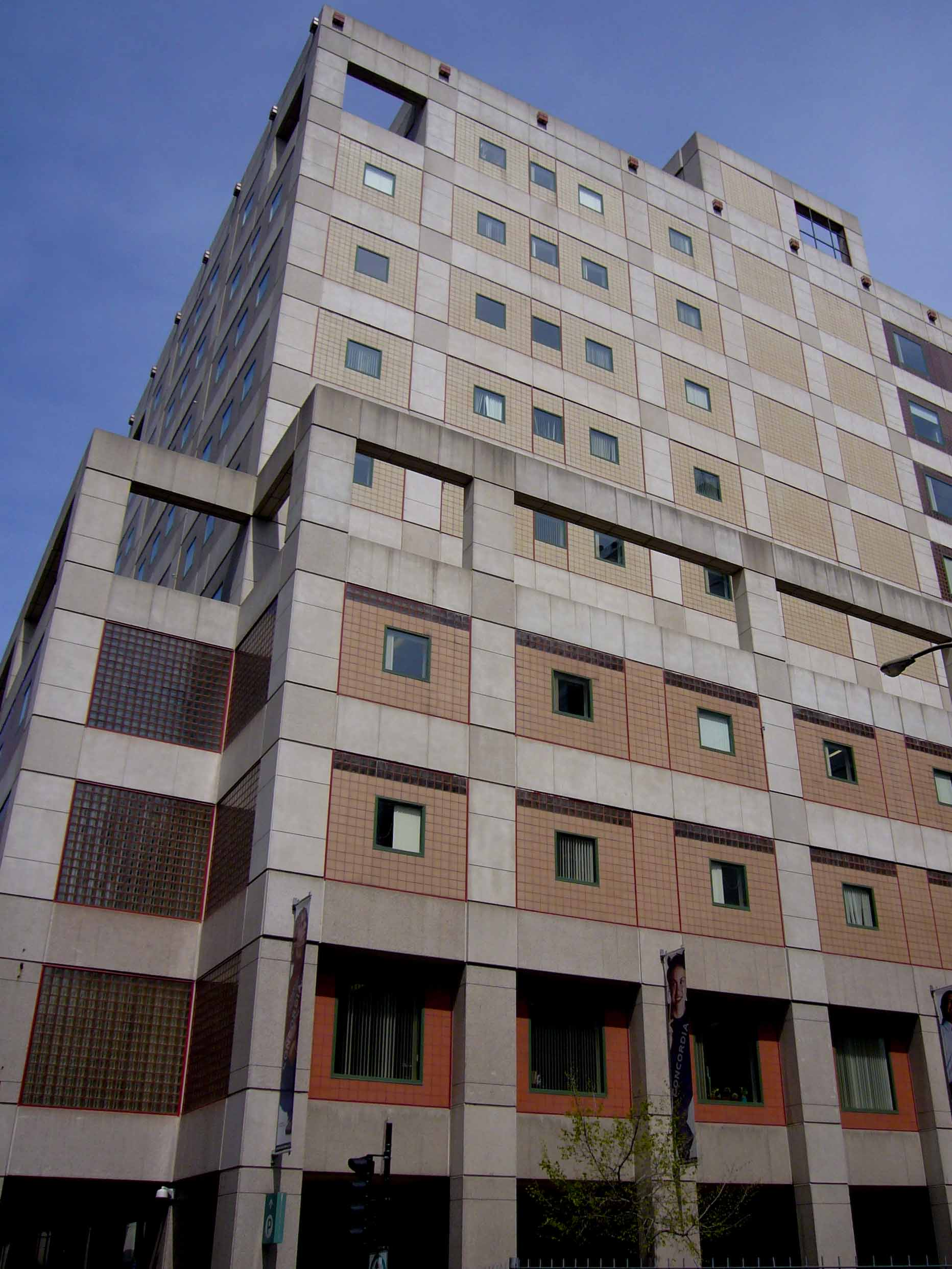
- The J.W. McConnell building seen from de Maisonneuve Blvd.

General information
- Location: 1400 de Maisonneuve Boulevard West, Montreal, Quebec, Canada
- Coordinates: 45.4969401°N 73.5783425°W
- Named for: J.W. McConnell
- Completed: 1992
- Opened: September 30, 1992
- Cost: $27.5 million CAD
- Owner: Concordia University

Technical details
- Floor count: 10

Website
- concordia.ca

The J.W. McConnell Building is an academic building on the Sir George Williams campus of Concordia University in Montreal, Quebec. Built in 1992, it is named for John Wilson McConnell, a Canadian businessman and philanthropist whose foundation contributed to the building's erection. It sits between Bishop Street and Mackay Street on De Maisonneuve Boulevard in the Quartier Concordia. It is the home of the R. Howard Webster Library, the Departments of Education, English, Études Français, History, and Mathematics & Statistics. It is also home to the Leonard and Bina Ellen Art Gallery, the J.A. DeSève Cinema, the Birks Student Centre and Welcome Centre, as well as many other services such as the Campus Bookstore and Print Services.

== Architecture ==
Shortly after its completion, the C$65 million building was criticized as "one of ugliest, most offensive new structures to be erected in Montreal since post-modernist architecture came into its prime." McGill University professor of architecture David Theodore wrote in 2000 that "Concordia's last major project was the 1992 J.W. McConnell building on de Maisonneuve Blvd., which houses the Webster library. Meant to be the heart of the downtown campus, it has been severely criticized; for example, for the clumsy incorporation of the terra cotta facade of the Royal George Apartments on Bishop St."

The Northeast side of the building's comprises the facade of the Royal George Apartments, which were built in 1912 and bought by Concordia in 1979. The facade has unique architectural significance because it is made of white glazed terra-cotta, an unusual building material in Montreal.
