= Overdale =

- Neighbourhood
- Location of Overdale in Montreal
- Coordinates: 45.494872°N 73.573122°W
- Country: Canada
- Province: Quebec
- City: Montreal
- Borough: Ville-Marie
- Postal Code: H3G
- Area codes: 514, 438

Overdale was a small residential district in downtown Montreal that became a famous symbol of the struggle between urban conservationists and land developers.

In the mid-1980s, two developers, Robert Landau and Douglas Cohen, operating under an array of names, including Les Galleria Dorchester and Grinch Realties, purchased a series of buildings in an area bounded by Overdale Avenue, Lucien L'Allier Street, Mackay Street and Dorchester Boulevard (Dorchester was renamed as René Lévesque Boulevard in 1987). The developers proposed to demolish all of the homes and replace them with a large condo project.

The Executive Committee of Montreal, headed by Mayor Jean Doré, was split on the issue. Doré had risen to power through the Montreal Citizens' Movement (known in French as the Rassemblement des citoyens et des citoyennes de Montréal, or RCM). The MCM had considered the defense of tenants' rights to be among its primary goals. Doré had promised to change the demolitionist ways of his predecessor, Mayor Jean Drapeau, but when developers promised a project that would yield significant municipal tax dollars, Doré decided to allow the project to evict the tenants of the homes and demolish buildings that housed 87 residents. The buildings to be demolished included many fine, Victorian-era structures as well as the onetime home of Louis Hippolyte Lafontaine. Tenants and experts argued that the terrain was large enough to allow for the construction of the new project alongside the existing structures, yet the appeals were rejected.

City inspectors condemned the buildings as electrical hazards. The tenants were ordered out, saving the landlords the inconvenience of negotiating the departure of each individual tenant. In spite of protests and arrests and considerable public reaction in opposition to the planned project and the methods employed to evict the tenants, the buildings, except for the onetime home of Lafontaine, were demolished in 1989.

The promised $100-million condominium development was not built for decades and remained a parking lot until 2015, when construction started.

The developers paid the city to build a separate building farther from downtown which would be offered to the evicted tenants. The rents were much higher at the new development. The Overdale-area residents were invited to move to the new project, but most refused.

== Timeline ==
This is a chronological summary of the events that involved in the Overdale controversy, based on the notes of architect Michael Fish.

=== 1986 ===
Summer: The Doria Corporation, owner of all the residential properties on the block (Mackay, Dorchester, Lucien-L’Allier, Overdale) applies for demolition permits for all of the housing on the block. There are 75 apartments and studio-rooms within a greystone rooming house, a three-storey apartment building, four triplexes, a mansion converted into apartments and 7 grey stone former grand homes converted into apartments. The average space in all units is 48 sq. m. The Canadian census tract covering this block of houses notes that the median income of the households is $8,000 per annum. The next lowest census tract on the island covers the Dozois project where the median income is $11,000 per annum.

Fall: The City Executive under Mayor Drapeau decides to refuse permission to demolish any buildings. The decision of the Executive Committee notes that all the buildings have been inspected by city experts who that all of the buildings are in good condition. Furthermore, experts representing the province who have also looked at the proposal to demolish them state that all of the buildings have a certain heritage value, that they are feasible to renovate, where desired, at economic cost, that they can be easily integrated into any further development and recommends that the city conserve all the buildings. Residents protest in November.

Winter: Cohen and Landau, having purchased the nonresidential and vacant property on the block, buy all the residential property to become the sole proprietor of the block. There are some 13000 sq meters of land on the whole block. They attest to having paid $11,000,000 for the whole block. Together with a source close to the Doré group, Cameron Charlebois, Cohen and Landau ask the newly elected executive committee member, John Gardiner, for rezonings on the block for a massive redevelopment. Gardiner agrees to allow Cohen and Landau to build two new small apartment buildings, to be owned by the city, on a cost-plus basis on some vacant city owned land a few blocks away. The land is valued at $235,000.

The developers offer in kind up to $1.1 million toward their construction cost over any mortgages negotiated for them. They pledge up to $135,000 to help pay rental subsidies to the residents when and if they move. The city agree to pay all mortgages of these buildings estimated to amount to at least $1.25 million, and contribute temporary subsidies to the rents for displaced residents of up to $135,000. The total city contribution to the developers is valued at: land, $235,000; rent subsidies, $135,000; and mortgage guarantee, at least $1.25 million; streets and lanes, $207,000; and a plus value to the site of $1.88 million, totalling at least $3.7 million. Cohen and Landau pledge up to $1.1 million for the cost of the new buildings and $135,000 toward rental subsidies if residents move to the new buildings. The total is a maximum of $1.24 million. There will be 67 rooms and apartments in the new buildings replacing the 75 existing rooms and apartments in the existing buildings.

=== 1987 ===
June: Gardiner announces Cohen and Landau's proposal for development and the "generous gesture" of developers to replace the demolished homes. He claims a "first" in the "protection" of the resident-tenants by the city. Gardiner starts negotiations with the Overdale residents on behalf of the developers to get them to move quickly to the new buildings. He promises Councillor Arnold Bennett and other housing activists close to his municipal party that rents will not rise in the new buildings from the low levels in the Overdale buildings.

July: Residents point out that the rents offered to most of them are 40% higher in the new buildings and that the subsidies slide down to nothing in the fourth year. The residents become divided among themselves under heavy continuous pressure from their landlords, city officials, lobbyists, and the media. Elderly poor residents of the rooming house agree to the proposal to move, and a few other older and sick residents leave the area to avoid the stress of a protracted fight. Some residents feel that the temporary rental subsidies offered to everyone can be improve, and even made permanent. They continue to negotiate unsuccessfully with Gardiner. Public comment in major media, newspapers, radio, and television go strongly, even rabidly against the residents in support of the vity and the developers. The local city councillor, and Montreal Gazette columnist, Nick Auf der Maur, writes an article for the Montreal Daily News attacking the residents as greedy. The article is reprinted in the Gazette as a paid advertisement.

Architect Michael Fish is asked by the residents to study the possibility of staying in their homes, purchasing them for their market worth and helping increase the profitability of the developers plans. One home is found by Senator Serge Joyal to be the former home of Louis Hippolyte-Lafontaine, an important Patriot during the 1837-38 Rebellion. The historic value of the building is enhanced by the facts that Lafontaine later served as the first prime minister of the United Canadas from 1848 to 1851. Nevertheless, demolition application notices are put up on all buildings. Several appeals to the Commission d'arbitrage against demolition are launched. Cohen and Landau withdraw the application to demolish the Lafontaine house "provided it is proved that it is indeed the house of Lafontaine."

August: Negotiations between the residents and the City continue. Transition funds (damages owed under the rental code) to those who agree to leave quickly are slowly negotiated up to $3,000 per apartment tenant and $1,400 per roomer to leave quickly. Few residents take the money. Public hearings are announced. The City Executive Committee announces their own revised intention to preserve four buildings on MacKay Street, the Lafontaine house and four triplexes on Overdale Street. It will allow the demolition of the Kinkora-Cadillac Apts and all the greystone houses on Kinkora Avenue. The hearings open for two evenings before a committee of City Councillors.

September: A report of the City Council Committee recommends saving of all the buildings and the "integration of residents into the condo development," with a smaller scale new building to take certain residents who would not be part of a coop on the site. Only Councillor Nick Auf der Maur dissents, calling the report by the Committee "crazy." The City Council votes against the almost-unanimous report of its own committee and accepts the development plan worked out by Gardiner. Four councillors vote against the majority of the city council. Several others abstain, including the powerful chairman of the committee, Councillor André Lavallée. Several councillors in the Doré party sit from then on as independents.

October: The residents demonstrate for the first time against the council's decision and ask questions at city council. Residents will come to almost every council meeting during the next months to demonstrate and to ask for changes to keep them in their homes.

November: Residents demonstrate at the MCM convention. Delegates vote to maintain the program of the party, which calls for the integration of buildings and residents into new developments except when such is cost prohibitive. The City Executive Committee directs its Heritage Committee to cite as a historic monument the Lafontaine house and its immediate grey Ssone triplex neighbour, originally built as an extension to the Lafontaine house. The Heritage Committee holds hearings. Objections by the architects of the development, represented by architect Panzini are sustained by the committee. Only the Lafontaine house is cited by the city as cultural property.

=== 1988 ===
January 13: Hearings open before the Commission d'arbitrage sur la démolition du patrimoine résidentiel de Montreal to decide the question of whether the Kinkora-Cadillac apartments and the Kinkora St. greystone buildings are to be demolished.

March 16: A Superior Court Judge orders work stopped for a period of 10 days while the issue can be sorted out.

April: Cohen and Landau are issued permits by the city to convert all buildings that will be ordered preserved by the Commission d'arbitrage from residences to commercial and offices. The tactic allows residents to be legally removed from all buildings immediately, even those that will be ordered conserved. The permission documents note that the Lafontaine house, with its stone extension, and the Mackay Street row will become a community centre with a fitness club and offices. Such permits usually take months to approve. These are approved in nine days. Intense demolition work starts immediately on vacant buildings and in vacant apartments despite that some tenants have valid leases to occupy their apartments. Six more residents or supporters are arrested and jailed for a day for blocking workers from this work. They will ultimately be criminalized. An injunction is obtained by the residents from Superior Court to stop this work. Mayor Doré calls the work "premature and provocative."

May: The Commission d'Arbitrage decides to recommend approving all the demolitions applied for. The federal Minister of housing, McInnes announces a 100% increase in the number of very low income residents who can live in a nonprofit co-op. The feasibility of a co-op on the Overdale site is improved allowing for an increase in the offer to Cohen and Landau. Superior Court hearings start for a permanent injunction requested by the residents to set the conversion permits aside on the grounds that the zoning bylaw that calls for only residences on the block is being contravened by the issue of commercial permits. Faults in the permit drawings and processes are alleged. Residents form a nonprofit co-op and apply for a charter from the province.

June: The coop offers $700,000 for the buildings again, almost twice what was paid for their value as condos by Landau and Cohen, leaving the surplus land development rights for the whole block. Since the buildings will be demolished by the developers, this is a land transaction that an intelligent developer could not turn down. However it is refused. A letter written by the mayor and Gardiner supports the co-op application to senior governments as a part of the condo development.

June 14: The city fire department orders an evacuation of the buildings on MacKay Street and of the Kinkora-Cadillac Apartments, citing minor dangerous conditions of the buildings.

June 21: Mayor Doré refuses to try to persuade the developers to sell their homes to the co-op. He defends the arrangements as they are.

June 22: The residents are refused permits to correct the "dangerous conditions" in the buildings on their own at their own cost.

June 27: Remaining residents of the condemned buildings barricade themselves into their apartments.

June 28: Six more residents and their supporters are arrested by the police for blocking city movers from the buildings and are evacuated force. Thirteen residents are arrested and jailed overnight in an all-morning police operation involving the riot squad, the SWAT team, and a platoon of 20 to 30 police to empty the buildings. A later trial orders several residents and sentences them to stay away from all demonstrations for two years.

June 29: Mayor Doré defends the use of force against the residents.

July: Residents continue to try to persuade Landau, Cohen, and Doré to sell their home for a 100% profit to their co-op as part of the condo development. In the meantime, developers have $3.7 million in city donated benefits for $1.6 million in developer concessions to a publicly owned project open only to middle class tenancy.

September: The following buildings are demolished. All that remain are three facades on Mackay Street, the Lafontaine house, its grey stone extension, and three brick triplexes fronting on Overdale. All have been gutted for offices that never materialize, the whole of the rest of the city block is covered with gravel, and a parking lot operates ever since.

Fall: The Superior Court refuses to intervene to stop demolition. There will be no appeal.

Winter: The Lafontaine house and its extensions have their insides ripped out and removed for offices. Weeks later, the collapse occurs.

=== 1991 ===
September: Fires are set in the truncated houses on Mackay Street. There is now little left of the street's protected houses on to demolish. That happens a week later. The brick triplexes on Overdale are already gone, unprotested, replaced by more parking space.

October: A $200,000-bond required by Cohen and Landau to guarantee new construction, required by their rezoning and permission to demolish, is due but goes unpaid.

=== 1992 ===
May 22: An exhibition of art relating to the fight to preserve the homes of Overdale is opened in the Concordia University art gallery.

=== 2001 ===
A squat to draw attention to poverty and the housing crisis in Montreal occupies the Lafontaine house for several weeks.

=== 2006 ===
Winter: The mature Kentucky coffeetrees cut back a few years earlier, in front of the Lafontaine house are cut down, their roots pulled up.

Spring: Several big-name celebrated Canadians from across the country ask for something to be done about the Lafontaine house. They suggest turning the house into a museum.

June: Fish asks Mayor Gérald Tremblay to step in and at least to homologate the property around the Lafontaine House immediately. The request is shunted off to the local mayor of the arrondissement. Senator Serge Joyal. Lise Bacon and Phyllis Lambert ask the Federal Monuments Commission to declare the house a federal historic site. The Commission of Federal Monuments refuses so to do.

They then apply to the Provincial Monuments Commission to classify the House. The Commission refuses but agrees to reconsider.

Jean Francois Lisée, Jacques Monet, and other noted historians urge the classification of the building by the province in local newspapers. They invoke the crucial historic importance of Lafontaine to Canada and to the survival of French speaking people in North America.

August: Alan Hustak of The Gazette writes an article about the house in which several interested groups are quoted as wanting the house used for a public interpretation centre. An editorial the next day states that people wanting that should just purchase the property. Landau, the owner, says that the site is worth $50 million.

== Aftermath ==
Several prominent and longtime MCM councilors were outraged by the decision to allow the project and quit the party. They included Sam Boskey, Marvin Rotrand and Marcel Sevigny. The MCM suffered a split from which it would never recover. Doré and the MCM were voted out of office in 1994.

Since 1992, a new City Master Plan has been written for the whole city. The Overdale frontage allows 25 m buildings.

== See also ==
- YUL Condos, a planned development

== Bibliography ==
- City executive OKs Overdale project, The Gazette (Montreal), Thursday, August 13, 1987
- Developers must replace cheap housing The Gazette (Montreal) Wednesday, June 3, 1987, Page: A1.
- Six Overdale protesters arrested at demolition site; By ALEXANDER NORRIS. The Gazette. Montreal, Que.: Oct 5, 1988. pg. A.3
- Overdale developer blasts city; The Gazette. Montreal, Que.: Oct 28, 1988. pg. A.3
- Overdale, parkland called MCM's flops; By LEWIS HARRIS. The Gazette. Montreal, Que.: Feb 23, 1989. pg. A.3
- Do reformers run Montreal City Hall? Overdale Project splits ruling MCM Shulze, David. This Magazine. Toronto: Mar/Apr 1989. Vol. 22, Iss. 8; pg. 7
- Overdale protesters plead guilty, placed on year's probation; RENE LAURENT. The Gazette. Montreal, Que.: Jan 17, 1990. pg. A.3
- John Gardiner: from wild-eyed radical to developers' ally; MARION SCOTT. The Gazette. Montreal, Que.: Oct 27, 1990. pg. B.1
- Bulldozed and boarded; Fire leaves Overdale ex-tenants steaming; ANN McLAUGHLIN. The Gazette. Montreal, Que.: Sep 10, 1991. pg. A.3
- Overdale dies: construction deadline expires; MICHELLE LALONDE. The Gazette. Montreal, Que.: Oct 11, 1991. pg. A.3
- Squatters still going strong: Overdale activists vow never to leave new homes at city-owned Centre Prefontaine; ALLISON HANES. The Gazette. Montreal, Que.: Aug 23, 2001. pg. A.4
- Sevigny exits politics by burning politicians; LINDA GYULAI. The Gazette. Montreal, Que.: Sep 25, 2001. pg. A.6
- Heritage parking lots: Development plans for historic sites all too often have failed to pan out, leaving empty or underused spaces; JOSHUA WOLFE. The Gazette. Montreal, Que.: Sep 14, 2002. pg. H.4
- A smashing historic residence ALAN HUSTAK. The Gazette. Montreal: Aug 21, 2008. pg. A.4
- Mayor probably hoping we'll forget about bread; Jack Todd. The Gazette. Montreal, Que.: May 19, 1992. pg. A.3
- Housing group FRAPRU summary of the events
- Montreal Gazette article on the subject from 1986
- Moubayed, Anna-Maria. "Overdale Avenue: Narrative, Urban Design and Utopia." Montreal as a Palimpsest: Architecture, Community, Change. Montreal: Gail and Stephen Jarislowsky Institute for the Study of Canadian Art, 2008.
