= Bishopscourt =

Bishopscourt may refer to:

== Places ==
=== Australia ===
- Bishopscourt, East Melbourne, a gothic architecture building in East Melbourne, Victoria, Australia
- Bishopscourt, Darling Point, a historic house in Sydney, Australia

=== Ireland ===
- Bishopscourt, County Kildare, the former seat of the Earls of Clonmell in County Kildare, Ireland
- Bishopscourt, Straffan, the home of Irish politician John Ponsonby, located in Straffan, Ireland
- Bishopscourt Racing Circuit, a motor racing track in County Down, Northern Ireland

=== Isle of Man ===
- Bishopscourt, Isle of Man, a mansion house, chapel and estate on the Isle of Man, United Kingdom

=== New Zealand ===
- Bishopscourt, Dunedin, a historic property in Dunedin, New Zealand, built by William Mason

=== South Africa ===
- Bishopscourt, Cape Town, a southern suburb of Cape Town, South Africa

== See also ==
- Bishop Court Apartments
- Bishops' Court
