= Troitsky Bridge Building Competition =

Annual engineering event

The Troitsky Bridge Building Competition is an annual event that takes place at Concordia University in Montreal, Quebec, Canada in the spring. Participating teams of engineering students come from universities across Canada and the United States. They design and build model bridges out of popsicle sticks, toothpicks, white glue and dental floss.

== History ==
The competition began in the 1960s when Dr. Michael S. Troitsky, a professor in the Civil Engineering Department of Sir George Williams University spoke with students in his bridge design class about building bridge models similar to those in their course work. Students then began building small-scale bridge models using wood and glue.

By 1984, the department had become the Department of Building, Civil and Environmental Engineering (BCEE) of Concordia University and held the First Annual Bridge Building Competition. Initially, the contest was only open to Civil Engineering students enrolled at Concordia. Later the event expanded to include other universities in the province of Quebec, then those across Canada. In 1991, the competition included its first international teams, from the United States.

In 1990, the 1988 Civil Engineering graduating class created an award for most innovative concept, and dedicated it to the memory of Lars Rowland, an alumnus who completed his B.Eng in 1988 at Concordia and was working as a civil engineer for Canadair when he died in 1990 piloting his plane. The inscription reads:

"May his creativity, compassion, and love of life serve to inspire you, as it has us, in the pursuit of your dreams."

The Crusher, the hydraulic press which tests the strength of each bridge and is the focal point of the competition, has a history of its own. The original Crusher was a hydraulic device which, after ten years of service, was damaged beyond repair in 1994 - exploding hydraulic fluid all over the judges and competitors while attempting to crush the truss-bridge designed by Hugues Rivard, who was a Masters student at BCEE. A mark remains on the ceiling of the Hall Building Alumni Auditorium from the incident, and the real capacity of Rivard's bridge remains a mystery. The next Crusher was a donation from Wainbee in 1994. It was a screw jack style mechanism controlled by a computer. It could apply loads of up to 6000 pounds. In 2000, Mechtronix Inc. donated a new Crusher, which has a 10-ton capacity. During the 2000 competition, a bridge resisted up to 1860 kgf. The winner, however, is the one that has the highest overall score in terms of capacity, esthetic value, and originality. For the 2010 competition a brand new crusher donated by Concordia's department of Building, Civil, and Environmental Engineering and is follows its origins and is again a hydraulic jack.

== Recent Competitions ==
=== 2006 competition ===
The 2006 competition was held on March 10. Over 40 teams participated in the event. Pictures of the event can be seen here and here. A short video of the competition can be seen on Discovery Channels page here

=== 2007 Competition ===
The 2007 Competition took place on March 2, 2007. Picture gallery.

=== 2010 Competition ===
The 2010 Competition took place on March 5, 2010. The pictures of the event can be seen here.

=== 2012 Competition ===
The 2012 Competition took place on March 2, 2012.

=== 2013 Competition ===
The 2013 Competition took place on March 1 and 2, 2013.

=== 2016 Competition ===
Winning Team - Mcmaster University: Mike Sucharda, Neil MacPhee, Daniel LeeKim, Matt East, Trever Reade, and Cuirin Cantwell. March 5, 2016.

=== 2017 Competition ===
Winning Team - Mcmaster University: Cody VanDerKooi, Brett Pajor, Eric Nogard, Jessica Middleton, Carley German, and Matthew Winters. March 5, 2017.

=== 2018 Competition ===
Winning Team - Mcmaster University: Cody VanDerKooi, Zach Gerber, Eric Nogard, Andreas Zbogar, Carley German, and Matthew Winters. March 4, 2018.

=== 2020 Competition ===
Winning Team- University of Toronto: Aidan Ashton, Camilo Dugand, Naomi Tian, Sydney Ng, Kent Straky, Fahd Mohammed. March 1, 2020

=== 2021 Competition ===
Winning Team- University of Toronto: Aidan Ashton, Camilo Dugand, Naomi Tian, Sydney Ng, Kent Straky, Fahd Mohammed. March 7, 2021

=== 2022 Competition ===
Winning Team- University of Toronto

=== 2023 Competition ===
Winning Team- British Columbia Institute of Technology

=== 2024 Competition ===
Winning Team- Peoples Academy, Vermont, USA: Gigi Calhoun, Phoenix Masten, Lucy Nigro, Gabbie Schaffer. February 25, 2024

=== 2025 Competition ===
Winning Team- British Columbia Institute of Technology: Ronin Sakamoto, Izack Ginter, Trevor Lau, Joshua Johnson, Patrick Ngo, Ravi Gill, Avi Uppal, Luke Loewen, Ethan Aliwalas, Marina Heisel

=== 2026 Competition ===
Winning Team- British Columbia Institute of Technology: Luke Loewen, Marina Heisel, Liang Huang, Prabhjot Virk, Arav Singh, Prabjot Sabharwal, Alex Thormeyer, Justin Zou, Bhuvnoor Sahi
