= Bishop Street =

Street in Montreal, Canada

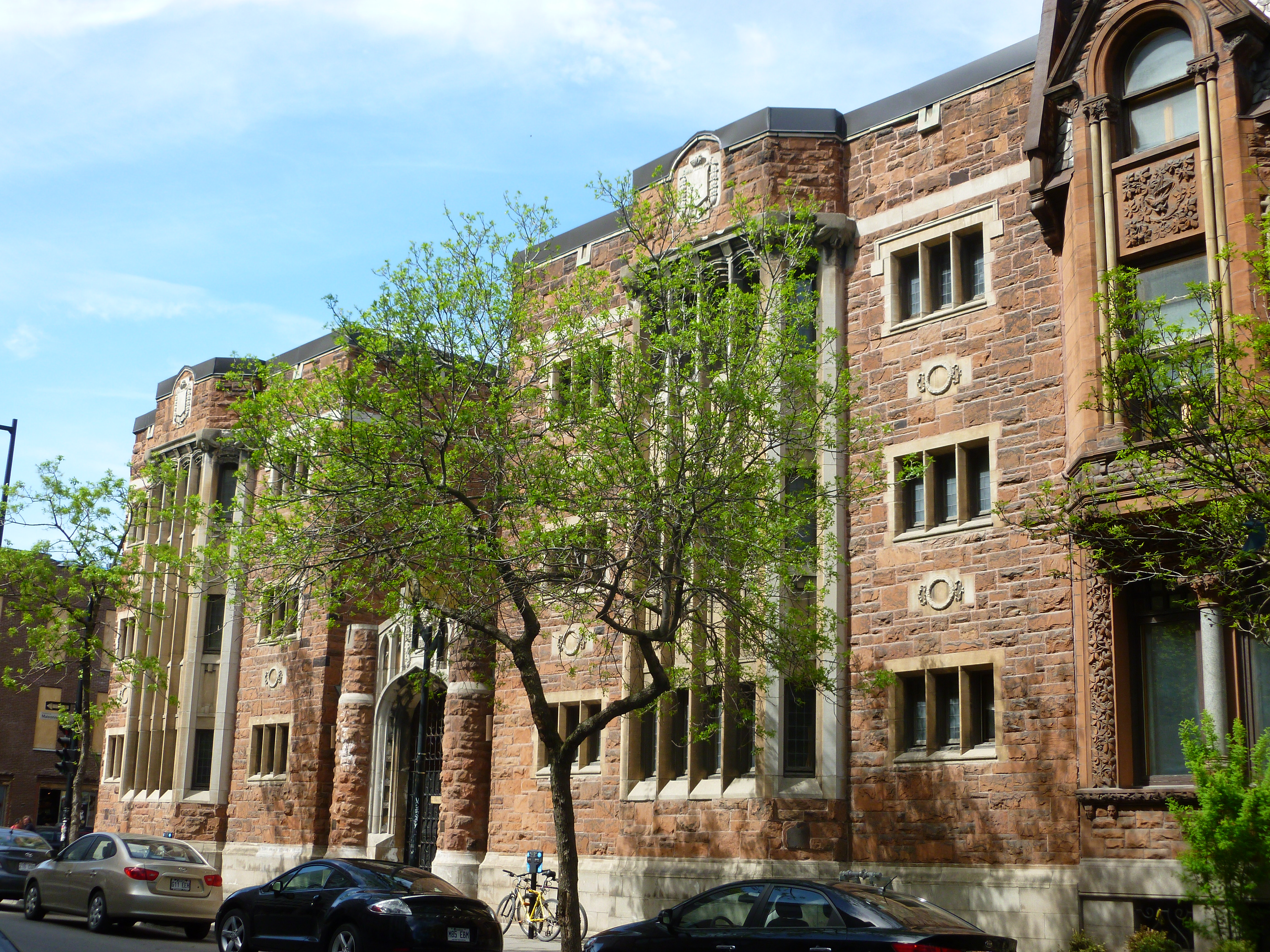
- Bishop Court Apartments
- Interactive map of Bishop Street
- Native name: rue Bishop (French)
- Length: 0.6 km (0.37 mi)
- Location: Between Sherbrooke Street and René Lévesque Boulevard
- Coordinates: 45.496861°N 73.577041°W

Construction
- Construction start: 1887

Bishop Street (officially in French: rue Bishop) is a north–south street located in downtown Montreal, Quebec, Canada. With a total length of 0.6 km, it links Sherbrooke Street in the north to René Lévesque Boulevard in the south. Like neighbouring Crescent Street, Bishop is home to many pubs, bars, clubs and restaurants.

The street borders the main downtown campus of Concordia University, including the Henry F. Hall Building, Bishop Court Apartments and the former Royal George Apartments, whose facade is now part of the J.W. McConnell Building.

== History ==
The origin of the name Bishop Street is uncertain, but is known to be linked to the Anglican community. In 1887, it was named "Bishop Street", perhaps named for the first Anglican bishop of Montreal, Francis Fulford (1803-1868), whose first residence was located on the corner of Dorchester Street (today René Lévesque Boulevard).

Bishop Street may be named for George C. Bishop 1837-1910 who built a number of homes in that area in the 1870s. In 1878 he built a stone home on Osborn St. between Mountain and Windsor Streets at the foot of Drummond.
