= Concordia University Library =

University library in Montreal, Canada

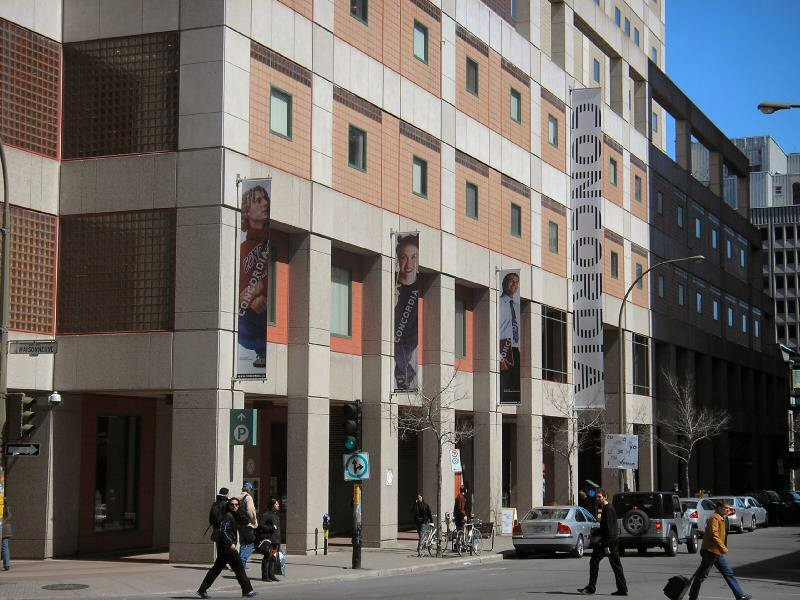
- The J.W. McConnell Building houses the R. Howard Webster Library.
- 45.496979°N 73.578384°W
- Location: Montreal, Quebec, Canada
- Type: Academic library
- Branches: 2

Collection
- Size: 1.75 millilion, 100,000+ journals

Access and use
- Circulation: 100,000
- Population served: 44,000 students 1.8 million visits in 2024-25

Other information
- Budget: CAD $ 19M (CAD $5.5M in digital resources)(2015-2016)
- Director: Amy Buckland
- Employees: 112
- Website: library.concordia.ca

Concordia University Library is the library system at Concordia University in Montreal, Quebec, Canada. Concordia University has three library locations. The R. Howard Webster Library is located in the J.W. McConnell Building on the Sir George Williams Campus and the Georges P. Vanier Library is located on the Loyola Campus. On September 2, 2014, the Library opened the Grey Nuns Reading Room, a silent study space for Concordia students located in the former Chapel of the Invention of the Holy Cross. The Reading Room is now managed by the School of Graduate Studies.

The Concordia University Library houses several special collections including the Azrieli Holocaust Collection and the Irving Layton Collection. Most Special Collections are located in the Vanier Library. The Library also maintains the university's institutional repository, Spectrum.

The Concordia University Library is a member of the Canadian Association of Research Libraries. Concordia University Library also has partnerships with the Canadian Research Knowledge Network and The Data Liberation Initiative.

== Branches ==
There are two branches of the Concordia University Library:

- R. Howard Webster Library, 1400 De Maisonneuve Boulevard West, Montreal, QC
- Georges P. Vanier Library, 7141 Sherbrooke Street West, Montreal, QC
Photo gallery

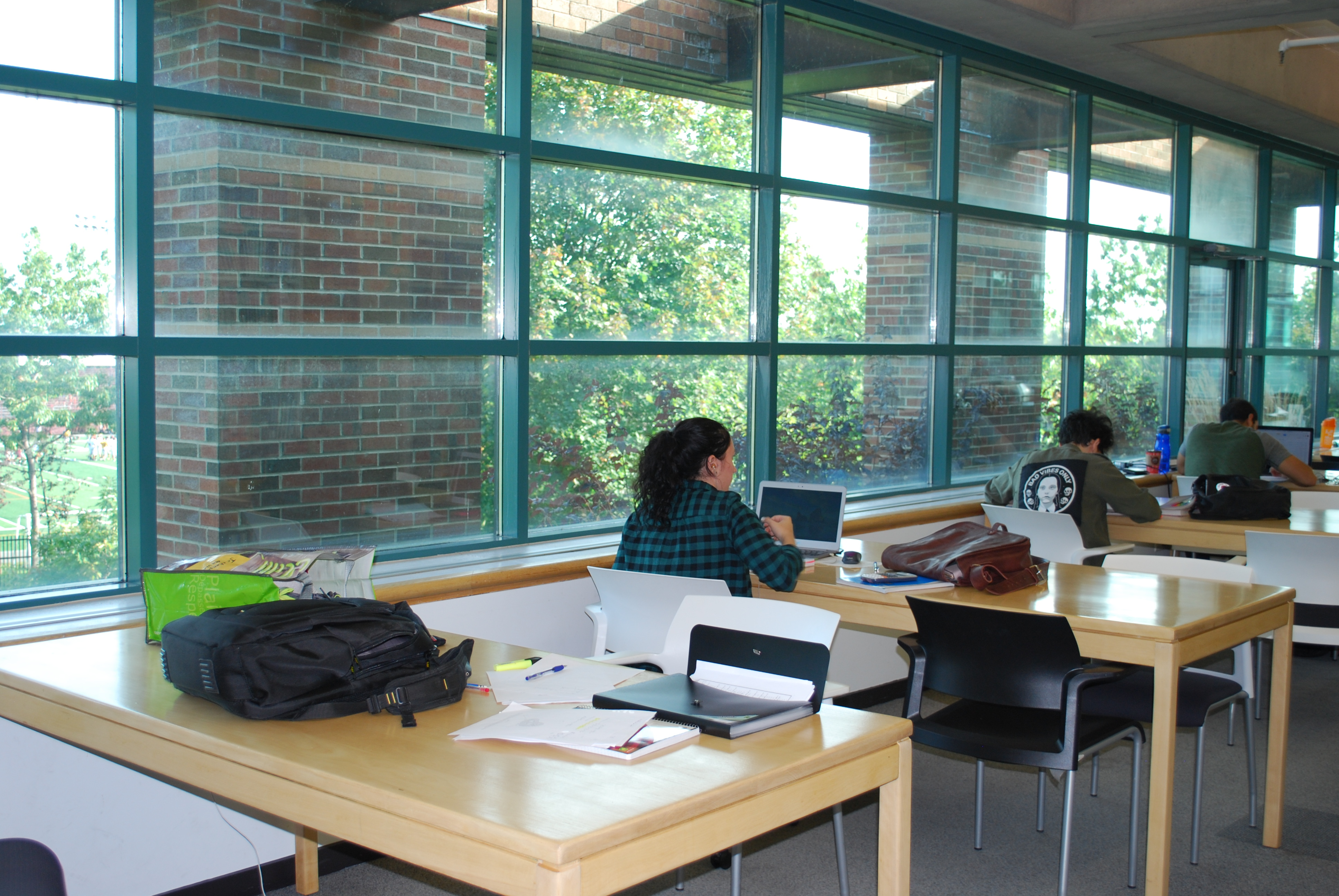
Study space at the Vanier Library, Concordia University

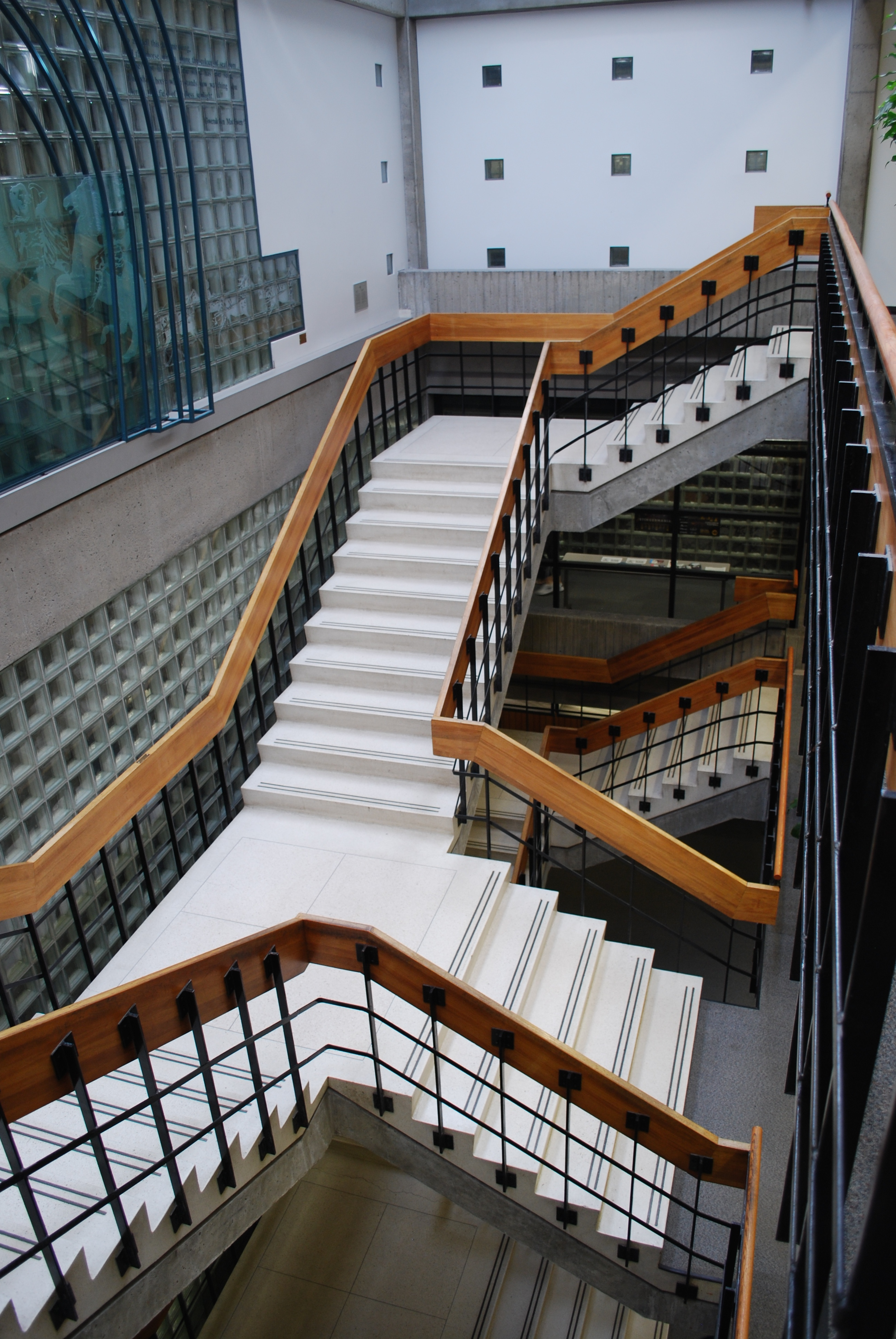
Stairwell in the Vanier Library, Concordia University

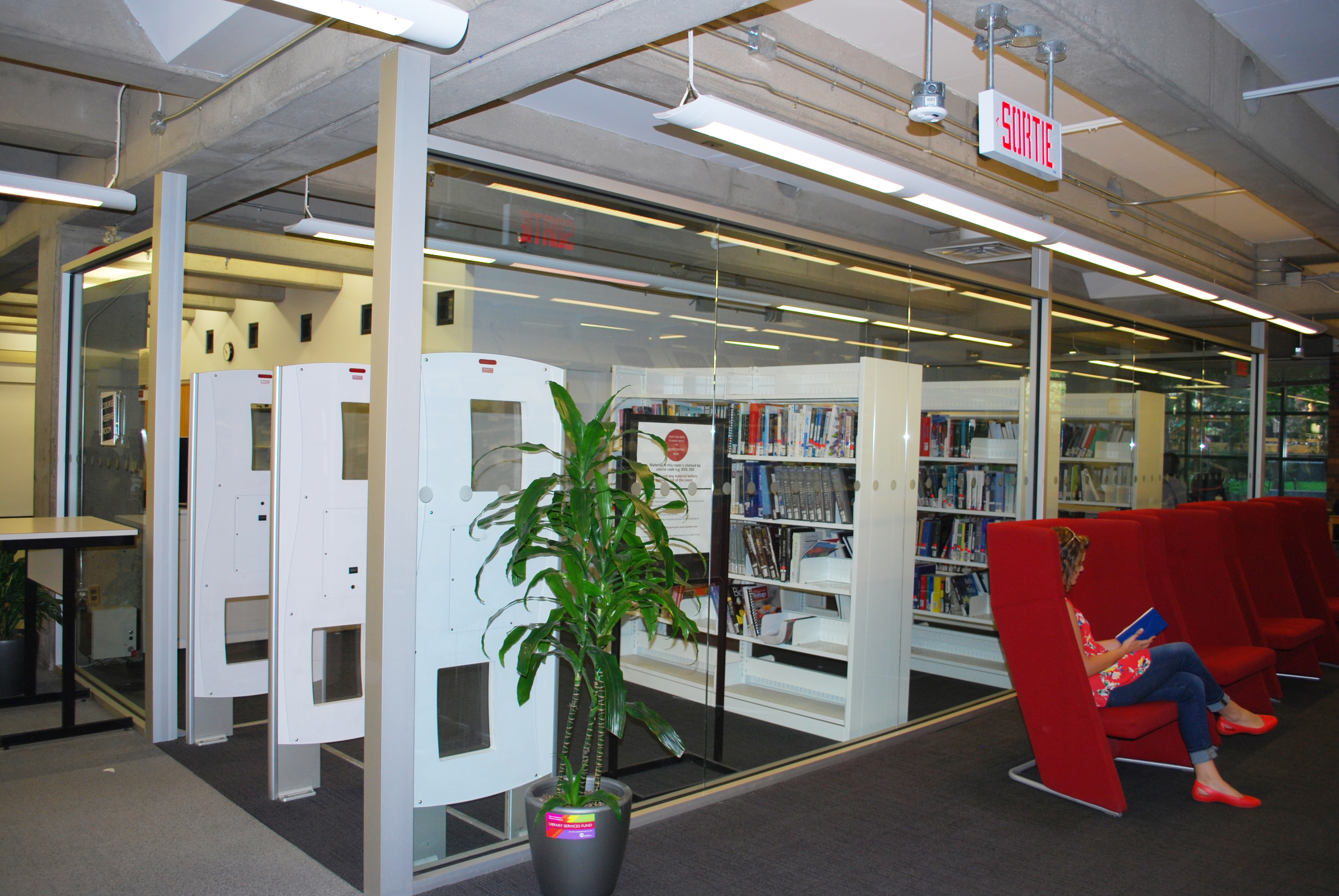
Vanier Library's Course Reserves Room, Concordia University

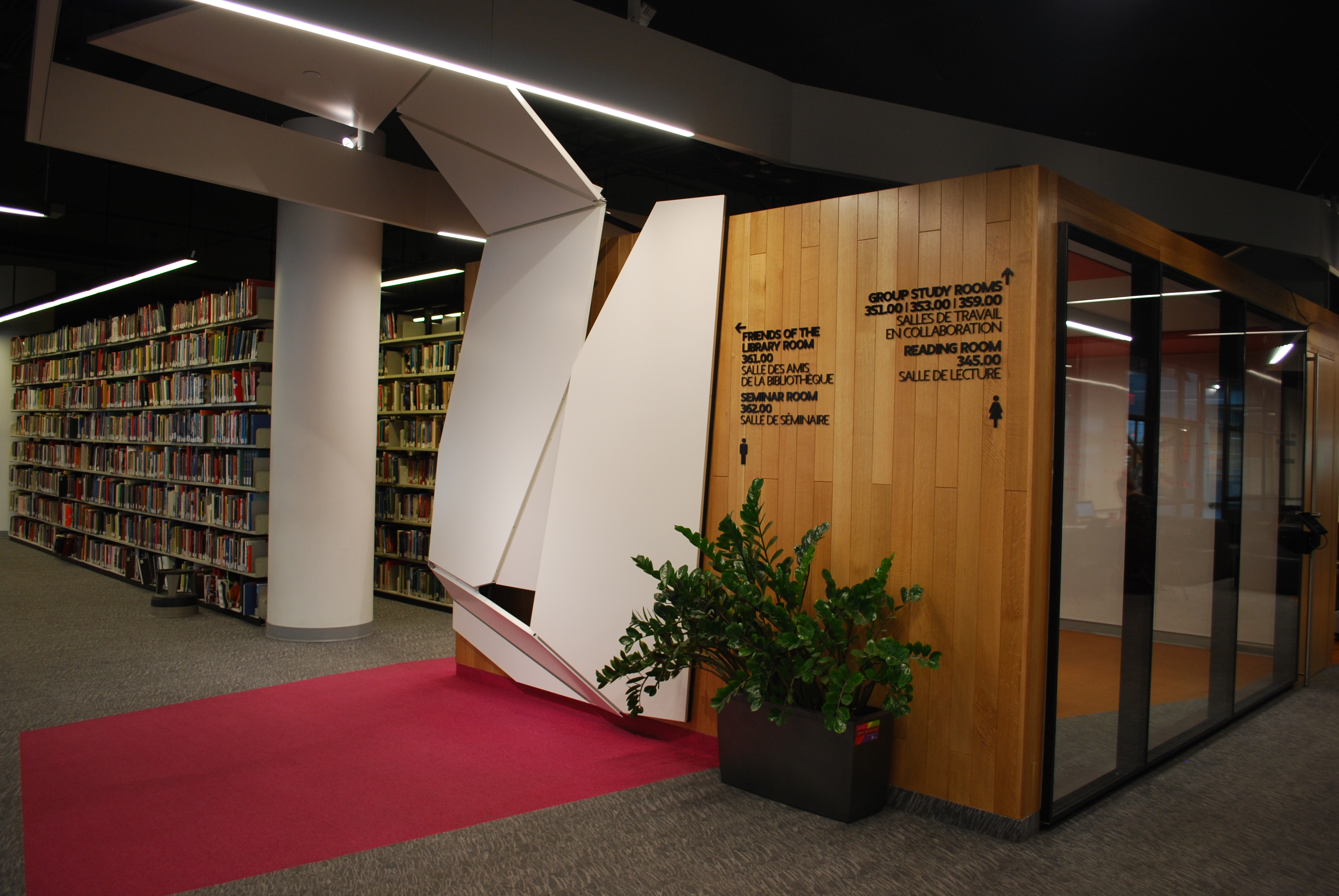
Renovated in 2015, the third floor of the Webster Library, Concordia University.

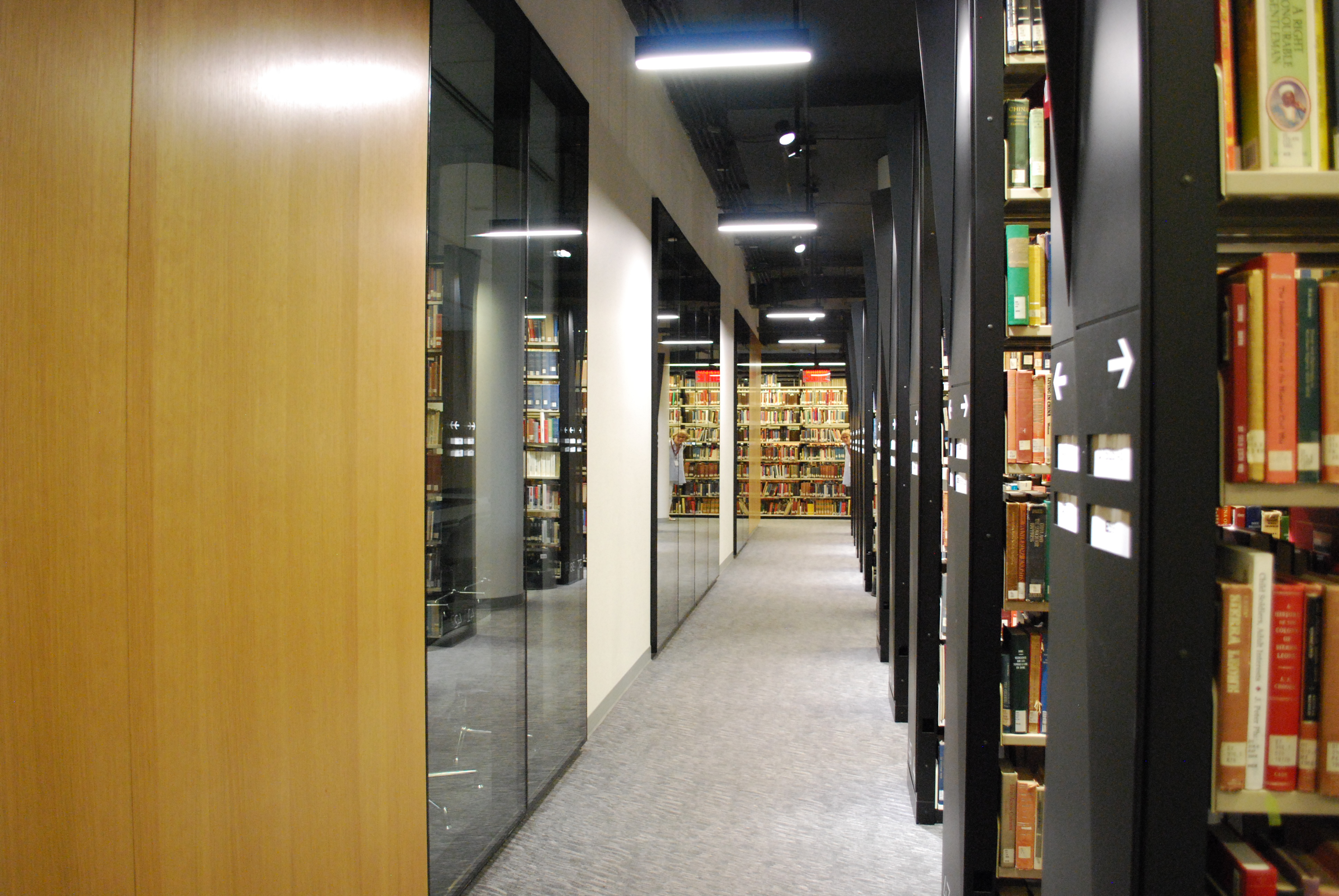
Renovated in 2015, the third floor of the Webster Library houses the Seminar Room (left) and part of the book collection.

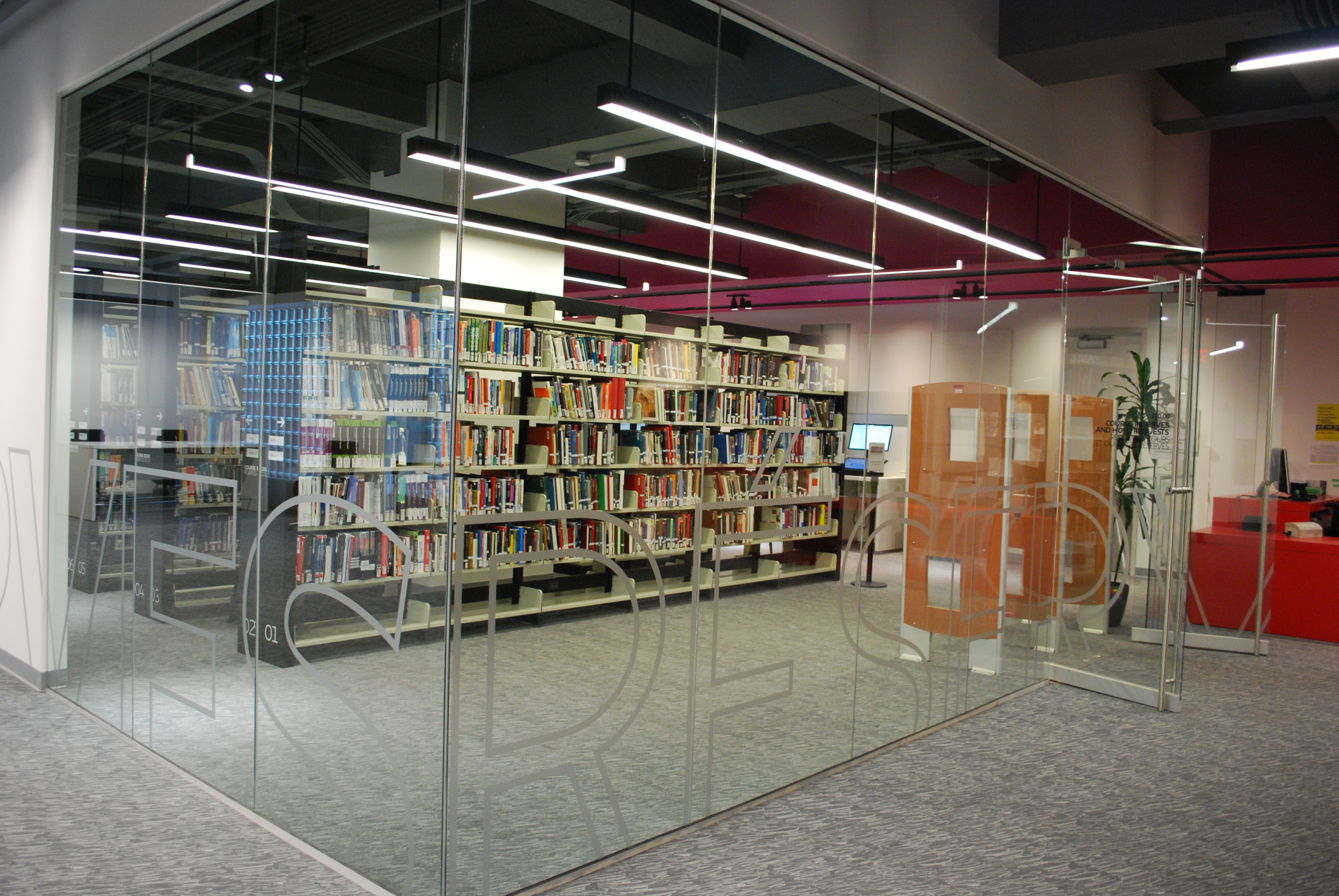
Webster Library's Course Reserves Room, Concordia University
