= Bishop Court Apartments =

- French: Appartements Bishop Court
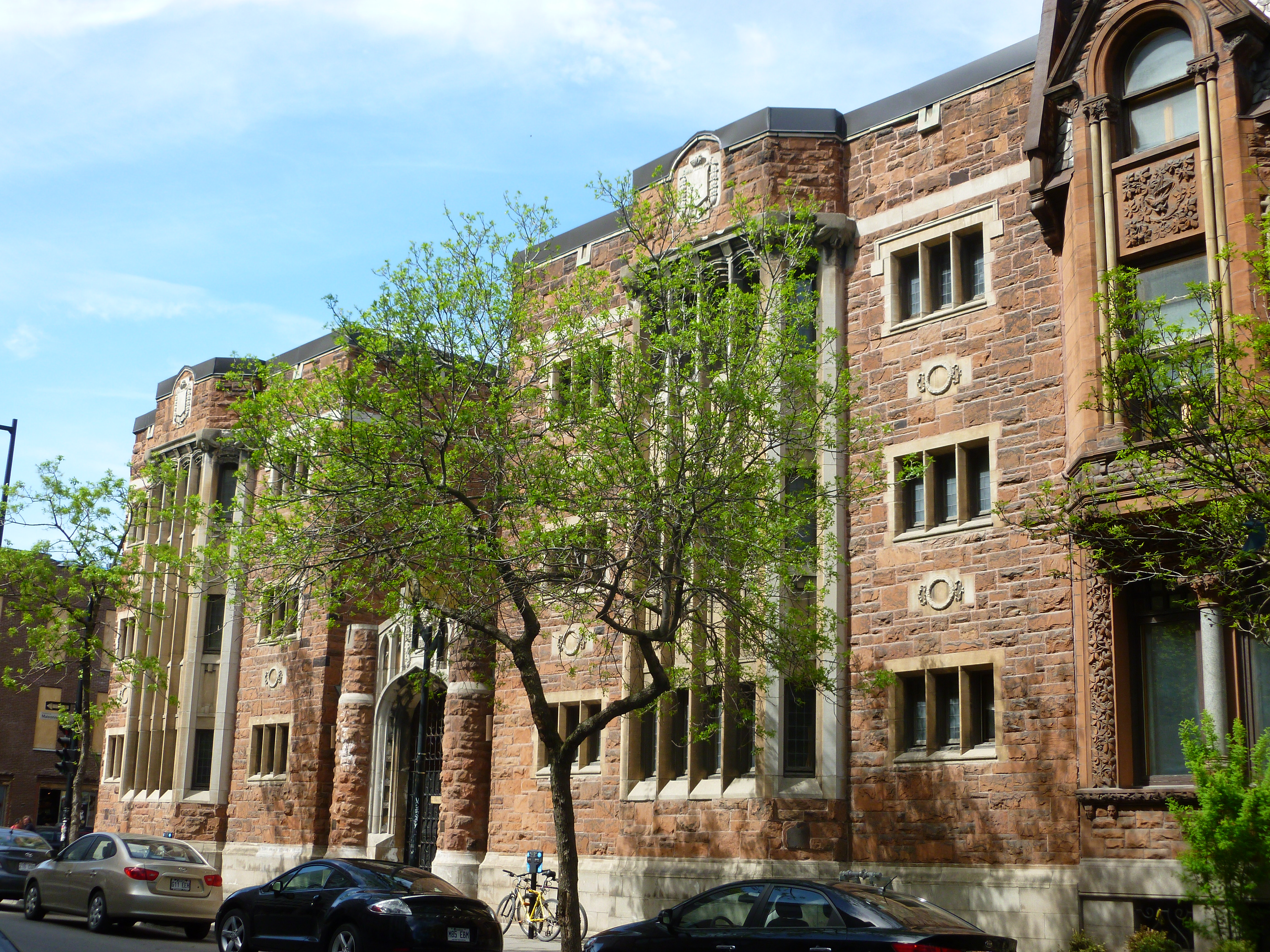
- Interactive map of the Bishop Court Apartments area

General information
- Architectural style: Tudor Revival
- Location: 1463 Bishop Street, Montreal, Quebec, Canada, Canada
- Coordinates: 45°29′50.8″N 73°34′39.5″W
- Completed: 1904
- Renovated: 1975
- Cost: C$50,000
- Renovation cost: C$600,000
- Client: Robert Neville Jr.

Technical details
- Floor count: 3

Design and construction
- Architecture firm: Saxe and Archibald

Bishop Court Apartments (French: Appartements Bishop Court) is a historic apartment building in Montreal, Quebec, Canada. It is located at 1463 Bishop Street, at the corner of De Maisonneuve Boulevard West in Downtown Montreal.

The apartment building is three stories, and comprises three wings, linked together in a "U" shape around a small interior courtyard. It formerly consisted of six apartments of six rooms per wing, for a total of 18 apartments.

It is built in Neo-Tudor style, and is reflective of a 15th-century English manor house. Its facade is polychrome Scottish sandstone. The metal grille in the archway entrance was added in the 1970s.

== History ==
The Bishop Court Apartments were built on land that was formerly a cricket field. The building was constructed in 1904 for C$50,000. The plans were prepared by Saxe and Archibald for Robert Neville Jr. Charles Jewett Saxe (1870-1943) has also worked on the Ernest Cormier Building, the Montreal Technological Institute, and Emmanuel United Church.

Between 1953 and 1956, De Maisonneuve Boulevard (then Burnside Street) was widened between Stanley Street and Guy Street to provide more room for automobile traffic. The adjacent building was demolished, leaving Bishop Court with a blank wall facing De Maisonneuve Boulevard.

Concordia University began leasing the building in 1975 to provide offices for its senior administration. Following the threat of its demolition in 1976, the Government of Quebec recognized the facade on Bishop Street, as well as the interior courtyard, as historic sites. Concordia purchased the building in February 1981.

The building was renovated extensively in 1975 for C$600,000 to adapt it into offices from residential units. The renovations were controversial at the time, although contributed to preventing the building from being demolished. It was renovated again in 1995.

Concordia University sold Bishop Court in 2010 for approximately C$3.2 million.
