= Gina Cody =

Canadian-Iranian engineer and businesswoman

Gina Cody CM
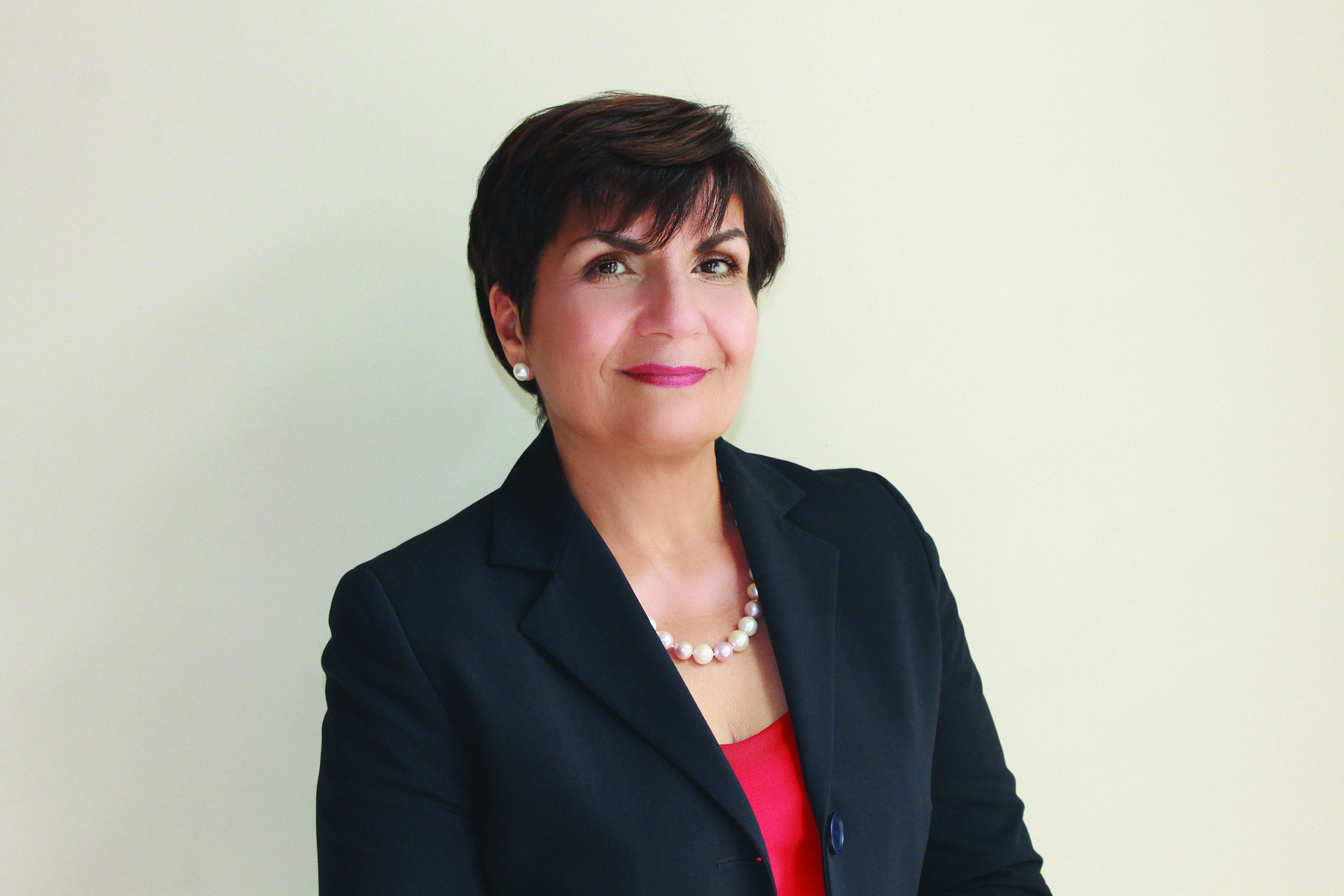
- Born: Iran
- Education: Sharif University of Technology; Concordia University
- Spouse: Thomas Cody
- Scientific career
- Fields: Structural Engineering
- Workplaces: Concordia University; Ontario Ministry of Affairs and Housing; CCI Group Inc.
- Thesis: (1989)

Gina Parvaneh Cody CM is a Canadian-Iranian engineer and business leader.

In 1989, Cody became the first woman in Canada to earn a PhD in building engineering. In 2018, following her donation of $15 million, Concordia University renamed its faculty of engineering and computer science after her (the Gina Cody School of Engineering and Computer Science), making it the first university engineering and computer science faculty to be named after a woman in Canada, and one of the first internationally.

== Early life and education ==
Cody was born in Iran in 1956. Her father owned a boy's high school, where she taught during the summer. Her three brothers became engineers, while her sister became a dentist. In 1978, Cody completed a Bachelor of Science degree in structural engineering at Aryamehr University of Technology (now called Sharif University of Technology).

Cody left Iran for Canada in 1979 with $2,000. At this point, her brother had completed a Bachelor's of Engineering at Concordia University in Montreal, and arranged for her to meet with the engineering professor Cedric Marsh. Through this meeting, Cody received a scholarship in engineering to attend Concordia, where she completed a master's degree in engineering in 1981.

In 1989, Cody became the first woman in Canada to earn a PhD in building engineering, also from Concordia.

== Career ==
Following her PhD, Cody moved to Toronto, where she worked for a year on provincial building codes for Ontario's Ministry of Housing (now the Ministry of Municipal Affairs and Housing). She then moved to the private sector, where she performed tower crane inspections at Construction Control Inc. (CCI), an Ontario-based engineering consulting company, making her the first woman to climb Toronto construction cranes as an inspector. She worked her way up through CCI to become its president.

Cody eventually became the executive chair and principal shareholder of CCI Group Inc. She sold CCI Group Inc. and retired in 2016. Following a 2016 merger, the CCI Group Inc. now operates as McIntosh Perry Consulting Engineers.

In 2018, Cody made a $15-million gift to the Concordia University faculty she had twice graduated from, which was renamed the Gina Cody School of Engineering and Computer Science. It is the first engineering and computer science faculty in Canada and one of the first in the world named after a woman. Her contribution supports measures to increase the presence of women in STEM and funds 100 undergraduate and 40 graduate entrance scholarships across the faculty. In addition, it supports the Canada Excellence Research Chair in Smart and Resilient Cities and Communities, and enables the next-generation work of three new research chairs – in the internet of things, artificial intelligence, and industry 4.0.

Cody became co-chancellor of Concordia University on May 1, 2024, alongside fellow alumnus Jonathan Wener. She commenced a three-year term as chancellor on January 1, 2025.

=== Awards and honours ===
For her contributions to engineering, business and her community, Cody has received numerous awards, including an Award of Merit from the Canadian Standards Association, a Volunteer Service Award from the Government of Ontario and Officer of the Order of Honour of Professional Engineers Ontario. The Financial Post recognized Construction Control (then under Cody's management) as one of Canada's best managed companies. In 2010, Profit magazine named Cody one of Canada's Top Women Entrepreneurs, and listed CCI as the ninth most profitable Canadian company owned by a woman. The following year, the Concordia University Alumni Association named her Alumna of the Year.

Cody was named to the Order of Montreal in 2019 and was appointed a Member of the Order of Canada in 2021. She was inducted as a Fellow of the Canadian Academy of Engineering in 2019. Cody was named one of Canada's Top 25 Women of Influence in 2020 and a Woman of Distinction by the Women’s Y Foundation of Montreal in 2023.

In 2022 Cody was awarded an honorary doctorate in engineering by the University of Sherbrooke and named outstanding major donor for 2022 by the Association of Fundraising Professionals (AFP) Quebec. She is also an honorary Lieutenant-Colonel of the 34 Combat Engineer Regiment (CER) of the Canadian Armed Forces.

== Personal life ==
Cody currently resides in Toronto and is married to Thomas Cody, a Concordia MBA graduate and retired Bank of America Canada senior vice-president, whom she met while both were students at Concordia. The couple have two daughters, Roya and Tina Cody.
