= District 3 Innovation Centre =

Startup accelerator and entrepreneurial community

District 3 Innovation Hub
- Logo since 2017
- Industry: Startup accelerator, education
- Founded: 2013; 13 years ago
- Founder: Xavier-Henri Hervé, Sydney Swaine, Charles Gedeon, Ali Tahouni
- Headquarters: Montréal, Québec, Canada
- Number of locations: 2 spaces (2016)
- Key people: Xavier-Henri Hervé, Noor El Bawab
- Website: district3.co

District 3 Innovation Hub (D3) is a startup accelerator and entrepreneurial community located within Concordia University in downtown Montréal where students, alumni and academic leaders share ideas and generate new products. It is located in the Faubourg building following a grant of $1 million from André Desmarais and France Chrétien Desmarais.

== Overview ==
It hold events aimed at creating connections between members from different industry sectors. Startups use the D3 space during their startup programs, while many other people use it to make prototypes, get mentorship, and have a co-working space located within a university. The program assists high potential startups with finding funding.

In 2016, District 3 was awarded "Startup Canada Entrepreneur Support Award" for the Quebec region.

== Partnerships and events ==
On June 9, 2016, District 3 partnered InnoCité MTL, TandemLaunch, Founder Institute, Centech and FounderFuel to host Montréal's first event with all the city's incubators present. In January 2016, District 3 started hosting teams for the IBM Watson AI XPrize competition as part of a partnership, an initiative led by Sydney Swaine. In 2017, D3 became the official community partner of Singularity University in Montréal, hosting the official satellite event on October 11–12, 2017.
