= Concordia Student Union =

- Abbreviation: CSU
- Formation: 1979
- Type: Student Union
- Legal status: Accredited Association, Not-for-Profit
- Purpose: Student Representation
- Headquarters: 1455, boulevard de Maisonneuve Ouest; Suite H-711; Montreal, Quebec, Canada
- Region served: Concordia University
- Members: 35,000+ Concordia undergraduates
- Official language: English
- Affiliations: none
- Budget: 4.5 million CAD$
- Staff: 50
- Volunteers: 100+
- Website: www.csu.qc.ca

The Concordia Student Union (usually referred to as the CSU) is the organization representing all undergraduate students at Concordia University in Montreal, Quebec, Canada. Its membership totals around 35,000+ undergraduate students. It is governed by a council elected by students.

== History ==
=== Origin ===
The CSU was originally named the Concordia University Students' Association (CUSA). It was incorporated in 1982 as the Concordia University Students' Association Inc. The name was changed to Concordia Student Union Inc. in 1994 and the "Inc." was dropped from the name in 2002.

=== Accreditation ===
In 2001, CSU undertook an accreditation drive, to legally represent all undergraduate students at Concordia, and was successful in its endeavour, though heavily opposed by the accredited faculty undergraduate student associations for Engineering and Commerce.
