= Canadian Association of Research Libraries =

Professional library organization

- Established: 1976
- President: Vivian Lewis, McMaster University
- Location: 309 Cooper Street, Suite 203, Ottawa, Ontario, Canada
- Website: www.carl-abrc.ca

The Canadian Association of Research Libraries (CARL) was established in 1976 and brings together thirty-one research libraries. Twenty-nine members are university libraries, plus Library and Archives Canada (LAC) and the National Research Council Canada National Science Library (NSL).

== Mission and objectives ==
"CARL provides leadership on behalf of Canada's research libraries and enhances capacity to advance research and higher education. It promotes effective and sustainable knowledge creation, dissemination, and preservation, and public policy that enables broad access to scholarly information."

== CARL members ==
CARL members include 29 university libraries and three federal libraries.

Participating university libraries:

- Brock University
- Carleton University
- Concordia University Libraries
- Dalhousie University
- McGill University Library
- McMaster University
- Memorial University of Newfoundland
- Queen's University
- Simon Fraser University
- Toronto Metropolitan University
- University of Alberta Library
- University of British Columbia Library
- University of Calgary
- University of Guelph
- University of Manitoba
- University of New Brunswick
- University of Ottawa
- University of Regina
- University of Saskatchewan
- University of Toronto Libraries
- University of Victoria
- University of Waterloo
- University of Western Ontario
- University of Windsor
- Université de Montréal
- Université de Sherbrooke
- Université du Québec à Montréal
- Université Laval
- York University Libraries

Federal libraries:

- National Science Library
- Library and Archives Canada
- Library of Parliament

== Partnership and collaboration ==
CARL works with a number of other organizations, including:

- Canadian Federation of Library Associations (CFLA-FCAB)
- Association of Research Libraries (US)
- International Federation of Library Associations and Institutions (IFLA)

== See also ==
- Open access in Canada
