= Mackay Street =

Street in Montreal, Canada

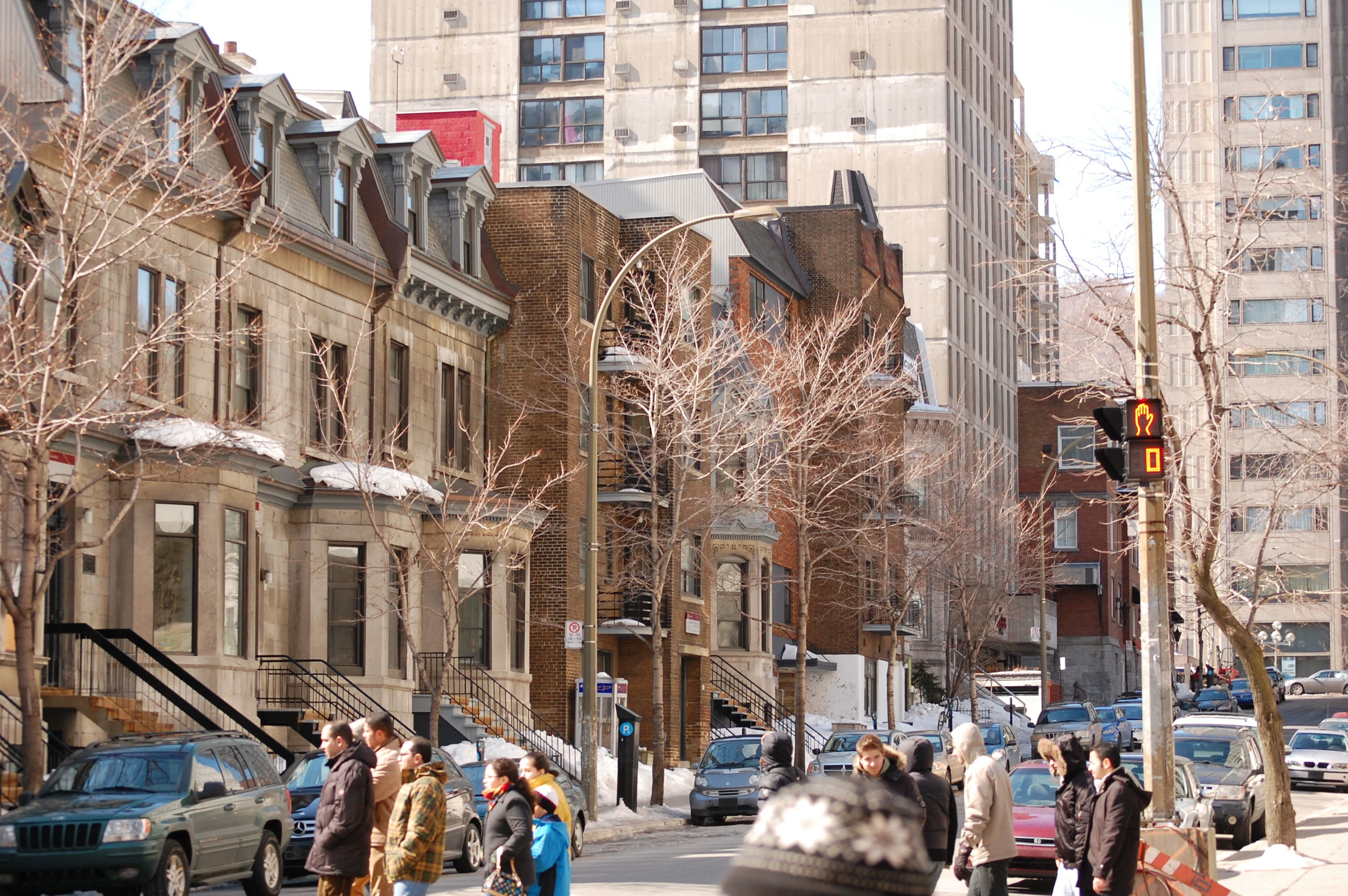
- Mackay Street, between De Maisonneuve Boulevard and Sherbrooke Street
- Interactive map of Mackay Street
- Native name: rue Mackay (French)
- Location: Between Sherbrooke Street and Overdale Avenue
- Coordinates: 45.495947°N 73.577211°W

Mackay Street (officially in French: rue Mackay) is a street located in downtown Montreal, Quebec, Canada. Mackay Street is a one-way street, that begins at Sherbrooke Street West, travels southbound and ends at Overdale Avenue, just south of René Lévesque Boulevard.

Mackay Street is named for James Mackay (1760-1822), a trader and explorer for the North West Company who arrived in Montreal in 1776.

The street is located in the heart of Concordia University's downtown Sir George Williams Campus, otherwise known as the Quartier Concordia.

In April 2009, Concordia University issued a press release calling for proposals on a project that would see part of Mackay Street between Sherbrooke and De Maisonneuve Boulevard turned into a green space for use by students during the summer. The proposal angered local area merchants and residents, who formed a petition to halt the project. They cited the loss of 45 parking spaces, and the potential for student partying in the street. The project has been put on hold, according to the university.

== See also ==
- McTavish Street
