= Concordia University =

University in Montreal, Quebec, Canada

- Coat of arms
- Latin: Universitas Concordia
- Other name: Université Concordia (FR)
- Type: Public university
- Established: August 24, 1974; 52 years ago As constituents: Loyola College (1896); Sir George Williams University (1926)
- Academic affiliations: CARL, CUSID, IAU, Universities Canada
- Endowment: C$426.833 million (2024-2025)
- Budget: C$643.938 million (2024-2025)
- President: Graham Carr
- Vice-Chancellor: Graham Carr
- Provost: Effrosyni (Faye) Diamantoudi
- Faculty: 7,000 (approx.) total faculty and staff (2025)
- Administrative staff: 7,000 (approx.) total faculty and staff (2025)
- Students: 48,657 (as of 2024–25)
- Undergraduates: 35,577 (as of 2024–25)
- Postgraduates: 8,345 (as of 2024–25)
- Other students: Continuing education, 4,735 (as of 2024–25)
- Location: Montreal, Quebec, Canada; 45°29′49″N 73°34′41″W
- Campus: Sir George Williams Campus: Urban Loyola Campus: Suburban, 40 acres (16 ha)
- Language: English
- Newspapers: The Link; The Concordian
- Colours: Maroon; Gold; Black; White
- Nickname: Stingers
- Sporting affiliations: CIS – RSEQ
- Mascot: Buzz
- Website: concordia.ca

Concordia University (French: Université Concordia) is a public English-language research university located in Montreal, Quebec, Canada. Founded in 1974 with the merger of Loyola College and Sir George Williams University, Concordia is one of the three universities in Quebec where English is the primary language of instruction (the others being McGill and Bishop's). As of the 2024–2025 academic year, there were 48,657 students enrolled in credit and non-credit courses at Concordia, making the university among the largest in Canada by enrollment. The university has two campuses, set approximately seven kilometres (four miles) apart: Sir George Williams Campus is the main campus, located in the Quartier Concordia neighbourhood of Downtown Montreal in the borough of Ville Marie; and Loyola Campus in the residential district of Notre-Dame-de-Grâce. With four faculties, a school of graduate studies and numerous colleges, centres and institutes, Concordia offers over 400 undergraduate and over 120 graduate programs and courses.

Concordia is a non-sectarian and coeducational institution, with more than 270,000 alumni. The university is a member of the Association of Universities and Colleges of Canada, International Association of Universities, Canadian Association of Research Libraries, Canadian University Society for Intercollegiate Debate, Canadian Bureau for International Education and Canadian University Press. The university's varsity teams, known as the Stingers, compete in the Quebec Student Sport Federation of U Sports.

== History ==
The roots of Concordia University's founding institutions go back more than 120 years with the establishment of Loyola College in 1896 and Sir George Williams University in 1926.

=== Loyola College ===
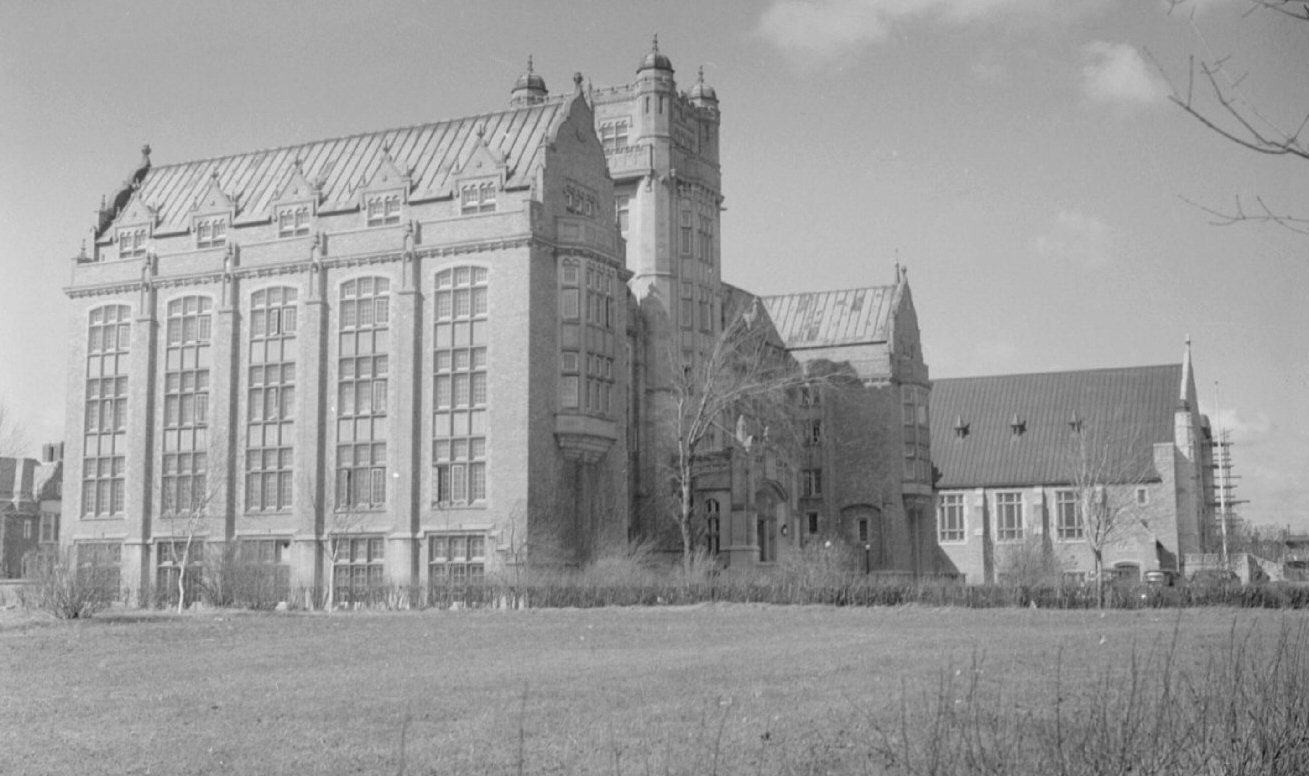
Loyola College in 1937

Loyola College traces its history to an English-language program at the Collège Sainte-Marie de Montréal (today part of the Université du Québec à Montréal) at the Jesuit Sacred Heart Convent. In 1896, Loyola College was established at the corner of Bleury Street and Saint Catherine Street, and it was named in honour of Ignatius of Loyola, founder of the Society of Jesus. On March 10, 1898, the institution was incorporated by the Government of Quebec and became a full-fledged college. The same year, following a fire, the college was relocated further west on Drummond Street, south of Saint Catherine Street. Although founded as a collège classique (the forerunners of Quebec's college system), Loyola began granting university degrees through Université Laval in 1903.

The college moved into the present west-end campus on Sherbrooke Street West in Notre-Dame-de-Grâce in 1916. The School of Sociology opened in 1918. Since Loyola College never became a chartered university, it did not have the ability to grant its own university degrees. In 1920, the institution became affiliated with Université de Montréal, which began granting its degrees instead of Université Laval.

Memorial bronze honour roll plaques in the entrance hall near the administrative offices are dedicated to those from Loyola College who fought in the First World War, Second World War and Korean War.

The inter-war period was marked by the shift of education in the institution, the collège classique education was replaced by humanistic education (Liberal Arts College) in 1940, and Loyola became a four-year institution. Theology and philosophy were taught to all students until 1972.

In 1940, the Faculty of Science and the Department of Engineering were created. In addition to providing the same undergraduate programs as other colleges, the institution also offered innovative fields of study at the time, such as exercise science and communication studies. Students could enrol in academic majors starting in 1953 and honours programs in 1958. Students graduating from Loyola could afterwards pursue graduate-level education in other universities, with a few earning Rhodes Scholarships.

Starting in 1958, Loyola also began offering its first evening courses for students who were not able to go to school full-time. New courses were given in library science and faith community nursing. Since its creation, Loyola College had welcomed almost exclusively young English-speaking Catholic men as students. It became co-ed in 1959.

Obtaining a university charter was an important issue in the 1960s. Although many wanted Loyola College to become Loyola University, the Government of Quebec preferred to annex it to Sir George Williams University. Negotiations began in 1968 and ended with the creation of Concordia University on August 24, 1974.

=== Sir George Williams University ===
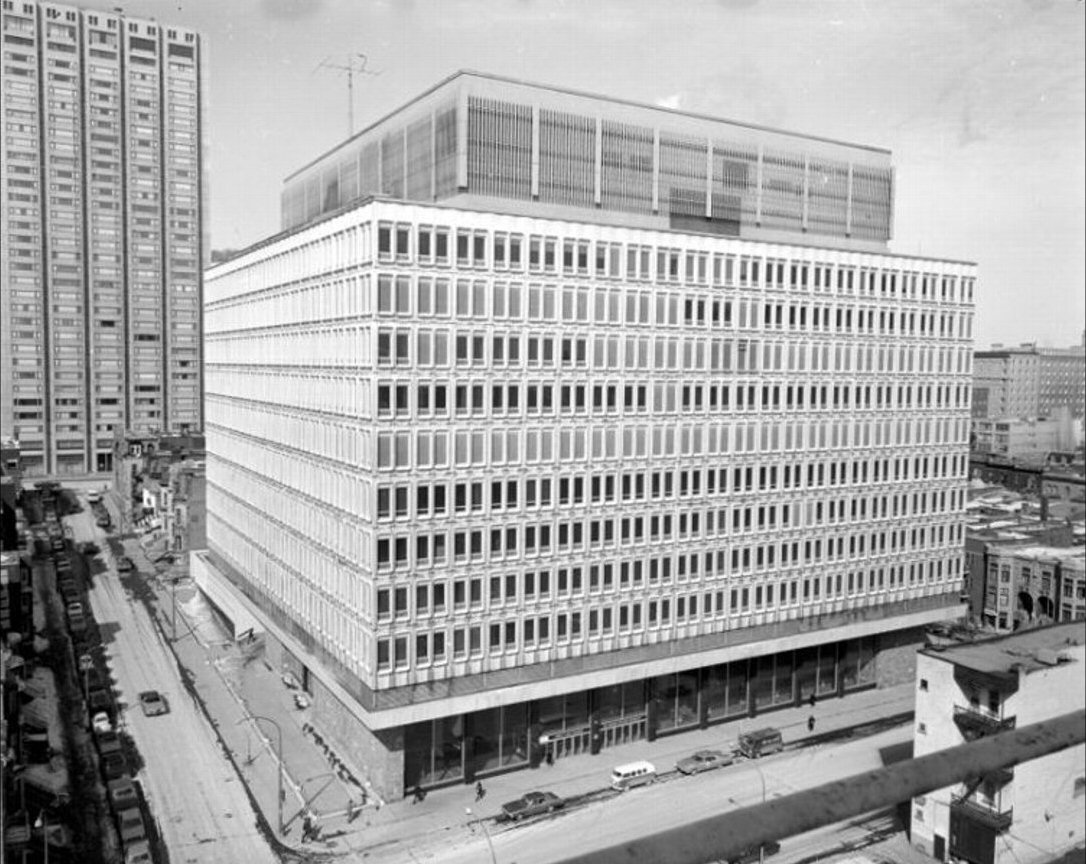
Sir George Williams University's Henry F. Hall Building in 1970

In 1851, the first YMCA in North America was established on Ste. Helene Street in Old Montreal. Beginning in 1873, the YMCA offered evening classes to allow working people in the English-speaking community to pursue their education while working during the day. Sixty years later, the Montreal YMCA relocated to its current location on Stanley Street in Downtown Montreal. In 1926, the education program at the YMCA was reorganized as Sir George Williams College, named after George Williams, founder of the original YMCA in London, England, upon which the Montreal YMCA was based. In 1934, Sir George Williams College offered the first undergraduate credit course in adult education in Canada.

Sir George Williams College received its university charter from the provincial government in 1948, though it remained the education arm of the Montreal YMCA. Sir George Williams expanded into its first standalone building, the Norris Building, in 1956. In 1959, the college requested that the Quebec legislature amend its university charter, changing its name to Sir George Williams University. It established a Centre for Human Relations and Community Studies in 1963. Sir George Williams continued to hold classes in the YMCA building until the construction of the Henry F. Hall Building in 1966.

The university gained international attention in 1969 for what is known as the "Computer Centre Incident." Notably in spring 1968, six black West Indian students at Sir George Williams University accused a biology lecturer (later assistant professor) of racism. The complaint was lodged to the dean of students, Magnus Flynn. Dissatisfied with how the administration was handling their complaint, the students decided to make it a public issue in fall 1968. The students occupied and destroyed the Hall Building's ninth floor computer lab after threatening to do so should the riot squad be called. The events forced the university to re-evaluate its policies, leading to the creation of the Ombuds Office and establishment of the University Regulations on Rights and Responsibilities in April 1971. (See Sir George Williams Affair).

Following several years of discussions and planning, Sir George Williams University merged with Loyola College to create Concordia University in 1974. Concordia provided students with representative student organizations and greater power over administrative decisions at the university.

=== Merger ===
In 1968, in the wake of the Parent Commission Report, which recommended the secularization of Quebec's educational system, the Government of Quebec asked Loyola College and Sir George Williams University to consider some form of union. The proposed merger was discussed by the Loyola-Sir George Williams Joint Steering Committee, a committee created to analyze all forms of possible mergers of the two institutions. It was proposed, in 1969, to create a university federation that allowed students to take courses at both campuses without paying additional fees. There was also mention of a shuttle bus service linking the remote facilities 7 km (4.3 mi) apart.

Criticized for the difficulties encountered by the cohesion of the various departments and faculties, this option was set aside, but not totally rejected by the Joint Steering Committee. The Joint Committee of Representatives of the Board of Trustees of Loyola College and the Board of Governors of Sir George Williams University was formed in December 1971 and in fall 1972 produced a document outlining the basis of a university with two campuses. While the committee considered a number of possible models, including that of a loose federation, the solution finally adopted was that of an integrated institution, Concordia University, operating under the existing charter of Sir George Williams University. Following several revisions in November 1972, the document became the main plan of the proposed merger. It was accepted by both institutions, which began the process of consolidating their operations.

In early 1973, the two institutions announced the merger would take place that fall. However, legal and administrative procedures delayed the merger for another year. On August 24, 1974, the Government of Quebec recognized the merger, thus creating Concordia University. The name was taken from the motto of the city of Montreal, Concordia salus (meaning "well-being through harmony").

"When you join together two lively institutions, each with its own philosophies and ways of doing things, each firmly dedicated to freedom of thought and speech, you must expect a measure of friction. We look forward now to a new period of creative friction."

— Concordia Rector and Vice-Chancellor John O'Brien, on the finalization of the merger, August 16, 1974

=== Post-merger ===
The legal existence of Concordia dates from August 24, 1974. The integration of the various faculties of the two institutions into a coherent whole took several years. The five faculties of the new university were a combination of existing faculties and departments prior to the merger. There was a Faculty of Commerce, Faculty of Science and Faculty of Arts at Sir George Williams University. Additionally, there was a Faculty of Arts and Science at Loyola College. The Faculty of Engineering of both institutions had previously been combined.

The Faculty of Fine Arts was created in 1976.

The first phase of the combination of the Faculties of Arts and Science began in 1977 and ended in 1985.

Concordia's Center for Zero Energy Building Studies opened in 1977. The Center focuses on research into construction of more energy efficient buildings.

In the late 1980s, the Georges P. Vanier Library on the Loyola Campus was enlarged, while in 1992, the library on the Sir George Williams Campus moved to the new J.W. McConnell Building. The Norris Building was closed the same year.

On August 24, 1992, Valery Fabrikant, a mechanical engineering professor, shot five colleagues, killing four, on the ninth floor of the Hall Building. Fabrikant was convicted of the murders and sentenced to life imprisonment. The university erected a memorial to the slain professors (four granite tables) in the Hall Building lobby.

Starting in 1998, the university entered a major phase of expansion to meet its growing student enrolment. In August 2003, Concordia inaugurated the Richard J. Renaud Science Complex on the Loyola Campus.

In 2005, the university launched a major urban redevelopment project in the neighbourhood surrounding the Sir George Williams Campus, known as the Quartier Concordia. That same year, the Engineering, Computer Science and Visual Arts Integrated Complex opened its doors on Saint Catherine Street West between Guy Street and Mackay Street.

In September 2009, the university marked the opening of the new LEED certified building for the John Molson School of Business. The new building hosts a wall of solar panels and is 25% more energy efficient than required under code.

In September 2015, the university held a ribbon cutting for the District 3 Innovation Center's new space on the sixth floor of Concordia's Faubourg Building.

The university opened its interdisciplinary Applied Science Hub in 2020 at the Loyola campus.

== Campuses ==
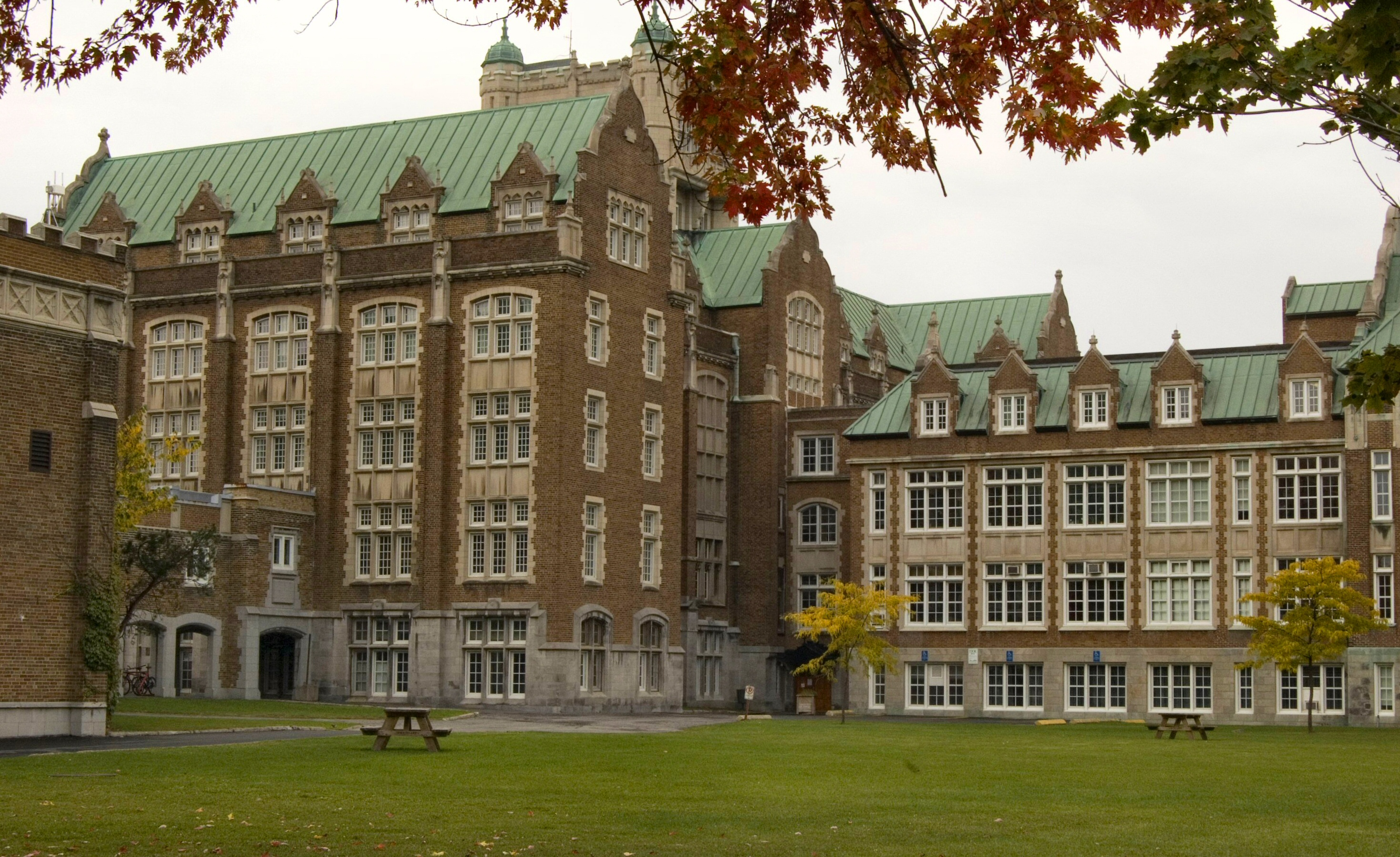
Concordia's Loyola Campus in the fall

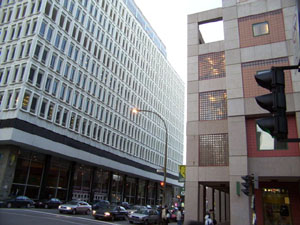
The Henry F. Hall Building (left) and the J.W. McConnell Library Building (right) on the Sir George Williams Campus

The university has two campuses, set approximately 7 km (4 miles) apart: Sir George Williams Campus in the downtown core of Montreal, in an area known as Quartier Concordia (around the Guy–Concordia Metro station), and Loyola Campus in the residential west-end district of Notre-Dame-de-Grâce. They are connected by free shuttle-bus service for students, faculty and staff.

Sir George Williams Campus
Bldg.	Address	Functions
EV	1515 Saint Catherine Street West	Engineering, Computer Science and Visual Arts Complex
GM	1550 De Maisonneuve Boulevard West	Guy–Concordia Metro Building (administration)
GN	1185 Saint Mathieu Street	Grey Nuns Building (student residence)
H	1455 De Maisonneuve Boulevard West	Henry F. Hall Building (social sciences, humanities and engineering)
LB	1400 De Maisonneuve Boulevard West	J.W. McConnell Building (professor offices and library)
MB	1450 Guy Street	John Molson School of Business (commerce and administration)

Loyola Campus
Bldg.	Address	Functions
AD	7141 Sherbrooke Street West	Administration Building
CJ	7141 Sherbrooke Street West	Communication Studies and Journalism Building
GE	7141 Sherbrooke Street West	Centre for Structural and Functional Genomics
HU	7141 Sherbrooke Street West	Applied Science Hub
SP	7141 Sherbrooke Street West	Richard J. Renaud Science Complex
VL	7141 Sherbrooke Street West	Georges P. Vanier Library Building
PC	7200 Sherbrooke Street West PERFORM Centre (Prevention, Evaluation, Rehabilitation and FORMation/training)	

=== Libraries, archives and galleries ===
Concordia University has three main library locations. The R. Howard Webster Library is located in the J.W. McConnell Building on the Sir George Williams Campus and the Georges P. Vanier Library is located on the Loyola Campus. On September 2, 2014, the Library opened the Grey Nuns Reading Room, a silent study space for Concordia students located in the former Chapel of the Invention of the Holy Cross. The Concordia Library houses several special and unique collections including the Azrieli Holocaust Collection and the Irving Layton Collection. Most special collections are located in the Vanier Library. The Library also maintains the university's institutional repository, Spectrum. The Library is a member of the Canadian Association of Research Libraries. The Library also has partnerships with the Canadian Research Knowledge Network and the Data Liberation Initiative.

Concordia's Henry F. Hall Building houses the Leonard and Bina Ellen Art Gallery. Samuel Schecter, an art enthusiast and businessman, set up two funds in 1962 to be used for the purchase of Canadian art at Sir George Williams University and at Loyola College (Montreal). When Sir George Williams University and Loyola College merged to form Concordia in 1974, their respective art collections were also combined. The collection of the Leonard and Bina Ellen Gallery consists of 1,800 paintings, sculptures, prints, photographs and videos, many of the works by 20th-century Canadian artists.

Concordia's Engineering, Computer Science and Visual Arts Complex houses the FOFA Gallery, a primary venue for exhibiting works by faculty, students and alumni of the Faculty of Fine Arts.

Concordia's Visual Arts Building on René Lévesque Boulevard houses the VAV Gallery, a student-run exhibition space seeking to highlight the work of undergraduate students in the Fine Arts department.

Concordia's Records Management and Archives stores official records of, or relating to, or people/activities connected with Concordia University and its two founding institutions. The collection consists of manuscripts, texts, photographs, audio-visual material and artifacts.

=== New buildings ===
In 2001, Concordia embarked on a mission to develop and expand the quality of the downtown campus, and to revive the west end in Montreal.

The university also acquired the historic Grey Nuns Mother House near its Sir George Williams Campus, for $18 million. Built in 1871, it would alone double the size of the current downtown campus. From 2007 to 2022, the university moved into the building in four separate phases. Concordia Residence Life currently houses nearly 250 students each year in the Grey Nuns Building. The dorm rooms are among the largest in the country, as many of the rooms have been transformed from when the section of the Grey Nuns Building was occupied by the Grey Nuns. The site was designated a National Historic Site of Canada in 2011.

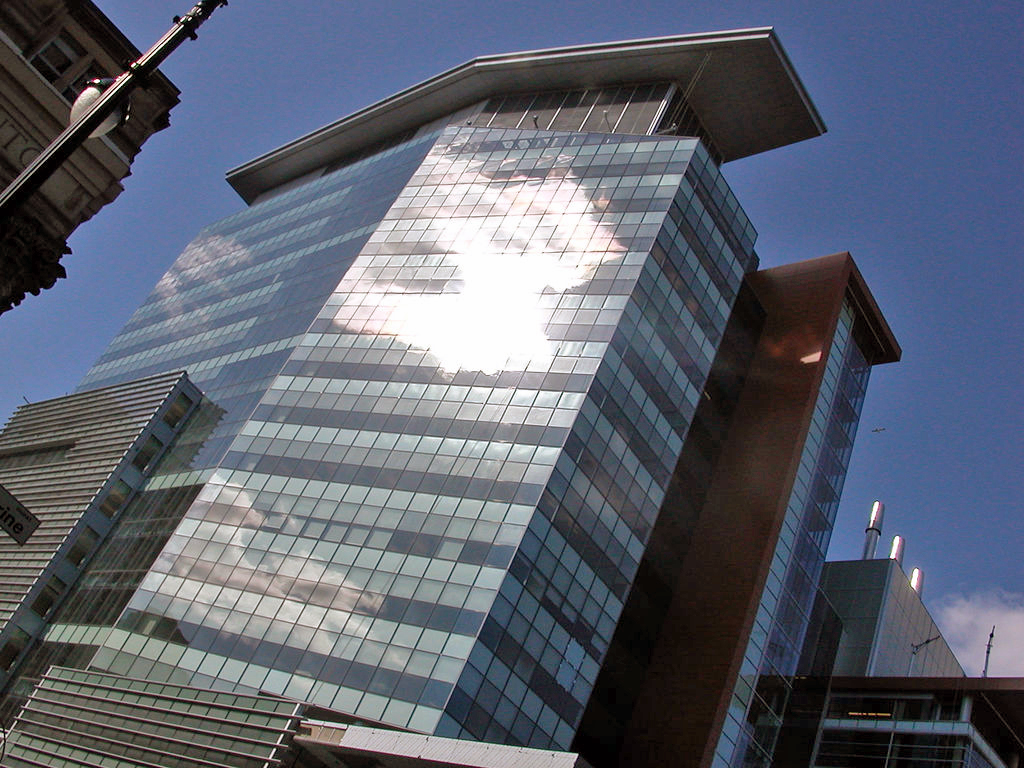
The Engineering, Computer Science and Visual Arts Integrated Complex on the corner of Saint Catherine Street and Guy Street

The Engineering, Computer Science and Visual Arts Integrated Complex (EV Building) at Saint Catherine Street and Guy Street was opened in September 2005. The building is directly connected to the Guy–Concordia Metro station and also houses Le Gym, a facility of Concordia's Department of Recreation and Athletics. Across the street, the 100-year-old TD Canada Trust building was donated to Concordia in 2005 by the Toronto-Dominion Bank.

Construction of the new John Molson Building (MB), the home of the John Molson School of Business located on the corner of Guy Street and De Maisonneuve Boulevard West, began in February 2007. At a ceremony at Concordia on October 30, 2006, the Quebec Minister of Education, Recreation and Sports, Jean-Marc Fournier, announced an investment of $60 million towards the construction of the new building. The government's $60 million represented about half of the total construction costs. Construction started on January 22, 2006, and the building was completed and opened in September 2009. The 15-story building now houses the John Molson School's about 9,100 full- and part-time students under the same roof for the first time. The departments of contemporary dance, theatre and music also moved into the new MB Building. It is connected to the EV Building by a tunnel under Guy Street.

In April 2010, a 120-metre tunnel completed the underground connections of the Guy-Concordia Metro station with the Henry F. Hall Building and the J.W. McConnell Building.

Concordia opened the Applied Science Hub on the Loyola Campus in December 2020. The $63.1-million state-of-the-art facility — built thanks to $36.7 million in support from the Government of Canada and the Government of Quebec — was strategically designed to enable interdisciplinary collaboration and research between faculty and students in the Faculty of Arts and Science, Gina Cody School of Engineering and Computer Science as well as the District 3 Innovation Centre.

=== Quartier Concordia ===
Quartier Concordia is a neighbourhood redevelopment project centred around Concordia University's Sir George Williams Campus in downtown Montreal. Bordered by Sherbrooke Street to the north, Saint Mathieu Street to the west, René Lévesque Boulevard to the south and Bishop Street to the east, the district is designed to be a green urban campus that will improve the use and quality of public places and spaces, student life on campus and transportation.

As part of the redesign, the small Norman Bethune Square was redesigned and enlarged. Sidewalks in the area were also widened, with additional trees.

Since 2010, a tunnel links the university's Henry F. Hall and J.W. McConnell buildings with the Guy-Concordia Metro station. However, a project to create a green space on Mackay Street was put on hold.

=== Sustainability ===
The university's long-term sustainability vision, goals and strategies have been consolidated into the Sustainability Action Plan. A first iteration of the Sustainability Action Plan was implemented starting in 2020 around five streams: food, waste, climate, research and curriculum. As part of the climate stream, the university has committed to achieving carbon neutrality by 2040. Efforts toward this goal include its PLAN/NET ZERO initiative, where the university is using its campuses and buildings as living labs for transitioning to renewable energy and testing new technologies to reduce its energy consumption and greenhouse-gas emissions.

== Administration and governance ==
=== Governance ===
Concordia is led by its president and vice-chancellor (referred to as the president), provost and vice-presidents. The Board of Governors and the Senate manage the university's affairs and academic integrity. The president and the senior leadership ensure transparency and accountability of the administration. The administration is supervised by the Board of Governors and Senate. Under the Charter of Concordia University, the university's highest governing body is the Board of Governors, which has final authority over the affairs of the university. The Senate derives its authority from the Board of Governors.

=== Academic units ===
Faculty / School
Faculty of Art and Science
Gina Cody School of Engineering and Computer Science
Faculty of Fine Arts
John Molson School of Business
School of Graduate Studies

The university has four faculties — Faculty of Arts and Science, Faculty of Fine Arts, Gina Cody School of Engineering and Computer Science and John Molson School of Business — as well as the School of Graduate Studies. In 2021, Concordia's Board of Governors approved the creation of the School of Health, an interdisciplinary unit that serves as a hub for the university's health-related research, education and community engagement. The respective faculties supervise the academic departments/institutes. For example, the Faculty of Art and Science oversees the Department of Applied Human Sciences and Simone de Beauvoir Institute.

=== Finances ===
In 2024–2025, Concordia received $643.9 million in operating revenue. Fifty-two per cent of the university's revenue comes from grants by the Government of Quebec, which are given based on the student population. As of 2024-2025, the university's foundation had $426.8 million in its endowment. In November 2017, Concordia launched the Campaign for Concordia. The campaign's original target was $250 million, since raised to $350 million. Its goal is to support the university's nine strategic directions that will advance Concordia's position as "Canada's next-generation university." In September 2025, the university closed its campaign by announcing it had surpassed its goal and raised $365 million.

== Academics ==
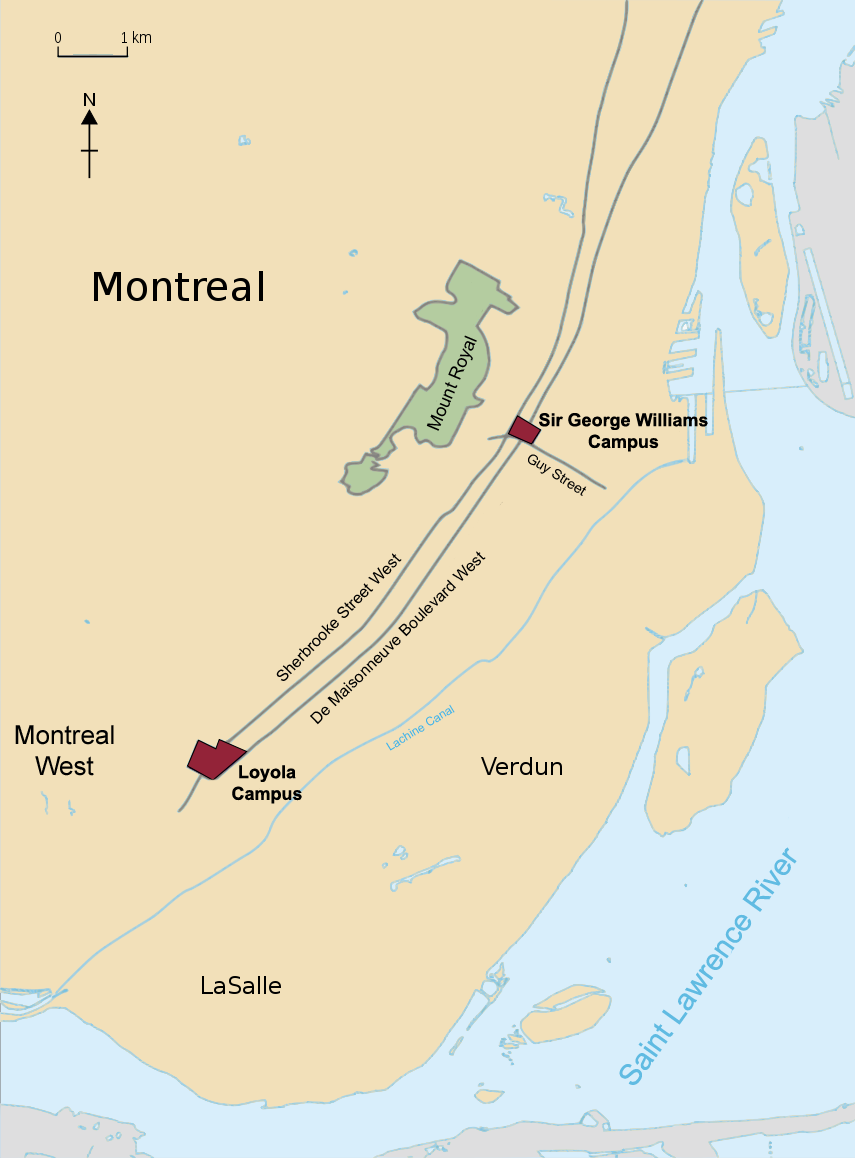
The location of Concordia's two campuses in Montreal

Students begin their university studies in September or, in some cases, in January or May. An undergraduate degree normally requires three or four years of full-time study, a master's one to three years, and a PhD at least four years. Diplomas and certificates usually take no longer than a year and a half to complete.

Concordia has more than 400 undergraduate programs under the Faculty of Arts and Science, the Gina Cody School of Engineering and Computer Science, the Faculty of Fine Arts and the John Molson School of Business. Students are normally enrolled in one of these faculties but may take courses from any of the others as part of their studies. Class sizes vary from 30 to 400 students.

The School of Graduate Studies offers about 120 programs leading to master's and doctoral degrees, and graduate diplomas and certificates for professionals seeking to upgrade their knowledge and skills.

Concordia Continuing Education offers university-level studies and training to those from diverse backgrounds and stages of life.

The Institute for Co-operative Education administers more than 70 bachelor's and master's programs in an alternating co-op work-study format. Concordia's co-op programs enable students to enrich their learning by participating in career-relevant 12–17-week full-time, paid work terms. Depending on their faculty and major, co-op students will usually graduate with a minimum of 12 months of academically relevant work experience. There are also Industrial Experience and Professional Experience options in certain disciplines that enable students to participate in a summer-only work term. Concordia is a member of the Canadian Association for Co-operative Education (CAFCE).

During the 2024–2025 academic year, there were 35,577 undergraduate students, 8,345 graduate students and 4,735 continuing education students enrolled at Concordia.

=== Faculty of Arts and Science ===
Concordia's Faculty of Arts and Science consists of 21 departments and seven colleges, schools and institutes in the humanities, sciences and social sciences at the undergraduate and graduate levels. There are 257 programs, offering more than 2,400 courses. There are 869 full-time and part-time faculty members. During the 2022–23 academic year, there were 18,502 undergraduate and graduate students enrolled in the faculty.

In addition to regular academic programs, the Faculty of Arts and Science also includes three colleges, two schools and two institutes. These are the Liberal Arts College, the Loyola College for Diversity and Sustainability, the School of Community and Public Affairs, the School of Irish Studies, the Science College, the Simone de Beauvoir Institute and the Concordia Institute for Canadian Jewish Studies.

The Loyola College for Diversity and Sustainability (formerly Loyola International College) is an interdisciplinary college on the Loyola Campus, the original site of Loyola College. It offers minor programs in Diversity and the Contemporary World and Sustainability Studies.

At the undergraduate level, the Faculty of Arts and Science offers both Bachelor of Arts (BA) and Bachelor of Science (BSc) programs with majors ranging from economics, political science and sociology to actuarial mathematics, biology and ecology.

=== Gina Cody School of Engineering and Computer Science ===
Its programs were ranked as one of the best in Canada in 2018 by Maclean's. The faculty offers more than 50 undergraduate and graduate-level programs in the following departments: Building, Civil and Environmental Engineering; Centre for Engineering in Society; Computer Science and Software Engineering; Concordia Institute for Information Systems Engineering; Chemical and Materials Engineering; Electrical and Computer Engineering, and Mechanical, Industrial and Aerospace Engineering. The engineering programs are all accredited by the Canadian Engineering Accreditation Board (CEAB). During the 2022–23 academic year, there were 11,848 undergraduate and graduate students enrolled in the faculty.

The Gina Cody School of Engineering and Computer Science, formerly known as Faculty of Engineering and Computer Science, is named after Concordia alumna Gina Cody, who donated $15 million to the university in 2018. In response, the university renamed its faculty of engineering and computer science in her honour, making it the first engineering school to be named after a woman in Canada and globally.

Troitsky Bridge Building Competition

The Troitsky Bridge Building Competition brings together engineering students from across Canada and parts of the United States. Teams of students representing their universities must build a 1-metre-long bridge using only regular popsicle sticks, toothpicks, dental floss, and white glue. A panel of judges grades the bridges based on originality and presentation while a hydraulic loading device is used to determine the maximum load and performance.

=== Faculty of Fine Arts ===
The Faculty of Fine Arts offers 26 undergraduate programs and 17 graduate programs. It includes nine departments and four research institutes. During the 2022–23 academic year, there were 3,982 undergraduate and graduate students enrolled in the faculty. Among the departments is The Mel Hoppenheim School of Cinema. It is informally identified as MHSoC, and offers study in the fields of film animation, film production and film studies. It is the largest, university-based centre for the study of film animation, film production and film studies in Canada. In 221 the Indigenous Future Research Center (IFRC) was established and directed by Jason Edward Lewis.

=== John Molson School of Business ===
The John Molson School of Business (formerly the Faculty of Commerce and Administration) offers 18 different programs at the undergraduate and graduate levels from five different departments. The departments are Accountancy, Finance, Marketing, Management and Supply Chain and Business Technology Management. During the 2022–23 academic year there were 9,097 undergraduate students and graduate students enrolled, and John Molson School has 61,000 alumni. The John Molson School is accredited by the Association to Advance Collegiate Schools of Business (AACSB). The business school is located in a LEED silver-certified building.

=== Rankings and reputation ===
University rankings

World rankings
- ARWU World: 601–700
- QS World: =465
- THE World: 501–600
- USNWR World: 665
- 21–22

Canadian rankings
- QS National: 17
- THE National: 20–24
- USNWR National: 21
- Maclean's Comprehensive: 10
- Maclean's Reputation: 18

The 2024 QS World University Rankings ranked the university 387th in the world. In the 2023 Academic Ranking of World Universities rankings, the university ranked between 501-600 in the world. The 2024 Times Higher Education World University Rankings placed Concordia between 501–600 in the world. In U.S. News & World Report 2022–23 global university rankings, the university placed 653rd in the world. The university was also ranked by Maclean's Canadian university rankings. In October 2023, Maclean's ranked Concordia 9th in Canada under its comprehensive universities category.

The university's John Molson School of Business was ranked among the top 10 Canadian business schools and the top 100 worldwide by The Economist in 2022. Moreover, Concordia was ranked seventh in Canada and 229th among world universities in the International Professional Classification of Higher Education Institutions, a worldwide ranking compiled by the École des Mines de Paris that uses as its sole criterion the number of graduates occupying the rank of chief executive officer at Fortune 500 companies.

== Student life ==
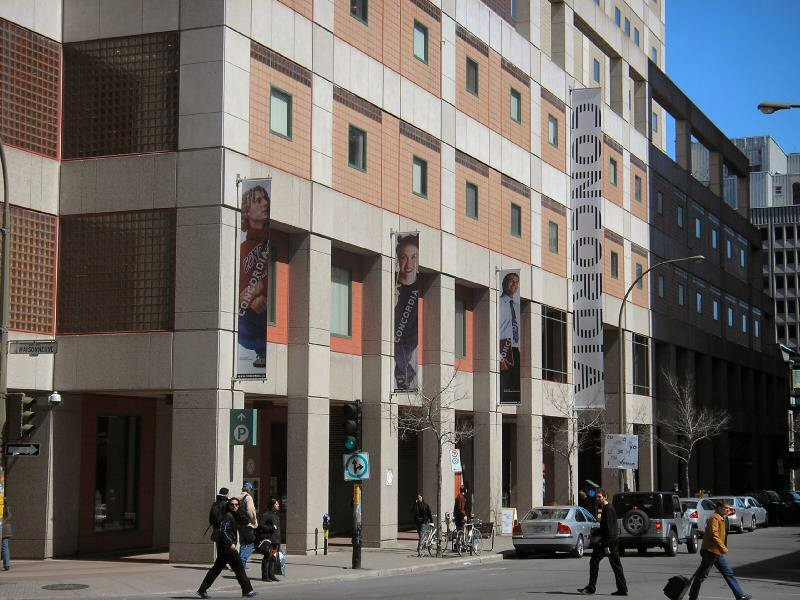
The J.W. McConnell Library Building on De Maisonneuve Boulevard

=== Student housing ===
Four residence buildings are available for students who wish to live on campus: Grey Nuns Residence, Jesuit Residence, Hingston Hall (HA) and Hingston Hall (HB).

For students who choose to live off campus, the Concordia Student Union's Off-Campus Housing and Job Bank (HoJo) offers classified ads, legal advice and safety resources.

=== Athletics ===
Concordia University's athletic teams are called the Concordia Stingers. They compete with other schools in U Sports, and more specifically, in the Quebec Student Sports Federation and the Quebec University Football League. The university has 10 varsity teams. In the fall, teams compete in Canadian football, men's and women's soccer, men's and women's rugby union and college wrestling. There are female and male wrestlers on the team from year to year, and they compete as one team. In the winter, teams compete in men's and women's ice hockey and men's and women's basketball.

The Concordia Stingers women's ice hockey team won the Canadian national championships in 1998, 1999, 2022 and 2024. In 2025-2026, the team won the provincial championship and finished second in the national championship.

=== Student organizations ===
The Concordia Student Union (CSU) represents undergraduate students. Its membership totals more than 35,000 students. Concordia students voted in favour of accreditation of their student union in a referendum in December 2000. As a result, the CSU is now legally accountable only to its student constituents.

Concordia University is home to local and international fraternities and sororities.

=== Student media ===
Concordia University has a campus radio station, CJLO, and a television station, CUTV. Concordia also has two student-run newspapers, The Link and The Concordian (which includes French-language pages run by L'Organe). The Concordian is a member of Canadian University Press (CUP); The Link left the CUP network in 2012.

== Student activism ==
=== Sir George Williams affair ===
The Sir George Williams affair (also referred to as "The Sir George Williams Computer Centre Incident") was a 1969 event at Sir George Williams University, now a part of Concordia University. It was the largest student occupation in Canadian history, and resulted (in 1969 currency) in $2 million of property damage. Among those arrested and convicted were Roosevelt Douglas, who later became Prime Minister of Dominica, and who was a son of one of the richest men in Dominica. Also arrested was Anne Cools, who later became a Canadian Senator. Deeply involved also was student Cheddi "Joey" Jagan Jr., who was of Indo-Guyanese and Ashkenazi Jewish descent, and the son of Cheddi Jagan, an American-educated dentist and former Premier and Chief Minister of British Guiana at the time, and his American wife Janet Jagan.

=== Strike of 1999 ===
As the 1990s progressed, student activism began growing, coming to a head in 1999 with the election of the first in a series of radical slates to the Concordia Student Union. Under the presidency of Rob Green, a referendum regarding a strike garnered 2,284 votes of support. This was an unusually strong show of support, as student governments at Concordia are often elected on the basis of less than 1,000 votes in their favour. The strike lasted from November 3 to 5 and targeted a range of issues, including student representation in the university senate, corporate presence and advertising on campus, and government. There were several demonstrations, where both protesters and police were reported to be injured.

=== Anti-Netanyahu riot ===
On September 9, 2002, a scheduled speech from the former (and later subsequent) Israeli Prime Minister Benjamin Netanyahu was cancelled following violent pro-Palestinian riots inside the Henry F. Hall Building. Protestors raised concerns about Israeli human rights abuses in the Palestinian territories, namely in the West Bank and the Gaza Strip. Netanyahu accused protestors of being supporters of terrorism. The event is depicted in a documentary named Confrontation at Concordia.

=== Arrests and class cancellations on October 7 attacks anniversary ===
In October 2025, two people were arrested on Concordia University's Sir George Williams Campus a day before the second anniversary of the October 7 attacks; one of them was carrying a metal bar and several incendiary devices. Subsequently, university president Graham Carr announced the "exceptional measure" of cancelling all in-person classes and activities at the campus on October 7, citing the risk of "extreme disruptions" and the potential for confrontation between pro-Palestinian demonstrators and counter-protesters. This followed a series of demonstrations, acts of vandalism, and other incidents on and around the university's campuses since the start of the Israel–Hamas war in 2023. The Service de police de la Ville de Montréal (SPVM) and the Sûreté du Québec (SQ) deployed a joint security operation at the university and other educational institutions in Montreal.

== See also ==
- Mel Hoppenheim School of Cinema
- Space Concordia
