= Buddy Squires =

American cinematographer

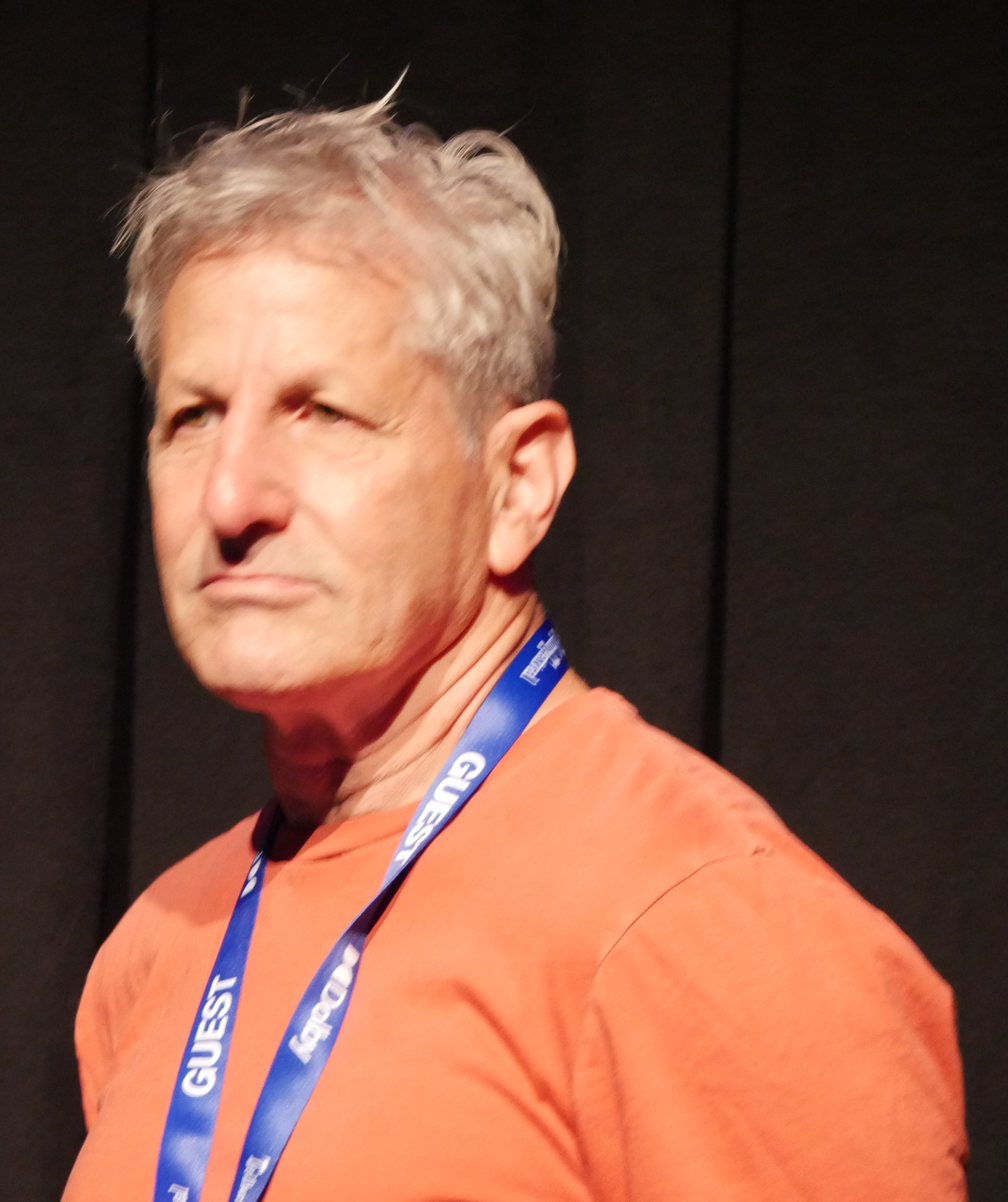
- Education: Hampshire College
- Occupation: Cinematographer
- Years active: 1981–present
- Organization: American Society of Cinematographers

Buddy Squires is a cinematographer known for his work with Ken Burns as a founding member of Florentine Films. His accolades include one Academy Award nomination, one Primetime Emmy Award win of eleven nominations, and the 2007 International Documentary Association’s Outstanding Documentary Cinematography Award.

== Style and approach ==
Describing his work on The Civil War, Squires noted "our job in the field is really to build the visual vocabulary that can then be handed off to the editors to weave into the story that’s being guided by the script.” "I think any visual artist is essentially reorganizing the world in front of them in a way that makes the most sense to the individual artist," Squires reflected in an interview with ProVideo Coalition. "When I’m shooting a scene I’m breaking down the scene into the elements I find the most interesting and figuring out how can I communicate what I see to others. It’s really just a process of translation and it doesn’t really matter if one is a painter or still photographer or cinematographer, one is always really rebuilding the world in a way that makes sense to oneself. That is what I do all the time."

== Filmography ==
Release year	Title	Credit(s)	Awards and nominations
1981	Brooklyn Bridge	Associate Producer	
1985	The Statue of Liberty	Producer	58th Academy Awards: Best Documentary Feature, nominated
1985	The Statue of Liberty	Producer	38th Primetime Emmy Awards: Outstanding Informational Special, nominated
1986	Huey Long	Cinematographer	
1988	The Children's Storefront	Cinematographer	
1988	Sentimental Women Need Not Apply: A History of the American Nurse	Cinematographer	
1988	Thomas Hart Benton	Cinematographer	
1989	The Congress	Cinematographer	
1989	No Applause, Just Throw Money	Cinematographer	
1989	Adam Clayton Powell	Cinematographer	
1989	The Other Side of the Moon	Cinematographer	
1990	Chimps: So Like Us	Cinematographer	
1990	The Civil War	Cinematographer	
1991	American Experience: Coney Island	Producer	
1992	Compassion in Exile: The Life of the 14th Dalai Lama	Cinematographer	
1992	High Lonesome: The Story of Bluegrass Music	Cinematographer	
1994-2010	Baseball	Cinematographer	47th Primetime Emmy Awards: Outstanding Individual Achievement - Informational Programming, nominated
1995	Listening to Children: A Moral Journey with Robert Coles	Director, Cinematographer	
1995	One Survivor Remembers	Cinematographer	47th Primetime Emmy Awards: Outstanding Individual Achievement - Informational Programming, nominated
1995	The Way West	Cinematographer	
1996	The West	Cinematographer	
1997	Hasten Slowly: The Journey of Sir Laurens van der Post	Cinematographer	
1997	Lewis & Clark: The Journey of the Corps of Discovery	Cinematographer	
1997	Heart of a Child	Cinematographer	
1997	Thomas Jefferson	Cinematographer	
1998	Out of the Past	Cinematographer	
1998	Frank Lloyd Wright	Cinematographer	
1998	America's Endangered Species: Don't Say Good-bye	Cinematographer	50th Primetime Emmy Awards: Outstanding Achievement In Non-Fiction Programming - Cinematography, won
1999	The Last Days of Kennedy and King	Cinematographer	
1999-2003	New York: A Documentary Film	Cinematographer	52nd Primetime Emmy Awards: Outstanding Cinematography in Non-Fiction Programming, nominated
2001	Jazz	Cinematographer	53rd Primetime Emmy Awards: Outstanding Cinematography for Non-Fiction Programming, nominated
2002	Ansel Adams: A Documentary Film	Cinematographer	54th Primetime Emmy Awards: Outstanding Cinematography for Non-Fiction Programming (Single or Multi-Camera), nominated
