= Gerald Early =

American essayist and professor (born 1952)

Gerald L. Early
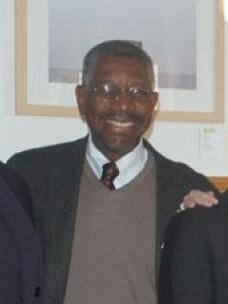
- Early in 2013
- Born: Gerald Lyn Early; April 21, 1952 (age 74); Philadelphia, Pennsylvania, U.S.
- Education: University of Pennsylvania (BA); Cornell University (MA, PhD)
- Occupations: Professor; Author
- Employer: Washington University in St. Louis
- Known for: American literature; African-American culture; Non-fiction prose, Baseball, Jazz music, Prizefighting, Motown
- Spouse: Ida Early (1977–present)
- Children: 2
- Website: Faculty page for Gerald Early at Washington University in St. Louis

Gerald Lyn Early (born April 21, 1952) is an American essayist and American culture critic. He is currently the Merle Kling Professor of Modern letters, of English, African studies, African-American studies, American culture studies, and Director, Center for Joint Projects in the Humanities and Social Sciences at Washington University in St. Louis.

He also served as a consultant on Ken Burns' documentary films Baseball, Jazz, Unforgivable Blackness: The Rise and Fall of Jack Johnson, The War, and Muhammad Ali. He is a regular commentator on NPR's Fresh Air. His essays have appeared in numerous editions of The Best American Essays series. He writes on topics as diverse as American literature, the Korean War, African-American culture, Afro-American autobiography, non-fiction prose, baseball, jazz, prizefighting, Motown, Miles Davis, Muhammad Ali and Sammy Davis Jr.

In 2024, he was elected to the American Philosophical Society.

== Biography ==
Early was born on April 21, 1952, in Philadelphia, the son of Henry Early and Florence Fernandez Oglesby. His father, a baker, died when Early was nine months old, leaving his mother, a preschool teacher, to raise him and his two sisters on her own. Living in a poor area of the city, Early grew up befriending members of the Fifth and the South Street gangs, though he never became a member himself. Instead he focused on scholarly pursuits, graduating cum laude from the University of Pennsylvania in 1974. During Early's undergraduate years, he was introduced to the writings of Amiri Baraka and later credited the poet and playwright with influencing his own work. Early developed much of his writing style through involvement with the university newspaper. Ironically, his first major piece was a journalistic foray into the gang-related murder of a cousin.

After earning his B.A. degree, Early remained in Philadelphia, where he became employed by the city government. He also spent six months monitoring gang activities through the Crisis Intervention Network, before resuming his course work at Cornell University, where he eventually earned a doctorate in English literature in 1982. Early landed his first teaching job as an assistant professor of black studies in Arts and Sciences at Washington University in St. Louis in 1982. He steadily rose to a full professorship in both the English and the renamed African and Afro-American studies departments by 1990.

In 2013, Early was inducted into the St. Louis Walk of Fame. On February 19, 2022, the Chicago suburb of Park Forest rededicated Early Street, initially named for the Confederate general, in Gerald Early's honor in an effort to celebrate the historic diversity of the village.

== Works ==
- Tuxedo Junction: Essays on American Culture (1989)
- Life with Daughters: Watching the Miss America Pageant (1990)
- The Culture of Bruising: Essays on Prizefighting, Literature, and Modern American Culture (1994)
- Daughters: On Family and Fatherhood (1994) (memoir)
- One Nation Under a Groove: Motown & American Culture (1994) (music history)
- How the War in the Streets Is Won: Poems on the Quest of Love and Faith (Time Being Books, 1995) (poetry)
- Yes I Can! The Sammy Davis Jr. Story (2001) nominated for a Grammy (Best Album Notes)
- Rhapsodies in Black: Music and Words From the Harlem Renaissance (2002) (nominated for a Grammy Award for Best Album Notes)
- Play Harder: The Triumph of Black Baseball in America (2025)

== Editing work ==
- Lure and Loathing: Essays on Race, Identity and the Ambivalence of Assimilation (1993)
- Ain't But a Place: An Anthology of African American Writings About St. Louis (1998)
- Body Language: Writers on Sport (1998)
- The Muhammad Ali Reader (1998)
- Miles Davis and American Culture (2001)
- The Sammy Davis, Jr. Reader (2001)
- Black America in the 1960s (2003)
- My Soul's High Song: The Collected Writings of Countee Cullen (1991)
- Speech and Power: The African-American Essay in Its Cultural Content (1993)
