= Sarah Botstein =

American documentary film producer

- Education: Barnard College (BA)
- Parent: Leon Botstein

Sarah Botstein is an American documentary film producer. She has worked with Ken Burns and Lynn Novick on various documentaries since 2001. Botstein, Ken Burns, and David P. Schmidt directed the six-part PBS miniseries The American Revolution released November 2025.

== Biography ==
Botstein's father is Leon Botstein, president of Bard College since 1975.

Botstein graduated from Barnard College in 1994 with a Bachelor of Arts degree, majoring in American Studies, with a focus on the post-World War II era.

In 2018, she was nominated for a BAFTA for The Vietnam War with Ken Burns, Lynn Novick, and Geoffrey Ward.

== Filmography ==
=== As producer ===
- Jazz (2001)
- The War (2007)
- Prohibition (2011)
- The Vietnam War (2017)
- College Behind Bars (2019)
- Hemingway (2021)

=== As director ===
- The U.S. and the Holocaust (2022)
- The American Revolution (2025)
