= The American Revolution (TV series) =

2025 television documentary miniseries

- Release poster
- Genre: Documentary
- Created by: Ken Burns
- Written by: Geoffrey C. Ward
- Directed by: Ken Burns; Sarah Botstein; David Schmidt
- Narrated by: Peter Coyote
- Composer: David Cieri
- Country of origin: United States
- Original language: English
- No. of episodes: 6

Production
- Executive producer: Ken Burns
- Producers: Ken Burns; Sarah Botstein; David Schmidt
- Cinematography: Buddy Squires
- Editors: Tricia Reidy; Charles E. Horton; Maya Mumma; Craig Mellish
- Running time: 715 minutes/11 hours 55 minutes (6 episodes)
- Production companies: Florentine Films; WETA-TV

Original release
- Network: PBS
- Release: November 16 – November 21, 2025

The American Revolution is a 2025 television documentary miniseries about the American Revolution directed by Ken Burns, Sarah Botstein, and David Schmidt. The series is a six-part, twelve-hour documentary. It premiered on PBS on November 16, 2025.

== Premise ==
The documentary miniseries covers the events concerning the American Revolution during the time periods leading up to the Revolution (from May 1754), the years of the Revolution itself (independence declared in 1776), followed by the immediate aftermath of the Revolution in the early years of the new nation and its new government from May 1780 and beyond.

== Cast ==
=== Interviewees ===
- Rick Atkinson – author
- Maggie Blackhawk – legal scholar
- Darren Bonaparte – writer
- Nathaniel Philbrick – writer
- Stacy Schiff – writer

==== Historians ====
- Friederike Baer
- Bernard Bailyn
- Ned Blackhawk
- Christopher Brown
- Vincent Brown
- Colin G. Calloway
- Stephen Conway
- Philip J. Deloria
- Erica Dunbar
- Kathleen DuVal
- Joseph Ellis
- Annette Gordon-Reed
- William Hogeland
- Maya Jasanoff
- Jane Kamensky
- Edward Lengel
- Iris de Rode
- Alan Taylor
- Michael John Witgen
- Gordon S. Wood
- Serena Zabin

=== Voices ===
- Peter Coyote (narrator)
- Adam Arkin (voice of James Parker, Private Ashbel Green, Andrew Hunter, Samuel Shaw, Enoch Anderson, Timothy Dwight, Robert Morris)
- Tony Beck (voice of Ludwig von Closen)
- Leon Dische Becker (voice of Johann Friedrich von Bardeleben, Johann Conrad Doehla, and Leopold Philip de Heister)
- Jeremiah Bitsui (voice of Twethorechte and Stockbridge Petitioners)
- Corbin Bleu (voice of John Joseph Henry, Daniel McCurtin, Nathaniel Bacheller and Isaac Granger)
- Kenneth Branagh (voice of Henry Clinton, British General Thomas Gage, Samuel Graves, Samuel Johnson, American General Charles Lee, Joseph Reed, Friedrich Adolf Riedesel, George Croghan, and Peter Stephen Du Ponceau)
- Josh Brolin (voice of General George Washington)
- Bill Camp (voice of Capt. Jabez Fitch)
- Tantoo Cardinal (voice of Mary Jemison and the delegation of Cherokee Women)
- Josh Charles (voice of Joseph Warren, John Peters, David Ramsay)
- Martin Czembor (voice of Georg Daniel Flohr)
- Hugh Dancy (voice of Hugh Percy, General John Burgoyne, Banastre Tarleton, Comte de Vergennes)
- Claire Danes (voice of Abigail Adams)
- Jeff Daniels (voice of Thomas Jefferson)
- Keith David (voice of Theodore Romeyn)
- Hope Davis (voice of Elizabeth Drinker)
- Marcus Davis-Orrom (voice of John Barker and William Bamford)
- Bruce Davison (voice of John P. Becker, Charles Inglis and Samuel Webb)
- Alden Ehrenreich (voice of Joseph Plumb Martin)
- Craig Ferguson (voice of Lord North, John Murray (Lord Dunmore), John Paul Jones, John Purrier, Martin Hunter, and William Harcourt)
- Morgan Freeman (voice of James Forten)
- Christian Friedel (voice of Johann Ewald and Friedrich von Munchausen)
- Paul Giamatti (voice of John Adams)
- Domhnall Gleeson (voice of Loftus Cliffe, Roger Lamb, John MacPherson, John Bowater, and William Barton)
- Amanda Gorman (voice of Phillis Wheatley)
- Michael Greyeyes (voice of Thayendanegea/Joseph Brant and Solomon Uhhaunauwaunmut)
- Jonathan Groff (voice of Erkuries Beatty)
- Charlotte Hacke (voice Friederike Riedesel, Hannah Davis, Lucy Knox, Martha Reed, Lois Peters)
- Tom Hanks (voice of Andrew Eliot, Josiah Bartlett, Isaac Bangs, Reverend David Griffith, Justice Thomas Jones, Ezra Tilden, Dr. Albigence Waldo, Ebenezer Denny)
- Ethan Hawke (voice of General Anthony Wayne and John Andrews)
- Maya Hawke (voice of Betsy Ambler)
- Lucas Hedges (voice of Ebenezer Fletcher, John Laurens and Garrett Watts)
- Josh Hutcherson (voice of James Potter Collins and Jabez Campfield)
- LaTanya Richardson Jackson (voice of Elizabeth Freeman and Judith Jackson)
- Samuel L. Jackson (voice of Caesar Sarter, Lemuel Haynes, and Boston King)
- Gene Jones (voice of Landon Carter, Thomas Nelson, Moses Kirkland, and Thomas Young)
- Michael Keaton (voice of General Benedict Arnold)
- Joe Keery (voice of John Greenwood)
- Joel Kinnaman (voice of Rev. Samuel Seabury, Nils Collin, Thomas Hutchinson)
- Tracy Letts (voice of Elbridge Gerry)
- Damian Lewis (voice of King George III, Nicholas Cresswell, Major John Andre, Bartholomew James)
- Laura Linney (voice of Sarah Logan Fisher, Ann Holton, Sarah Morris Mifflin, Eliza Wilkinson, Eliza Lucas Pickney)
- Josh Lucas (voice of George Rogers Clark, John Glover, and Drury Mathias)
- Michael Mando (voice of Marquis de Lafayette)
- Carolyn McCormick (voice of Hannah Griffiths, Hannah Winthrop, and Esther Reed)
- Reece McCullagh (voice of Patrick Ferguson)
- Lindsay Mendez (voice of Catharine Macaulay and Mary M. Campbell)
- Tobias Menzies (voice of Edmund Burke, Ambrose Serle, General Lord Charles Cornwallis, William Pitt, and Horatio Gates)
- Olivier Mercier (voice of Cromot du Bourg)
- Joe Morton (voice of Elisha Bostwick and Elias Dayton)
- Edward Norton (voice of Benjamin Rush, Philip Vickers Fithian, and Philip Schuyler)
- David Oyelowo (voice of Olaudah Equiano, Sam)
- Mandy Patinkin (voice of Benjamin Franklin)
- Wendell Pierce (voice of William Read)
- Jon Proudstar (voice of Canassatego, Chainbreaker, Old Smoke and Shawnee Delegate)
- Matthew Rhys (voice of Thomas Paine)
- Liev Schreiber (voice of Samuel Adams, Nathanael Greene, and Lewis Beebe)
- Chaske Spencer (voice of Tsi’yu-gunsini and Shingas)
- Dan Stevens (voice of General William Howe and Comte de Rochambeau)
- Meryl Streep (voice of Mercy Otis Warren)
- Yul Vazquez (voice of Henry Knox and José de Gálvez)

== Episodes ==
No.	Title	Original air date	Length
1	"In Order to Be Free (May 1754 – May 1775)"	November 16, 2025	1hr 56min
2	"An Asylum for Mankind (May 1775 – July 1776)"	November 17, 2025	2hrs 4min
3	"The Times That Try Men's Souls (July 1776 – January 1777)"	November 18, 2025	1hr 55min
4	"Conquer by a Drawn Game (January 1777 – February 1778)"	November 19, 2025	1hr 56min
5	"The Soul of All America (December 1777 – May 1780)"	November 20, 2025	1hr 54min
6	"The Most Sacred Thing (May 1780 – onward)"	November 21, 2025	2hrs 11min

No.	Title	Original release date	US viewers (millions)
1	"In Order to Be Free (May 1754 – May 1775)"	November 16, 2025	N/A
This episode begins with American Colonists opposing the efforts by the British Crown and Parliament to seize greater control in North America, escalating simmering tensions over land, taxes, and sovereignty into violent confrontation. Runtime: 116 minutes
2	"An Asylum for Mankind (May 1775 – July 1776)"	November 17, 2025	N/A
Following increasing tensions with the Crown concerning taxation without representation, representatives of the colonists appoint Thomas Jefferson to draft the Declaration of Independence on July 4, 1776 indicating the enumerated reasons for repudiation of the Crown and the establishment of self-government in the now fully self-asserted and independent colonies. Runtime: 124 minutes
3	"The Times That Try Men's Souls (July 1776 – January 1777)"	November 18, 2025	N/A
Runtime: 116 minutes
4	"Conquer by a Drawn Game (January 1777 – February 1778)"	November 19, 2025	N/A
Runtime: 115 minutes
5	"The Soul of All America (December 1777 – May 1780)"	November 20, 2025	
Runtime: 112 minutes
6	"The Most Sacred Thing (May 1780 – Onward)"	November 21, 2025	N/A
Runtime: 130 minutes

== Production ==
The filmmakers wrote in The Atlantic that the series was filmed for 165 days at more than 150 locations, with weather often dictating logistics; they chased the solar eclipse of April 8, 2024 to the Adirondacks and rapidly staged winter shoots in Providence, Rhode Island, Charlestown, New Hampshire, Tivoli, New York, and Philadelphia over the Martin Luther King Jr. Day weekend. They also reported extensive collaboration with re-enactors, including the Jersey Greys, who drilled at night in a snowstorm and built what the team believes is the largest redoubt in North America for the production.

According to the filmmakers, the absence of photography of the period led them to emphasize first-person testimony, period imagery, landscape cinematography, and limited-face reenactments to convey the "uncertainty" of the era. The team said it had created over 100 new maps under geographer Charles E. Frye, aligning scanned 18th-century cartography to modern satellite imagery and correcting for altered rivers, coastal infill, and missing colonial borders; Native nations and towns are prominently marked alongside settler sites.

== Release ==
The release of the series was preceded by a half-hour preview entitled The American Revolution: An Inside Look. The preview aired on PBS from August 2025 on an on-going basis to introduce the series. The series was promoted by PBS with a nationwide tour and site-specific screenings at Revolutionary War locations.

== Reception ==
On the review aggregator website Rotten Tomatoes, 96% of 24 critics' reviews are positive, with an average rating of 9.10/10. The website's consensus reads: "Examining how America's founding turned the world upside-down as the thirteen British colonies on the Atlantic Coast rose in rebellion, won their independence and established a new form of government that radically reshaped the continent." Metacritic assigned a score of 80 out of 100 based on 16 critics, indicating "generally favorable" reviews.

Writing in Vanity Fair, Jordan Hoffman characterizes the series as "loaded with characters, ideas, and perspectives" that make "history feel urgent and new," and highlighted its "stacked ensemble" of voice performers. Hoffman also notes the film's "stately pace" and attention to Loyalists and lesser known participants in the events.

Jennifer Schuessler in The New York Times argues that as a documentary it "aim[s] to strip away the barnacles of sentimentality and nostalgia" surrounding the founding of the United States. Schuessler noted that the series arrives "in the middle of a culture war," pointing to its "frank discussions of slavery and Native American dispossession" and its depiction of the Revolution as a "hyper-violent civil war that divided families and communities." She observed that the film "doesn't demonize Loyalists" and that its presentation of Native Americans as "members of powerful nations faced with complex choices" may be "the most eye-opening part of the documentary." The article also reported that Burns's "insistence on both inspiration and complexity has played well with audiences, including those well outside the PBS orbit."

Daniel Fienberg describes The American Revolution in The Hollywood Reporter as "smart, thorough, [and] sincere in intent," calling it "rousing, if repetitive." He wrote that the series is "patriotic, pragmatic and familiar," noting that it "fits snugly into the unprecedented tapestry that Burns has been weaving since Brooklyn Bridge." Fienberg praised its attention to "the internal conflicts and hypocrisies of the American Revolution," particularly its treatment of "the celebrations of equality that excluded Blacks and Native Americans," while also remarking that the production "relies heavily on familiar Burnsian tracking shots and zooms" and can feel "dry and a little languid." He concluded that despite its flaws, the series conveys "the optimism that we sometimes forget as we squirm through the latest evolution or devolution of the American experiment."

Writing for Politico, Nathaniel Moore suggests that Burns frames the series as a unifying civic project grounded in a "shared past," and described the cut he saw as heavy on factual narration while inclusive of voices often omitted from Revolutionary histories; he concluded that the film was "entertaining enough" to draw multigenerational audiences together at public screenings.

In The New Yorker, Jill Lepore wrote, "[What] distinguishes "The American Revolution" is its fidelity to the best and most sophisticated scholarship—searing, challenging, and explosively interesting, especially as intellectual history. The Trump Administration won't 'restore truth and sanity to American history.' But this film does." She calls the show "a canvas, part Bruegel, part Goya, a political carousel, a teeming, moving, terrifying story," and quotes the historian Vincent Brown, who says in the program's commentary, "If one wants a national origin story that's clean and neat and tells you very clearly who the good guys are and who the bad guys are, The American Revolution is not that story."

== See also ==
- List of television series and miniseries about the American Revolution
- List of films about the American Revolution
- Founding Fathers of the United States
