= Leonardo da Vinci (2024 film) =

- Directed by: Ken Burns
- Written by: Sarah Burns; David McMahon
- Narrated by: Keith David
- Cinematography: Buddy Squires
- Music by: Caroline Shaw
- Release date: November 18, 2024
- Running time: 240 minutes
- Country: United States
- Language: English

Leonardo da Vinci is a 2024 documentary film about Leonardo da Vinci directed by Ken Burns, featuring a soundtrack composed by Caroline Shaw.

== Release ==
The film premiered in two parts on Nine PBS on November 18 and 19, 2024.

== Reception ==
Leonardo da Vinci has received positive reviews from critics. Margaret Lyons of The New York Times called it, "Thorough and engrossing."

== See also ==
- Cultural references to Leonardo da Vinci
