= The Address (film) =

- Written by: Ken Burns
- Directed by: Ken Burns
- Narrated by: Edward "Ned" Shaw, George "Geo" Gould, and others
- Country of origin: United States

Production
- Producers: Ken Burns; Christopher Darling
- Cinematography: Lindsay Taylor Jackson; David Burton Lovejoy
- Editor: Craig Mellish
- Running time: 84 minutes
- Production company: Florentine Films

Original release
- Release: April 15, 2014

The Address is a 2014 documentary film for television written, co-produced and directed by Ken Burns. The documentary was released on April 15, 2014.

== Synopsis ==
The Address follows a group of students from The Greenwood School, a boarding school in Putney, Vermont for boys in Grades 6-12 with special needs, such as dyslexia and ADHD as they prepare to recite the Gettysburg Address.

The documentary follows the students in their day-to-day lives at the boarding school, as they each prepare for the recital. The boys receive a special coin upon successfully reciting the speech. Burns used various students from the school to narrate historical background throughout the film.

== Reviews ==
Brian Lowry of Variety said, "[I]t surely must have felt like something of a respite to play small ball for a while with 'The Address', profiling a school for teenage boys with learning disabilities in Vermont, and the children for whom memorizing and reciting the Gettysburg Address is a rite of passage. Despite its relative lack of heft, the project is reasonably effective in providing a window into these kids' worlds, however narrow the aperture might be."
