= Prohibition (miniseries) =

- Genre: Documentary
- Written by: Geoffrey C. Ward
- Directed by: Ken Burns; Lynn Novick
- Narrated by: Peter Coyote
- Composer: Wynton Marsalis
- Country of origin: United States
- No. of episodes: 3

Production
- Producers: Sarah Botstein; Lynn Novick; Ken Burns
- Cinematography: Buddy Squires with: Allen Moore; Stephen McCarthy
- Editors: Tricia Reidy; Erik Ewers; Ryan Gifford
- Running time: 5 1/2 hours
- Production companies: Florentine Films; WETA; Prohibition Film Project; National Endowment for the Humanities

Original release
- Network: PBS
- Release: October 2 – October 4, 2011

Prohibition is a 2011 American television documentary miniseries directed by Ken Burns and Lynn Novick with narration by Peter Coyote. The series originally aired on PBS between October 2, 2011 and October 4, 2011. It was funded in part by the National Endowment for the Humanities. It draws heavily from the 2010 book Last Call: The Rise and Fall of Prohibition by Daniel Okrent.

== Synopsis ==
Prohibition describes how the consumption and effect of alcoholic beverages in the United States were connected to many different cultural forces including immigration, women's suffrage, and the income tax. Eventually the Temperance movement led to the passing of Prohibition, the 18th Amendment to the U.S. Constitution. Widespread defiance of the law, uneven and unpopular enforcement, and violent crime associated with the illegal trade in alcohol caused increasing dissatisfaction with the amendment, eventually leading to its repeal 13 years later.

== Episodes ==
No.	Title	Original release date
1	"A Nation of Drunkards"	October 2, 2011
The episode describes how immigration, alcoholism, women's suffrage and the temperance movements led up to the passing of the 18th Amendment, Prohibition. Runtime: 96 minutes
2	"A Nation of Scofflaws"	October 3, 2011
This episode addresses how the enforcement of Prohibition was inconsistent and caused unintended consequences, including making criminals of a large portion of the population. Runtime: 112 minutes
3	"A Nation of Hypocrites"	October 4, 2011
This episode follows the gradual swing towards repeal of Prohibition as the Great Depression focuses attention on other priorities. Runtime: 106 minutes

== Cast ==
=== Voice actors ===
- Adam Arkin
- Philip Bosco
- Patricia Clarkson (Carrie Nation)
- Kevin Conway
- Peter Coyote (narrator)
- Blythe Danner
- Paul Giamatti (George Remus)
- Tom Hanks (Newspaper, Roy Olmstead)
- Jeremy Irons
- Samuel L. Jackson
- John Lithgow (H. L. Mencken)
- Josh Lucas
- Amy Madigan
- Carolyn McCormick
- Oliver Platt (Al Capone)
- Campbell Scott (F. Scott Fitzgerald)
- Frances Sternhagen
- Joanne Tucker
- Sam Waterston (newspaper)

=== Interviewed consultants ===
- Zeke Alpern
- Jonathan Eig
- Noah Feldman
- Pete Hamill
- Edwin T. Hunt Jr
- Michael Lerner
- William Leuchtenburg
- Martin E. Marty
- Catherine Gilbert Murdock
- Daniel Okrent
- Ruth P. Smith
- John Paul Stevens
- Margot Loines Wilkie
- Joshua M. Zeitz

== Critical response ==
The documentary received mostly positive reviews. Neil Genzlinger of New York Times wrote that "You can hear history talking directly to the Americans of 2011 all through 'Prohibition,' an absorbing five-and-a-half-hour documentary by Ken Burns and Lynn Novick ... Especially now, the story of America's disastrous experiment with banning alcoholic beverages seems made for Santayana's phrase about learning from the past or being condemned to repeat it." Hank Stuever of Washington Post wrote that "Burns has the similar gift of that rare history professor who can captivate even the most reluctant student by bringing the material to life." Troy Patterson of Slate wrote that "Prohibition provides a very fine analytic survey of the noble experiment."
