= Unforgivable Blackness: The Rise and Fall of Jack Johnson =

- DVD cover
- Written by: Geoffrey C. Ward
- Directed by: Ken Burns
- Narrated by: Keith David
- Music by: Wynton Marsalis
- Country of origin: United States
- Original language: English

Production
- Producers: Paul Barnes; Ken Burns; David Schaye
- Cinematography: Stephen McCarthy; Buddy Squires
- Editors: Paul Barnes; Erik Ewers
- Running time: 214 Minutes; 220 Minutes (DVD version)
- Production companies: WETA; Florentine Films

Original release
- Network: PBS
- Release: January 17 – January 18, 2005

Unforgivable Blackness: The Rise and Fall of Jack Johnson is a 2005 biographical documentary by filmmaker Ken Burns, based on the 2004 nonfiction book of the same name by Geoffrey C. Ward. It describes the life story of Jack Johnson, the first African-American Heavyweight Boxing Champion of the World. It also describes racism and social inequality during the Jim Crow era, against which Johnson struggled.

== Production ==
It is narrated by Keith David, with a soundtrack by Wynton Marsalis and with Samuel L. Jackson as the voice of Jack Johnson. Alan Rickman also contributed his voice to the documentary. Stanley Crouch appears, offering commentary, including a quote from Johnson responding to a question from a white woman about black people, "We eat cold eels and think distant thoughts." This documentary is an example of a style frequently used by Burns, where a range of authorities gives voiceovers to contribute particular details. Stanley Crouch is the primary authority, offering personal recollections.

The film was produced by David Schaye, Paul Barnes and Ken Burns (Executive Producer) for Florentine Films.

== Release and reception ==
The documentary was first broadcast on PBS in two parts, on January 17 and January 18, 2005.

In 2005, the film earned Ken Burns an Emmy Award for Outstanding Directing for Nonfiction Programming. Geoffrey C. Ward won an Emmy for Outstanding Writing for Nonfiction Programming. Keith David won an Emmy for Outstanding Voice-Over Performance.

== See also ==
- The Great White Hope, Howard Sackler's 1967 dramatization of Jack Johnson's life.
- List of boxing films
