= Mark Twain (film) =

2001 documentary film on the life of Mark Twain by Ken Burns

- Written by: Dayton Duncan; Geoffrey C. Ward
- Directed by: Ken Burns
- Narrated by: Keith David
- Country of origin: United States

Production
- Producers: Pam Tubridy Baucom; Ken Burns
- Running time: 212 minutes
- Production companies: Florentine Films; WETA

Original release
- Release: January 14, 2002

Mark Twain is a documentary film on the life of Mark Twain, also known as Samuel Clemens, produced by Ken Burns in 2001 which aired on Public Broadcasting System on January 14 and 15, 2002. Burns attempted to capture both the public and private persona of Mark Twain from his birth to his death. The film was narrated by Keith David.

== Voice actors and subject interviews ==
The voice of Mark Twain was provided by Kevin Conway and the voice of Olivia Langdon Clemens was portrayed by Blythe Danner. Other voice work was provided by actors Philip Bosco, Carolyn McCormick, Amy Madigan, Cynthia Nixon, and Tim Clark. The film also includes interviews with playwright Arthur Miller, novelist and Twain biographer Ron Powers, writer William Styron, poet Russell Banks, historian John Boyer (executive director of the Mark Twain House), Harvard University professor Jocelyn Chadwick, Stanford University English literature professor Shelley Fisher Fishkin, comedian and civil rights activist Dick Gregory, actor Hal Holbrook, animator and actor Chuck Jones, and Mark Twain scholar Laura Skandera Trombley.

== Critical assessment ==
Mark Twain Legacy Scholar Barbara Schmidt asserts on her website twainquotes.com that some artistic license was taken, resulting in some historical inaccuracies and misrepresentations. She also notes that some of these errors are the result of the Twain scholarship during the time that the documentary was made, and that more recent scholarship has revealed some of the factual errors that are in the documentary. Schmidt's website twainquotes.com is widely cited in academic publications on Twain and is highly regarded as an authoritative resource within Twain research.

Film critic Caryn James wrote the following in her review in The New York Times:

"No writer was ever more sardonic about American culture than Twain, and no filmmaker is more earnest than Ken Burns. In Mark Twain that makes for a maddening collision between Twain's ironic sensibility and Mr. Burns's familiar, sentimental style. Twain is forced into the Burns cookie cutter here, complete with the unironic sound of Sweet Betsy from Pike, fiddled relentlessly in the background."

== See also ==
- Mark Twain in popular culture
