= The Central Park Five (film) =

2012 documentary film directed by Ken Burns

- Theatrical release poster
- Directed by: Ken Burns; Sarah Burns; David McMahon
- Production company: Sundance Selects; WETA; Florentine Films; PBS; The Central Park Five Film Project
- Distributed by: Sundance Selects
- Release dates: May 24, 2012 (Cannes Film Festival); November 23, 2012 (United States)
- Running time: 119 min
- Country: United States
- Language: English

The Central Park Five is a 2012 documentary film about the Central Park jogger case, directed by documentary filmmaker Ken Burns, his daughter Sarah Burns, and her husband David McMahon. It covers the arrests, interrogations, trials, convictions and vacating the convictions of the five men who were teenagers in 1989 at the time of the case. It was released in the US on November 23, 2012, April 16, 2013 as a television premiere on PBS.

Sarah Burns published related books on the case, under two different titles: The Central Park Five: A Chronicle of a City Wilding (2011) and The Central Park Five: The Untold Story Behind One of New York City's Most Infamous Crimes (2012).

== Content ==
The Central Park jogger case was the violent assault, rape, and sodomy of Trisha Meili, a female jogger, in New York City's Central Park, on April 19, 1989, as well as what were thought to be related attacks by a large group of youths on eight other persons in the park that night, including two that left victims unconscious. Meili was a 28-year-old investment banker at the time. She was so badly beaten that she was in a coma for 12 days. In July 1990, during the trial of the first three of the defendants, The New York Times described the attack on the female jogger as "one of the most widely publicized crimes of the 1980s."

The documentary provides background, interviews, expert analysis, and details of associated facts related to the case, prosecution and the conviction of the five suspects for the rape and also on charges related to assault of a male jogger. It documents the accounts of four of being coerced to confess to the rape; each withdrew such confessions before trial and always maintained his innocence.

The film also presents analysis to suggest that the police should have connected Matias Reyes to the case at the time that it happened. He was later found to have committed a rape in the park two days earlier. Convicted in 1990 as a serial rapist and murderer, Reyes confessed in 2001 to the crime against the female jogger to another inmate in prison and later to authorities. He said he had acted alone. A 2002 investigation by the DA's office found that DNA analysis identified him as the sole contributor of the semen found in and on the rape victim, and other evidence affirmed his confession and guilt. Based on the newly discovered evidence and its analysis of the prosecution, the DA's office recommended that the court vacate the convictions of the five men of all charges, which it did. The state withdrew all charges against the men.

In 2003, the Central Park Five, four of whom were younger than 16 and one of whom was 16 at the time of the crime, sued New York City for malicious prosecution, racial discrimination, and emotional distress. The city had resisted settling.

Ken Burns said he hoped release of the documentary would push the city to settle the case against it. The city settled the case for $41 million in 2014, after Bill de Blasio was elected as mayor.

== Background ==
Sarah Burns, the daughter of documentary filmmaker Ken Burns, worked for a summer as a paralegal in the office of one of the lawyers handling a lawsuit against the city on behalf of the five men who had been convicted in the case. She had written her undergraduate thesis on the topic of racism in the media coverage of the attack and related events, which inspired development of this documentary.

== Reception ==
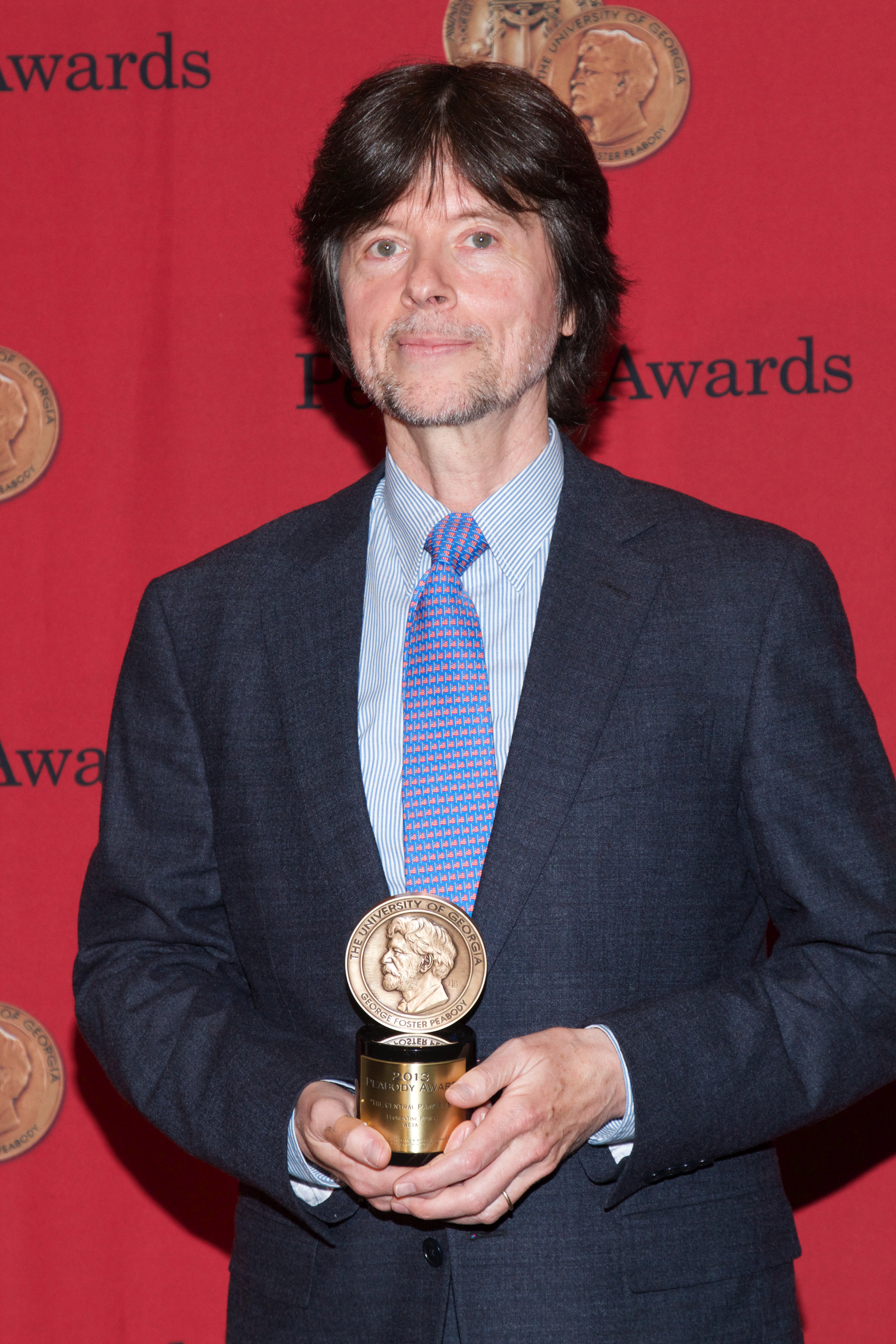
Ken Burns at the 73rd Annual Peabody Awards

Critic A. O. Scott of The New York Times said of the film, which he ranked as the fifth-best documentary of 2012: "A notorious crime—the rape of a jogger in Central Park in 1989—is revisited in this painful, angry, scrupulously reported story of race, injustice and media frenzy."

Critic Manohla Dargis of The New York Times suggested that the film could have explored more about the defendants. She wrote, referring to a Village Voice article published in April 1989: "residents ... identified several of the accused teenagers as belonging to a group of sometimes violent neighborhood troublemakers. ... Maybe the filmmakers thought that this history might muddy the waters and cast suspicion on the teenagers all over again. The problem is that by ignoring it—as well as gliding rather too fast over the gang attacks on the other people in Central Park on April 19—it seems as if there were something here that needs to be hidden."

Roger Ebert gave the film 3.5 out of 4 stars, saying "Our justice system presumes defendants are innocent until proven guilty. It also places extreme pressure on the police to make arrests leading to convictions—to 'solve' the crimes. The police officers knew, or should have known, that the confessions involved were extracted by psychological force."

The film received a Peabody Award in 2013 "for telling a harrowing, instructive story of fear, racism and mob mentality, and for exposing the media madness that fueled the investigation."

The film holds an approval rating of 92% on Rotten Tomatoes, based on 74 reviews and an average score of 7.97/10. On Metacritic, the film has a weighted average score of 79 out of 100, based on 20 critics, indicating "generally favorable reviews".

== Awards ==
Award	Category	Recipients and nominees	Result
Alliance of Women Film Journalists	Outstanding Achievement by a Woman in the Film Industry	Sarah Burns	Won
Black Film Critics Circle Awards	Best Documentary	Sarah Burns, Ken Burns, David McMahon	Won
Black Reel Awards	Outstanding Documentary	Sarah Burns, Ken Burns, David McMahon	Won
Broadcast Film Critics Association Awards	Critics Choice Award - Best Documentary Feature	Sarah Burns, Ken Burns, David McMahon	Nominated
Chicago Film Critics Association Awards	Best Documentary	Sarah Burns, Ken Burns, David McMahon	Nominated
Chicago International Film Festival	Audience Choice Award - Best Documentary Feature	Sarah Burns, Ken Burns, David McMahon	Won
Writers Guild of America Awards	Best Documentary Screenplay	Sarah Burns, Ken Burns, David McMahon	Nominated

== Representations in other media ==
Sarah Burns published a related book on the case, under two different titles: The Central Park Five: A Chronicle of a City Wilding (2011) and The Central Park Five: The Untold Story Behind One of New York City's Most Infamous Crimes (2012).
