= Botstein =

Botstein is a surname. Notable people with the surname include:

- David Botstein (1942–2026), American biologist
- Leon Botstein (born 1946), Swiss-American conductor, academic administrator, and scholar
- Sarah Botstein (born 1972), American documentary film producer
