= Hemingway (film) =

2021 documentary film

- Directed by: Ken Burns; Lynn Novick
- Narrated by: Peter Coyote
- Country of origin: United States
- No. of episodes: 3

Production
- Producers: Lynn Novick; Ken Burns
- Running time: 5 Hours, 42 minutes
- Production companies: Florentine Films; WETA

Original release
- Release: April 5 – April 7, 2021

Hemingway is a documentary film on the life of Ernest Hemingway produced by Ken Burns and Lynn Novick. It first aired on PBS in April 2021.

Burns documented both the public and private personae of Hemingway from his birth in 1899 to his death in 1961. It focuses on Hemingway's writing, his four marriages, three sons, and Hemingway's peacetime and wartime lifestyle and interests, his alcoholism and character flaws.

The film was narrated by Peter Coyote, with Jeff Daniels acting as the voice of Ernest Hemingway. Other voice actors include Meryl Streep, who voiced Hemingway's third wife, Martha Gellhorn.

Senator John McCain was interviewed for this documentary sometime before his death in 2018. He had often cited Robert Jordan, the protagonist of Hemingway's novel For Whom the Bell Tolls, as his hero.

== Episodes ==
1. "A Writer (1899–1929)"
2. "The Avatar (1929–1944)"
3. "The Blank Page (1944–1961)"

== Ken Burns and PBS ==
In 2007, Burns had made an agreement with PBS to produce work for the network well into the next decade. According to a 2017 piece in The New Yorker, Burns and his company, Florentine Films, selected topics for documentaries slated for release by 2030.

== Reception ==
Stephen Colbert of The Late Show with Stephen Colbert called it "incredibly moving and beautiful".
