= Ferdinand Ward =

American Ponzi scheme swindler and conman

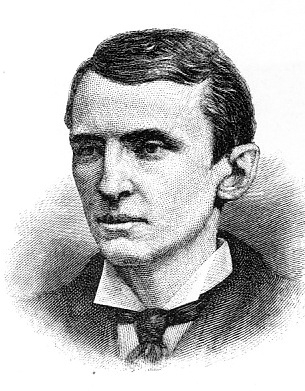
- Ward in an 1894 lithograph
- Born: Ferdinand De Wilton Ward Jr. 1851; Geneseo, New York, U.S.
- Died: 1925 (aged 74); New York City, U.S.
- Resting place: Green-Wood Cemetery, Brooklyn, New York, U.S.
- Other names: Young Napoleon of Finance the Best-Hated Man in the United States
- Occupation: Swindler
- Known for: Orchestrating a large-scale Ponzi Scheme
- Spouses: Ella Champion Ward (m. 1877; d. 1890) Isabella Ward (m. 1894)
- Children: 1
- Relatives: Geoffrey C. Ward (great-grandson); John H. Brinton (brother-in-law)

Ferdinand De Wilton Ward Jr. (1851–1925) was an American swindler. The collapse of his Ponzi scheme caused the Panic of 1884 and the bankruptcy of notables including Thomas Nast and Ulysses S. Grant, who had joined his son, Ulysses S. "Buck" Grant. Jr., as a partner in Ward's banking business.

== Background ==
Ward was born in 1851 in Geneseo, New York, to Jane Ward and Reverend Ferdinand De Wilton Ward, who had been missionaries in India. He was the youngest of their three surviving children. His older siblings were William Shaw Ward (1843–1917) and Sarah Ward Brinton (1837–1924).

In 1873, Ward moved to New York City, and was a clerk at the Produce Exchange. Soon after his move, he stole money from a Sunday School and laundered it through a bank, enriching himself. After marrying an heiress, Ella Champion Ward, née Green, in 1877, he was able to use her family's wealth for his advantage.

== Ponzi scheme ==
In 1880 he established his own banking and brokerage firm. One of the first investments in his firm came from James Dean Fish, president of the Marine National Bank, who continued colluding in Ward's swindle until its collapse. Ward also came into contact with Ulysses S. "Buck" Grant. Jr., the son of former president Ulysses S. Grant, as his brother was a roommate of Grant Jr. at Columbia University. Eventually, Ward gained the trust and investments of Grant, Jr., whose name he attached to his own firm, now called Grant & Ward. Ward ran the company as a Ponzi scheme, claiming that he had inside access to government contracts, a claim which gained further credence when the former president later joined the firm as a full partner after investing $100,000 into the firm. Ward used the same securities over and over again as collateral against loans and paid off older investors with money raised from newer ones, along with paying investors high interest on investments. Some investors, such as the Grants, kept most of their funds in the firm, receiving 2-3% profits per month.

While his fraud remained undetected, Ward found great success, gaining $9 million, a brownstone in New York, and a palatial 25-acre estate in Connecticut. The Grants also gained wealth through the elaborate scheme, which gave Ward the nickname "The Young Napoleon of Wall Street".

However, the scheme eventually collapsed on May 4, 1884, bankrupting the Grants, The Marine National Bank, Thomas Nast, and many other investors, and setting off the Panic of 1884. Despite the elder Grant taking out a $150,000 personal loan from his friend William H. Vanderbilt, the collapse was irreversible, and the securities lost. Ward himself fled.

Ward was later brought before the New York Supreme Court, found guilty of fraud, and sentenced to ten years in prison. During his trial, Ward showed no remorse for his actions, explaining that he had to "rob Peter to pay Paul".

== Later years ==
During his time in prison at Sing Sing, Ward lived fairly comfortably through his connections, and was released after serving only six years. While he was imprisoned, his wife, Ella, willed her entire estate to the support, education, and maintenance of her son Clarence until he turned 25. Ella died in 1890, and the inheritance moved to Clarence, who moved in with Ella's family. This move deprived Ward of much of his wealth.

After his release, Ward attempted to gain back his wealth to no avail, pursuing legal avenues but also orchestrating a failed attempt to kidnap Clarence. In 1894, Ward married Isabella Ward, née Storer, and soon afterwards faded into relative obscurity, although he occasionally commented on the collapse of Grant & Ward and Ulysses S. Grant. He died in 1925 at the age of 74, and his wife died one year later.

Ward's grandson, F. Champion Ward, was a vice president at the Ford Foundation, and his great-grandson, Geoffrey C. Ward, is an author who wrote the book A Disposition to Be Rich about his great-grandfather in 2013.
