= The Congress (1989 film) =

- Directed by: Ken Burns
- Written by: David McCullough; Bernard Weisberger; Ric Burns; Geoffrey C. Ward
- Produced by: Ken Burns; Stephen Ives
- Narrated by: David McCullough
- Edited by: Sally Jo Menke
- Release date: March 20, 1989
- Running time: 90 min.
- Country: United States
- Language: English

The Congress is a 1989 documentary film directed by the Emmy Award-winning director Ken Burns. The Florentine Films production, which focuses on the United States Congress, aired on PBS on March 20, 1989.

== Summary ==
Narrated by David McCullough, the documentary features use of photographs, paintings, and film from sessions of Congress, in its implementation of the Ken Burns Effect. Scenes from the Academy Award-winning Frank Capra film Mr. Smith Goes to Washington are also used. The work features numerous interviews from writers and historians including Charles McDowell, David McCullough, Cokie Roberts, George Tames, David Broder, James MacGregor Burns, Barbara Fields, and Alistair Cooke. Many congressmen are specifically referred to, including Henry Clay, Daniel Webster, John C. Calhoun, Jefferson Davis, Thomas Brackett Reed, Joseph Gurney Cannon, George William Norris, Jeannette Rankin, and Everett Dirksen.

The film also includes focus on the Congress's work during pivotal periods in United States history, including the Civil War, Civil Rights Movement, and women's suffrage. The documentary was released on DVD on September 28, 2004. Footage of the Capitol from the film was later incorporated into Burns' 1990 documentary The Civil War.
