= Muhammad Ali (miniseries) =

- Genre: Documentary
- Created by: Ken Burns
- Written by: Sarah Burns; David McMahon
- Directed by: Ken Burns; Sarah Burns; David McMahon
- Narrated by: Keith David
- Composer: Jahlil Beats
- Country of origin: United States
- No. of episodes: 4

Production
- Executive producer: Ken Burns
- Producers: Sarah Burns; David McMahon; Stephanie Jenkins; Ken Burns
- Cinematography: Buddy Squires
- Editors: K.A. Miille; Woody Richman; Ted Raviv; Aljernon Tunsil
- Running time: 7 Hours 53 minutes
- Production companies: Florentine Films; WETA-TV

Original release
- Network: PBS
- Release: September 19 – September 22, 2021

Muhammad Ali is a 2021 four-part documentary miniseries about Muhammad Ali. The series was directed by Ken Burns, Sarah Burns, and David McMahon.

The documentary had its premiere at the 48th Telluride Film Festival on September 2, 2021. It later premiered on PBS on September 19, 2021.

== Episodes ==
No.	Title	Original release date	US viewers (millions)
1	"Round One: The Greatest (1942–1964)"	September 19, 2021	N/A
2	"Round Two: What's My Name? (1964–1970)"	September 20, 2021	N/A
3	"Round Three: The Rivalry (1970–1974)"	September 21, 2021	N/A
4	"Round Four: The Spell Remains (1974–2016)"	September 22, 2021	N/A

== Reception ==
On review aggregator website Rotten Tomatoes, the series has an approval rating of 100% based on 14 reviews, with an average rating of 8/10. According to Metacritic, which assigned a weighted average score of 88 out of 100 based on 9 critics, it received "universal acclaim".

Jeremy Schapp of ESPN called, "It is a stupendous achievement."

Finn Cohen of The New York Times called it, "A sweeping achievement."

Peter Keough of The Boston Globe called it, "Exhilarating."

Adam Buckman of MediaPost wrote, "The most satisfying, riveting and moving TV experience of the year."
