= Keith David =

American actor (born 1956)

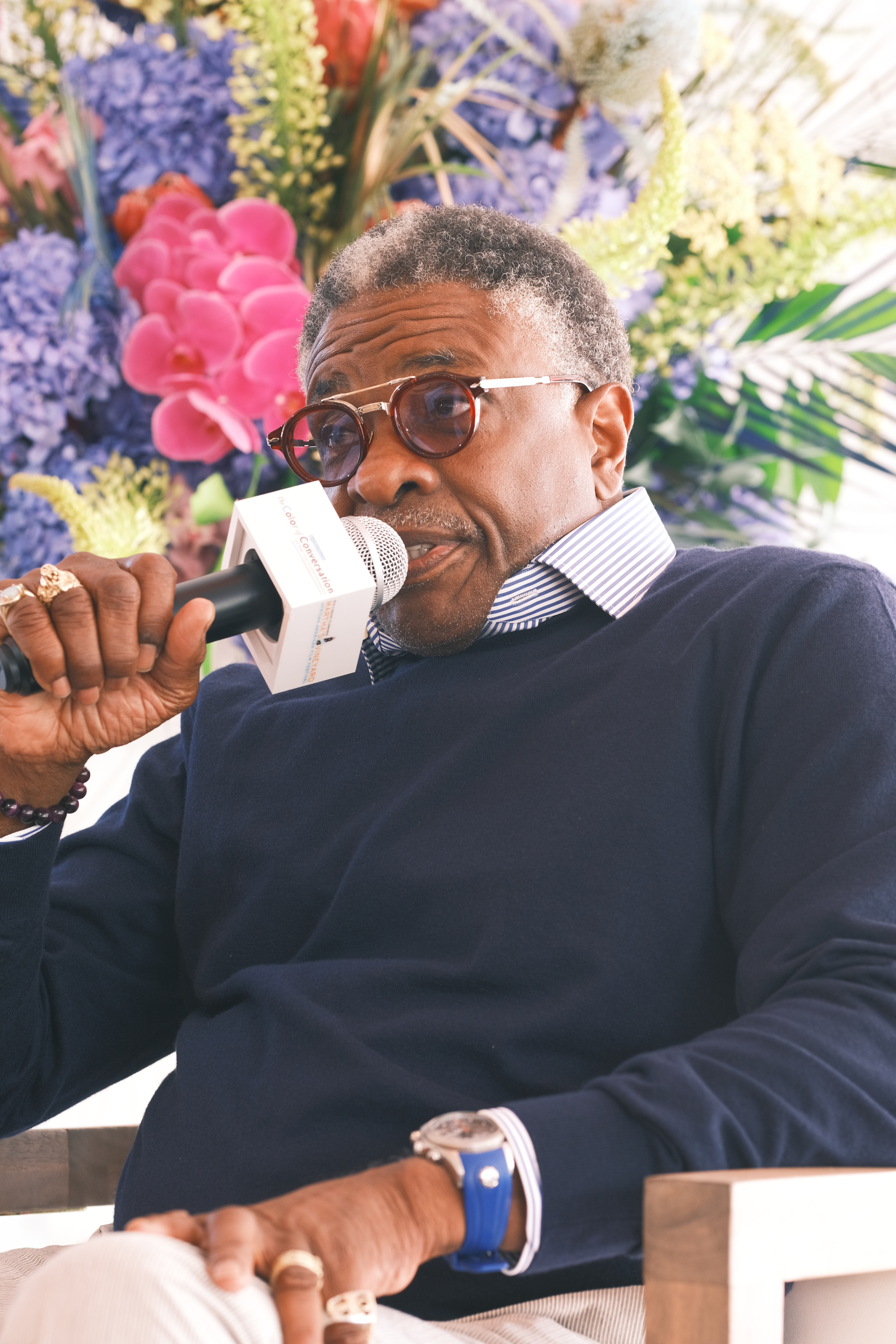
- David in 2025
- Born: Keith David Williams; June 4, 1956 (age 70); Manhattan, New York City, U.S.
- Education: Juilliard School (BFA)
- Occupation: Actor
- Years active: 1977–present
- Spouses: Margit Edwards (m. 1990; div. 1999) Dionne Lea Williams (m. 2001)
- Children: 3

Keith David Williams (born June 4, 1956) is an American actor. He is mostly known for his distinctive, deep bass voice, distinctive face and screen presence in over 400 roles across film, stage, television, voice work and interactive media.

He has starred in such films as The Thing (1982), Platoon (1986), They Live (1988), Dead Presidents (1995), Armageddon (1998), There's Something About Mary (1998), Requiem for a Dream (2000), Pitch Black (2000), Barbershop (2002), Crash (2004), The Chronicles of Riddick (2004), Cloud Atlas (2012), The Nice Guys (2016), Nope (2022), and American Fiction (2023). He starred as Elroy Patashnik in the sixth season of the NBC series Community (2015) and as Bishop James Greenleaf in the Oprah Winfrey Network drama Greenleaf (2016–20).

His voice acting career includes the narrator of the Ken Burns films The War (2007) and Unforgivable Blackness: The Rise and Fall of Jack Johnson, for which he won the Emmy Award for Outstanding Voice-Over Performance. In film, he has voiced Dr. Facilier in The Princess and the Frog and the Cat in Coraline (both 2009). On television, he voiced Goliath in Gargoyles (1994–97), Al Simmons / Spawn in Todd McFarlane's Spawn (1997–99), The Flame King in Adventure Time (2012–17), President Andre Curtis in Rick and Morty (2015–present) and its spin-off President Curtis (2026–present), King Andrias in Amphibia (2020–22), Dr. Tenma in Pluto (2023), and Husk in Hazbin Hotel (2024–present). Video game roles include the Arbiter Thel 'Vadamee in the Halo franchise (2004–15), Julius Little and himself in the Saints Row series (2006–13), Captain Anderson in the Mass Effect series (2007–13), Chaos in Dissidia Final Fantasy (2008), Sergeant Foley in Call of Duty: Modern Warfare 2 (2009), and Commander Zavala in Destiny 2: The Final Shape (2024).

On June 4, 2026, David received a star on the Hollywood Walk of Fame.

== Early life and education ==
David was born June 4, 1956, in Harlem Upper Manhattan, and raised in Corona, Queens. His mother, Dolores (née Dickenson), was a manager at New York Telephone, and his father, Lester Williams, worked as a director of payroll operations.

He initially intended to become an actor after playing the Cowardly Lion in a school production of The Wizard of Oz and went on to study at Manhattan's High School of Performing Arts. There, David also sang in a city-wide all boys' choir. He attended the Juilliard School's Drama Division (1975–1979, Group 8) where he graduated with a Bachelor of Fine Arts degree in 1979.

== Career ==
=== Film and television ===
In 1980–81, David toured the country with John Houseman's The Acting Company in productions of A Midsummer Night's Dream and Samuel Beckett's Waiting for Godot. Less than two years later, he went on to star as Childs, opposite Kurt Russell in John Carpenter's The Thing, starting his lengthy on-screen career. In the 1980s run of Mister Rogers' Neighborhood, he portrayed Keith the Southwood Carpenter in the Neighborhood of Make-Believe segments. He also played Keith, the game coin collector in an episode where Rogers and a small child learn to play the arcade game Donkey Kong.

He went on to appear in films such as Platoon (1986), Stars and Bars (1988), They Live (1988), Men at Work (1990), and Marked for Death (1990). He played Kirby in the 1995 film Dead Presidents, and he appeared in the 1995 Spike Lee film Clockers. Roles in other films followed, in Volcano (1997), Armageddon (1998), There's Something About Mary (1998), Pitch Black (2000), Barbershop (2002), Agent Cody Banks (2003), Head of State (2003), Hollywood Homicide (2003), Agent Cody Banks 2: Destination London (2004), The Chronicles of Riddick (2004), Crash (2004), ATL (2006), Delta Farce (2007) First Sunday (2008), The Nice Guys (2016), Nope (2022), and American Fiction (2023).

He portrayed "Father" in the romantic comedy action film Mr. & Mrs. Smith (2005). At the same time, he has appeared in independent films including Requiem for a Dream (2000), playing the role of Big Tim. He has also appeared extensively in television productions since the 1980s and as a regular character Lieutenant Williams on the short-lived television series The Job. He was a regular on another shoot, The Big House, made for ABC in 2004. David portrayed Detective Jim Crenshaw in the 2010 horror film Chain Letter.

In 2010, David was cast as Max Malini for the NBC television series The Cape. On April 18, 2011, Keith appeared in the 21st episode of season one of Hawaii Five-0 as criminal tycoon Jimmy Cannon. In 2012, he appeared in the horror film Smiley and the science-fiction drama Cloud Atlas. In 2013, David appeared in the controversial drama Boiling Pot which is based on true events of racism. In 2014, David portrayed Command Sergeant Major Donald Cody in the Fox comedy series Enlisted. Later in 2014, David was cast as Elroy Patashnik in the sixth season of the sitcom Community.

In 2015, David was cast in the leading role alongside Lynn Whitfield in the Oprah Winfrey Network drama series Greenleaf.

David has appeared in several genre films, but science fiction is one of his favorites. In an interview with Starlog, he said, “I like the philosophy of science fiction...You start out with a premise and then you take these wonderful, imaginative quantum leaps into different realms, into different realities, and you must fashion a philosophical foundation for the world you create". To prepare for certain roles he will often watch videotapes, read books, and listen to music that moves him. In an interview with Maxim, he said "I do a Nat King Cole act. Nat is my inspiration, and a big influence in my life. And I'm going to keep working on it. Nat practiced singing for two hours every day, so even he didn't get that level of smooth without working on his voice."

=== Voice acting ===
David also works extensively as a voice actor. He was the voice of the Flame King in Adventure Time, King Andrias from Amphibia, Goliath from Gargoyles, the title character in the Spawn animated series, and Lemuel Kane in Archer. In the English dub of Princess Mononoke, David played the narrator and Okkoto. He played the role of Mama in the English dub of 3×3 Eyes. He provided the voice for the character Decker in the role-playing video game Fallout and the voice for the character Vhailor in Planescape: Torment. He provided the voice of the Arbiter for the video game Halo 2, released in 2004; later, he reprised that role in the Xbox 360 follow-up Halo 3. He voiced the character again in Halo: The Master Chief Collection and also in Halo 5: Guardians, released in 2014 and 2015 respectively. He played the role of Captain David Anderson in BioWare's Mass Effect trilogy.

David did voice work in the video game Saints Row and its sequel Saints Row II, playing gang leader of the 3rd Street Saints Julius Little, as well as voicing himself in Saints Row IV. He is also heard on the intro of several Ice Cube projects, including Westside Connection's 2003 release Terrorist Threats, Cube's 2008 solo album Raw Footage, Cube's 2010 solo album I Am the West, and he narrated the documentary Beef II, which also featured Ice Cube.

He provides the voice for the UPS "What Can Brown Do for You" commercials. He did the voice of Despero in the two part episode "Hearts and Minds" of Justice League. He has done voice work for early Adult Swim commercials for Inuyasha.

He has worked with documentary filmmaker Ken Burns, narrating Burns's Jazz, Mark Twain, The War, Unforgivable Blackness: The Rise and Fall of Jack Johnson, Jackie Robinson, Muhammad Ali, and Leonardo da Vinci. David won the Emmy Award for Outstanding Voice-Over Performance for his work in The War and Unforgivable Blackness. He performs the narration duties in the BBC documentary, World War II: Behind Closed Doors.

The 2004 PBS documentary Ancient Refuge in the Holy Land and the 2005 History Channel documentary Crusades: Crescent & the Cross focusing on the medieval Crusades were both narrated by him, as well as the 2003 National Geographic documentary Inside Mecca. He later parodied his documentary work by narrating the 2012 episode of Community, "Pillows and Blankets", a mockumentary revolving around a pillow fight between rival blanket forts.

David has done voice acting work for other documentaries including several for National Geographic and the documentary Comic Book Superheroes Unmasked for the History Channel. He replaced Paul Winfield as narrator for the A&E show City Confidential, taking over after Winfield's death in 2004. He voiced the trailer for the film Primeval, which was released in the United States on January 12, 2007.

David voiced the police detective Alex Cross for the audiobook versions of three novels by James Patterson: Cat and Mouse (1997), Pop Goes the Weasel (1999), and Roses are Red (2000). Other voice roles include Bebe Proud Clone from The Proud Family Movie, Atlas from Teen Titans, the lone renegade male gorilla Tublat in The Legend of Tarzan, and the Decepticon Barricade in Transformers: The Game.

He voiced Apollo the Sun God in Hercules (1997), Council Member in Final Fantasy: The Spirits Within (2001), Chaos in Dissidia Final Fantasy (2008), the Black Cat in Coraline (2009), Sergeant Foley in Call of Duty: Modern Warfare 2 (2009), Dr. Facilier in The Princess and the Frog (2009), and Big Man in The Spectacular Spider-Man episode "Survival of the Fittest".

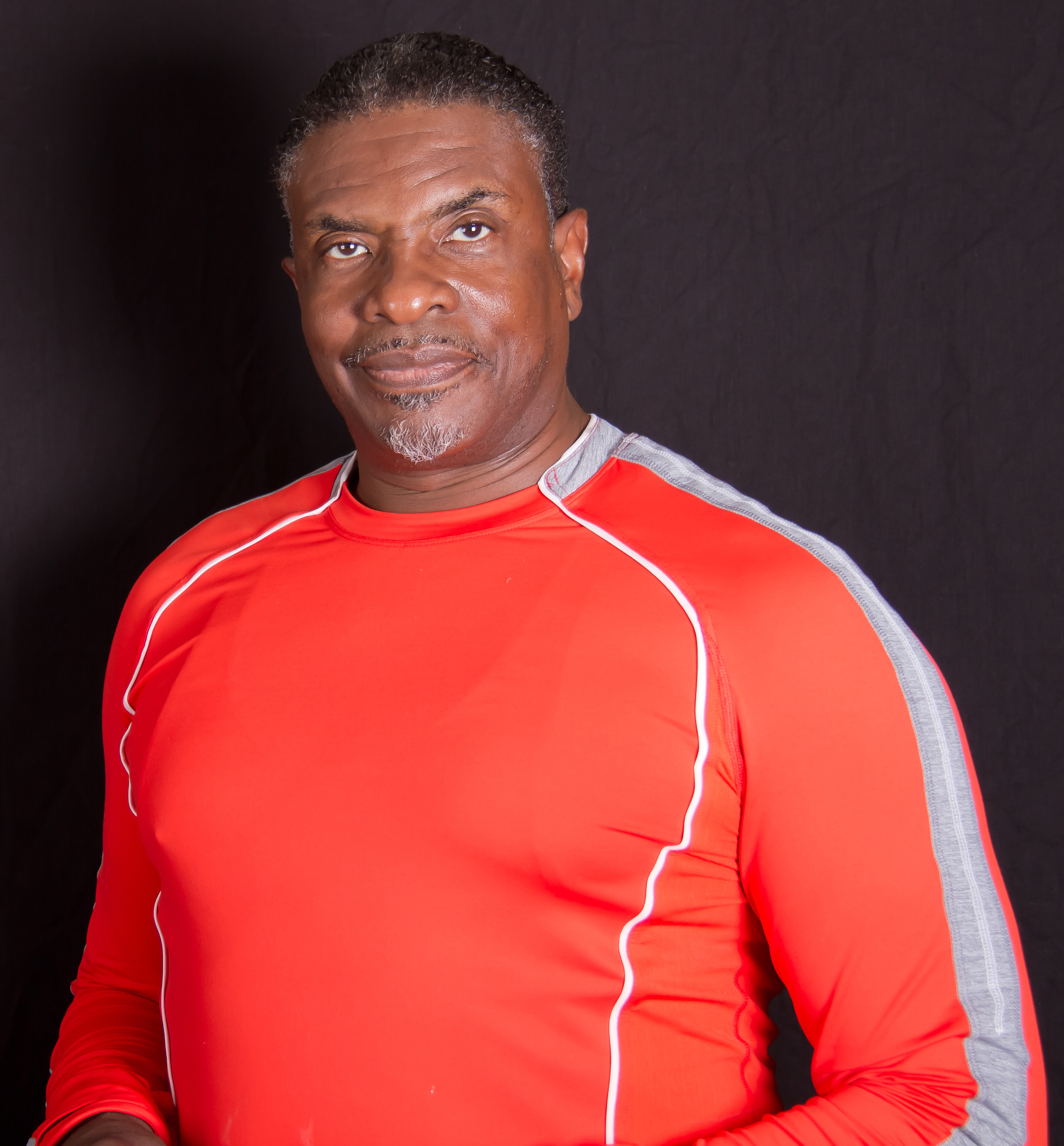
David in 2010

On May 25, 2008, he narrated Kansas City's Celebration at the Station, a Memorial Day service held annually at the World War I Memorial. During the ceremony, he announced the attendance of Frank W. Buckles, the last living veteran of World War I. He was the voice of Frederick Douglass in the third episode of the PBS documentary God in America: How Religious Liberty Shaped America in 2010.

David returned to the Saints Row series in Saints Row IV, voicing a fictionalized version of himself as well as reprising Julius Little. He is the narrator of the History Channel series The Bible which premiered on March 3, 2013.

David voiced the superhero gorilla Solovar in the two-part Gorilla City episode of The Flash. Keith David also has a recurring role as the President of the United States in the adult animated series Rick and Morty, a role that has been spun off as the lead character in its own President Curtis (2026) series.

David was the narrator of the MLB Network special Mr. Padre, the video biography of San Diego Padres Hall-of-Fame outfielder Tony Gwynn.

David has also narrated several WWE documentaries including The True Story of Wrestlemania and the 20 episodes of The Monday Night War, documenting the battle between WWE Raw and WCW Nitro.

David later recurred in Stargirl as the voice of Mister Bones.

David began voicing Commander Zavala in the Destiny franchise beginning in Destiny 2: The Final Shape, replacing Lance Reddick following his death in 2023.

David also voiced the character Brian Robertson in the revival series of King of the Hill.

In 2026, David starred in an audio drama retelling of Robert Louis Stevenson’s Treasure Island. The eight-hour production, written and directed by Orson Ossman, is titled "Treasure Island: A Telling for the New World."

In 2026, David also narrated the documentary Crime and Punishment in America, directed by Lynn Novick and produced by Ken Burns, which was released on PBS in November, 2026.

=== Stage ===
In the 1980s, David worked with La MaMa Experimental Theatre Club and toured Italy and Greece with productions of Jerusulem and Mythos Oedipus.

In 1992, David received a Tony Award nomination for Best Supporting Actor in a Musical for his performance in Jelly's Last Jam. David received raves for his Shakespeare work on stage in Central Park, New York City. In 1995, he played the lead as Floyd "Schoolboy" Barton in August Wilson's Seven Guitars on Broadway. In 1995, David acted alongside Whitney Houston, Cedric the Entertainer, and Samuel E. Wright in the 1995 Apollo revival of The Wiz. In May 2006, he appeared in the musical Hot Feet on Broadway in New York. David appeared in the 2013 revival of August Wilson's Joe Turner's Come and Gone at the Mark Taper Theater in Los Angeles. Directed by Phylicia Rashad, he played the part of innkeeper Seth Holly.

His performance in Ebony Repertory Theatre's 2014 Paul Robeson by Phillip Hayes Dean was scheduled for March 12, 2014, but was postponed due to a knee injury and opened on Friday, March 21, 2014.

From April 21, 2015, to May 10, 2015, Keith David starred as Dolomite in the off-Broadway play ToasT. The play (produced by Lemon Andersen and co-starred Hill Harper) was set in the Attica Prison around the time of its 1971 prison riot and told of the lives of its prisoners, using poetic prose.

== Personal life ==
David has been married twice and has a son from his first marriage and two daughters from his second marriage.

When asked in an interview on his narration work of The Bible if he was a religious man, he said: "I'm not a religious man. I'm a man of spirit. Religion can get political. I believe in God and spirit. I believe in church. I've been baptized. I've gone to Catholic, Baptist, Episcopal and Church of God in Christ." In the same interview, he credited his success to God's grace and said his favorite scripture is Psalm 116.

During a live Twitter Q&A in 2017, David listed Dr. Facilier, Spawn, and Goliath as his three favorite voice roles.

In April 2023, David endorsed author Marianne Williamson in the 2024 Democratic presidential primaries.

== See also ==
- List of people from Harlem
