= The Shakers: Hands to Work, Hearts to God =

1984 documentary film

The Shakers: Hands to Work, Hearts to God is a 1984 documentary film by Ken Burns.

== Summary ==
Narrated by David McCullough, this hour-long documentary features interviews with several living Shakers and with historians and philosophers.

== Inspiration ==
Ken Burns has said that he chose the topic of the Shakers in large part because his first project, the Oscar-nominated Brooklyn Bridge, was devoted to urban American history; Shakerism offered him an opportunity to explore rural American history.

== Availability ==
It was released part of Ken Burns' America DVD set on September 28, 2004.
