= Thomas Jefferson (film) =

- DVD cover
- Written by: Geoffrey C. Ward
- Directed by: Ken Burns
- Narrated by: Ossie Davis
- Country of origin: United States
- Original language: English

Production
- Producers: Ken Burns; Camilla Rockwell
- Cinematography: Ken Burns; Peter B. Hutton; Allen Moore; Buddy Squires
- Editors: Paul Barnes; Kevin Kertscher
- Running time: 180 minutes
- Production company: Florentine Films

Original release
- Network: PBS
- Release: February 18 – February 19, 1997

Thomas Jefferson is a 1997, two-part American documentary film directed and produced by Ken Burns. It covers the life and times of Thomas Jefferson, the 3rd President of the United States.

In the film, Jefferson is portrayed as a renaissance man. Not only was he a dedicated public servant but was also a writer, an inventor and a noted architect. Burns captures both the public and private lives of Jefferson.

== Actors and historians ==
Many noted actors read lines of various historical figures. A series of American university professors of history and political figures discussed background information.

Actors included:

- Ossie Davis – Narrator
- Sam Waterston – Thomas Jefferson
- Blythe Danner – Martha Jefferson
- Gwyneth Paltrow – Jefferson's granddaughter
- Philip Bosco as Sam Adams

Historians and political commentators included: Daniel Boorstin, Andrew Burstein, Joseph Ellis, Clay S. Jenkinson, Gore Vidal, George Will, Garry Wills, John Hope Franklin, James Oliver Horton and Julian Bond.

A topic of Jefferson's private life was the long-rumored liaison between Jefferson and his mixed-race slave Sally Hemings. She was a half-sister to his late wife and the daughter of John Wayles and his slave Betty Hemings; Sally was three-quarters white. The white historians gave all the reasons they believed Jefferson would not have done it. Black historians discussed "reality and inevitability." Noted historian John Hope Franklin referred to all the mulattos of the period and said, "These things [interracial liaisons] were part of the natural landscape in Virginia, and Mr. Jefferson was as likely as any others to have done this because it's in character with the times—and indeed, with him, who believed in exploiting these people that he controlled completely."

Following airing of this film, in 1998 a Y-DNA study showed a match between a descendant of Sally's youngest son, Eston Hemings and a descendant of the male Jefferson line. Following a review of other historic evidence, this has led to a consensus among historians, including the Thomas Jefferson Foundation of Monticello, that Jefferson did have a long-term relationship with Hemings and fathered her children. Ellis and Burstein were among those who commented publicly about their change in thinking.

== See also ==
- List of television series and miniseries about the American Revolution
- List of films about the American Revolution
