= Lilly Burns =

American television producer

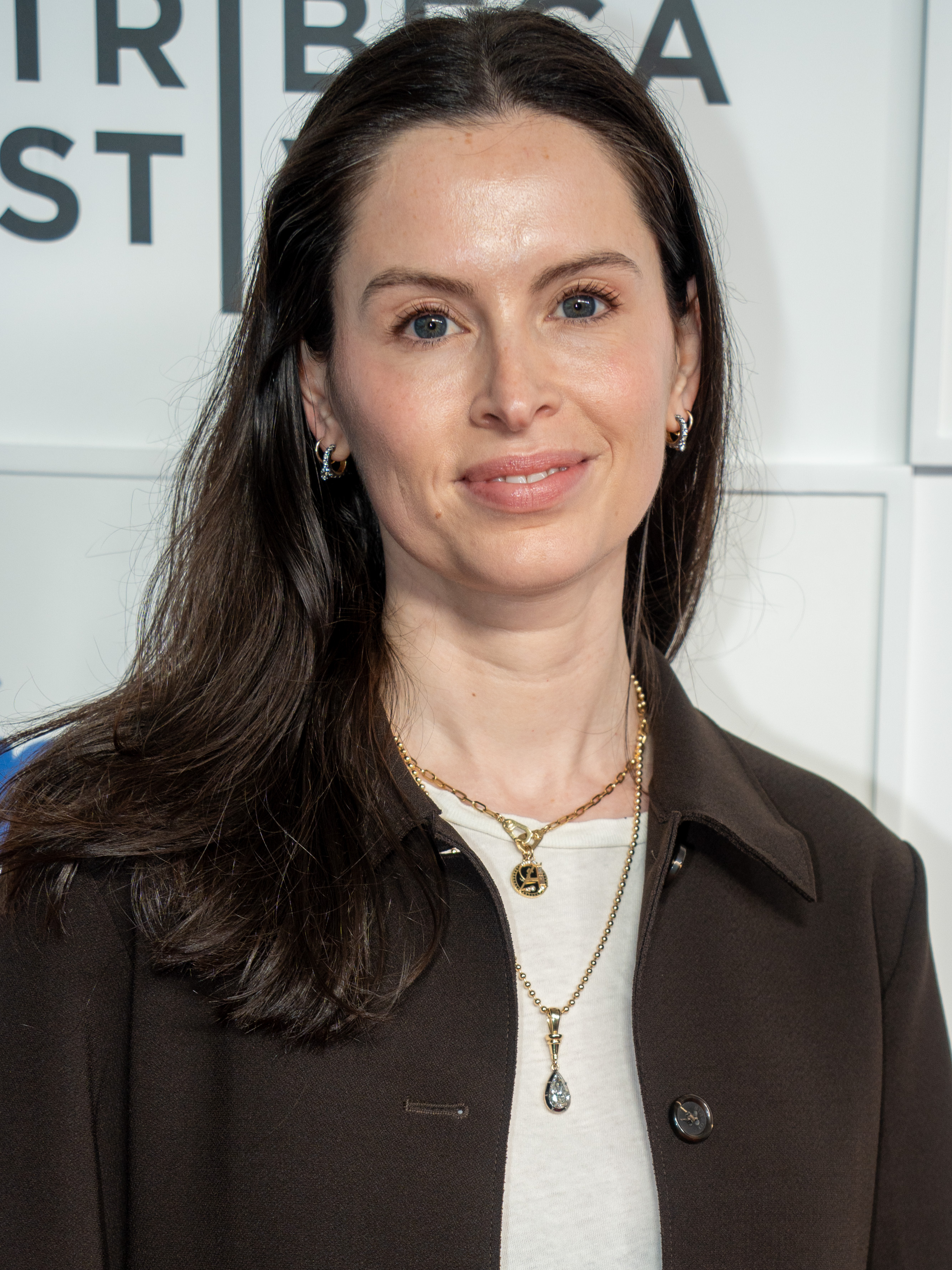
- Burns during the 2025 Tribeca Festival
- Education: Columbia University (BA)
- Occupations: television producer, executive
- Years active: 2010 – present
- Spouse: Tony Hernandez (m. 2015)
- Children: 2
- Father: Ken Burns
- Relatives: Ric Burns (uncle); Sarah Burns (sister)
- Awards: The Peabody Awards (2014)

Lilly Burns is an American television producer who co-founded Jax Media. In January 2022, she was named president of Imagine Entertainment.

== Early life and education ==
Burns's father is the documentary filmmaker Ken Burns. Her uncle, Ric Burns, and sister, Sarah Burns, are also documentary filmmakers. She graduated from Columbia University in 2009.

== Career ==
She co-founded Jax Media with Tony Hernandez and John Skidmore in 2011. She won a Peabody Award in 2014 for producing Inside Amy Schumer.

As executive producer, she was nominated for six Emmy Awards for her work on Hack Into Broad City (2014), A Very Murray Christmas (2015), Russian Doll (2019), and Emily in Paris (2020). She was also nominated for two Gotham Awards for her work on Search Party and Russian Doll.

== Personal life ==
She married Tony Hernandez in 2015. The couple and their two children live in Boerum Hill.

== Filmography ==
Year	Title	Notes
2015	A Very Murray Christmas	producer
2017	The Rundown with Robin Thede	executive producer
2018	Roseanne	executive producer
2018-2025	The Conners	executive producer
2019	Russian Doll	executive producer
2016–2019	Broad City	executive producer; director, one episode
2019	Living with Yourself	producer
2019	Florida Girls	executive producer
2019	First Wives Club	executive producer
2019	Nikki Fre$h	executive producer
2020	Search Party	executive producer; director, one episode
2021	My Next Guest Needs No Introduction with David Letterman	executive producer
2015–2021	Younger	producer
2019–2021	Desus & Mero	executive producer
2020–present	Emily in Paris	executive producer
2022	The Pentaverate	executive producer
2022	Uncoupled	executive producer
