= Huey Long (film) =

- Directed by: Ken Burns
- Written by: Geoffrey C. Ward
- Produced by: Ken Burns; Richard Kilberg
- Narrated by: David McCullough
- Release date: October 15, 1986
- Running time: 88 minutes
- Country: United States
- Language: English

Huey Long is an American documentary film on the life and career of the politician Huey Long. It was directed by Ken Burns, and produced by Ken Burns and Richard Kilberg in 1985. The film first aired on October 15, 1986. The film includes interviews with Russell B. Long, author Robert Penn Warren, and political contemporary and opponent Cecil Morgan. It was narrated by the historian David McCullough.
