= The Statue of Liberty (film) =

- Directed by: Ken Burns
- Written by: Geoffrey C. Ward; Bernard Weisberger
- Produced by: Ken Burns; Buddy Squires
- Narrated by: David McCullough
- Edited by: Buddy Squires
- Distributed by: PBS
- Release date: October 28, 1985
- Running time: 60 minutes
- Country: United States
- Language: English

The Statue of Liberty is a 1985 American documentary film on the history of the Statue of Liberty (Liberty Enlightening the World). It was produced and directed by Ken Burns. The film, which first aired in October 1985, was narrated by historian David McCullough.

== Contributors ==
The film includes readings by Jeremy Irons and Arthur Miller, among others. McCullough, then-New York Gov. Mario Cuomo, former congresswoman Barbara Jordan, director Miloš Forman, writers James Baldwin and Jerzy Kosiński, historian Vartan Gregorian, musician Ray Charles, and poet Carolyn Forché are among those interviewed.

Paul Simon's 1973 song "American Tune" is heard at the beginning and end of the film. Also included are vintage clips dealing with the Statue of Liberty from the films The Immigrant (1917), Mr. Smith Goes to Washington (1939), Anything Can Happen (1952), and Planet of the Apes (1968).

== Accolades ==
The film was nominated for an Academy Award for Best Documentary Feature.
