= Bernard Weisberger =

American historian (1922–2024)

- Born: Bernard Allen Weisberger; August 15, 1922; New York, U.S.
- Died: April 9, 2024 (aged 101)
- Education: Columbia University (BA); University of Chicago (PhD)
- Occupations: Writer; Historian

Bernard Allen Weisberger (August 15, 1922 – April 9, 2024) was an American historian. Weisberger taught American history at several universities including the University of Chicago, Wayne State University, and the University of Rochester, where he was chair of the department. He has written more than a dozen books and worked on documentaries with Bill Moyers and Ken Burns. His article "The Dark and Bloody Ground of Reconstruction Historiography," which received the Charles Ramsdell Prize is considered a standard in the study of the Reconstruction period.

Weisberger was a contributing editor of American Heritage, where he was a columnist for ten years. He published 120 articles in the magazine, with his first appearing in 1955.

Weisberger was also a member of the National Hillel Commission and a participant in the civil rights movement.

In 1942, he graduated from Columbia University and joined the Signal Intelligence Service, which later became the National Security Agency. He studied the Japanese language in a crash course at Columbia, and then served in the Pacific translating intercepted Japanese radio messages that had been decoded by cryptanalysts, but still needed translation. After the war, he received his PhD from University of Chicago.

Weisberger turned 100 in August 2022. He died on April 9, 2024, at the age of 101.

== Selected books ==
His books include:

- The La Follettes of Wisconsin: Love and Politics in Progressive America (University of Wisconsin Press, 1994)
- America Afire: Adams, Jefferson, and the Revolutionary Election of 1800 (Morrow, 2000)
- When Chicago Ruled Baseball: The Cubs-White Sox World series of 1906 (Harper Collins, 2006).
