= Empire of the Air: The Men Who Made Radio =

1992 film by Ken Burns

- Author: Tom Lewis
- Language: English
- Subject: Radio
- Published: September 1, 1991
- Publisher: HarperCollins
- Publication place: United States
- Media type: Print
- Pages: 421
- ISBN: 978-0-060-18215-1 (Hardcover)

Empire of the Air: The Men Who Made Radio
- DVD release cover
- Based on: Empire of the Air: The Men Who Made Radio by Tom Lewis
- Screenplay by: Geoffrey Ward
- Directed by: Ken Burns
- Narrated by: Jason Robards
- Country of origin: United States
- Original language: English

Production
- Producers: Ken Burns, Morgan Wesson, Tom Lewis
- Editor: Paul Barnes
- Running time: 100 minutes
- Production companies: Florentine Films, WETA-TV

Original release
- Network: PBS
- Release: January 29, 1992

Empire of the Air: The Men Who Made Radio is a non-fiction book by Tom Lewis, which traces the early development of radio broadcasting in the United States, published by HarperCollins in 1991. The book was adapted into both a 1992 documentary film by Ken Burns and a 1992 radio drama written and directed by David Ossman. The source of the title is from a quote by Lee de Forest.

== Documentary ==
Ken Burns' documentary first aired on PBS on January 29, 1992, narrated by actor Jason Robards. The film focused primarily on the three pioneers of radio in America: Lee de Forest, Edwin Howard Armstrong, and David Sarnoff. The program interspersed audio and musical highlights of "old time" radio with the stories, achievements, failures, scams and bitter feuds between each of the main protagonists. Among the interviewees featured are radio and television historian Erik Barnouw, dramatist Norman Corwin, and sportscaster Red Barber.

== Drama ==
Broadcast on public radio, the Ossman radio drama originated in 1992 from Washington's WETA. The cast included Steve Allen as narrator, John Randolph as de Forest, David Ogden Stiers as Armstrong, and Harris Yulin as Sarnoff.

== See also ==
- List of old-time radio programs
- Amateur radio
- FM radio
