= Thomas Hart Benton (film) =

1988 film directed by Ken Burns

- Written by: Geoffrey C. Ward
- Directed by: Ken Burns
- Narrated by: Jason Robards
- Country of origin: United States
- Original language: English

Production
- Producers: Ken Burns; Julie Dunfey
- Editor: Donna Marino
- Running time: 85 minutes

Original release
- Release: November 1, 1988

Thomas Hart Benton is a 1988 documentary film about painter Thomas Hart Benton by Ken Burns.

== Summary ==
His paintings are celebrated in this story of an American artist who depicted a reliant country in the Great Depression.

== Availability ==
Released on DVD individually on November 12, 2002 by Warner Home Video. Released as part of Ken Burns America DVD set on September 28, 2004.
