= Sarah Burns (writer) =

American author, public speaker and filmmaker

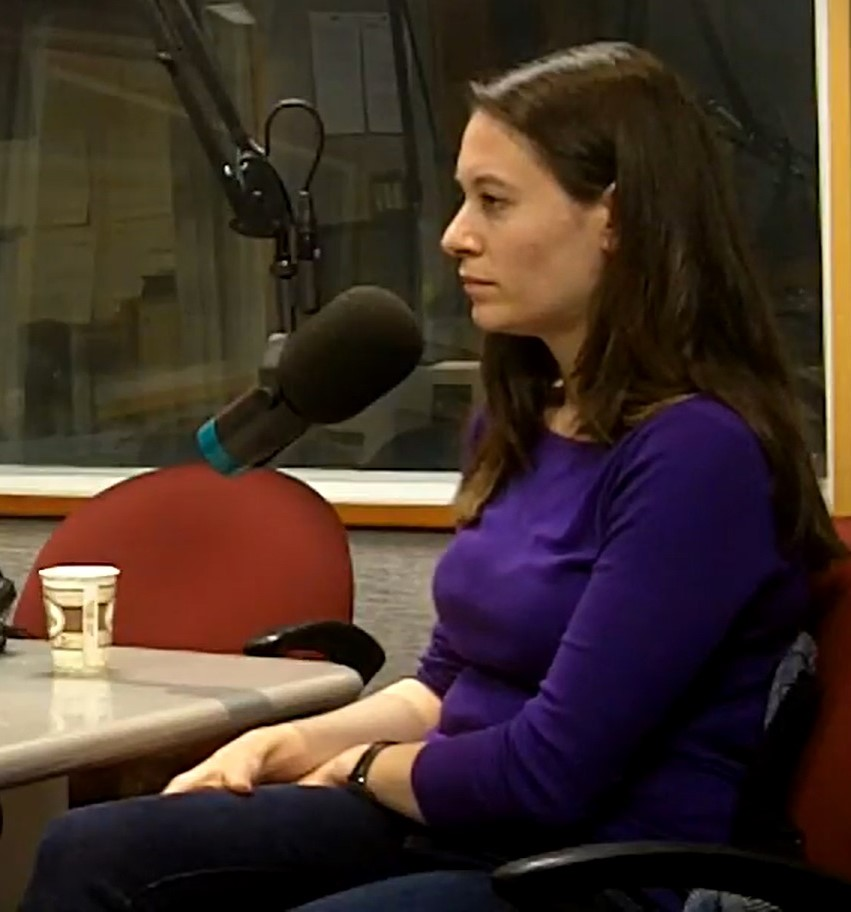
- Burns interviewed in 2012
- Born: October 23, 1982 (age 43); Walpole, New Hampshire, U.S.
- Education: Yale University
- Occupations: Author, public speaker, film
- Spouse: David McMahon
- Father: Ken Burns
- Relatives: Ric Burns (uncle); Lilly Burns (sister)

Sarah Burns is an American author, public speaker, and filmmaker. She is the author of The Central Park Five: A Chronicle of a City Wilding. She is also the co-producer and director for the documentary film The Central Park Five which she co-produced and directed with her husband David McMahon and her father Ken Burns.

== Career ==
Burns became aware of the case of the Central Park Five while working on an undergraduate thesis. The topic of the thesis was racism in media coverage of the Central Park Five. In 2011, Burns wrote the book The Central Park Five: The Untold Story Behind One of New York City’s Most Infamous Crimes. The film and the book re-examine the 1989 case of the Central Park Five, and the wrongful convictions of five teenagers for the rape of the Central Park Jogger. In 2012, the City of New York filed a subpoena demanding the filmmakers and Florentine Films, the production company, provide interviews and footage not used in the film arguing the film was not documentary but advocacy. A judge later ruled in Burns's favor.

In 2016, Burns produced and directed, along with David McMahon and Ken Burns, a two-part, four-hour series titled Jackie Robinson. In 2024, the same trio of filmmakers produced and directed a two-part, four-hour series titled Leonardo da Vinci, about the Italian Renaissance artist and polymath.

== Awards and nominations ==
- 2012 – Best Non-Fiction film of 2012 by the New York Film Critics Circle
- 2013 – Peabody Award, Alliance of Women Film Journalists
- 2013 – Writers Guild of America Award for Best Documentary Screenplay

=== Awards for Central Park Five ===
- Outstanding Achievement by a Woman in the Film Industry (Sarah Burns)
- Black Film Critics Circle Awards – Best Documentary, (Ken Burns, Sarah Burns, David McMahon)
- Black Reel Awards – Black Reel Award for Outstanding Documentary (Sarah Burns, Ken Burns, David McMahon)
- Critics Choice Award – Best Documentary Feature; (Sarah Burns, Ken Burns, David McMahon)
- Chicago Film Critics Association Award; Best Documentary (Sarah Burns, Ken Burns, David McMahon)
- Chicago International Film Festival; Audience Choice Award – Best Documentary Feature (Ken Burns, Sarah Burns, David McMahon)
