= The War (miniseries) =

American television documentary miniseries

- Genre: Documentary
- Written by: Geoffrey C. Ward
- Directed by: Ken Burns; Lynn Novick
- Narrated by: Keith David
- Theme music composer: Wynton Marsalis "American Anthem" music and lyrics by Gene Scheer performed by Norah Jones
- Composer: Wynton Marsalis
- Country of origin: United States
- Original language: English
- No. of episodes: 7

Production
- Producers: Ken Burns; Lynn Novick; Sarah Botstein
- Cinematography: Buddy Squires
- Editors: Paul Barnes; Erik Ewers; Tricia Reidy
- Running time: 14 hours (total)
- Production company: National Endowment for the Humanities

Original release
- Release: September 23 – October 2, 2007

The War is a seven-part American television documentary miniseries about World War II from the perspective of the United States. The program was directed by American filmmakers Ken Burns and Lynn Novick, written by Geoffrey Ward, and narrated primarily by Keith David. It premiered on September 23, 2007. The world premiere of the series took place at the Palace Theater in Luverne, Minnesota, one of the towns featured in the documentary. It was funded in part by the National Endowment for the Humanities.

== Content ==
The series focuses on World War II in a "bottom up" fashion through the lenses of four "quintessentially American towns":

- Luverne, Minnesota
- Mobile, Alabama
- Sacramento, California
- Waterbury, Connecticut

The series recounts the experiences of a number of individuals from these communities as they move through the war in the Pacific, African and European theaters, and focuses on the effect of the war on them, their families and their communities.

Actors including Adam Arkin, Tom Hanks, Keith David, Samuel L. Jackson, Josh Lucas, Bobby Cannavale and Eli Wallach read contemporary newspaper articles, telegrams and letters from the front. People including Daniel Inouye, Sidney Phillips, Joe Medicine Crow and Paul Fussell were interviewed.

The full documentary runs 14 hours and was broadcast in seven parts on PBS over two weeks, starting on Sunday, September 23, 2007 and continuing four nights the first week and three nights the second week, from 8 to 10 p.m. (8 to 10:30 p.m. on three nights). The documentary was provided to PBS affiliates in two versions: One with profanity generally prohibited by FCC regulations (including explanations of the acronyms FUBAR and SNAFU) and one without the expletives.

== Episodes ==
Each episode begins with the introduction:

The Second World War was fought in thousands of places, too many for any one accounting.
This is the story of four American towns and how their citizens experienced that war.

| No. | Title | Original release date |
|---|---|---|
| 1 | "A Necessary War" (December 1941 – December 1942) | September 23, 2007 |
Introduction to the American entry into World War II. Tells us about the four towns mentioned that Burns selected for its wartime experiences and of the residents of those places. By this time, they have already known of the early initial conflicts of World War II in Europe through newspapers and newsreels, but it was only through the attack on Pearl Harbor that roused an isolationist, unprepared country into mobilizing for war. But setbacks arose: The Philippines fell and with it the internment of Americans at Santo Tomas in Manila and the Bataan Death March. American shipping became easy prey for German U-boats along the American coast and in the Atlantic. But America succeeds in stopping the Japanese advances at Midway and Guadalcanal.
| 2 | "When Things Get Tough" (January–December 1943) | September 24, 2007 |
With American industry in full production, the United States entered the European war through the North African Campaign where they, together with Allied forces, eventually defeat the Germans in Tunisia despite the initial disaster in the Battle of Kasserine Pass. The air war over Europe and the bombing of Germany. Allied forces commenced the Italian Campaign through the invasions of Sicily and Salerno, punctuated by the experiences of the soldiers from the towns featured. The internment of Japanese Americans is also further discussed.
| 3 | "A Deadly Calling" (November 1943 – June 1944) | September 25, 2007 |
The American mobilization transformed cities like Mobile, Waterbury, and Sacramento into boom towns. Mobile thrived on its extensive shipyards that employed many African-Americans, but racial segregation hampers the war production effort in the United States, resulting in ugly riots like in Mobile. African-Americans, as well as Japanese-Americans, were nevertheless recruited by the armed forces into combat units and sent into action, though African-American units were still segregated. The American public finally gets to see the bloody sacrifice of their armed forces through pictures published in LIFE: one of these is the dead on the shore of Buna. The American offensive in the Central Pacific begins with the Battle of Tarawa. The grueling and costly battles of Anzio and Monte Cassino in the Italian campaign. Eventually, the Allies triumph and General Clark's forces take Rome.
| 4 | "Pride of Our Nation" (June–August 1944) | September 26, 2007 |
1944: On D-Day, 1.5 million Allied troops embark on the invasion of France, which, after initial setbacks, succeeded. D-Day is followed by the lengthy Battle of Normandy, which ends after three months with the liberation of Paris. The Marines meanwhile fight a costly battle on the island of Saipan in the Western Pacific. These were punctuated by recollections of the participants of the designated towns. The American public, through radio, the press and newsreels, were normally kept informed of the progress of the war. However, as the war progresses, the dreaded War Department casualty telegrams appear at a fast rate.
| 5 | "FUBAR" (September–December 1944) | September 30, 2007 |
This episode starts with the mistaken Allied assumption that the war in Europe would be over before the winter of 1944. It covers Operation Market Garden; the bloody invasion and battle of Peleliu; the incompetence of General Dahlquist and the rescue of the Lost Battalion by the 442nd during the horrendous Battle of Hürtgen Forest. But there are achievements: General MacArthur returns to the Philippines following the US invasion, much of the Japanese fleet was destroyed at the Battle of Leyte Gulf, the heroism of the Japanese-American 442nd Regimental Combat Team; the thrill of the internees at the Santo Tomas internment camp in Manila in seeing American planes strafing Japanese ships in Manila Bay and the fall of Aachen, the first German city to be captured by the Allies. There are the experiences of African-American servicemen and those of American Indians. But the reality is that the war will not end in 1944, and more ground will have to be covered and lives lost to achieve the ultimate victory.
| 6 | "The Ghost Front" (December 1944 – March 1945) | October 1, 2007 |
The Germans launch a major surprise offensive in the Ardennes which becomes known as the Battle of the Bulge; the battle develops into the bloodiest of the war for the Americans. The siege of Bastogne and combat stress reaction during the war. The Santo Tomas internment camp is liberated following the Battle of Manila. The Marines assault Iwo Jima. The controversial air war against Japanese and German cities towards the end of the war. The final invasion of Germany and General Patton's attempts to rescue his son-in-law from a German prison camp behind the German lines. There are also insights into the role of medics in combat, pinups and American POWs in Japan. But still, there are newspaper reports of new setbacks and losses, and the endless and unendurable telegrams bearing the bad news from the War Department.
| 7 | "A World Without War" (March–September 1945) | October 2, 2007 |
The War finally reaches its end: the bloody Battle of Okinawa and the kamikaze attacks. The death of President Roosevelt and the assumption to office of Harry Truman. The Soviets commence their final assault on Berlin. Hitler's suicide and the fall of the Third Reich. The awful reality of Nazi Germany is discovered with the liberation of the Nazi concentration camps and death camps. VE Day following Germany's surrender. The sinking of USS Indianapolis. Plans for the ultimate, long, and bloody conquest of Japan. The atomic bombings of Hiroshima and Nagasaki. The liberation of the American POWs in Japan and VJ Day following the Japanese surrender at the USS Missouri. The episode concludes with the return and reunification of the American fighting men, and the fates of the towns and personalities first featured earlier in this series as they, and the United States, continue with the business of living in a postwar world. Extras: This is followed by David Brancaccio interviewing Ken Burns, Rev. Forbes, and Lynn Novick about what they were attempting to accomplish in this production.

== International releases ==
In some countries, notably Australia, Switzerland, Austria, France and Germany, The War was released as a 14-episode series. The region 4 DVD release of The War splits the series into 14 episodes, but notes that it is "a seven-part documentary".

== Critical reception ==
TIME magazine's James Poniewozik named the series one of the Top 10 New TV Series of 2007, ranking it at no. 9. Barry Garron of The Hollywood Reporter called The War an "artful masterpiece" and "[e]ven more ambitious than any previous Burns documentary, including 'The Civil War,'" for its wide-ranging illustration of the impact of World War II on the United States and its citizens. John Leonard of New York magazine also commended the miniseries, stating that though the documentary covers areas of the subject that have already been tackled in other World War II documentaries, "it's the nuanced, retrospective witness that makes the series so affecting, the testimonies of survivors who remember both who it is they used to be and the 408,000 fellow Americans who didn't make it." Brian Lowry, writing for Variety, praised the miniseries as "a major victory for PBS", stating that it is "[a] monumental undertaking filled with moments of tremendous poignancy", though he noted that "The most significant quibble here is structural.... just when some stories begin to get interesting, that character is left, only to be returned to hours (and given the broadcast pattern, nights) later."

Robert Koehler, another critic for Variety, found fault in the miniseries focusing mainly on the United States' role in World War II, emphasizing that it was unable to explore the various other conflicts in the war in depth such as the Japanese invasion of East and Southeast Asia and Operation Barbarossa. Alessandra Stanley, writing for the New York Times, gave the series a mixed review, praising it as a "respectful, moving and meticulously illustrated anthology of small-town lives turned upside down by what one elderly veteran calls 'a necessary war,'" while also faulting it for "view[ing] the Second World War as a mostly domestic concern" in which "the London blitz, Stalingrad, Bergen-Belsen and the Warsaw uprising are parentheses." Slate's Beverly Gage echoed these thoughts saying "it's rousing and meaningful and not technically inaccurate, but not exactly the whole truth." Jonathan Storm of The Philadelphia Inquirer wrote, "Once-in-a-lifetime viewing."

Keith David received a Primetime Emmy Award for Outstanding Voice-Over Performance for his narration of the series.

== Controversy ==
The War came under fire after previews during the editing process indicated no mention of the contributions of Hispanics to the war effort, whose representation in the war itself is estimated at up to half a million people; complaints followed later as to omissions of Hispanic and Native American contributions and those of women in uniform. Originally the premiere was scheduled for September 16, 2007; that this date is both Mexican Independence Day and the start of U.S. observance of National Hispanic Heritage Month drew additional criticism from its detractors, and the initial airdate was later moved to September 23, 2007, with no comment from PBS.

Although at first the dispute seemed to be settled with the inclusion of additional footage to address the omission, in subsequent weeks, groups began to question conflicting reports from Burns and PBS as to whether the additional footage would be provided as supplementary material or would be integrated into the overall program. Burns initially insisted that re-editing the series was out of the question, with PBS defending that decision on the basis of artistic freedom. Over the months of May and June, as of mid-July, 2007, estimates put out by Burns suggested that additional footage showing interviews with two Hispanics and one Native American would be added to the series, for a total of 28 minutes additional footage to the 14 hours the program was originally planned to cover; the additional footage would air at the conclusion of the selected episodes, but before each episode's final credits.

News outlets began to report as of July 11 that the additional content had not been included in materials made available for preview by television writers and critics, prompting renewed discussion and speculation as to the eventual outcome of the debate.

== Criticism ==
The series has been strongly criticised due its almost exclusive focus on the American experience. Although Burns structured the series to explore the human cost of the conflict through the lens of four representative American communities, historians and international media commentators argued that this approach presented a geographically and strategically skewed narrative of a global conflict.

Critics highlighted that by centering the narrative on the American home front and U.S. service members, the documentary minimized the contributions and casualties of other Allied nations. In particular, scholars noted the brief coverage given to the Eastern Front, where the Soviet Union sustained the majority of Allied casualties fighting Nazi Germany, as well as the limited focus on British, Commonwealth and Chinese military theaters. Critics contended that this framing reinforced the popular national myth that the United States was primarily responsible for the Allied victory.

Media historians pointed out that the documentary lacked the multi-perspective framework present in Burns's later project, The Vietnam War (2017), which incorporated interviews with North Vietnamese soldiers and civilians. In The War, Axis combatants and foreign civilians were largely depicted as secondary figures, providing little coverage of enemy strategic doctrines or the civilian devastation across Europe and Asia.

Military historians noted the documentary offered viewers limited context regarding the global geopolitical forces that shaped the war and its immediate aftermath.
