= Brooklyn Bridge (film) =

- Directed by: Ken Burns
- Written by: Amy Stechler
- Produced by: Ken Burns; Roger Sherman; Buddy Squires; Amy Stechler
- Narrated by: David McCullough
- Cinematography: Ken Burns; Buddy Squires
- Edited by: Amy Stechler
- Music by: John Colby
- Production companies: Florentine Films; WETA-TV; WNET
- Distributed by: PBS
- Release date: November 8, 1981
- Running time: 58 minutes
- Country: United States
- Language: English

Brooklyn Bridge is a documentary film on the history of the Brooklyn Bridge and the directorial debut of Ken Burns. It was produced by Burns, Roger Sherman, Buddy Squires, and Amy Stechler in 1981.

== Synopsis ==
The film included interviews with personalities such as The New York Times architectural critic Paul Goldberger and writer Arthur Miller plus film clips featuring Bugs Bunny (Bowery Bugs) and Frank Sinatra. It was narrated by historian David McCullough, who wrote the 1972 book the film was based on.

== Accolades ==
The film was nominated for an Academy Award for Best Documentary Feature.

In 2025, it was selected for preservation in the United States National Film Registry by the Library of Congress as being "culturally, historically or aesthetically significant."

== Broadcast history ==
The film was rebroadcast nationally twice: on January 29, 1992, preceding the then-new documentary from Burns, Empire of the Air: The Men Who Made Radio, and on October 21, 2002, as part of Ken Burns: America's Stories.
