= Ken Burns =

American documentarian and filmmaker (born 1953)

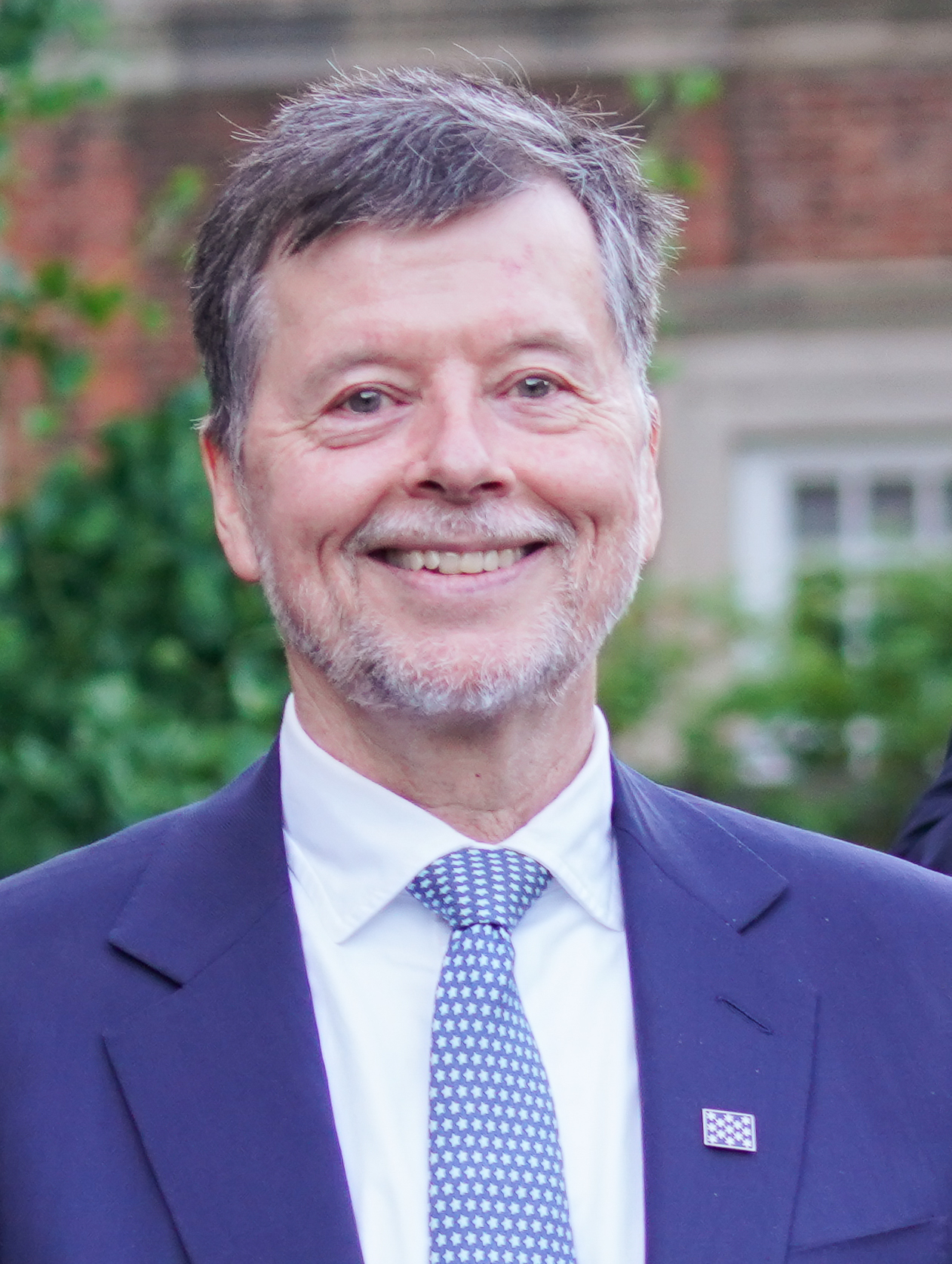
- Burns in 2026
- Born: Kenneth Lauren Burns; July 29, 1953 (age 73); Brooklyn, New York, U.S.
- Education: Hampshire College (BA)
- Occupation: Filmmaker
- Years active: 1976–present
- Notable work: The Civil War (1990); Baseball (1994); Jazz (2001); The National Parks (2009); The Roosevelts (2014); The Vietnam War (2017); Country Music (2019); The American Revolution (2025)
- Spouses: Amy Stechler Burns (m. 1982; div. 1993); Julie Deborah Brown (m. 2003)
- Children: 4, including Sarah and Lilly Burns
- Relatives: Ric Burns (brother)
- Website: kenburns.com

Kenneth Lauren Burns (born July 29, 1953) is an American filmmaker and popular historical documentarian. An undergraduate of Hampshire College, his works typically chronicle American history and culture, and are often produced in association with WETA-TV or the National Endowment for the Humanities, distributed by PBS. Burns has received critical and scholarly acclaim for several of his documentaries, including two Academy Award nominations, two Grammy Awards, three Peabody Awards, and eight Emmy Awards, among other accolades.

His most widely known works include The Civil War (1990), Baseball (1994), Jazz (2001), The War (2007), The National Parks: America's Best Idea (2009), Prohibition (2011), The Roosevelts (2014), The Vietnam War (2017), Country Music (2019), Benjamin Franklin (2022), and The American Revolution (2025). In addition, he co-directed The Central Park Five in 2012 with his daughter, Sarah Burns. He produced The West (1996), Cancer: The Emperor of All Maladies (2015) and The Gene: An Intimate History (2020).

== Early life and education ==
Kenneth Lauren Burns was born on July 29, 1953, in Brooklyn, New York. His parents were Lyla Smith (née Tupper) Burns, a biotechnician, and Robert Kyle Burns Jr., who at the time of Ken's birth was a graduate student in cultural anthropology at Columbia University. The documentary filmmaker Ric Burns is his younger brother.

Burns' academic family moved frequently, including to Saint-Véran, France; Newark, Delaware; and Ann Arbor, Michigan; where his father taught at the University of Michigan.

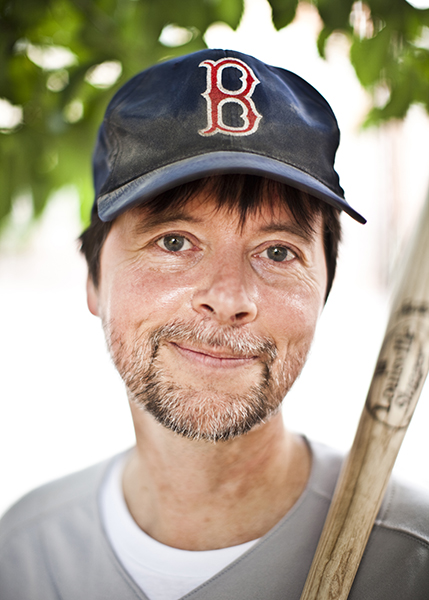
Ken Burns in a Boston Red Sox cap in 2010

Burns' mother was diagnosed with breast cancer when he was three, and she died when he was 11, a circumstance that he said helped shape his career; he credited his psychologist father-in-law, Gerald Stechler, with a significant insight: "He told me that my whole work was an attempt to make people long gone come back alive." He recalls:

a searing memory of the summer of 1962, when I was almost 9, joining our family dinner on a hot, sweltering day in a tract house in a development in Newark, Delaware, and seeing my mother crying. She had just learned, and my brother and I had just been told, that she would be dead of cancer within six months. But that’s not what was causing her tears. Our inadequate health insurance had practically bankrupted us, and our neighbors – equally struggling working people – had taken up a collection and presented my parents with six crisp $20 bills – $120 in total – enough to keep us solvent for more than a month. In that moment, I understood something about community and courage, about constant struggle and little victories. That hot June evening was a victory. And I have spent my entire professional life trying to resurrect small moments within the larger sweep of American history, trying to find our better angels in the most difficult of circumstances, trying to wake the dead, to hear their stories.

Well-read as a child, he engrossed himself in the family encyclopedia, preferring history to fiction.

Upon receiving an 8 mm film movie camera for his 17th birthday, he shot a documentary about an Ann Arbor factory. He graduated from Pioneer High School in Ann Arbor in 1971. Declining reduced tuition to attend the University of Michigan, he instead attended Hampshire College in Amherst, Massachusetts, where students are graded through narrative evaluations rather than letter grades, and where students create self-directed academic concentrations instead of choosing a traditional major.

Burns worked in a record store to help pay his tuition. He lived on as little as $2,500 in two years in Walpole, New Hampshire. Burns studied under photographers Jerome Liebling, Elaine Mayes, and others. He earned his Bachelor of Arts degree in film studies and design in 1975.

== Florentine Films ==
In 1976, Burns, Elaine Mayes, and college classmate Roger Sherman founded a production company named Florentine Films in Walpole, New Hampshire. The company's name was borrowed from Mayes's hometown of Florence, Massachusetts. Another Hampshire College student, Buddy Squires, was invited to succeed Mayes as a founding member one year later. The trio were later joined by a fourth member, Lawrence "Larry" Hott. Hott did not actually matriculate at Hampshire, but worked on films there. Hott had begun his career as an attorney, having attended nearby Western New England Law School.

Each member works independently, but releases content under the shared name of Florentine Films. As such, their individual "subsidiary" companies include Ken Burns Media, Sherman Pictures, and Hott Productions. Burns's oldest child, Sarah, is also an employee of the company as of 2020.

== Career ==
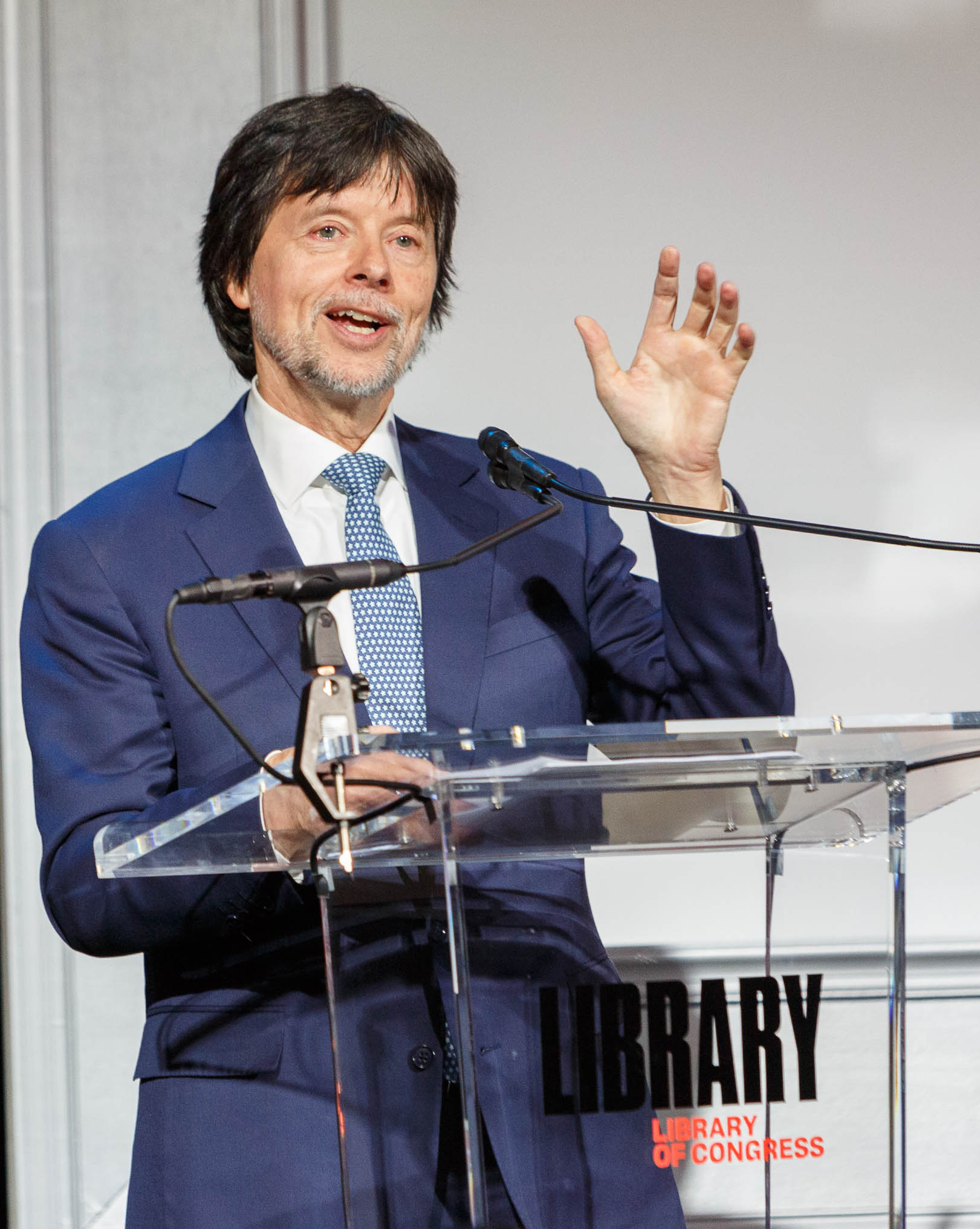
Burns speaks at the Library of Congress in 2019

Burns initially worked as a cinematographer for the BBC, Italian television, and others. In 1977, having completed some documentary short films, he began work on adapting David McCullough's book The Great Bridge, about the construction of the Brooklyn Bridge. Developing a signature style of documentary filmmaking in which he "adopted the technique of cutting rapidly from one still picture to another in a fluid, linear fashion [and] then pepped up the visuals with 'first hand' narration gleaned from contemporary writings and recited by top stage and screen actors", Burns made the feature documentary Brooklyn Bridge (1981), which was narrated by David McCullough, earned an Academy Award nomination for Best Documentary and ran on PBS in the United States.

Following another documentary, The Shakers: Hands to Work, Hearts to God (1984), Burns was nominated again for an Oscar for The Statue of Liberty (1985). Burns frequently collaborates with author and historian Geoffrey C. Ward, notably on documentaries such as The Civil War, Jazz, Baseball, and the 10-part TV series The Vietnam War (aired September 2017).

Burns has built a long, successful career producing and directing well-received television documentaries and documentary miniseries, mostly on different aspects of United States history. His body of work covers diverse subjects, including art (Thomas Hart Benton, 1988), mass media (Empire of the Air: The Men Who Made Radio, 1991), sports (Baseball, 1994, updated with 10th Inning, 2010), political history (Thomas Jefferson, 1997), music (Jazz, 2001; Country Music, 2019), literature (Mark Twain, 2001; Hemingway, 2021), environmentalism (The National Parks, 2009), and war (the 15-hour World War II documentary The War, 2007; and the 11-hour The Civil War, 1990, which All Media Guide says "many consider his 'chef d'oeuvre'"). "It's the most important event in American history, [...] I think the Civil War is an unbelievable guide to who we are" he says in interviews.

In 2007, Burns concluded an agreement with PBS to produce work for the network well into the next decade. According to a 2017 piece in The New Yorker, Burns and his company, Florentine Films, have selected topics for documentaries slated for release by 2030. These topics include country music, the Mayo Clinic, Muhammad Ali, Ernest Hemingway, the American Revolution, Lyndon B. Johnson, Barack Obama, Winston Churchill, the U.S. criminal justice system, and African-American history from the Civil War to the Great Migration. On April 5, 2021, Hemingway, a three-episode, six-hour documentary, a recapitulation of Hemingway's life, labors, and loves, debuted on the Public Broadcasting System, co-produced and directed by Burns and Lynn Novick.

In April 2025, Burns released a two-part documentary on Leonardo da Vinci, broadcast on Arte. Titled Art and Experience, followed by The Quest for Beauty, the project marked a departure from his usual focus on American history. The project examined the life and work of the Renaissance polymath through Burns' characteristic documentary style.

== Personal life ==
In 1979, Burns moved from Manhattan, New York City, to Walpole, New Hampshire, where he rented a house that he eventually bought. The original reason for the move was that his rent in Manhattan rose from US$275 to $325 (from US$1,220 to $1,442 in 2025 dollars). He has credited the move to the small town with ultimately jump-starting his later success, and he still resides there to this day.

In 1982, Burns married Amy Stechler. The couple had two daughters, Sarah and Lilly. Their marriage ended in divorce in 1993.

On October 18, 2003, Burns married Julie Deborah Brown, daughter of Leslie Mundjer and the Smith Barney senior vice president Richard Brown. Julie Deborah Brown founded Room to Grow, a non-profit organization providing aid to children separated from their families. They have two daughters.

Burns is a descendant of Johannes de Peyster Sr. through Gerardus Clarkson, an American Revolutionary War physician from Philadelphia, and he is a distant relative of Scottish poet Robert Burns. In 2014, Burns appeared in Henry Louis Gates's Finding Your Roots where he discovered that he is a descendant of a slave owner from the Deep South, in addition to having a lineage which traces back to Colonial Americans of Loyalist allegiance during the American Revolution.

Burns is an avid quilt collector. About one-third of the quilts from his personal collection were displayed at the International Quilt Museum at the University of Nebraska–Lincoln from January 19 to May 13, 2018.

When asked if he would ever make a film regarding his mother Lyla, Burns responded: "All of my films are about her. I don't think I could do it directly, because of how intensely painful it is."

On episode #2336 of The Joe Rogan Experience, Burns was interviewed by podcaster Joe Rogan about his life and filmography.

=== Politics ===
Burns previewing The American Revolution (2025) at the LBJ Presidential Library at UT Austin

Burns is a longtime supporter of the Democratic Party, describing himself as a “yellow-dog Democrat” and contributing almost $40,000 in political donations. In 2008, the Democratic National Committee chose Burns to produce the introductory video for Senator Ted Kennedy's August 2008 speech to the Democratic National Convention, a video described by Politico as a "Burns-crafted tribute casting him [Kennedy] as the modern Ulysses bringing his party home to port."

In August 2009, Kennedy died, and Burns produced a short eulogy video at his funeral. In endorsing Barack Obama for the U.S. presidency in December 2007, Burns compared Obama to Abraham Lincoln. He said he had planned to be a regular contributor to Countdown with Keith Olbermann on Current TV. In 2016, he also delivered a commencement speech at Stanford University criticizing Donald Trump. He also criticized the media for devoting so much airtime to him and failing to give him scrutiny: "Many of our media institutions have largely failed to expose this charlatan, torn between a nagging responsibility to good journalism and the big ratings a media circus always delivers. In fact, they have given him the abundant airtime he so desperately craves, so much so that it has actually worn down our natural human revulsion to this kind of behavior. Hey, he’s rich; he must be doing something right. He is not. Edward R. Murrow would have exposed this naked emperor months ago."

In 2023, a 2013 photograph of Ken Burns and Clarence Thomas at a Koch Brothers fundraising event was made public in a Pro Publica article about Justice Thomas' connections to right-wing activists. Burns stated that the encounter was a brief social encounter resulting from Charles Koch's support of PBS programming.

== Awards and honors ==
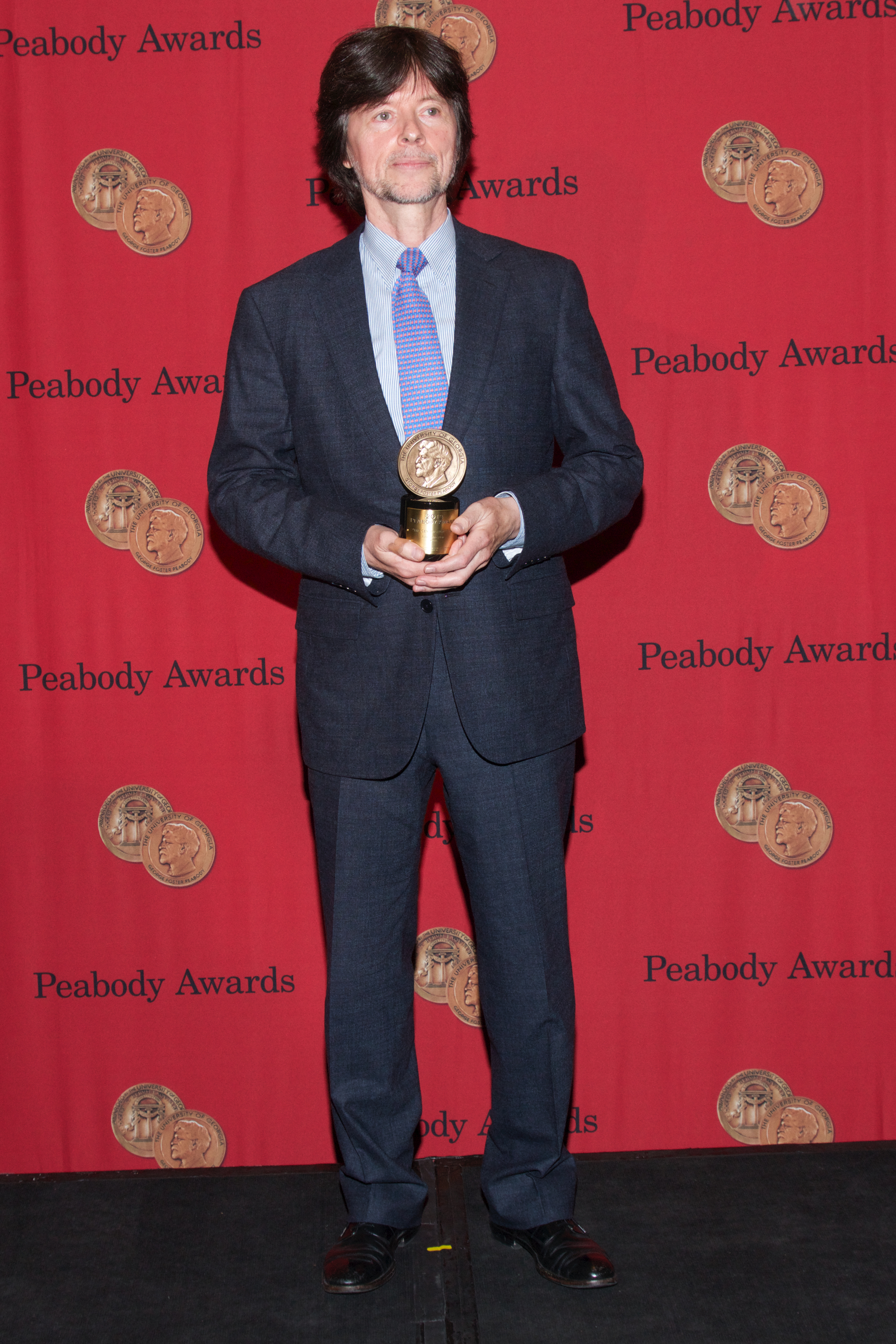
Burns with the Peabody Award for The Central Park Five in 2014

Altogether, Burns's work has garnered several awards, including two Oscar nominations, two Grammy Awards and eight Emmy Awards.

- 1982 nomination, Academy Award for Documentary Feature: Brooklyn Bridge (1981);
- 1986 nomination, Academy Award for Documentary Feature: The Statue of Liberty (1985);
- 1995 Emmy Award for Outstanding Informational Series: Baseball (1994);
- 2010 Emmy Award for Outstanding Non-fiction Series: The National Parks: America's Best Idea (2009).

The Civil War received more than 40 major film and television awards, including two Emmy Awards, two Grammy Awards (one for Best Traditional Folk Album), the Producer of the Year Award from the Producers Guild of America, a People's Choice Award, a Peabody Award, a duPont-Columbia Award, a D. W. Griffith Award, and the $50,000 Lincoln Prize.

In 1991, Burns received the National Humanities Medal, then called the Charles Frankel Prize in the Humanities.

In 1991, Burns received the Golden Plate Award of the American Academy of Achievement.

In 2004, Burns received the S. Roger Horchow Award for Greatest Public Service by a Private Citizen, an award given out annually by Jefferson Awards.

In 2008, Burns was honored by the Academy of Television Arts & Sciences with a Lifetime Achievement Award.

In 2008, Burns received The Lincoln Forum's Richard Nelson Current Award of Achievement.

In 2010, the National Parks Conservation Association honored him and Dayton Duncan with the Robin W. Winks Award for Enhancing Public Understanding of National Parks. The award recognizes an individual or organization that has effectively communicated the values of the National Park System to the American public. As of 2010, there is a Ken Burns Wing at the Jerome Liebling Center for Film, Photography and Video at Hampshire College.

Burns was elected to the American Philosophical Society in 2011.

In 2012, Burns received the Washington University International Humanities Medal. The medal, awarded biennially and accompanied by a cash prize of $25,000, is given to honor a person whose humanistic endeavors in scholarship, journalism, literature, or the arts have made a difference in the world. Past winners include Turkish novelist Orhan Pamuk in 2006, journalist Michael Pollan in 2008, and novelist and nonfiction writer Francine Prose in 2010.

In 2013, Burns received the John Steinbeck Award, an award presented annually by Steinbeck's eldest son, Thomas, in collaboration with the John Steinbeck Family Foundation, San Jose State University, and the Martha Heasley Cox Center for Steinbeck Studies.

In May 2015, Burns gave the commencement address at Washington University in St. Louis and received an honorary doctorate of humanities.

Burns was the grand marshal for the 2016 Pasadena Tournament of Roses' Rose Parade on New Year's Day in Pasadena, California. The National Endowment for the Humanities selected Burns to deliver the 2016 Jefferson Lecture, the U.S. federal government's highest honor for achievement in the humanities, on the topic of race in America. He was the 2017 recipient of The Nichols-Chancellor's Medal at Vanderbilt University.

In 2019, he received an honorary degree from Brown University.

In 2022 he served as the commencement speaker at the University of Pennsylvania and received an Honorary Doctor of Arts.

In 2025, he received the Critics Choice Documentary Awards IMPACT Award. The prestigious award recognizes documentarians whose work has "illuminated our shared story, made complex issues accessible to broad audiences, and sparked meaningful dialogue that inspires reflection and action. Ken Burns exemplifies this impact through a career that has brought the American experience vividly to life and deepened the nation’s understanding of itself." It was presented at the 10th Annual Critics Choice Documentary Awards on November 9 at the Edison Ballroom, New York City.

That same year, Brooklyn Bridge was inducted into the National Film Registry.

On January 28, 2026, the National Society of the Sons of the American Revolution presented Burns with the SAR Gold Good Citizenship Award following the Angel Night Dinner at Rancho Mirage Writers Festival.

In 2026, he received an honorary degree from the College of William and Mary as the university celebrated the 333rd anniversary of its 1693 royal charter.

== Style ==
Burns frequently incorporates simple musical leitmotifs or melodies. For example, The Civil War features a distinctive violin melody throughout, "Ashokan Farewell", which was performed for the film by its composer, fiddler Jay Ungar. One critic noted, "One of the most memorable things about The Civil War was its haunting, repeated violin melody, whose thin, yearning notes seemed somehow to sum up all the pathos of that great struggle."

A demonstration of the filmography of the Ken Burns effect

Burns often gives life to still photographs by slowly zooming out subjects of interest and panning from one subject to another. It has long been used in film production where it is known as the "rostrum camera". This technique, possible in many professional and home software applications, is now termed the "Ken Burns effect" in Apple's iPhoto, iMovie, and Final Cut Pro X software applications. Burns stated in a 2009 interview that he initially declined to have his name associated with the software because of his stance to refuse commercial endorsements. However, Apple chief Steve Jobs negotiated to give Burns Apple equipment, which Burns donated to nonprofit organizations.

As a museum retrospective noted, "His PBS specials [are] strikingly out of step with the visual pyrotechnics and frenetic pacing of most reality-based TV programming, relying instead on techniques that are literally decades old, although Burns reintegrates these constituent elements into a wholly new and highly complex textual arrangement."

In a 2011 interview, Burns stated that he admires and is influenced by filmmaker Errol Morris.

== Filmography ==
Conversation with Ken Burns about The Vietnam War. Video by the LBJ Library

- Brooklyn Bridge (1981) (Note: Listed as "Kenneth Lauren Burns")
- The Shakers: Hands to Work, Hearts to God (1984)
- The Statue of Liberty (1985)
- Huey Long (1985)
- Thomas Hart Benton (1988)
- The Congress (1988)
- The Civil War (1990; 9 episodes)
- Empire of the Air: The Men Who Made Radio (1992)
- Baseball (1994; 9 episodes – updated with The Tenth Inning in 2010, with Lynn Novick)
- Thomas Jefferson (1997; 2 episodes)
- Lewis & Clark: The Journey of the Corps of Discovery (1997)
- Frank Lloyd Wright (1998, with Lynn Novick)
- Not for Ourselves Alone: The Story of Elizabeth Cady Stanton & Susan B. Anthony (1999)
- Jazz (2001; 10 episodes)
- Mark Twain (2002)
- Horatio's Drive: America's First Road Trip (2003)
- Unforgivable Blackness: The Rise and Fall of Jack Johnson (2005; 2 episodes)
- The War (2007, with Lynn Novick; 7 episodes)
- The National Parks: America's Best Idea (2009; 6 episodes)
- Prohibition (2011, with Lynn Novick; 3 episodes)
- The Dust Bowl (2012; 2 episodes)
- The Central Park Five (2012, with Sarah Burns and David McMahon)
- Yosemite: A Gathering of Spirit (2013)
- The Address (2014)
- The Roosevelts: An Intimate History (2014; 7 episodes)
- Jackie Robinson (2016, with Sarah Burns and David McMahon; 2 episodes)
- Defying the Nazis: The Sharps' War (2016, with Artemis Joukowsky III)
- The Vietnam War (2017, with Lynn Novick; 10 episodes)
- The Mayo Clinic: Faith – Hope – Science (2018, with Erik Ewers and Christopher Loren Ewers)
- Country Music (2019, 8 episodes)
- Hemingway (2021, with Lynn Novick; 3 episodes)
- Muhammad Ali (2021, with Sarah Burns and David McMahon; 4 episodes)
- Benjamin Franklin (2022, 2 episodes)
- The U.S. and the Holocaust (2022, 3 episodes; produced and directed with the assistance of Lynn Novick and Sarah Botstein)
- The American Buffalo (2023, 2 episodes)
- Leonardo da Vinci (2024, with Sarah Burns and David McMahon; 2 episodes)
- The American Revolution (2025, 6 episodes)

=== Future releases ===
- Emancipation to Exodus (2027, with David McMahon, Sarah Burns, and Erika Dilday)
- LBJ & the Great Society (2028, with Lynn Novick and Sarah Botstein)

=== Short films ===
These three short films are collected and distributed together as Seeing, Searching, Being: William Segal.

- William Segal (1992)
- Vezelay (1996)
- In the Marketplace (2000)

=== As an executive producer ===
- The West (1996) (directed by Stephen Ives)
- Cancer: The Emperor of All Maladies (2015) (directed by Barak Goodman)
- Walden (short, 2017) (directed by Erik Ewers and Christopher Loren Ewers)
- Country Music: Live at the Ryman, a Concert Celebrating the Film by Ken Burns (2019) (directed by Don Carr)
- College Behind Bars (2019) (directed by Lynn Novick)
- East Lake Meadows: A Public Housing Story (2020) (directed by Sarah Burns and David McMahon)
- The Gene: An Intimate History (2020) (directed by Chris Durrance and Jack Youngelson)
- Hiding in Plain Sight: Youth Mental Illness (2022) (directed by Erik Ewers and Christopher Loren Ewers)
- The American Revolution (2025)
- Henry David Thoreau (2026, 3 episodes, as Executive Producer)

=== As an actor ===
- Gettysburg (film; 1993) – Hancock's staff officer
- Clifford's Puppy Days – Season 1, episode 24a ("Lights, Camera, Action"; 2005) – self
- The Simpsons:
  - Season 14, episode 10 ("Pray Anything"; 2003) – self (voice)
  - Season 22, episode 22 ("The Ned-liest Catch"; 2011) – self (voice)
  - Season 24, episode 1 ("Moonshine River"; 2012) – self (voice)
  - Season 30, episode 22 ("Woo-Hoo Dunnit?"; 2019) – self (voice)
  - Season 35, episode 4 ("Thirst Trap: A Corporate Love Story"; 2023) – self (voice)
- The Mindy Project – Season 3, episode 11 ("Christmas"; 2014) – self (voice)
- Difficult People – Season 2, episode 4 ("Blade Stallion"; 2016) – self (voice)
