= Amy Stechler =

American documentary filmmaker (1955–2022)

Amy Georgeanne Stechler (June 23, 1955 – August 26, 2022) was an American documentary filmmaker.

She attended Hampshire College with the other founders of Florentine Films. Upon graduation she worked at Florentine Films alongside Ken Burns on their early documentaries Brooklyn Bridge (1981), The Shakers: Hands to Work, Hearts to God (1984), and The Statue of Liberty (1985). Her 2005 film The Life and Times of Frida Kahlo was nominated for an Emmy.

Stechler was born in New Haven, Connecticut, and lived most of her adult life in Walpole, New Hampshire. She was married to Ken Burns from 1982 to 1993.
