= List of documentary films about China =

This is a list of documentary films about China. Some included works may be alternatively classified as television documentaries or television series episodes.

- Ascension (2021)
- Behind the Strings (2020), the westward journeys of Shanghai Quartet's members out of the Cultural Revolution
- BBC Reggie in China (2020)
- Hooligan Sparrow (2016)
- Guangzhou Dream Factory (2016)
- Behemoth, 2015, Director: Zhao Liang - documentary about miners
- The Chinese Mayor (2015)
- China Remix - African Hip-Hop Artists in China (2015)
- BBC Secrets of China (2015)
- China Rising, Latest World News (Al Jazeera), 4 episodes
- Diaoyu Islands - The Truth (2014 Film) (2014)
- Human Harvest (2014)
- TIBET - The Truth (2013)
- Living with Dead Hearts (2013)
- Ai Weiwei: Never Sorry (2012)
- Restoring the Light (2011)
- Dreamwork China (2011)
- China's Century of Humiliation - Documentary Film (2011)
- The Warriors of Qiugang (2011)
- China Wow! (2010-?)
- The Ditch (2010) (Chinese: 告别夹边沟)
- China: The Rebirth of an Empire (2010)
- Beijing Taxi (2010)
- Transmission 6-10 (2009)
- Last Train Home (2009)
- People's Republic of Capitalism (2009)
- China's Unnatural Disaster: The Tears of Sichuan Province (2009)
- Tongzhi in Love (2008)
- Dynamic China (2007)
- Up the Yangtze (2007)
- Mao’s Bloody Revolution Revealed / Mao, une histoire chinoise (2007)
- The Blood of Yingzhou District (2006)
- China from the Inside (2006)
- Discovery Atlas: China Revealed (2006)
- Tibet: Murder in the Snow (2006)
- Declassified: Chairman Mao (2006)
- Declassified: Tiananmen Square (2006)
- The Tank Man (2006)
- Mardi Gras: Made in China (2005)
- China Blue (2005)
- Seoul Train (2005)
- China's Lost Girls (2004)
- From China with Love (2004)
- China in the Red (2003)
- Morning Sun (2003)
- China 21 (2001)
- American Experience: Nixon's China Game (2000)
- Citizen Hong Kong (1999)
- Comrades (1999)
- Sunrise Over Tiananmen Square (1998)
- China: A Century of Revolution – Part Three: Born Under the Red Flag 1976-1997 (1997)
- The Gate of Heavenly Peace (1995)
- Moving the Mountain (1995)
- The Dying Rooms (1995)
- Chinese Roots (1994)
- China: A Century of Revolution – Part Two: The Mao Years 1949-1976 (1994)
- Timewatch Chairman Mao: The Last Emperor (1993)
- China: A Century of Revolution – Part One: China in Revolution 1911-1949 (1989)
- China Diary (1989)
- River Elegy (Chinese: 河殇)
- China Rises
- Mao Tse Tung: China's Peasant Emperor
- How Yukong Moved the Mountains(1976), a series of 12 documentary films about the Cultural Revolution
- Chung Kuo, Cina, an Italian documentary directed by Michelangelo Antonioni (1972)
- Report From China (3 part series, 90 minutes total runtime) Originally titled "Country of Dawn" (1966/1967)
- China: The Roots of Madness (1967)
