= Brian Keane =

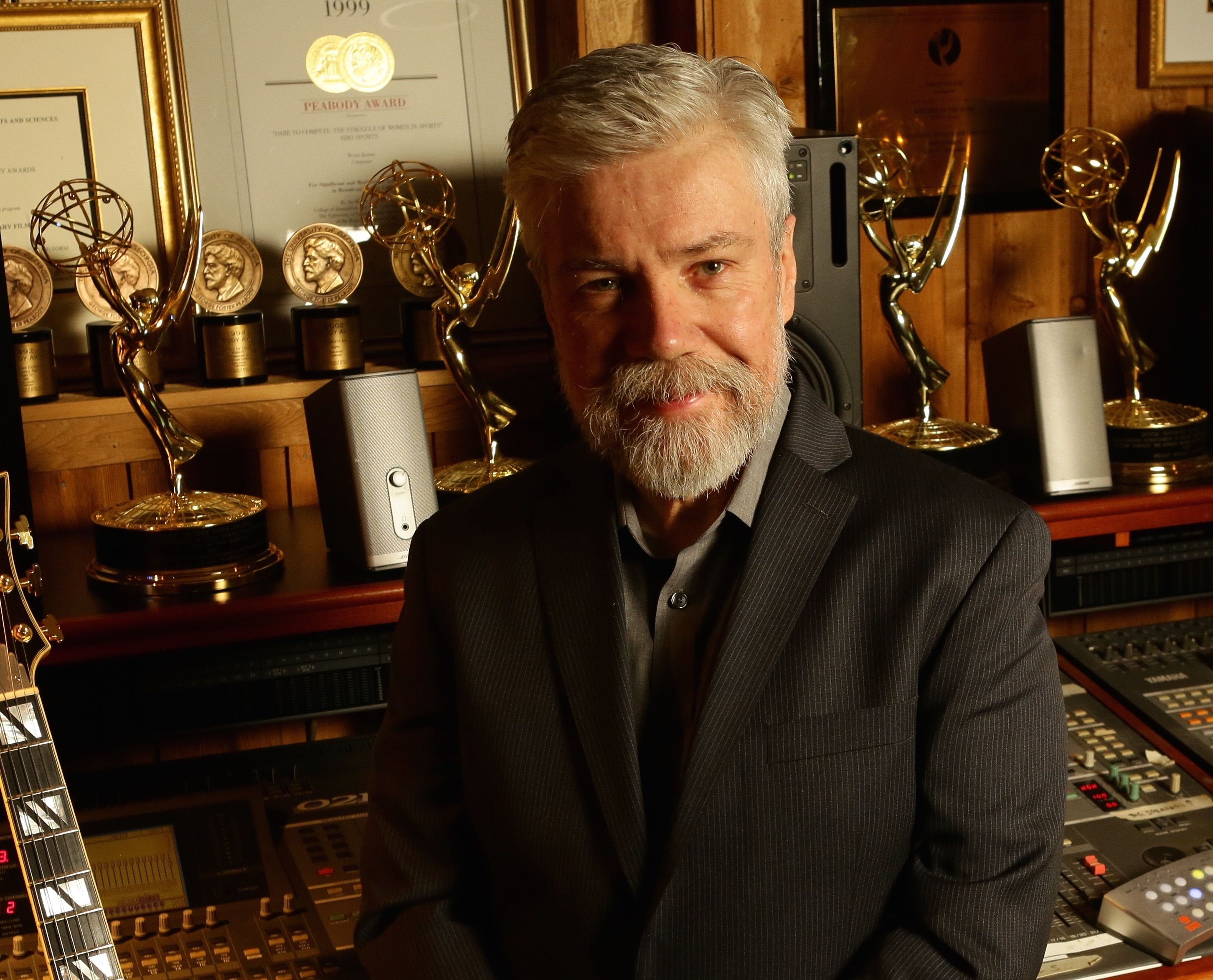
- Brian Keane in his home studio in 2018

Background information
- Born: January 18, 1953 (age 73); Philadelphia, Pennsylvania
- Occupations: Composer, music producer, guitarist
- Instrument: Guitar
- Years active: 1970s–present
- Website: briankeanemusic.com

Brian Keane (born January 18, 1953) is an American composer, music producer, and guitarist. Keane has been described as "a musician's musician, a composer's composer, and one of the most talented producers of a generation" by Billboard magazine.

Keane grew up in Westport, Connecticut, and started his career as a guitarist, eventually touring and recording in a duo with Larry Coryell. Best known as a composer, Keane's first music score for a documentary came in 1980 with Against Wind and Tide: A Cuban Odyssey, which was nominated for an Academy Award. As the cable television business bloomed in the 1980s, Keane quickly became one of the foremost pioneers in documentary music scoring. By the 1990s The Hollywood Reporter respectfully called him "the John Williams of the documentary".

Keane has worked with every major network, and many multi award-winning filmmakers including Barry Levinson, Ric Burns, Susan Lacy, Henry Hampton, Stephen King, and Thomas Lennon, scoring some of the most memorable documentaries in television history such as the epic Burns history of New York in New York: A Documentary Film, the inspiring story of the 1980 Olympic hockey team in Do You Believe in Miracles? and The Battle Over Citizen Kane. Keane also pioneered a new approach to scoring sports programming with his innovative Emmy winning work for HBO and ESPN, and created the music for the groundbreaking ABC News Turning Point in the early days of prime-time documentaries. In addition, Brian has scored the music to several feature films, his music catalog is licensed by most major entertainment companies, and his music is performed all over the world.

It was a soundtrack release of his score to the 1987 documentary Süleyman the Magnificent that would launch Keane's career as a Grammy winning world music producer. That score revolutionized Middle Eastern music and launched the career of Omar Faruk Tekbilek. Keane would become a leading producer of world music in the 1980s and 1990s after that, working with artists as diverse as Linda Ronstadt, Pete Seeger, Joanie Madden, Taj Mahal, Michael Hedges, Buckwheat Zydeco, Yomo Toro, Cyrus Chestnut, David Darling, John Sebastian, Arlo Guthrie and The Clancy Brothers. Keane won a Grammy Award for his 1998 soundtrack Long Journey Home: The Irish in America with the Chieftains, Van Morrison, and Elvis Costello, among others. He has received several other Grammy nominations as well. Brian produced more than 150 records in his career, 37 of which were Billboard Top Ten charting.

With a career spanning well over 40 years, scoring over 700 film and television shows, garnering six Academy Awards, nine Peabody Awards, and over 70 Emmy Awards (18 of which won Emmys for Best Documentary or Series), as well as numerous other awards, Keane has received four Emmy Awards for music, and 20 Emmy nominations. He is the recipient of the New York Festivals TV & Film Awards Grand Award, and was inducted into the New England Music Hall of Fame in 2021.

== Early life ==
Keane was born January 18, 1953, in Philadelphia. His mother, Winifred Keane, was an avant garde composer, and his father George F. Keane was a businessman. Keane had two siblings. Keane grew up in Westport, Connecticut, and played his first professional job as a rock n' roll musician in the sixth grade. He studied privately with the late jazz pianist and Juilliard educator John Mehegan, and then with Czech composer Karel Husa at both Ithaca College, and Cornell where he attended school.

== Professional career ==
=== Guitarist ===
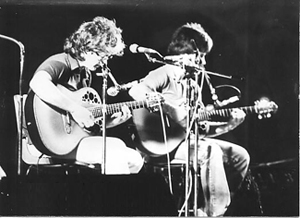
Keane and Larry Coryell in concert 1983

Keane began his professional career as a guitarist playing in clubs and as a sideman, and eventually became a jazz guitarist, touring worldwide and recording for several years in a guitar duo with Larry Coryell, and eventually becoming a Blue Note recording artist.

=== Composer and record producer ===
==== 1980s ====
In the late 1970s, still making his living primarily as a guitarist, Keane met film directors Jim Burroughs and Suzanne Bauman, while working in his childhood friend Gary Scovil's recording studio in Norwalk, Connecticut. In 1981, Keane scored his first documentary for them, Against Wind and Tide: A Cuban Odyssey, which was nominated for an Academy Award for best documentary in 1982. That early success led to several more scoring opportunities for Keane in the 1980s, an era where few documentaries were scored with original music. Keane's prominence as a composer rose quickly, even as he continued to tour as a guitarist in a duo with Larry Coryell, and eventually as a solo artist with the release of his first solo CD Snowfalls in 1986. In 1987, Keane's score to the documentary Suleyman the Magnificent, was discovered by German publisher Eckart Rahn who heard the documentary on television, and decided to release a soundtrack CD of Keane's score on his Celestial Harmonies label. The record, among the first to harmonize traditional Middle Eastern music, would form the first of a series of collaborations with Middle Eastern musician Omer Faruk Tekbilek.

In 1989, Keane scored the music to Chimps: So Like Us, the HBO Academy Award-nominated and Emmy-winning documentary that helped introduce the public to naturalist Jane Goodall.

==== 1990s ====
The early 1990s saw Keane's composing career rise dramatically in stature with the multiple-award-winning General Motors' Playwright's Theatre series for Nederlander television, which ran for four years on A&E, the Emmy- and Columbia Dupont-winning miniseries The Great Depression and The War on Poverty for the prominent film maker Henry Hampton, the highly influential Ric Burns documentary The Donner Party which won a Peabody in 1992, and the Emmy- and Peabody-winning film The Battle of the Bulge, for Oscar-winning director Thomas Lennon.

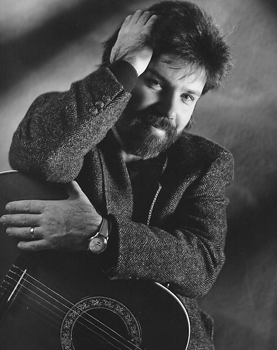
Keane Blue Note Records Press Photo 1992

In 1997, Keane started working with Hollywood agent Bruce Teitell, and scored several feature films including The Vernon Johns Story: Road to Freedom with James Earl Jones; Stephen King's The Night Flier for New Line Cinema, and Illtown for director Nick Gomez. He continued scoring documentaries as well, with the award-winning Burns mini series and Shanachie double CD soundtrack The Way West, Thomas Lennon's Oscar-nominated and Peabody Award-winning The Battle Over Citizen Kane, the award-winning PBS Nova series A Science Odyssey, and more award-winning American Experience documentaries for its new executive producer Margaret Drain. American Experience won Primetime Emmy Awards for Outstanding Non-Fiction Series in both 1998 and 1999. Also in 1999, Brian scored the multiple Emmy-winning Ric Burns series New York: A Documentary Film which, after the World Trade Center attack of September 11, 2001, became among the biggest selling documentary series of its time.

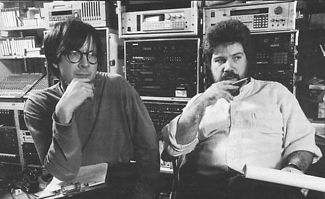
Brian Keane and director Ric Burns working on The Way West 1995

In 1996, Keane was asked to score Spirit of the Games, a documentary on the Olympics by Emmy-winning director George Roy for HBO Sports. It began a long relationship with HBO Sports and a very successful run of sports documentaries including the Peabody-winning films Babe Ruth, Ali Frazier: One Nation Divisible, Dare to Compete and Fists of Freedom, which were part of a new series of documentaries entitled Sports of the 20th Century. Keane also scored HBO's Inside the NFL during that period.

==== 2000s ====
By the year 2000, Napster and other downloading entities were beginning to take over record distribution, and several long established record companies went out of business. In the space of just a year, the record producing business that Keane had enjoyed and accumulated over the previous decade and a half collapsed, along with most record companies. He was still among the most widely recognized composers for documentary film however, and by then, he had extended his notoriety to become a leading composer in the world of sports. In addition to continuing to score Emmy-winning documentaries like Ric Burns' Ansel Adams, Bill Moyers' Becoming American: The Chinese Experience collaborating with Chinese musician George Gao, and several more award-winning American Experience episodes for its new executive producer Mark Samels, Keane composed the music to many classic Emmy- and Peabody-winning HBO sports documentaries in the early 2000s. These included Do You Believe in Miracles, Legendary Nights, Picture Perfect, The Curse of the Bambino and Nine Innings From Ground Zero. He worked with producer Ross Greenburg, directors George Roy, Joe Lavine, and other Emmy-winning sports documentarians, and composed a number of Emmy-nominated and Peabody-winning films for ESPN as well such as Kentucky Bluegrass Basketball, The Complete Angler, You Write Better Than You Play, and David Halberstam's Teammates for directors Fritz Mitchell, Johnson McKelvey, Neil Leifer, and others. Brian also scored several documentary specials for CBS Sports including Pistol Pete, for which he won a music Emmy for his collaborative score with Cajun musician Buckwheat Zydeco.

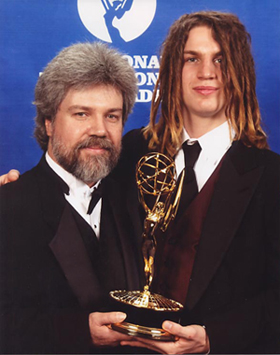
Brian Keane at the 2004 Emmy Awards with his son Dylan

In 2001, Keane became the first, and only composer in the history of the Emmys, to sweep all the Emmy nominations for music composition in a single year, and he won Emmys in 2002, 2003, and 2004 for music composition as well. In 2005, he had three more Emmy nominations for music composition, and scored all five Emmy nominated films for best sports documentary that year, including the best documentary Emmy-winning Rhythm in the Rope for ESPN. In 2006, Keane scored Thomas Lennon and Ruby Yang's The Blood of Yingzhou District, which won an Academy Award for Best Documentary: Short Subject. In addition, he scored the Emmy- and Peabody-winning Ric Burns' films Andy Warhol for American Masters and Eugene O'Neil for American Experience. In 2007, Brian received Emmy nominations for his scores to HBO's Barbaro, Mickey Mantle and Johnson McKelvey's Kabul Girls Club. In addition, Keane's compositions were being used in several major feature films, and being adapted for symphony orchestras throughout the world, including the London Symphony Orchestra, The Istanbul State Symphony Orchestra, The Boston Pops Orchestra, and the Colorado Symphony Orchestra.

Keane enjoyed a nonstop series of successes in the entertainment business for over two decades, but by 2008, the era of reality TV, digital media, and multi channel cable television was coming of age. The high end documentary was falling out of favor due to the expense of making them. A 2007 writer's strike crippled the film and television industry, budgets for live musicians were becoming a thing of the past, and the abundance of new cable channels meant smaller budgets and lower standards. Emmy judging was no longer monitored and, although he continued to score Emmy nominated films like Ric Burns' Into the Deep for American Experience, HBO's Joe Louis: A Hero Betrayed, and The Running Rebels of UNLV, as well as the 2011 Academy Award nominated documentary The Warrior of Quigang, Keane decided to work less.

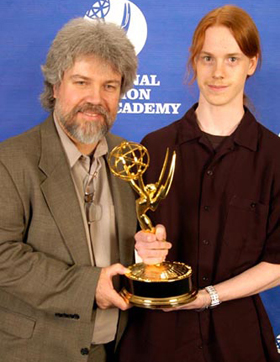
Brian Keane at the 2005 Emmy Awards with his son Wylder

==== 2010s ====
In 2012, after scoring Death and the Civil War, which won the Erik Barnauw Award and received an Emmy nomination for Outstanding Non-Fiction Program, Keane got a call from Oscar-winning director Barry Levinson to score the BBC America television series Copper about an Irish policeman, set in 1864 New York. The Levinson Fontana produced series debuted as the highest rated series in the history of BBC America, and garnered Keane another Primetime Emmy Award nomination for Outstanding Main Title Music. Copper was renewed for a second season in 2013, with the soundtrack, Copper: Original Soundtrack, released via Valley Entertainment.

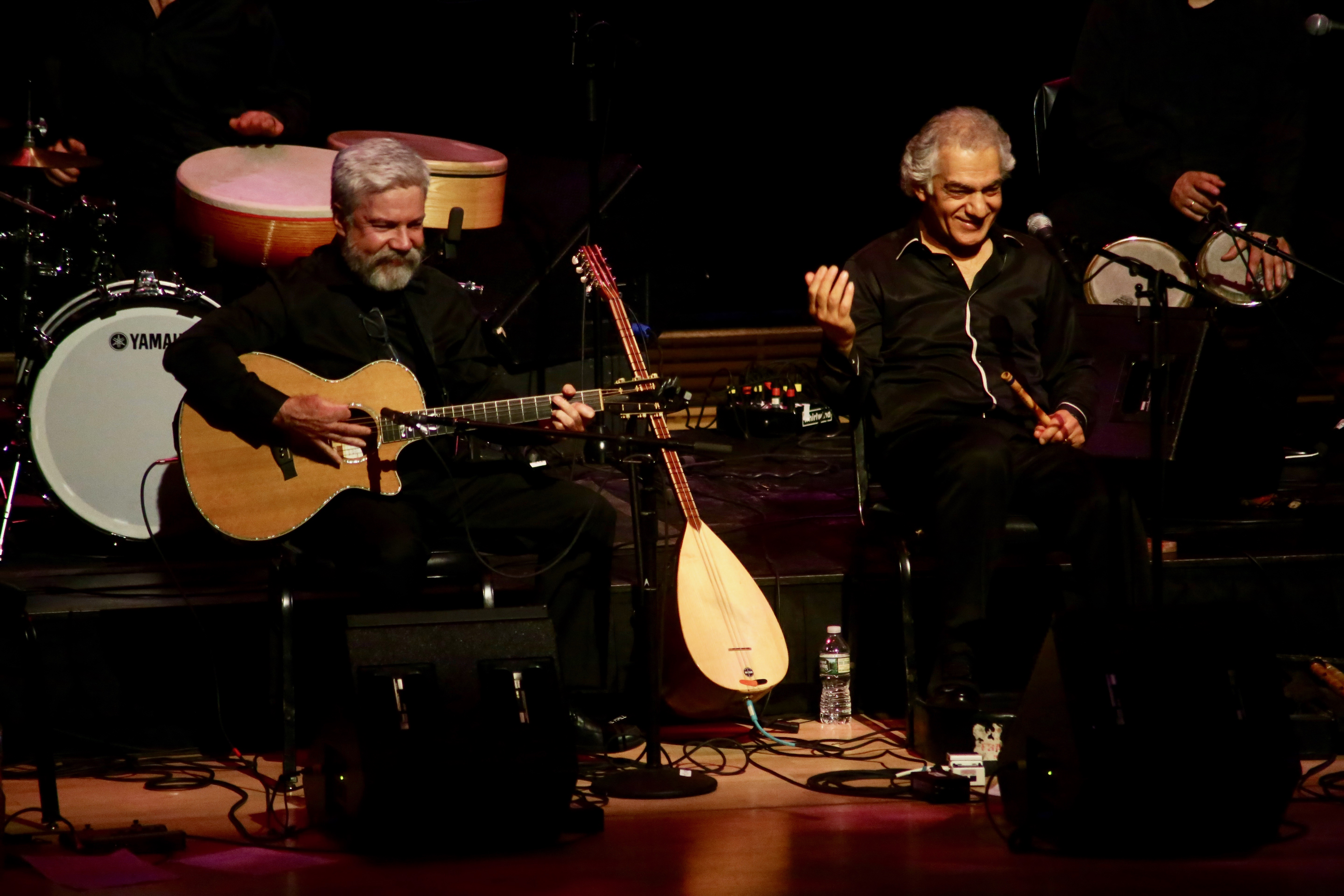
Brian Keane performing with Omar Faruk Tekbilek to a sold-out Carnegie Hall on April 14, 2018

Beginning in 2014, Keane returned to a "semi-retired" schedule. He launched his music library ScoreToPicture.com which was leased to several networks and movie studios. He continued scoring more Emmy award-winning shows for ESPN, including Fritz Mitchell's It's Time, which garnered Keane his 20th Emmy nomination for music, and worked on several other projects including the unusual festival film Enquiring Minds about the history of the National Enquirer, a commission to compose music for the 75th anniversary of the American Ballet Theatre, the joint BBC and PBS special of The Pilgrims, a world music symphony commission resulting in finishing his first symphony A Speck of Time (which was actually mostly written in 1984). He also produced an early music soundtrack to the 1922 Douglas Fairbanks Sr. silent film of Robin Hood, and composed the score to an important film about racism and American history called The Chinese Exclusion Act. In 2018 Keane returned to sports with the 12-hour series Saturdays in the South for ESPN, which won two New York Festival Gold awards. In 2019, he scored a debut feature documentary for the new Disney+ streaming service called One Day At Disney, and Very Ralph, a documentary biopic about Ralph Lauren, which won the New York Festival's Grand Award for its music score. Also in 2019, Brian scored the music to Oliver Sacks: His Own Life, which debuted to sellout crowds at the Telluride and New York Film Festivals in 2019, was the Audience Favorite Award-winner at the Hampton Film Festival and the Sarasota Film Festival, and went on to earn a "100% Fresh" rating on Rotten Tomatoes from both audiences and critics alike.

Keane also returned to performing on guitar occasionally in 2017 following the death of his one time duo partner Larry Coryell, playing numerous tribute concerts at first, and eventually playing a wide variety of concerts, selling out Carnegie Hall in April 2018 with Omar Faruk Tekbilek, and touring internationally again, after almost 35 years, in 2019.

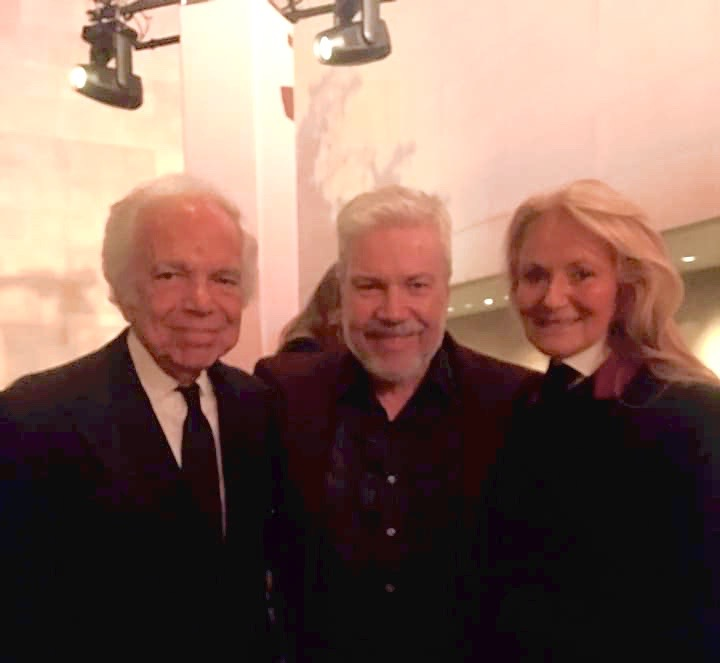
Brian with Ralph and Ricky Lauren at the premier of HBO's Very Ralph

==== 2020s ====
In 2020, Keane helped make a film about his long-time friend and accomplished guitarist Charlie Karp. The documentary features a concert he produced in Charlie's honor, and is called Charlie and Us: The Charlie Karp Story. Keane also scored a critically hailed two-hour PBS special documentary by film maker Gretchen Sorin, working with Ric Burns, called Driving While Black. The film aired about the same time that Oliver Sacks: His Own Life was released, due to the Coronavirus delay, and both soundtracks were released by Valley Entertainment. In 2021, Brian was inducted into the New England Music Hall of Fame. In the same year, he scored a 3-hour documentary, Dante Alighieri and his Divine Comedy, for Italian broadcast, produced by Steeplechase Films, which was updated in 2024 to a 4-hour, two-part film for American broadcast, with a companion double CD soundtrack on Valley Entertainment. In 2022, Brian teamed up with old friend Roger Ball, original founder of the Average White Band, to score a sports documentary called “Yankees/Dogers: An Uncivil War” for Endeavor and ESPN, and in 2023 Brian scored the award-winning theatrical documentary “Here Lived” for director Jane Wells, as well as the seven-part series “Southern Hoops”, a history of SEC basketball, for Fritz Mitchell and ESPN.

Brian eased out of the COVID pause in the summer of 2021 by producing a record for a childhood friend, who had played baseball on a team Brian had managed, and later became the CEO of a Fortune 500 company, George Barrett (older brother of cellist Daniel Barrett, who had played on multiple soundtracks for Brian). The record was called “Not Alone”, and was followed with a second record in 2025 (also with Brian) called “Rearrange Things”. Brian also produced two modern classical records featuring cellist Daniel Barrett in 2021 and 2025, playing music by the French composer Dominique Lemaitre.

In 2023, Brian also returned to an unfinished project from 1993 when he was signed to a deal with Capitol Records as a jazz artist. Brian’s producing and composing career had grown too much to handle simultaneously being a recording and touring artist, and jazz had become very restrictive commercially at that time. Brian decided that he had to get the label to drop him as an artist, and the easiest way to do that was to create sophisticated music. To that end, he invented an ensemble with some of the greatest jazz players at the time: Victor Bailey on bass, a young Rodney Holmes on drums, Randy Brecker on trumpet, saxophonist David Mann, and keyboard player Nick Bariluk. He called the ensemble “The Bebop Headbangers from Outer Space”, and they recorded a couple of tracks for an album to be called “Attack of the Human Brain”. He took the demos to the offices at Capitol Records in New York, kept a straight face, dropped off the music, and got dropped off the label, as he had hoped. 30 years later, although Victor had passed away, Keane was able to reassemble most of the original band with several special guests, and finish the record in 2023.

In 2025, Brian set aside the entire year to record three multi-genre symphonies that had been too ambitious to produce when originally written. These compositions involved full symphony orchestra with ethnic musicians from around the world, electronic music, and a progressive rock ensemble. They included “A Speck In Time”, written in 1984, “Middle Eastern Symphony”, written in 1993, and “Edge of Discovery”, written in 1998. Additionally, “A Speck In Time” became the soundtrack to a movie in celebration of life on Earth. The project involved musicians recorded around the world, some of the top classical, Broadway, and session musicians in the country, thousands of tracks, a team of engineers, and took the entire year to realize. The “Middle Eastern Symphony” reunited Brian with Omar Faruk Tekbilek.

In addition to performing some concerts, Keane continues to work on composing music with his long time engineer Jeff Frez-Albrecht, helping out promising musicians with their music, and occasionally making appearances as a guest lecturer for universities and film festivals. Many of Brian's former employees, interns, and students have gone on to substantial careers of their own.

== Personal life ==
Keane's studio is located in his first home in Monroe, CT which he bought in 1985, and converted into a recording studio in 1993. He married Susan St. Louis in 1987, who had a son, Chris Laskowski, born in 1971. They had their first son, Wylder, in 1987 and a second son, Dylan, in 1988. They lived at first in the studio they called "Little Big Feet Studios", after which the family moved to Newtown in 1994. Keane commuted to the studio from Newtown for 15 years, but moved back to the studio following his divorce in 2010. He has shared his home with actress, theatre producer and former high school classmate Bonnie Housner Erickson since 2015. Although he toured throughout the world in his early career as a guitarist, most of Keane's composing career has taken place at his studio in the woods of Connecticut, near friends that he has known for over sixty years in some cases. In an era where most television and film production took place in New York or Los Angeles, he was able to develop his substantial career simply through the notoriety and emotional power of his music.

== Award-winning / nominated films scored By Brian Keane ==
Award	Description	Title	Status	Year
Academy Award	Best Documentary	Against Wind and Tide: A Cuban Odyssey (PBS)	Nomination	1982
Columbia Dupont Award	Journalism	Against Wind and Tide: A Cuban Odyssey (PBS)	Winner	1982
Golden Hugo Award	Chicago Film Festival	Cuba In the Shadow Of Doubt (PBS)	Winner	1983
Cine Golden Eagle	Best Documentary	Costa Rica: Child in the Wind (PBS)	Winner	1984
First Prize	San Francisco Film Festival	Women of Summer (PBS)	Winner	1985
First Prize	London Film Festival	Suleyman the Magnificent (PBS)	Winner	1986
Golden Athena	Athens Film Festival	Light of the Gods (PBS)	Winner	1987
Cine Golden Eagle	Documentary	Merchants and Masterpieces (PBS)	Winner	1988
Ace Award	-	Pool Hall (A&E)	Nomination	1989
Ace Award	-	27 Wagons Full of Cotton (A&E)	Nomination	1989
Emmy Award	Best Documentary	Chimps: So Like Us (HBO)	Winner	1990
Academy Award	Best Documentary: Short Subject	Chimps: So Like Us (HBO)	Nomination	1990
Ace Award	-	Clara (A&E)	Nomination	1990
Ace Award	-	Last Act is a Solo (A&E)	Winner	1990
Columbia Dupont Award	Best Cultural/Artistic Programming	Coney Island (PBS)	Winner	1991
Ace Award	-	Avenue Z Afternoon (A&E)	Nomination	1991
Erik Barnauw Award	Outstanding Historical Documentary	Coney Island (PBS)	Winner	1992
Ace Award	-	Paralax Gardens (A&E)	Nomination	1992
Peabody Award	-	The Donner Party (PBS)	Winner	1992
Columbia Dupont Award	Best Historical Programming	The Great Depression (PBS)	Winner	1993
Emmy Award	Best Historical Programming	The Great Depression (PBS)	Winner	1993
Emmy Award	Best scientific Programming	National Geographic Explorer (TBS)	Winner	1994
Columbia Dupont Award	Best Historical Programming	America's War On Poverty (PBS)	Winner	1994
Columbia Dupont Award	Best News Documentary Series	Turning Point (ABC)	Winner	1995
Columbia Dupont Award	Best Historical Mini Series	The Way West (PBS)	Winner	1995
Columbia Dupont Award	Best Historical Programming	Battle of the Bulge (PBS)	Winner	1995
Emmy Award	Best Historical Programming	Battle of the Bulge (PBS)	Nomination	1995
Peadbody Award	-	Battle of the Bulge (PBS)	Winner	1995
Columbia Dupont Award	Best Scientific Programming	Buckminster Fuller (PBS)	Winner	1996
Emmy Award	Best Scientific Programming	Buckminster Fuller (PBS)	Nomination	1996
Emmy Award	Best Cultural or Artistic Programming	The Battle Over Citizen Kane (PBS)	Winner	1996
Academy Award	Best Documentary	The Battle Over Citizen Kane (PBS)	Nomination	1996
Columbia Dupont Award	Best Cultural or Artistic Programming	The Battle Over Citizen Kane (PBS)	Winner	1996
Peabody Award	-	The Battle Over Citizen Kane (PBS)	Winner	1996
Columbia Dupont Award	Best Historical Programming	Murder of the Century (PBS)	Winner	1996
Ace Award	-	Spirit of the Games (HBO)	Winner	1996
Columbia Dupont Award	Best Documentary Series	Turning Point (ABC)	Winner	1996
Erik Barnauw Award	Outstanding Historical Documentary	America's War on Poverty (PBS)	Winner	1996
Ace Award	-	Inside The NFL (HBO)	Winner	1997
Columbia Dupont Award	Best Historical Programming	New York Underground (PBS)	Winner	1997
Fangoria Awards	-	Stephen King's Night Flier (New Line)	Winner	1998
Ace Awards	-	Inside The NFL (HBO)	Winner	1998
Emmy Award	Best Historical Programming	Long Journey Home (Disney/PBS)	Nomination	1998
Columbia Dupont Award	Best Scientific Series	A Science Odyssey (PBS)	Winner	1998
Sundance Film Festival	Jury Award	Illtown (Shooting Gallery)	Winner	1998
Emmy Award	Best Music Composition	Babe Ruth (HBO)	Nomination	1998
Peabody Award	-	Babe Ruth (HBO)	Winner	1998
Emmy Award	Outstanding non-fiction series	American Experience (PBS)	Winner	1998
Peabody Award	-	Dare To Compete (HBO)	Winner	1999
Peabody Awards	-	Fists of Freedom (HBO)	Winner	1999
Emmy Award	Outstanding non-fiction series	American Experience (PBS)	Winner	1999
Emmy Award	Best Sports Documentary	Fists of Freedom (HBO)	Winner	1999
Emmy Award	Best Music Composition	Bill Russell (HBO)	Nomination	2000
Emmy Award	Best Sports Documentary	When It Was A Game (HBO)	Winner	2000
Peadbody Award	-	Ali/Frazier (HBO)	Winner	2000
Emmy Award	Best Sports Documentary	Ali/Frazier (HBO)	nomination	2000
Emmy Award	Outstanding Achievement in Non - fiction Programming	New York: A Documentary Film (PBS)	Winner	2000
Emmy Award	Best Documentary	Do You Believe In Miracles? (HBO)	Winner	2001
Emmy Award	Best Music Composition	Do You Believe In Miracles? (HBO)	Nomination	2001
Emmy Award	Best Music Composition	Pistol Pete (CBS)	Winner	2001
Emmy Award	Best Music Composition	Shot Heard 'Round The World (HBO)	Nomination	2001
Columbia Dupont Award	Best Historical Programming	New York: A Documentary Film (PBS)	Winner	2002
Emmy Award	Best Music Composition	Picture Perfect (HBO)	Winner	2002
Emmy Award	Best Sports Documentary	The Bear (CBS)	Nomination	2002
Emmy Award	Outstanding Cultural and Artistic Programming	Ansel Adams (PBS)	Winner	2002
Emmy Award	Best Sports Documentary	Life Behind the Lens (ESPN)	Nomination	2003
Peadbody Award	-	The Complete Angler (ESPN)	Winner	2003
Emmy Award	Best Music Composition	Bluegrass Basketball (ESPN)	Nomination	2003
Emmy Award	Best sports Documentary	Bluegrass Basketball (ESPN)	Nomination	2003
Emmy Award	Best sports Documentary	The Teammates (ESPN)	Nomination	2003
Emmy Award	Best Music Composition	The Teammates (ESPN)	Nomination	2003
Emmy	Best Music and Sound	New York: The Center of the World (PBS)	Nomination	2003
Emmy Award	Best Historical Programming:Long Form	New York: The Center of the World (PBS)	Winner	2003
Emmy Award	Best Music Composition	Jim McKay: My World in My Words (HBO)	Nomination	2003
Emmy Award	Best Edited Sports Series	Legendary Nights (HBO)	Winner	2003
Emmy Award	Best Documentary	Curse of the Bambino (HBO)	Winner	2003
Emmy Award	Best Music Composition	Curse of the Bambino (HBO)	Winner	2003
Emmy Award	Best sports Documentary	Jim McKay: My World in My Words (HBO)	Nomination	2003
Emmy Award	Best Sports Entertainment Program	On the Record (HBO)	Winner	2004
Emmy Award	Best Documentary Mini Series	NYPD 24/7 (ABC)	Nomination	2004
Emmy Award	Best Documentary	Hitler's Pawn (HBO)	Nomination	2004
Emmy Award	Best Music Composition	Hitler's Pawn (HBO)	Nomination	2004
Emmy Award	Best Sports Documentary	Sports Illustrated 50 Years (ESPN)	Nomination	2004
Emmy Award	Best Sports Documentary	Nine Inning From Ground Zero (HBO)	Nomination	2004
Emmy Award	Best Music Composition	Nine Innings From Ground Zero (HBO)	Winner	2004
Emmy Award	Best Non Fiction Mini Series	Becoming American: The Chinese Experience (PBS)	Nomination	2004
Emmy Award	Historical programming: Long Form	Becoming American : Gold Mountain Dreams (PBS)	Nomination	2004
Emmy Award	Historical programming: Long Form	Becoming American : Between Two Worlds (PBS)	Nomination	2004
Emmy Award	Historical programming: Long Form	Becoming American : No Turning Back (PBS)	Nomination	2004
Emmy Award	Best Sports Documentary	Mickey Mantle (HBO)	Nomination	2005
Emmy Award	Best Music Composition	Mickey Mantle (HBO)	Nomination	2005
Emmy Award	Best Sports Documentary	The Perfect Upset (HBO)	Nomination	2005
Emmy Award	Best Sports Documentary	You Write Better Than You Play (ESPN)	Nomination	2005
Emmy Award	Best Music Composition	You Write Better Than You Play (ESPN)	Nomination	2005
Emmy Award	Best Sports Documentary	Dare To Dream (HBO)	Nomination	2005
Emmy Award	Best Sports Documentary	Rhythm in the Rope (ESPN)	Winner	2005
Emmy Award	Best Music Composition	Rhythm in the Rope (ESPN)	Nomination	2005
Academy Award	Best Documentary: Short Subject	Blood of Yingzhou District (HBO)	Winner	2006
Emmy Award	Outstanding Cultural and Artistic Programming	Eugene O'Neill (PBS)	Winner	2006
IDA Award	Best Series	The Supreme Court (PBS)	Winner	2006
Peabody Award	-	Andy Warhol (PBS)	Winner	2006
Emmy Award	Outstanding Cultural and Artistic Programming	Andy Warhol (PBS)	Winner	2006
Cine Golden Eagle	Best Music Composition	America's Lost Landscape: The Tall Grass Prairie (PBS)	Winner	2006
Cine Golden Eagle	Best Documentary	America's Lost Landscape: The Tall Grass Prairie (PBS)	Winner	2006
Emmy Award	Best Music Composition	Barbaro (HBO)	Nomination	2007
Emmy Award	Best Music Composition	Kabul Girls Club (ESPN)	Nomination	2007
Emmy Award	Best Sports Documentary	Wait Till Next Year (HBO)	Nomination	2007
Emmy Award	Best Documentary	Joe Louis: America's Hero Betrayed (HBO)	Nomination	2008
Emmy Award	Best Non Fiction Program	Into the Deep (PBS)	Nomination	2010
Academy Award	Best Documentary - Short Subject	The Warrior of Qiugang (Theatrical)	Nomination	2011
Emmy Award	Best Documentary	Running Rebels Of UNLV	Nomination	2012
Erik Barnauw Award	Outstanding Historical Documentary	Death and the Civil War (PBS)	Winner	2013
Emmy Award	Best Documentary	Death and the Civil War (PBS)	Nomination	2013
Emmy Award	Best Music Composition	Copper - Main Titles (BBC America)	Nomination	2013
Emmy Award	Best Music Composition	It's Time (SEC /ESPN)	Nomination	2015
Emmy Award	Best Sports Documentary	It's Time (SEC /ESPN)	Nomination	2015
Emmy Award	Best Sports Documentary	30 For 30 (ESPN)	Winner	2015
New York Festival Awards	Grand Award - Music	Very Ralph (HBO)	Winner	2020
New York Festival Awards	Gold Award - Music	Very Ralph (HBO)	Winner	2020
New York Festival Awards	Gold Award - Documentary: History & Society	Saturdays In The South (ESPN)	Winner	2020
New York Festival Awards	Gold Award - Sports Documentary	Saturdays In The South (ESPN)	Winner	2020
New England Music Hall of Fame			Inductee	2021
New York Festival Awards	Bronze Award - Music (scored with Roger Ball)	Yankees/Dodgers: An Uncivil War (ESPN)	Winner	2024
New York Festival Awards	Silver Award - Sports Documentary	Yankees/Dodgers: An Uncivil War (ESPN)	Winner	2024
New York Festival Awards	Gold Award - Music	Oliver Sacks: His Own Life (Theatrical)	Winner	2025
New York Festival Awards	Silver Award - Music	Dante: Inferno to Paradise (PBS)	Winner	2025
New York Festival Awards	Silver Award - Music	Here Lived (Theatrical)	Winner	2025
New York Festival Awards	Gold Award - Theatrical Documentary	Here Lived (Theatrical)	Winner	2025

== Emmy Awards (composer) ==
Award Type	Status	Work	Year	Role
Emmy, Best Music Composition	Nominated	Babe Ruth (HBO)	1998	Composer
Emmy, Best Music Composition	Nominated	Bill Russell (HBO)	2000	Composer
Emmy, Best Music Composition	Nominated	Do You Believe In Miracles? (HBO)	2001	Composer
Emmy, Best Music Composition	Winner	Pistol Pete (CBS)	2001	Composer
Emmy, Best Music Composition	Nominated	Shot Heard 'Round The World (HBO)	2001	Composer
Emmy, Best Music Composition	Winner	Picture Perfect (HBO)	2002	Composer
Emmy, Best Music Composition	Nominated	Bluegrass Basketball (ESPN)	2003	Composer
Emmy, Best Music Composition	Nominated	The Teammates (ESPN)	2003	Composer
Emmy, Best Music and Sound	Nominated	New York The Center of the World (PBS)	2003	Composer
Emmy, Best Music Composition	Nominated	Jim McKay: My World in My Words (HBO)	2003	Composer
Emmy, Best Music Composition	Winner	Curse of the Bambino (HBO)	2003	Composer
Emmy, Best Music Composition	Nominated	Hitler's Pawn (HBO)	2004	Composer
Emmy, Best Music Composition	Winner	Nine Innings From Ground Zero (HBO)	2004	Composer
Emmy, Best Music Composition	Nominated	Rhythm in the Rope (ESPN)	2005	Composer
Emmy, Best Music Composition	Nominated	You Write Better Than You Play (ESPN)	2005	Composer
Emmy, Best Music Composition	Nominated	Mickey Mantle (HBO)	2005	Composer
Emmy, Best Music Composition	Nominated	Girl's Club of Kabul (ESPN)	2007	Composer
Emmy, Best Music Composition	Nominated	Barbaro (HBO)	2007	Composer
Emmy, Best Music Composition	Nominated	Copper - Main Titles (BBC America)	2013	Composer
Emmy, Best Music Composition	Nominated	It's Time (SEC /ESPN)	2013	Composer

== Grammy Awards (music producer) ==
Award Type	Status	Work	Year	Role
Grammy Awards, Best Folk or Traditional Album	Nominated	Fire Dance (Celestial Harmonies)	1990	Composer/Producer
Grammy Awards, Best Folk or Traditional Album	Nominated	Beyond The Sky (Celestial Harmonies)	1992	Composer/Producer
Grammy Awards, Best Comedy Album	Nominated	"You're Good Enough..." (BMG /Bantam Audio)	1992	Composer/Producer
Grammy Awards, Best Folk or Traditional Album	Winner	Long Journey Home Soundtrack (RCA)	1998	Composer/Producer

== Soundtrack releases ==
Year	Title	Label	Notes
1987	Suleyman The Magnificent	Celestial Harmonies	Billboard Charting
1992	You're Good Enough...	BMG /Bantam Audio	Grammy Nominee
1995	The Way West	Shanachie	Indie Award
1998	Long Journey Home: The Irish In America	RCA	Grammy Winner, Billboard Charting
1998	Stephen Kings: The Night Flier	RCA	Fangoria Award
1999	New York	RCA	Billboard Charting
2002	Ansel Adams	Green Linnet	Billboard Charting
2005	The War That Made America	Valley Entertainment	
2006	Andy Warhol: A Documentary Film	Valley Entertainment	
2009	Kelebek	Celestial Harmonies	
2011	Into The Deep	Valley Entertainment	
2012	Death And The Civil War	Valley Entertainment	
2013	Copper: Original Soundtrack	Valley Entertainment	
2020	Oliver Sacks: His Own Life	Valley Entertainment	
2020	Driving While Black: Original Soundtrack	Valley Entertainment	
2024	Dante: Inferno to Paradise	Valley Entertainment	

== Select discography (music producer) ==
Year	Title	Record label	Notes	Artists
1982	At The Airport	WEA	-	Larry Coryell, Brian Keane
1983	Just Like Being Born	Flying Fish	-	Larry Coryell, Brian Keane
1986	Snowfalls	Flying Fish	Billboard Top 20 New Age Charts	Brian Keane
1988	Boléro	Evidence	-	Larry Coryell, Brian Keane
1989	Tibetan Bells 3: The Empty Mirror	Celestial Harmonies	Top 20 Billboard New Age Charts	Henry Wolff, Nancy Hennings
1990	Fire Dance	Celestial Harmonies	Grammy Nominated, Top 20 Billboard New Age Charts	Brian Keane, Omar Faruk Tekbilek
1991	Yamantaka	Celestial Harmonies	-	Mickey Hart, Henry Wolff, Nancy Hennings
1991	Nelson Rangell	GRP	Billboard Top 20 Contemporary Jazz Charts	Nelson Rangell
1992	Mariachi Cobre	Celestial Harmonies	Top 20 Billboard World Charts	Mariachi Cobre
1992	Beyond The Sky	Celestial Harmonies	Grammy Nominated, Echoes "Record Of The Year", Top 20 Billboard New Age Charts	Brian Keane, Omar Faruk Tekbilek
1992	Common Planet	Blue Note	Billboard Top 20 Contemporary Jazz Charts	Brian Keane
1992	Festival Of The Heart	Hearts of Space Records	Billboard Top 20 New Age Charts	John Boswell
1993	Count Me In	Hearts of Space Records	Billboard Top 20 New Age Charts	John Boswell
1993	Khenany	Celestial Harmonies	-	Khenany
1994	Whirling	Celestial Harmonies	Top 20 Billboard New Age Charts	Omar Faruk Tekbilek
1994	Celtic Twilight	Hearts of Space Records	Billboard's "New Age Album Of The Year", #1 Billboard New Age Charts	Various
1995	VIa Jo	Triloka/Polygram	#1 On World Music Charts In Europe	Vieux Diop
1995	Este Es Mi Mariachi	Celestial Harmonies /Kuckuck	Top 20 Billboard World Charts	Linda Ronstadt, Mariachi Cobre
1995	Song Of The Irish Whistle	Hearts O' Space	Billboard Top 10 New Age Charts	Joanie Madden
1995	Celtic Twilight 2	Hearts O' Space	Billboard Top 10 New Age Charts	Nightnoise, Bill Douglas, John Doan, Alasdair Fraser & Paul Machlis, Kevin Braheny & Tim Clark, Steve McDonald, Mychael Danna, Joanie Madden, Loreena McKennitt, Talitha MacKenzie
1996	Closer To Far Away	Windham Hill	Billboard Top 20 New Age Charts	Douglass Spotted Eagle
1996	Mystical Garden	Celestial Harmonies	Top 20 Billboard World Charts	Omar Faruk Tekbilek
1996	Carols Of Christmas	Windham Hill/BMG	Billboard #1 On New Age Charts	George Winston, Michael Hedges, Steve Morse, David Darling, Ray Lynch, Richard Stoltzman, Marion Meadows, Jim Brickman, Manuel Barrueco
1997	Summer Solstice	Windham Hill/BMG	Billboard Top 10 New Age Charts For 4 Months	George Winston, Michael Hedges, William Ackerman, Liz Story, Keola Beamer, Sean Harkness
1997	Celtic Twilight 4: Celtic Planet	Hearts O' Space	Billboard Top 10 New Age Charts	Davy Spillane, Bill Douglas, Carlos Núñez, John Doan, Mychael Danna, Joanie Madden, Anúna, Aoife Ní Fhearraigh
1997	Winters Solstice VI	Windham Hill/BMG	Billboard #1 New Age Charts	George Winston, Michael Hedges
1997	Crescent Moon	Celestial Harmonies	-	Omar Faruk Tekbilek
1997	Conversations with God	Windham Hill	Billboard #1 New Age Charts	Ray Lynch, Gabrielle Roth and The Mirror, Jim Brickman, David Arkenstone, Yanni, Shadowfax, Patrick O'Hearn, Mark Isham
1998	Long Journey Home	Unisphere/RCA Victor/BMG	Grammy Award Winner: Best Folk / Traditional Album. Billboard Top 10 World Music Charts	Various, The Chieftains, Van Morrison, Elvis Costello, Sinéad O'Connor, Mary Black, Sissel Kyrkjebø, Vince Gill,
1998	Threads of Time	RCA	Top 20 Billboard World Charts	Cherish the Ladies
1998	The Renaissance Album	Windham Hill/BMG	-	Various, Nancy Wilson, Ann Wilson, The Baltimore Consort, Angels of Venice, John Doan
1998	Summer Solstice 2	Windham Hill/BMG	Billboard Top 10 New Age Charts	Buckwheat Zydeco, Taj Mahal, Ladysmith Black Mambazo, Tuck & Patti, Earl Klugh, W.G. Snuffy Walden,
1998	Thanksgiving	Windham Hill/BMG	Billboard Top 10 New Age Charts	Paul Winter, George Winston, Carlos Nakai, Paul McCandless, Michael Manring, Philip Aaberg, John Sebastian
1998	Song Of The Irish Whistle 2	Hearts O' Space	Billboard Top 10 New Age Charts	Joanie Madden
1998	Sanctuary	Windham Hill	Billboard Top 10 New Age Charts	Jim Brickman, William Ackerman, Tracy Silverman, Michael Hedges, Michael Manring, Liz Story, Alex De Grassi, William Edward Childs, Douglas Spotted Eagle, Metamora
1999	Here There Everywhere	Windham Hill	Billboard Top 10 New Age Charts	W. G. Snuffy Walden, Tuck & Patti, Wayne Johnson, Liz Story, Michael Hedges, George Winston, Doyle Dykes, Angels of Venice
1999	Winter Solstice On Ice	Windham Hill	Billboard #1 New Age Charts	W. G. Snuffy Walden, Peabo Bryson, Mark Snow, Jim Brickman, George Winston, Janis Ian, Michael Hedges, Roberta Flack, Jeffrey Osborne, The Rippingtons, Yani, Mark Isham
1999	Song Of The Hills	Shanachie	-	John Sebastian, Bill Keith, Jay Ungar, Eric Weissberg, Norman Blake, Tony Trischka
1999	Crossing The Bridge	Sony	Billboard Top 10 On The World Music Charts	Eileen Ivers, Al Di Meola, Steve Gadd, Randy Brecker, Bakithi Kumalo, Séamus Egan,
1999	Sundance Summer Solstice	Windham Hill/BMG	Billboard Top 10 New Age Charts	George Winston, Will Ackerman, Jim Brickman, Jay Beckenstein, Angels of Venice, Phil Aaeberg, Paul McCandless, Michael Nanring, David Arkenstone
1999	Celtic Twilight 5	Hearts O' Space	Billboard Top 10 New Age Charts	Méav Ní Mhaolchatha, Bill Douglas, Jeff Danna, John Doan, Mychael Danna, Joanie Madden, Jeff Johnson
1999	At Home	RCA	Billboard Top 10 World Charts	Cherish The Ladies
2000	Afrika Wassa	Sony/Triloka	Top 20 Billboard World Charts	Vieux Diop
2000	The Girls Won't Leave The Boys Alone	RCA	Top 20 Billboard World Charts	Cherish the Ladies, Pete Seeger, Liam Clancy, Arlo Guthrie
2020	De l’espace trouser la fin et le milieu	New Focus		Dan Barrett plays Dominique Lemaitre
2023	Not Alone	Favorite Dog		George Barrett
2024	Johann Sebastian Bach Musikalisches Offer BWV 1079	Celestial Harmonies		Brian Keane, Emily Wong
2025	Rearrange Things	Favorite Dog		George Barrett
2025	A Speck In Time	Valley Entertainment		Brian Keane, Omar Faruk Tekbilek, Joanie Madden, George Gao, Emily Wong, Rodney Holmes, Jamey Haddad, and many others
2026	La cetoine qui dort dans le coeur de la rose	New Focus		Dan Barrett plays Dominique Lemaitre
