= My Voice, My Life =

2014 Hong Kong documentary by Ruby Yang

- Film poster
- 《爭氣》／《争气》
- Directed by: Ruby Yang
- Produced by: Ruby Yang; Ada Ho
- Cinematography: Siu Ki Yip
- Edited by: Man Cheung Ma
- Music by: Brian Keane; Robert Ellis-Geiger
- Release date: October 2014
- Running time: 91 minutes
- Country: Hong Kong
- Language: Cantonese

My Voice, My Life 《爭氣》 is a feature-length documentary film directed by Ruby Yang. It tells the poignant stories of a group of under-privileged Hong Kong youngsters who underwent six months of vigorous trainings to produce a musical on stage. Through their trials and tribulations, the students challenge parents, teachers and policy makers to reflect on our way of nurturing the next generation.

The film is presented by the L plus H Creations Foundation, in association with the Lee Hysan Foundation.

Ruby Yang's other works have mainly focused on social issues in mainland China, such as The Blood of Yingzhou District, which won the 2006 Academy Award for Best Documentary Short Subject and The Warriors of Qiugang, which was nominated Academy Award for Best Documentary Short Subject in 2011.

My Voice, My Life opened in 13 theaters in Hong Kong and Macau. Wall Street Journal named it "Hong Kong’s five most-notable films of 2014." It won the 2015 NPT Human Spirit Award at the Nashville Film Festival. It was selected by film critics societies from Hong Kong, Taiwan and mainland China as "one of the ten best Chinese-language films of 2014."

== Plot summary ==
"My Voice, My Life" follows an unlikely group of misfit students from four Hong Kong schools cast together for a musical theater performance. From low self- esteem to blindness, each student confronts unique personal challenges in the process of developing his or her character. Teachers and administrators question whether this ragtag band will be able to work together, much less put on a successful show.

Many of the musical theater troupe's students come from Hong Kong's least-desirable, "Band 3" secondary schools, which admit the territory's academically under-performing students. Others come from a school for the blind that seeks to teach its students how to perform basic tasks and function in the sighted world. Brought together to sing, dance, and act, the students question their own abilities and balk at the spotlight.
