= Steeplechase Films =

- Industry: documentary films
- Founded: 1989
- Headquarters: New York, NY
- Key people: Ric Burns
- Website: www.ricburns.com

Steeplechase Films is a documentary production company founded in 1989 by filmmaker Ric Burns. They produce films focusing on events and people in American history, mainly for the PBS series American Experience. Ric and his company are best known for the eight-part, seventeen-and-a-half-hour series, New York: A Documentary Film, which premiered nationally on PBS to wide public and critical acclaim when broadcast in three installments in November 1999, September 2001, and September 2003.

== Filmography ==
- Coney Island (1991)
- The Donner Party (1992)
- The Way West (1995)
- Ansel Adams: A Documentary Film (2002)
- New York: A Documentary Film (1999)
- New York: A Documentary Film—The Center of the World (2003)
- Eugene O'Neill: A Documentary Film (2006)
- Andy Warhol: A Documentary Film (2006)
- Into the Deep: America, Whaling & the World (2010)
- Death and the Civil War (2012)
- Enquiring Minds: The Untold Story of the Man Behind the National Enquirer (2014)
- American Ballet Theatre: A History (2015)
- The Pilgrims (2015)
- Debt of Honor: Disabled Veterans in American History (2015)
- VA: the Human Cost of War (2017)
- The Chinese Exclusion Act (2018)
- Made for Each Other: A History of the Bond Between Humans and Dogs (2019)
- Oliver Sacks: His Own Life (2019)
- Dante: Inferno to Paradise (2024)

== List of awards and nominations ==
- 31st News & Documentary Emmy Awards (2010) - Outstanding Nonfiction Series (nominated) for Into the Deep: America, Whaling & The World
- 27th News & Documentary Emmy Awards (2006) - Outstanding Writing for Nonfiction Programming (won) for Andy Warhol: A Documentary Film
- 27th News & Documentary Emmy Awards (2006) - Outstanding Nonfiction Series (nominated) for Andy Warhol: A Documentary Film under the American Masters series.
- 27th News & Documentary Emmy Awards (2006) - Outstanding Individual Achievement in a Craft: Writing (won) for Eugene O'Neill
- Peabody Award (2006) - (won) for Andy Warhol: A Documentary Film
