= Ansel Adams: A Documentary Film =

2002 documentary film by Ric Burns

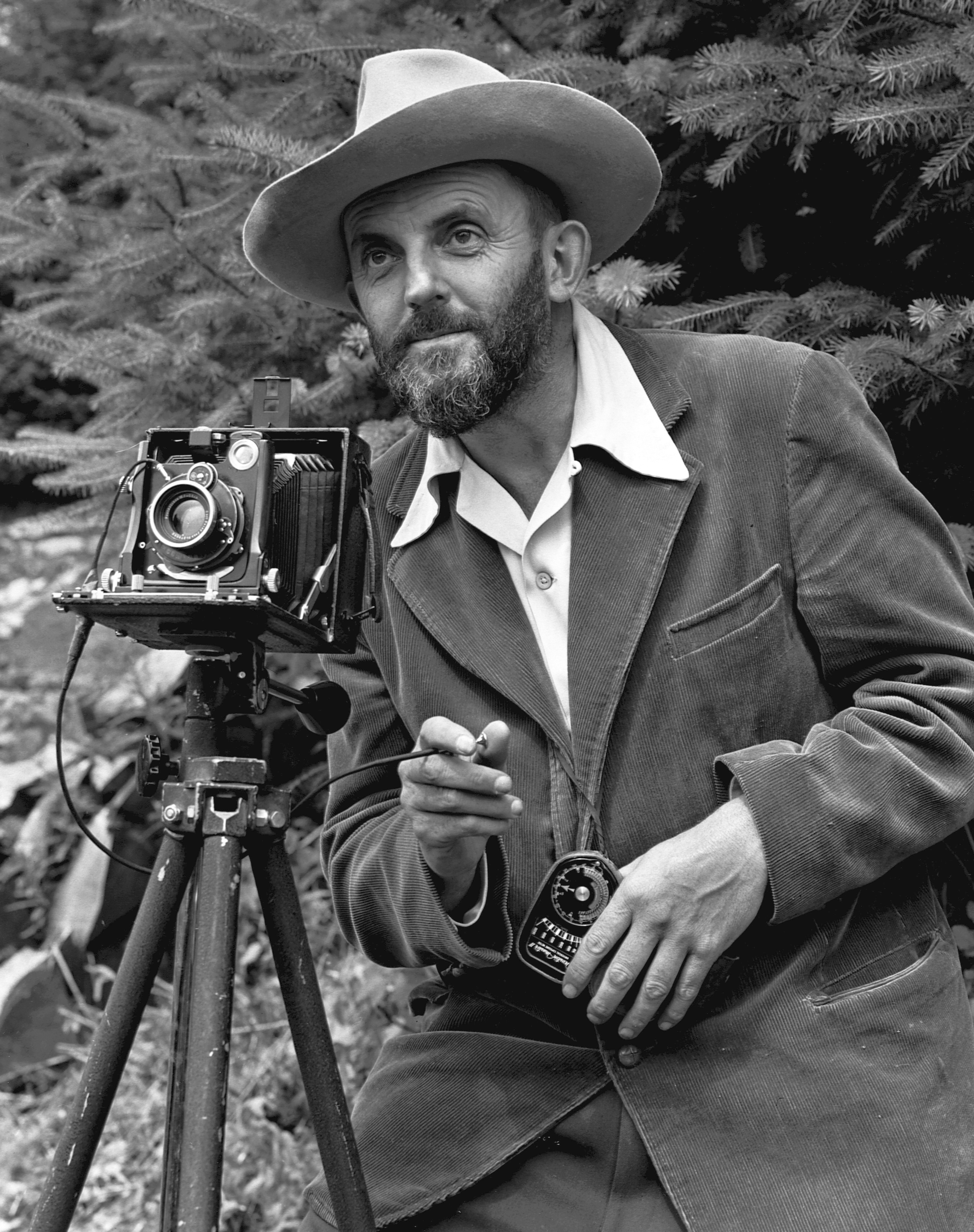
- Adams in the 1950 Yosemite Field School yearbook
- Directed by: Ric Burns
- Written by: Ric Burns
- Produced by: Marilyn Ness; Ric Burns
- Cinematography: Buddy Squires; Michael Chin; Jon Else
- Edited by: Li-Shin Yu
- Music by: Brian Keane
- Production companies: Steeplechase Films; Sierra Club Productions
- Distributed by: PBS
- Release date: 2002
- Running time: 100 minutes
- Language: English

Ansel Adams: A Documentary Film is a 2002 documentary and biographical film that traces the life of the American photographer Ansel Adams. He is most noted for his landscape images of the American West. The film is narrated by David Ogden Stiers and features the voices of Josh Hamilton, Barbara Feldon, and Eli Wallach. It was broadcast on PBS as part of the series American Experience.

== Production ==
The film features images of Adams' work, readings of his writing, archival footage and original footage of the landscapes that inspired him. Interview subjects included Michael Adams and Anne Adams Helms (Ansel Adams's son and daughter), Mary Street Alinder, Carl Pope, Alex Ross, John Sexton, Jonathan Spaulding, Andrea Gray Stillman, William A. Turnage and John Szarkowski.

Director Ric Burns shot portions of the film in the same landscapes that were the settings for Adams' most iconic images. Said Burns, "to get to the heart of what so inspired Ansel Adams, we literally followed in his footsteps. We lugged our cameras up sheer rock faces and hiked the winding trails that led Ansel to his photographic revelations. And they led us to Ansel."

== Critical reception ==
Laura Fries of Variety wrote: “Burns creates a visually mesmerizing retrospective of Adams’s career...the film examines the inspirations and intentions of the artist who transcended the medium to become an American folk hero.”

== Awards ==
The Alfred I. duPont-Columbia Silver Baton Award 2001-2002
Emmy Award for Outstanding Cultural and Artistic Programming 2002
