= Ritoma =

2018 Hong Kong documentary by Ruby Yang

- Theatrical release poster
- Directed by: Ruby Yang
- Produced by: Ruby Yang
- Cinematography: Mike Mak Hoi Ki Law
- Edited by: Ruby Yang
- Music by: Brian Keane
- Release date: 8 April 2018
- Running time: 57 minutes
- Country: Hong Kong
- Languages: English; Tibetan

Ritoma (traditional Chinese:仁多瑪; Simplified Chinese:仁多玛) is a documentary film directed, edited and produced by Oscar-winning filmmaker Ruby Yang. It features Tibetan nomads who are passionate about basketball. This film mainly explores how Tibetans preserve their disappearing nomadic culture whilst cope with new challenges through basketball. Alongside with poverty issue and modernization.

== Synopsis ==
For thousands of years, Tibetans have been practicing nomadic pastoralism on the Tibetan plateau, in Gansu Province, China. Until recently, climate change and more children attending school has made this long-established practice impossible to continue. Meanwhile, Tibetans have a deep-rooted love for basketball. But they have no strategy nor proper training for them to win tournaments. Now, having a former college basketball player as their coach enables their passion for basketball to blossom.

The film begins with Jampa, a poet, reciting a romantic poem on the Tibetan green pasture. Using him as a lead, the film follows the Norlha basketball team from Ritoma. Players of this team come from diverse backgrounds, from dyer to former monk, but they all share the same commitment towards basketball. The basketball team was given proper training by Norlha workshop founded by social entrepreneurs, Dechen Yeshi and her mother Kim Yeshi. Besides, they opened a textile workshop that gave young Tibetan women the opportunity to earn income and break through the social stigma that women are homemakers and child-bearers. With people in the community being more open-minded, women are able to play basketball without judgment. Although modernization could alleviate poverty and relieve the effects of climate change, is it worth sacrificing their original culture. This question is left for the audience to ponder.
