= The Chinese Exclusion Act (film) =

2018 television documentary film

- Directed by: Ric Burns; Li-Shin Yu
- Written by: Ric Burns
- Produced by: Li-Shin Yu; Robin Espinola; Ric Burns
- Narrated by: Hoon Lee
- Cinematography: Michael Chin; Buddy Squires; Brian Heller; Anthony Savini; Jon Else; Lincoln Else; Allen Moore
- Edited by: Li-Shin Yu
- Music by: Brian Keane
- Production companies: Steeplechase Films; Center for Asian American Media
- Distributed by: Public Broadcasting Service
- Release dates: March 19, 2017 (CAAMFest); May 29, 2018
- Running time: 162 minutes
- Country: United States
- Language: English

The Chinese Exclusion Act is a 2017 documentary film about the United States Chinese Exclusion Act of 1882. Produced by PBS as a "special presentation" for the American Experience documentary program, it explores how the Act's 61-year-long prohibition of Chinese immigrants to the United States had an effect on Chinese communities already living in the country. Directed by Ric Burns and Li-Shin Yu, who also served as writer and editor respectively, the film premiered in the 2017 CAAMFest and aired on PBS in the United States on May 29, 2018.

== Interviewees ==
- Martin B. Gold, attorney
- Erika Lee, historian
- David Lei, community advocate
- Mary Ting Yi Lui, historian
- Mae Ngai, historian
- Jean Pfaelzer, historian
- Kevin Starr, historian
- John Kuo Wei Tchen, historian
- Ling-chi Wang, scholar
- K. Scott Wong, historian
- Renqiu Yu, historian

== Production ==
The documentary began production in 2012.

== Critical response ==
Mike Hale of The New York Times commended The Chinese Exclusion Act for its timeliness and stated that it serves as "a cautionary tale" about the history of immigration in the United States, and that "throughout the film, the contemporary parallels smack you in the face." Hanh Nguyen of IndieWire called the work a "damning look at how the American government fostered racism," calling it "essential viewing for context on today’s immigration debate." Nguyen says, "The horrific accounts the documentary details are compounded by the fact that this entire chapter of history isn’t as widely familiar as it should be."

== Home media ==
The Chinese Exclusion Act was released on DVD by PBS on June 19, 2018.
