= Dante: Inferno to Paradise =

- Written by: Ric Burns; Riccardo Bruscagli
- Directed by: Ric Burns
- Music by: Brian Keane
- Country of origin: United States
- Original language: English
- No. of episodes: 2

Production
- Executive producers: Jane Morrow; Regina K. Scully; Geralyn White Dreyfous; Jeff Bieber
- Producers: Leigh Howell; Bonnie Lafave
- Cinematography: Buddy Squires; Tim Cragg
- Editors: Omry Maoz; Margaret Metzger; Li-Shin Yu; Parker Dixon; Tom Patterson; Kent Bassett; Brandon Holmes
- Production company: Steeplechase Films

Original release
- Network: PBS
- Release: March 18 – March 19, 2024

Dante: Inferno to Paradise is a 2024 American two-part documentary directed by Ric Burns, following the life and career of Dante Alighieri, and his poem Divine Comedy. It was broadcast by PBS on March 18 and 19, 2024.

== Premise ==
Explores the life and career of Dante Alighieri and his poem Divine Comedy. Interviews include Riccardo Bruscagli, Teodolinda Barolini, Lino Pertile, Elena Lombardi, Heather Webb, Catherine Adoyo, Claudio Giunta, Theodore Cachey, Manuele Gragnolati, Giuseppe Ledda, Timothy Verdon and Guy Raff.

== Episodes ==
No.	Title	Directed by	Original release date
1	"Episode One"	Ric Burns	March 18, 2024
Dante has escaped his home city of Florence. In 1306, as a 41-year-old exile at a castle in Lunigiana, he begins the work that would take the remainder of his life to finish. Brunetto Latini was Dante's teacher. In the spring of 1302, Dante is condemned to death in absentia.
2	"Episode Two"	Ric Burns	March 19, 2024
The exiled Dante supports Henry VII, Holy Roman Emperor who is laying siege against Florence. In paradise, Dante meets his Crusader ancestor Cacciaguida. Guido Novello pays homage to Dante when he passes away in Ravenna. Thereafter, Giovanni Boccaccio promotes Dante's work. The Florentine dialect and the language in which Dante writes the Divine Comedy replaces the Latin language. Henry Longfellow translates Dante's Divine Comedy from Italian into English, while Ralph Waldo Emerson translates the Vita Nuova.

== Production ==
In April 2021, it was announced Ric Burns was in production on a documentary revolving around Dante Alighieri.

== Reception ==
Stephen Smith of The Wall Street Journal gave the film a positive review writing: "Beautifully executed and collaborative in spirit."
