= Snowfalls (album) =

Studio album by Brian Keane
- Released: 1986
- Genre: Jazz
- Label: Flying Fish

Snowfalls is the 1986 debut solo guitar album of American film composer Brian Keane. The album contains solo guitar compositions many of which touch on the winter holiday season.

== Track listing ==
1. A Child Is Born - 7:40
2. Ruby C. - 4:11
3. River Boat - 3:54
4. Snowfalls - 9:18
5. Country Morning/Cast Your Fate To The Wind - 10:11
6. Stillpond Creek - 3:30
7. Girls In The Neighborhood - 3:04
8. Going For Baroque - 2:36
9. Some Other Time - 6:35
