= Ric Burns =

American filmmaker

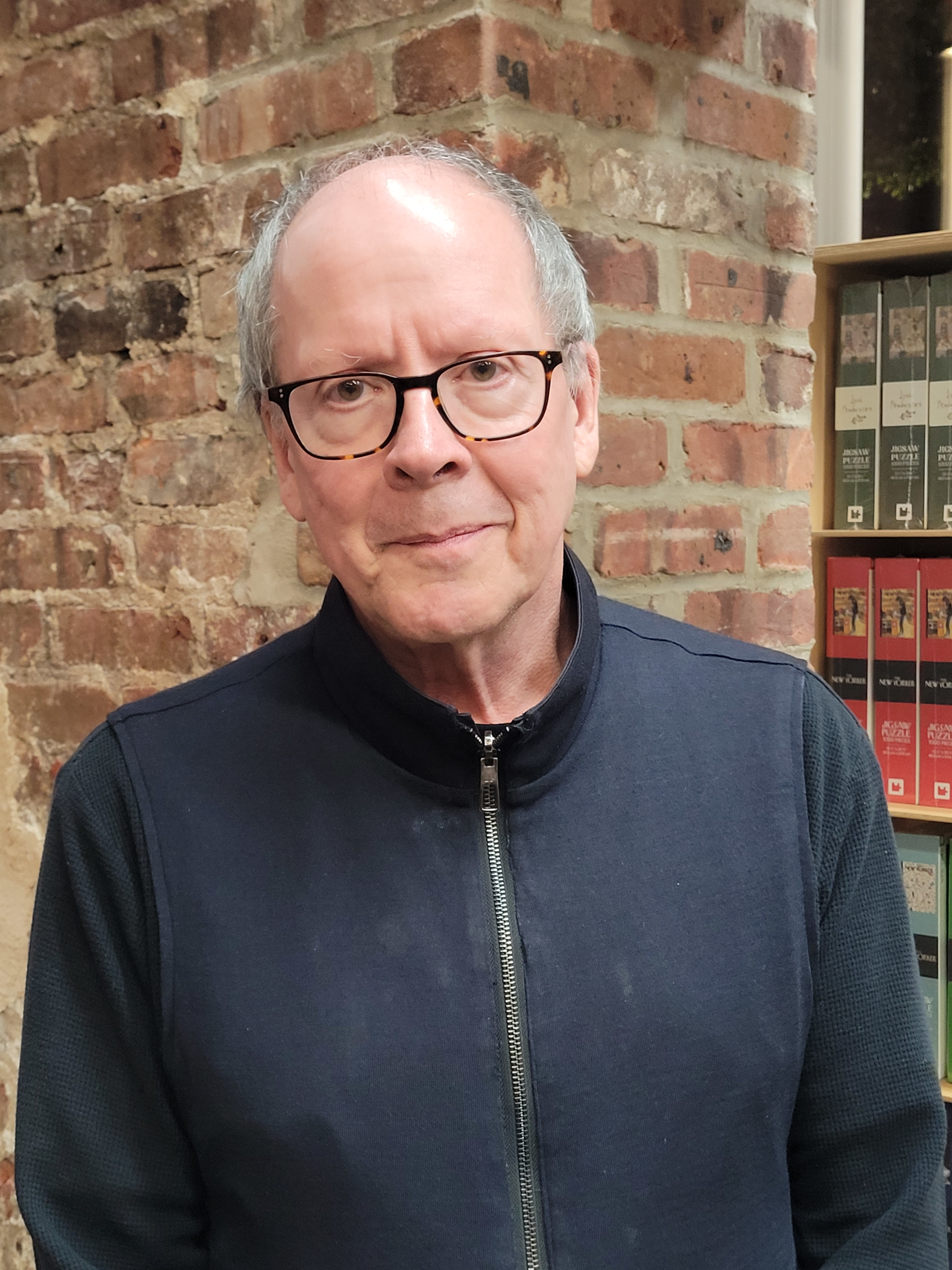
- Ric Burns (2025)
- Born: Eric Burns; 1955 (age 70–71); Baltimore, Maryland, U.S.
- Education: Columbia University (BA); University of Cambridge
- Occupations: Filmmaker; writer
- Relatives: Ken Burns (brother), Sarah Burns (niece), Lilly Burns (niece)

Ric Burns (Eric Burns, born 1955) is an American documentary filmmaker and writer. He has written, directed and produced historical documentaries since the 1990s, beginning with his collaboration on the celebrated PBS series The Civil War (1990), which he produced with his older brother Ken Burns and wrote with Geoffrey Ward.

== Biography ==
Born in Baltimore, Maryland, Burns moved to Ann Arbor, Michigan, at an early age and later attended Columbia University and Cambridge University, breaking from his graduate work to join his brother on the production of the Civil War series. Since founding Steeplechase Films in 1989, he has directed several programs for WGBH Boston's American Experience, including Coney Island (1991). Burns also wrote and directed The Donner Party (1992).

In 1995, Burns wrote, directed, and co-produced The Way West. In April 2002, he completed a documentary about Ansel Adams, a co-production of Steeplechase Films and Sierra Club Productions for American Experience. Since 2018, he has served as a trustee of the National Humanities Center in Research Triangle Park, NC.

=== New York: A Documentary Film ===
Burns is probably best known for his series New York: A Documentary Film, which premiered nationally on PBS. The ten-part, twenty-one and-a-half-hour film chronicles the city's rise from a tiny Dutch trading post through its continuing preeminence as an economic and cultural capital of the world.

The first five episodes of New York were broadcast in November 1999; the sixth and seventh episodes in the fall of 2001; and the eighth episode in September 2003. The ninth and tenth episodes were released in September 2026, chronicling New York since the events of September 11, 2001.

=== More recent films ===
The Pilgrims (2015) has drawn renewed interest since Netflix featured it in late 2020 and PBS rebroadcast it on November 19, 2020, as a part of the American Experience series.

Mixing documentary with live acting, the film explores the history, politics, and personalities of the Pilgrims, from their exile in Holland through their subsequent voyage to, and lives in, the New World. While it touches on the universally accepted narrative—the romanticized, whitewashed, and fictionalized version—it reveals many details that would likely be unfamiliar, even shocking, to general audiences.

Burns's recently completed projects include The Chinese Exclusion Act (2018), a deeply American story of immigration and national identity, civil rights, and human justice—about how we define who can be an American and what being an American means. The film examines the economic, cultural, social, legal, racial, and political dimensions of the law; the forces and events that gave rise to it; and the effect it has had, and continues to have, on American culture and identity.

Oliver Sacks: His Own Life (2019) explores the life and work of Oliver Sacks, a polymath and historian of the 20th century. The film uses footage shot in the months before he died. It includes 80 hours of footage with Sacks and his partner, Billy Hayes. The picture exhibits shared moments with friends, colleagues, and family members while Sacks ponders the meaning of his life in relation to his impending death.

== Selected filmography ==
- Coney Island (1991)
- The Donner Party (1992) on the Donner Party
- The Way West (1995)
- New York: A Documentary Film (1999; expanded 2003)
- Ansel Adams: A Documentary Film (2002)
- Columbia: A Celebration (2003)
- Eugene O'Neill: A Documentary Film (2006)
- Andy Warhol: A Documentary Film (2006)
- We Shall Remain (2009), on Native Americans
- Into the Deep: America, Whaling & the World (2010)
- Nantucket (2011)
- Death and the Civil War (2012)
- Enquiring Minds: The Untold Story of the Man Behind the National Enquirer (2014)
- American Ballet Theatre: A History (2015)
- Debt of Honor: Disabled Veterans in American History (2015)
- The Pilgrims (2015)
- VA: The Human Cost of War (2017)
- The Chinese Exclusion Act (2018)
- Oliver Sacks: His Own Life (2019)
- Driving While Black: Race, Space and Mobility in America (2020)
- Dante: Inferno to Paradise (2024)

== Bibliography ==
- The companion book to the Civil War series (with Geoffrey C. Ward and Ken Burns)
- New York: An Illustrated History (with James Sanders and Lisa Ades)

== Selected list of awards and nominations ==
- 31st News & Documentary Emmy Awards (2010) - Outstanding Nonfiction Series (nominated) for Into the Deep: America, Whaling & The World
- 27th News & Documentary Emmy Awards (2006) - Outstanding Writing for Nonfiction Programming (won) for Andy Warhol: A Documentary Film
- 27th News & Documentary Emmy Awards (2006) - Outstanding Nonfiction Series (nominated) for Andy Warhol: A Documentary Film under the American Masters series.
- 27th News & Documentary Emmy Awards (2006) - Outstanding Individual Achievement in a Craft: Writing (won) for Eugene O'Neill
- Peabody Award (2006) - (won) for Andy Warhol: A Documentary Film
