= The Donner Party (1992 film) =

1992 film by Ric Burns

- Directed by: Ric Burns
- Written by: Ric Burns
- Produced by: Lisa Ades; Ric Burns
- Cinematography: Buddy Squires; Allen Moore
- Edited by: Bruce Shaw
- Music by: Brian Keane
- Distributed by: Steeplechase Films
- Release date: 1992
- Running time: 90 minutes
- Country: United States
- Language: English

The Donner Party is a 1992 documentary film that traces the history of the Donner Party, an ill-fated pioneer group that trekked from Springfield, Illinois to Sutter's Fort, California - a disastrous journey of 2500 miles made famous by the tales of cannibalism the survivors told upon reaching their destination. The film, narrated by David McCullough, premiered at the Telluride Mountainfilm Festival in May 1992 with an introductory lecture on the Donner Party by noted Western historian David Lavender. It subsequently aired on PBS as part of the American Experience program in October, 1992. It was funded in part by the National Endowment for the Humanities.

The film was produced using a combination of archival materials, including letters, photographs, paintings, and diaries from members of the Donner Party, as well as new footage shot of the trail the Party journeyed along in Oregon and California. Animated maps are used to show the route the Donner Party took. On-camera experts include Harold Schindler, Joseph King, Donald Buck, and Wallace Stegner. Timothy Hutton, Amy Madigan, Frances Sternhagen, George Plimpton, Lois Smith, and Eli Wallach perform the letters and diaries written by the Donner Party before, during, and after their journey.

== Synopsis ==
In 1846, a large wagon train left Springfield, Illinois, for California. In July of that year, following the advice of The Emigrants' Guide to Oregon and California written by a pro-emigration promoter named Lansford Hastings, the Donner party left the main body of emigrants to take a never before tried "shortcut" across the Great Basin.

The Donner Party arrived at the foot of the Sierra Nevada, the last mountain pass before California, weeks behind schedule and short of food. The first blizzard of the season started only one day before they planned to head up and over the Sierra Nevada. With 95% of their journey already completed, they would be forced to wait months to make the final push, enduring the most unfavorable Sierra Nevada winter in history. The group was trapped on the eastern side of the Sierra for five months, culminating in death and cannibalism. Of the 87 men, women, and children in the Donner Party only 46 survived to reach California.

== Critical reception ==
Time magazine called the film "a grueling, unforgettable trip" and named it one of the top ten television programs of the year. USA Today's Matt Roush wrote, "Historical narratives rarely have as much dire beauty as Ric Burns's The Donner Party, a documentary that aches with the austere eloquence of human desperation." Kevin Thomas of the Los Angeles Times characterized Burns as a "low key" director and wrote that the film "has everything: heroism, cowardice, stupefying folly and price and a truly terrible irony."

== Awards ==
- George Foster Peabody Award
- Writers Guild of America Award for Outstanding Achievement, 1993
- D. W. Griffith Award of the National Board of Review for the Best Television Program of 1992
- Directors Guild of America for Best Director, Documentary (nomination)
- EMMY Award for Writing & Directing (nomination)
