= Tongzhi in Love =

- Tongzhi in Love promotional poster
- Directed by: Ruby Yang
- Produced by: Thomas Lennon
- Cinematography: Yang Yishu
- Edited by: Gary Wong, Ruby Yang
- Music by: Bill Frisell; Brian Keane
- Production company: Thomas Lennon Films
- Distributed by: Cinema Guild
- Release date: June 18, 2008
- Running time: 30 minutes
- Countries: United States; China
- Languages: English; Mandarin

Tongzhi in Love is a 2008 short documentary film directed by Ruby Yang which portrays the life of gay men in China. The film was produced by Thomas Lennon and features music by Bill Frisell and Brian Keane. The film's world premiere was at the Silverdocs Film Festival in Washington, D.C., on 18 June 2008 and the West Coast premiere at the Frameline Film Festival in San Francisco on 28 June 2008. (Film was previously known as A Double Life and appears under that title in the Frameline catalog.) "Tongzhi" means "comrade" and has become a slang term for "gay" in several Asian countries. This film was shown at many film festivals and garnered several prestigious awards which include the Golden Gate Award for best documentary short the 52nd San Francisco International Film Festival and the Silver Award at Mix Brasil Festival of Diversity.

== See also ==
- Homosexuality in China
