= James Sanders (architect) =

American architect (born 1955)

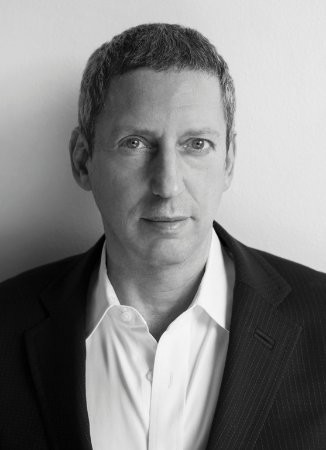
- Born: 1955 (age 70–71)
- Education: Columbia University; Columbia Graduate School of Architecture, Planning and Preservation; Massachusetts Institute of Technology
- Occupations: Architect; author; filmmaker
- Awards: Primetime Emmy Award for Outstanding Writing for a Nonfiction Programming (2007)
- Website: www.james-sanders-studio.net

James Sanders (born 1955) is an American architect, author, and filmmaker in New York City, whose work has garnered him a Guggenheim Fellowship, an Emmy Award, and elevation to the College of Fellows of the American Institute of Architects, the AIA's highest membership honor.

== Biography ==
James Sanders, FAIA, is a graduate of Columbia College (where he received the Chanler Prize in History) and Columbia University's Graduate School of Architecture, Planning and Preservation, and is an alumnus of the MIT School of Architecture + Planning. Since 1985 he has been principal of James Sanders Studio, an architecture, design and research practice located in New York City. He received a John Simon Guggenheim Memorial Fellowship for research on the experience of cities, and grants and fellowships from the Graham Foundation for Advanced Studies in the Visual Arts, the National Endowment for the Arts, the New York State Council for the Arts, and Furthermore, a program of the J.M. Kaplan Fund. In 2013 he was appointed Senior Fellow at the Center for Urban Real Estate in Columbia University's Graduate School of Architecture, Planning, and Preservation, to direct a pioneering research and conference initiative called Building the Digital City: Tech and the Transformation of New York.

Sanders co-founded the Architectural League's Prize Competition for young architects and designers, is a member of the American Institute of Architects, the Century Association, and the Writers Guild of America/East. He is a Fellow of the Forum for Urban Design, a Visiting Artist and Scholar at the American Academy in Rome, and sits on the Board of Trustees of The Skyscraper Museum. In 2021 he was elevated to the College of Fellows of the American Institute of Architects in recognition of his "notable contributions to the advancement of the profession of architecture."

From 2016 to 2023, Sanders served as Global Design Council Chairman and design consultant for the architecture firm, Woods Bagot.

== Architecture and urban design ==
Mr. Sanders' architecture, urban design, and development strategy projects include the Seaport Culture District, a coordinated program of seven installations in re-imagined indoor and outdoor spaces stretching across the South Street Seaport in Manhattan, sponsored by The Howard Hughes Corporation and activated by ten New York cultural partners including the AIA/NY Center for Architecture, Guggenheim Museum, American Institute of Graphic Arts/NY Chapter, Eyebeam, HarperCollins, and the Parsons School of Design; NYU Open House, a public event space and cultural center in Greenwich Village for New York University, "Seaport Past & Future" for General Growth Properties, and projects for the Related Companies, André Balazs Properties, South Street Seaport Museum, Ian Schrager Company, the Port Authority of New York & New Jersey, the Pershing Square Management Association in Los Angeles, and the Parks Council, where in the early 1980s he co-designed and co-developed the coordinated series of amenities—bookmarket, flower market, cafes—that initiated the revitalization of Bryant Park in midtown Manhattan, an effort described by MIT's Susan Silberberg as “one of the most dramatic examples of successful place-making in the last half century.”

Mr. Sanders' residential, commercial, and cultural design projects, for clients including New Yorker editor Bill Buford, the Columbia professor Edward W. Said, and the actress Molly Ringwald, have been featured in Interiors, Oculus, The Architect's Newspaper, The New Yorker, House Beautiful, The New York Times, and Architectural Digest, and have been exhibited at The Skyscraper Museum and the Museum of the City of New York.

== Celluloid Skyline and other books ==
In 2001, Sanders published his landmark study on the relationship of the city and film, Celluloid Skyline: New York and the Movies, which received an award from the Theatre Library Association in 2002, which was hailed as a "marvellous -- miraculous -- book" by the celebrated urbanist Jane Jacobs, and received unusually high praise from the film critic Richard Schickel in the Los Angeles Times: "Brilliantly acute...wonderfully informed and informative, Celluloid Skyline...is virtually without precedent...given its depth of research, the richly detailed elegance of its critical argument and, most important, its ability to expand and redirect the way we think....As [Sanders] observes, New York remains the single greatest locus…of American dreaming. Sanders is the Freud of that dream, its hugely informed and gracefully civilized interpreter."

In 2007, the book became the basis for a large-scale multimedia exhibition in Grand Central Terminal, co-designed by Sanders with Pentagram, and sponsored by Turner Classic Movies and Time Warner Cable. In her review, the New York Times critic Caryn James called the show "an eerie, dreamlike overlay of past and present."

Sanders’ book, Scenes from the City: Filmmaking in New York, featuring contributions by Martin Scorsese and Nora Ephron, was originally published in 2006, with a revised and expanded edition published in Spring 2014.

Together with Ric Burns, Sanders has recently produced a revised and expanded edition of New York: An Illustrated History, the bestselling companion volume to their eight-part PBS series, New York: A Documentary Film, published by Alfred A. Knopf. The new edition features two new chapters tracing the story of 21st century New York, new contributions by Adam Gopnik, Suketu Mehta and Ester Fuchs, and over 120 new illustrations, including the work of some of the city's most admired contemporary photographers.

In September 2023, Sanders published Renewing the Dream: The Mobility Revolution and the Future of Los Angeles, produced in association with Woods Bagot.

== Documentary films ==
Sanders co-conceived and co-wrote (with Burns) the award-winning PBS series, New York: A Documentary Film, and its bestselling companion volume, New York: An Illustrated History. The eight-part, 17½-hour film series chronicles the city's rise from tiny Dutch trading post through its preeminence as economic and cultural capital of the world. The series won several Emmy Awards and a Columbia-Dupont award. Sanders and Burns are writing and producing a new ninth and tenth episode of the series for national public television broadcast in 2026.

With Burns, Sanders co-wrote Andy Warhol: A Documentary Film, narrated by Laurie Anderson, for which he received a Primetime Emmy Award for Outstanding Writing for a Nonfiction Programming in 2007.

== Exhibitions & multimedia projects ==
In addition to the 2007 "Celluloid Skyline" installation in Grand Central, Sanders has created several major exhibit and multimedia installations, including "The Constant Future: A Century of the Regional Plan" celebrating the centennial of the Regional Plan Association, which opened in October 2022 in Grand Central Terminal's Vanderbilt Hall, "Timescapes", the permanent orientation installation at the Museum of the City of New York (created with Local Projects, and narrated by Stanley Tucci), "An American Synagogue" (produced by Picture Projects, and narrated by Leonard Nimoy) at Beth Sholom Synagogue in Elkins Park, PA, "Seaport Past and Future," at the South Street Seaport, and the "Celluloid Skyline" website, which was called "the most beautiful website about New York" by Manhattan Users Guide (MUG.com). His exhibition "Three Buildings," sponsored by the NYC Landmarks Preservation Commission and held at the CUNY Graduate Center, explored the architecture and urbanism of Grand Central Terminal, the New York Public Library, and the Times Tower. In her review, the New York Times architecture critic Ada Louise Huxtable described it as "a model of what such an exhibition should be...I don't know when I've seen a better architecture show in a more appropriate setting."

== Articles and essays ==
Sanders is a frequent contributor to the New York Times, and has written articles and essays for The New Yorker, Los Angeles Times, Vanity Fair, and Architectural Record, and co-wrote New York City's official bid book for the 2012 Olympic Games.

== Bibliography ==
- New York: An Illustrated History (with Ric Burns). New York: Alfred A. Knopf, 1999. Revised and Expanded Editions, 2003, 2021. Munich: Frederking & Thaler, 2002.
- Celluloid Skyline: New York and the Movies. New York: Alfred A. Knopf, 2001. London: Bloomsbury, 2002.
- Scenes from the City: Filmmaking in New York. New York: Rizzoli, 2006. Revised and Expanded Edition, 2013.
- Renewing the Dream: The Mobility Revolution and the Future of Los Angeles, editor. New York: Rizzoli, 2023.

== Filmography ==
- New York: A Documentary Film (1999; expanded 2003; narrated by David Ogden Stiers. (Two new episodes are currently in production for national PBS broadcast in 2026.)
- Columbia: A Celebration (2004), narrated by Brian Dennehy.
- Timescapes (2005), narrated by Stanley Tucci, with Local Projects
- Andy Warhol: A Documentary Film (2006), narrated by Laurie Anderson.
- An American Synagogue: Frank Lloyd Wright, Mortimer J. Cohen and the Making of Beth Sholom (2009), narrated by Leonard Nimoy.
- South Street Seaport: Between Past & Future (2015), narrated by Liev Schreiber.
