= George F. Keane =

American investment banker (1929–2021)

George F. Kean
- Died: May 20, 2021 (aged 91)
- Occupation: Investor
- Known for: Financing of American higher education

George F. Keane (October 7, 1929 – May 20, 2021) was an investment manager who has made contributions to the financing of United States higher education. He organized the Common Fund (now known as the Common Fund Group), a non-profit investment group designed to bring investment advice to higher education institutions that could otherwise not afford such services.

== Early life and education ==
Keane was born October 7, 1929, to Alexander Keane (a former minstrel singer) and Anna Krebs Keane, and raised in Danbury, Connecticut. He attended Fairfield College Preparatory School and Fairfield University. He then attended the University of Pennsylvania School of Law, where he met his first wife, Winifred Harbert Keane. They lived in Westport, Connecticut, and have three children, the oldest of whom is composer and producer Brian Keane.

George Keane married Renée Bacal in 1982. Renée has three children from a previous marriage to Leonard Shwartz. They lived in Westport, Connecticut, and Trumbull, Connecticut, before retiring to University Park, Florida, near Sarasota, in 1997. George and Renée stayed happily married until she died in June 2013.

== Career ==
Keane started his career with ten years as an officer of TIAA-CREF, and three years as a member of the Higher Education consulting group at Peat, Marwick, Mitchell & Co.

At the Common Fund he was chief executive from its inception in 1971 until he was named President Emeritus and Senior Investment Adviser in 1993; he retired in 1996. Starting with a Ford Foundation grant in 1971, the Common Fund Group now serves more than 1,500 institutions who have invested over $40 billion.

After his retirement from the Common Fund, he had an active second career, as Chairman of Trigen Energy from 1994 until March 2000, when the company was taken private. He was a Director of United Negro College Fund for twelve years, and helped organize SCUUL, a special purpose liability insurance company for educational institutions.

He was a director of four mutual fund companies, a trust company, a steel company, a generic drug manufacturer, a co-generation company, and an oil & gas company. He was a member of the Investment Advisory Committee of the New York State Common Retirement Fund from 1985 to 2004, under three state comptrollers. After the dot-com bubble burst he advocated for the creation of a new index in place of the S&P 500, and worked with Research Affiliates in the development of the Fundamental Index. He was a trustee, vice chairman of the board, and member of the finance committee of Fairfield University, and was on the Investment committee of the University of South Florida.

Keane has been awarded honorary doctorate degrees by Loyola University (Chicago) and Lawrence University for his contributions to higher education. He is the recipient of the Frederick D. Patterson award for his service as a director of the United Negro College Fund.
