= In Search of Perfect Consonance =

2016 Hong Kong film by Ruby Yang

- Film poster
- 《尋找完美第五度》
- Directed by: Ruby Yang
- Produced by: Ruby Yang
- Cinematography: Yiu Fai Wong; Mike Mak; Harry Lee
- Release date: July 17, 2016
- Running time: 38 minutes
- Country: Hong Kong
- Language: English

In Search of Perfect Consonance (Chinese: 尋找完美第五度) is a 2016 Hong Kong short documentary film directed by Chinese-American filmmaker Ruby Yang. Released in 2016, the film profiles the Asian Youth Orchestra (AYO), established in 1987 to promote peace in the region. Against the backdrop of historical tensions in the region, it highlights how music serves as a unifying force, forging deep bonds between musicians despite cultural and national differences. The film premiered in Hong Kong cinemas on 17 July 2016.

== Synopsis ==
The documentary delves into the origins and legacy of the Asian Youth Orchestra, founded by Richard Pontzious with support from legendary violinist Yehudi Menuhin. At the time of its inception, China and Vietnam were engaged in a border war, Sino-Japanese relations were strained, and tensions persisted across the Taiwan Strait. In this challenging geopolitical climate, Pontzious envisioned an orchestra that would transcend political divisions and unite young musicians through their shared passion for classical music.

The film follows today's young musicians from the Asian Youth Orchestra during an intense summer program of rehearsals and a three-week concert tour of Asia. Selected from thousands of applicants across the region, the students overcame national and cultural differences, learning to listen and work with their fellow musicians, allowing them to reconnect with their shared passion for music. This passion not only allows their talents to bloom but also creates deep bonds between them. The close bonds between musicians are at the heart of the Asian Youth Orchestra and form the basis of the story explored in the film, delving into the origins and inspirations behind the creation of the Asian Youth Orchestra, with the hope of uniting Asia through a common passion for classical music. Therefore, it seems appropriate that the piece being prepared by the young orchestra for their three-week concert tour is nothing less than the last movement of Beethoven's 9th Symphony, one that emphasizes brotherhood and, as young Taiwanese bass trombonist Shao Hua Wu says, is "full of hope."

== Production ==
Filming took place during the summer of 2015, starting in June and concluding in mid-August. The majority of the filming occurred in Hong Kong, with multiple locations including the Hong Kong Coliseum, the Peak, and the Hong Kong Academy for Performing Arts. Additional footage was captured at the Tokyo Opera City Concert Hall during the final performance of their three-week concert tour of Asia.

== Asian Youth Orchestra ==
Set up in 1987, the Asian Youth Orchestra is the brainchild of artistic director Richard Pontzious whose vision was to create an orchestra that united the region whilst celebrating the excellence of aspiring Asian musicians. The orchestra quickly gathered support from distinguished musicians across the globe including violinist Yehudi Menuhin The Asian Youth Orchestra played its very first concert at the Kumamoto Music Festival in Japan in 1990. Each year, thousands of aspiring musicians from across Asia audition for a place in the orchestra. Over its rich history, the Asian Youth Orchestra has trained 2,000 young musicians, many of whom have gone on to have successful careers in music and become messengers of peace in Asia.

Since its inception, the Asian Youth Orchestra has given more than 350 performances in some of the world's top venues, reaching over a million concertgoers. The San Francisco Chronicle described the orchestra as the "finest among youth orchestras around the world."
