= Declassified (2004 TV series) =

American TV series (2004–2006)

- Created by: Kosh; Susan Shearer; John J. Flynn
- Narrated by: John J. Flynn
- Country of origin: United States
- No. of episodes: 14

Production
- Running time: 45 – 50 minutes

Original release
- Network: History Channel
- Release: March 30, 2004 – January 5, 2006

Declassified is an American television series produced by Ten Worlds Productions on the History Channel that originally aired on November 9, 2004. The series takes viewers inside vaults and archives around the world to reveal the untold stories of modern history. With the fall of the Iron Curtain and the advent of market economies worldwide, new footage and materials are flooding out of formerly secret organizations like East Germany's Stasi, the Kremlin, the U.S. Central Intelligence Agency, and state television in Korea. Declassified reveals the stories behind the previously unseen footage with relentless, fast-cut montage and a rock beat. Declassified fuses modern graphics and editing, story-telling, rock music (from Blackie Lawless of W.A.S.P.) and expert interviews to bring to light the thrilling and secret tales of our modern era.

The show's director Kosh, winner of three Grammy Awards, is the former creative director for Apple Records and designer for the Beatles and Eagles. Produced and created by Susan Shearer, John J. Flynn and Kosh. Executive produced by Carl Lindahl for the History Channel.

== Episodes ==
Title	Original airdate	Production code
"Declassified: The Rise and Fall of the Wall"	July 14, 2004	PILOT (1.1)
For three decades, it symbolized the chasm between East and West, a constantly simmering focal point of the Cold War. But on November 9, 1989, the long-oppressed citizens of East Berlin broke the first chink in its 96 miles of concrete and barbed wire, signaling the start of one of history's most dramatic political transformations.
"Declassified: The Taliban"	January 5, 2006	(1.2)
To the United States and the Soviet Union, Afghanistan was always a pawn in a much bigger game. First the Soviets bought them off and then the U.S. sent in arms. The Russians sent in troops and we sent in the CIA to train the Mujahedin to kill the Russians. But then came the Taliban and the pawns started moving on their own. We'll mine the guarded vaults and archives around the world to reveal the untold story of how the pieces turned on the players and the jihad came to Kabul and the streets of New York.
"Declassified: John Lennon"	January 12, 2006	(1.3)
John Kerry and Martin Luther King Jr. both made the list, but so did one very famous Brit--John Lennon. From 1956 to 1971, the U.S. Federal Bureau of Investigation reacted to social changes such as the Civil Rights Movement with a sweeping counter intelligence program, inelegantly dubbed COINTELPRO. Using information obtained under the Freedom of Information Act, this program details how John, his family and his friends were affected by the FBI's attentions.
"Declassified: Tiananmen Square"	January 19, 2006	(1.4)
The famed demonstrations in Beijing's Tiananmen Square started out as China's answer to Woodstock, but ended like Kent State.
"Declassified: Lindbergh"	January 26, 2006	(1.5)
There are some heroes whose place in history is so firm that few revelations could threaten it. But in the years between, Charles Lindbergh won the favor of the most reviled government of the 20th century, Nazi Germany.
"Declassified: Joseph Stalin"	February 2, 2006	(1.6)
Joseph Stalin remains a powerful and dark figure even 50 years after his death. His legacy as a personification of evil in the 20th century rivals Adolf Hitler's. Using newly unearthed materials and testimony, the episode reveals a never-before-seen Stalin.
"Declassified: Castro the Survivor"	February 9, 2006	(1.7)
Despite the best efforts of the U.S. government, legal and illegal, Fidel Castro still rules in Havana. The target of a protracted series of assassination attempts, he survived them all.
"Declassified: Viet Cong"	February 16, 2006	(1.8)
From hidden tunnel cities deep in the jungle, the Viet Cong launched operations that were terrifying in their ingenuity, savagery, and persistence. U.S. commanders made the mistake of fighting this battle as they had fought World War II. The North Vietnamese, employing a very different set of strategies, built a massive warren of tunnels and then faded into Laos when the battle turned against them.
"Declassified: Radical America, Left & Right"	February 23, 2006	(1.9)
The United States was founded by radicals—men and women who fought using guerilla tactics against the British. Nothing's changed on the edges: America is still the home of radical movements, from the Black Panthers and the Weather Underground to the Militia movement and the Aryan Brotherhood.
"Declassified: Ayatollah Khomeini"	March 2, 2006	(1.10)
Before the world heard of Osama bin Laden, there was Ayatollah Khomeini—at the time, the most radical Muslim leader of the 20th century, who challenged the world's "infidels" in the name of Allah.
"Declassified: The Tet Offensive"	March 9, 2006	(1.11)
The Tet Offensive in 1968 was a series of crucial battles in the Vietnam War. On 31 January 1968, the first day of the celebration of the Lunar New Year—Vietnam's most important holiday—the Vietnamese Communists launched a major offensive throughout South Vietnam.
"Declassified: The Secrets of WWI"	March 16, 2006	(1.12)
This is the secret story of how The War To End All Wars was fought—and what happened when the first Weapons of Mass Destruction reached the battlefield. This is the forgotten story of the secret deals, government mistakes, and political intolerance of America's role in World War I.
"Declassified: Godfathers of Havana"	March 23, 2006	(1.13)
Two hundred and thirty miles south of Miami, Havana was a tropical paradise fueled by rum, rumba and gangsters. Havana was at the crossroads of the Mafia controlled narcotic super-highway before the Cuban Revolution took down the corrupt, Batiste government.
"Declassified: Chairman Mao"	March 30, 2006	(1.14)
Mao Zedong was the 20th century's answer to Napoleon: a brilliant tactician, a political and economic theorist, and a vicious leader who ruled a billion people for three decades with an iron fist.

== See also ==
- Freedom of Information Act
- Classified information
