= Into the Deep: America, Whaling & the World =

- Written by: Ric Burns
- Directed by: Ric Burns
- Narrated by: Willem Dafoe
- Theme music composer: Brian Keane
- Country of origin: United States
- Original language: English

Production
- Producers: Bonnie Lafave; Mary Recine; Robin Espinola; Ric Burns
- Cinematography: Buddy Squires; Paul Goldsmith
- Editor: Li-Shin Yu
- Running time: 120 minutes

Original release
- Release: May 10, 2010

Into the Deep: America, Whaling & the World is a two-hour documentary by Ric Burns about the history of the whaling industry in the United States. The film was initially released on May 10, 2010.

== Overview ==
A film chronicling the American whaling industry from its origins in New England in the 17th century, through the golden age of deep-sea whaling, up to its decline following the Civil War. Narrated by Willem Dafoe, this film binds the story of American capitalism on the rise with a case study in maritime culture. The fate of the whaleship Essex—which set sail from Nantucket in the summer of 1819—is interwoven with the story of a young Herman Melville, whose own imaginative voyage into the deep would give rise to one of the greatest works of American literature, Moby Dick.

Other voices heard in the film include Robert Sean Leonard as Herman Melville, Josh Hamilton as Owen Chase & Peleg Folger and Vincent Kartheiser as Thomas Nickerson.

== Awards and nominations ==
- 31st News & Documentary Emmy Awards (2010) - Outstanding Nonfiction Series (nominated)
- History Makers Nomination Best History Production
- International Documentary Association Awards Nomination

== Soundtrack ==
The documentary's original soundtrack, composed by Brian Keane, was released by Valley Entertainment on CD and in digital formats.

== See also ==
- In the Heart of the Sea, a 2015 American film based on the non-fiction book of the same name
