= Thomas Lennon (filmmaker) =

American film director

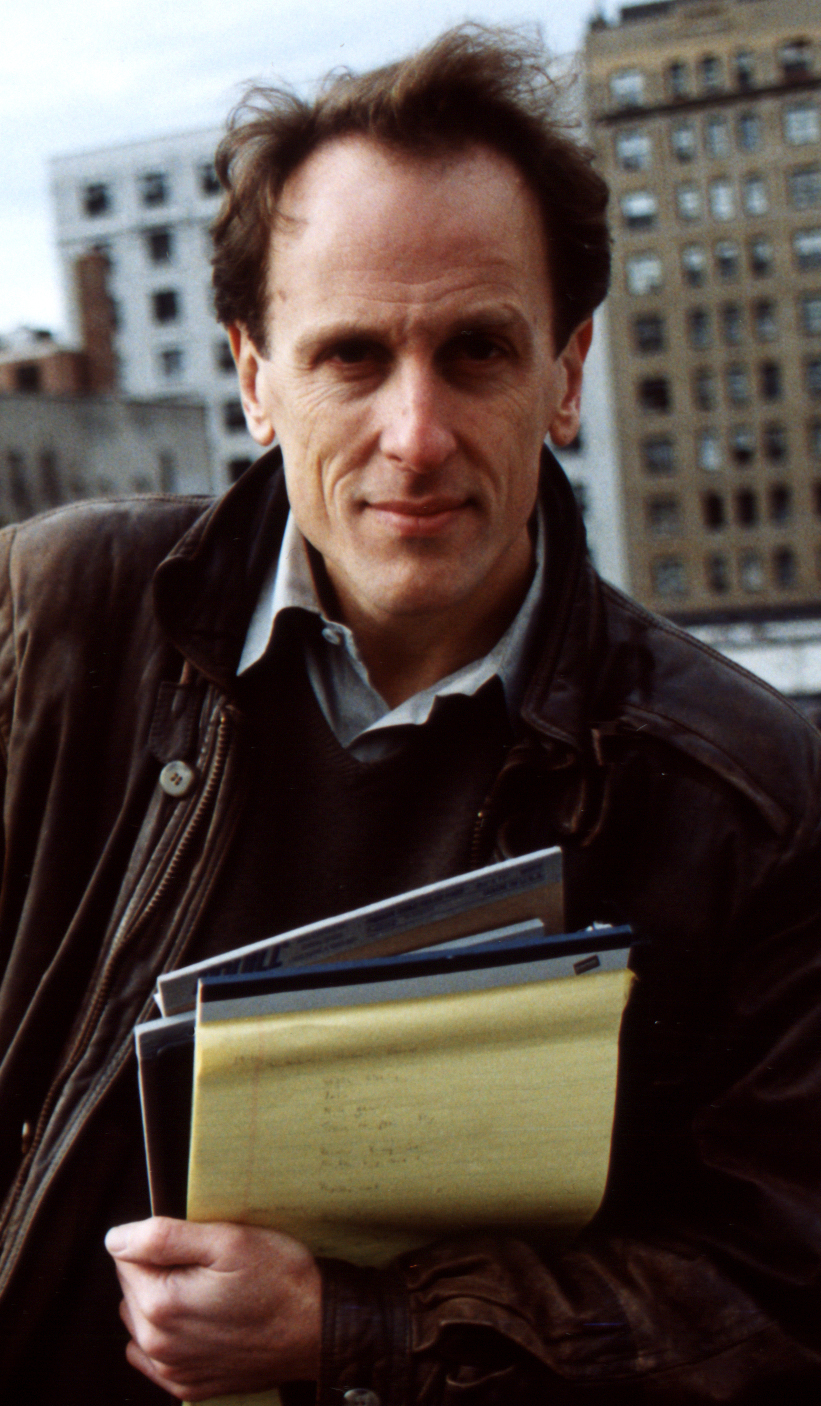
Image of Lennon

Thomas Furneaux Lennon (born November 3, 1951) is a documentary filmmaker. He was born in Washington, D.C., graduated from Phillips Exeter Academy in 1968 and Yale University in 1973.

Thomas F. Lennon's films, broadcast on PBS and HBO, have won an Academy Award and have been nominated for the Oscar four times. He has also received two George Foster Peabody Awards, two national Emmys and two DuPont-Columbia Journalism awards. With filmmaker Ruby Yang, he mounted a vast multi-year AIDS prevention campaign seen over a billion times on Chinese television. Together they made a trilogy of short documentary films about modern China, including The Blood of Yingzhou District, which won an Oscar in 2007, and The Warriors of Qiugang, nominated in 2011, which profiles an Anhui Province farmer's multi-year campaign to halt the poisoning of his village water by a nearby factory. Three weeks after the Oscar nomination, the local government of Bengbu, in Anhui, announced a 200 million yuan (US$30 million) clean-up of the toxic site shown in the film. He produced two historical series on PBS: The Irish in America: Long Journey Home (1998) and Becoming American: The Chinese Experience with Bill Moyers (2003). The Battle Over Citizen Kane (1996) co-written with the late Richard Ben Cramer, marked his first Oscar nomination. It premiered at Sundance and was adapted into a fiction film, RKO 281, starring John Malkovich and Melanie Griffith.

In 2017, he completed Knife Skills about the launch of Edwins, an haute cuisine French restaurant in Cleveland, staffed by men and women recently released from prison; in January 2018, this was nominated for an Oscar. "Sacred" (2016) explores the use of prayer and ritual in daily life. More than 40 filmmakers around the world contributed scenes to the film, which premiered at the Tokyo Film Festival, showed at 25 festivals worldwide and aired on PBS in December 2018.

"Cutting Through Rocks" on which he served as a Contributing Producer won the International Documentary Grand Jury Prize at the 2024 Sundance Film Festival.

Since 2018, Thomas Lennon has served as the director of the Documentary Film Lab at Rutgers University. In 2021, Variety profiled him as one of the "top 50 film instructors from around the world."

Lennon lives and works in New York City. He is married to the medical researcher Joan Reibman, best known for her work on the health of 9/11 survivors. He is at times confused with the writer-comedian Thomas Lennon and has twice had to send back large royalty checks.

== Filmography ==
- "Cutting Through Rocks" (2024) Contributing Producer & Editing Consultant. Winner Grand Jury Prize, Sundance Film Festival
- "This Is Pike County" (2024) Producer
- "We Are Suns" (2021) Producer. Sarasota Film Festival Montclair Film Festival
- "Knife Skills" (2017) (Producer-Director-Cinematographer) Academy Award nomination. Winner Audience Award, Traverse City Film Festival. San Francisco's Doc Stories, DocNYC and other festivals.
- "Sacred" (2016) Producer & Director. Shot by 40 filmmaking teams worldwide. Film Festivals: Hong Kong, DocNYC, Amsterdam (IDFA), Biarritz (FIPA), Sebastopol, etc. Aired on PBS 2018
- "The Trail from Xingjiang" (2013) Senior Creative Consultant
- "Angle of Attack" (2011) – writer, cinematographer, producer —Public Television
- The Warriors of Qiugang (2010) – writer, producer. Oscar nominee, Documentary Short Subject
- Tongzhi in Love (2008) – producer. Jury Prize, San Francisco Int'l Film Festival
- The Supreme Court, PBS (2007) – director (International Documentary Association, Best Series, 2007; Silver Gavel Award, American Bar Association, 2008)
- The Blood of Yingzhou District (2006) – producer (Academy Award winner – best documentary short subject; 2007 Excellence in Media Award – Global Health Council International Documentary Festival; Chicago Doc Humanitarian Award – Chicago International Documentary Film Festival; Golden Reel Jury Prize, Best Short – VC FilmFest; Grand Jury Award – AFI Silverdocs Film Festival; Audience Award – Thessaloniki International Documentary Film Festival; Jury Prize Award – Documenta International Film Festival; Jury Prize Award – RiverRun International Film Festival; Nominated for Documentary Awards at the Hawaii International Film Festival, The Fund for Santa Barbara, the International Documentary Association, and the DOCNZ Film Festival)
- Terry Sanford & the New South (2006) – producer, director, writer (Full-Frame Documentary Festival (premiere))
- Becoming American: The Chinese Experience, PBS mini-series (2003) – series producer, writer (Emmy nominations (four); Writers' Guild nomination; IDA nomination; Christopher Award)
- Unchained Memories: Readings from the Slave Narratives, HBO (2003) – producer, director (Sundance Film Festival (premiere), Emmy nominations (two); Christopher Award)
- Producer, director, writer: Thomas Lennon; Writer: Shelby Steele (May 2, 2000). "Jefferson's Blood". Frontline. PBS.
- RKO 281, HBO (1999) (starring John Malkovich, Liev Schreiber, Melanie Griffith) – consultant (Golden Globe Award, Emmy Awards (three))
- The Irish in America: Long Journey Home, PBS mini-series (1998) – series producer, director, writer (Emmy Award (four nominations) Writers' Guild nomination, Grammy Award for soundtrack CD)
- The Battle Over Citizen Kane, The American Experience (PBS, 1996) – producer, director, writer (Sundance Film Festival, Berlin Film Festival, Academy Award nomination, Emmy Nomination, George Foster Peabody Award, Writers' Guild Award)
- The Battle of the Bulge, PBS The American Experience (1994) – producer, writer (duPont-Columbia Award; Emmy nominations (two), George Foster Peabody Award)
- Tabloid Truth, PBS Frontline (1994) – producer, writer (Writers' Guild nomination)
- The Choice (1992) – producer, writer (San Francisco International Film Festival Grand Jury Award, George Foster Peabody Award)
- Seven Days in Bensonhurst, Frontline (PBS, 1990) – producer, writer (Emmy, Outstanding Documentary, Writers' Guild, Outstanding Documentary Script.)
- Demon Rum (1989) – producer, writer
