= Against Wind and Tide: A Cuban Odyssey =

1981 film

- Genre: Documentary
- Written by: John Brousek
- Directed by: Jim Burroughs
- Country of origin: United States
- Original language: English

Production
- Executive producer: David Fanning
- Producers: Susanne Bauman; Jim Burroughs; Harvey Flaxman; Paul Neshamkin
- Production locations: Fort Chaffee, Arkansas; Key West; Mariel, Cuba; Straits of Florida
- Editors: Suzanne Bauman; Paul Neshamkin
- Running time: 60 minutes
- Production company: Seven League Productions

Original release
- Network: PBS
- Release: December 1981

Against Wind and Tide: A Cuban Odyssey is a 1981 American documentary film about the Mariel boatlift. It was first broadcast on PBS' WORLD the week of June 1, 1981.

== Awards ==
Against Wind and Tide was nominated for the Academy Award for Best Documentary Feature.

Against Wind and Tide won a CINE Golden Eagle.
