= Ruby Yang =

American film producer

Ruby Yang (traditional Chinese: 楊紫燁; simplified Chinese: 杨紫烨) is an accomplished Hong Kong-born American filmmaker and educator who currently heads the School of Future Media at the University of Hong Kong. Yang's work as a documentary filmmaker has earned her an Academy Award, two Academy nominations, and numerous other accolades, including an Emmy, the DuPont-Columbia Journalism Award, FilmAid Asia's Humanitarian Award, the Global Health Council Media Award and two IDA Pare Lorentz Award nominations. Since joining HKU in 2013, Yang has taught documentary filmmaking at the Journalism and Media Studies Centre (which has become a foundation division of the School of Future Media) and completed four documentaries. In 2015, she was honored with an Honorary Fellowship from The Hong Kong Academy for Performing Arts for her achievements and contributions to the performing arts. In 2018, she received the prestigious Artist of the Year (Film) award at the Hong Kong Arts Development Awards, recognizing her impact as a documentarian.

== Biography ==
Yang was born in Hong Kong. She moved to the United States in 1977 to study filmmaking at the San Francisco Art Institute. After graduation, she worked as an editor on many Chinese American documentaries and mainstream Hollywood films.

Yang relocated to Beijing in 2004 and moved back to Hong Kong in 2013. She was appointed by the University of Hong Kong as Hung Leung Hau Ling Distinguished Fellow in Humanities in the fall of 2013.. As of October 2025, Yang is the director of School of Future Media at the University of Hong Kong. Launched in 2025, SFS consists of three pillars: the foundational Journalism and Media Studies Center (which teaches journalism), Documentary and AI Film making, and Global Creative Industries.

In 2003, Yang co-founded the Chang Ai Media Project with filmmaker Thomas F. Lennon to raise awareness of HIV/AIDS in China. The project's documentaries and public service announcements have reached over 900 millions viewers. As part of this effort, Lennon and Yang made a trilogy of short documentary films about modern China, including The Blood of Yingzhou District (2006), which won Academy Award for Best Documentary Short Film in 2007, Tongzhi in Love (2008), which was shortlisted in the same category, and The Warriors of Qiugang (2011), which was nominated for Academy.

Her feature documentary My Voice, My Life (2014) won the 2015 NPT Human Spirit Award at the Nashville Film Festival.

In 2015, Yang established Hong Kong Documentary Initiative (HKDI), aiming at fostering Hong Kong documentary filmmakers. It provided grants for 18 local projects, including Chan Tze-woon's Blue Island (2022). HKDI regularly hosts live interviews and dialogues with prominent filmmakers, until 2020.

The Last Stitch (2019) is another documentary project, that Yang worked as a producer, explores generations of a family of tailors emigrated from Hong Kong to Canada. It captures the disappearing art of handmade Chinese Cheongsam.

In 2024, three of Yang's films are shown in Asian Avant-Garde Film Festival at M+ Museum.

== Filmography ==
=== As director ===
- My Voice, My Life Revisited (2020)《繼續爭氣》
- Ritoma (2018)《仁多瑪》
- In Search of Perfect Consonance (2016)《尋找完美第五度》
- My Voice, My Life (2014)《爭氣》
- The Warriors of Qiugang (2010)《仇崗衛士》
- A Moment in Time (2009)《聲光轉逝》
- Tongzhi in Love (2008)《彼岸浮生》
- The Blood of Yingzhou District (2006)《颍州的孩子》
- Julia’s Story (2005)《朱力亞的故事》
- China 21 (2002)《中國一二》
- Citizen Hong Kong (1999)《風雨故園》

=== As editor (partial list) ===
- Becoming American: The Chinese Experience series (2003)
  - Program One: Gold Mountain Dreams
  - Program Two: Between Two Worlds
  - Program Three: No Turning Back
- Promises (2001)
- Autumn in New York (2000)
- Xiu Xiu: The Sent Down Girl (1998)《天浴》
- Street Soldier (1997)
- All Power to the People (1996)
- A.K.A. Don Bonus (1995)
- China: The Wild East (1994)
- The Joy Luck Club (1993)《喜福會》, assistant editor

=== As producer (partial list) ===
- Ah Cheung: Wings of Hope (2024)《無拘飛祥》
- M for Malaysia (2019)
- The Last Stitch (2019)《雙縫》
- Addicted Innocence (2018)
- Gateless (2018)
- China's Forgotten Daughters (2017)《江南棄兒》
- Please Remember Me (2015)《我祇認識你》
- Fish Stories (2013)
- Whisper of Minqing (2012)
- Xiu Xiu: The Sent Down Girl (1998)《天浴》

=== Other ===
- Take Out (2004)《外賣》
- China Cry: A True Story (1990)《天國生與死》
- Dim Sum: A Little Bit of Heart (1985)《點心》

== See also ==
- HIV/AIDS in the People's Republic of China
