= Diaoyu Islands: The Truth =

Diaoyu Islands - The Truth
- Diaoyu Islands - The Truth artwork
- Directed by: Chris D. Nebe
- Produced by: J.J. Osbun
- Distributed by: Monarex Hollywood Corp
- Release date: March 11, 2014 (Los Angeles)
- Running time: 42 minutes
- Countries: United States; China

Diaoyu Islands - The Truth is a documentary film produced by Chris D. Nebe and J.J. Osbun of Monarex Hollywood Corporation and directed by Chris D. Nebe that purports to tell the People's Republic of China's side of the Diaoyu/Senkaku Islands dispute with Japan. Diaoyu is the Chinese name for the islands, which are known as Senkaku in Japan.

Nebe calls on the Japanese Government to cede the islands to China, asserting that Japan has no justifiable claim to the islands, and that the United States of America has turned a blind eye in Japan's favor due to the need of the United States to have a strong ally between it and China.

== Background ==
The legality surrounding the ownership of the islands is disputed, and no real consensus exists. 'Diaoyu Islands - The Truth', explains the troubled history between China and Japan, and argues that China has been mistreated since the end of World War II by the Cold-War West. In 1969 the UN Economic Commission for Asia and Far East reported the islands were possibly rich with natural resources. Recently, they have become a rallying point for Chinese and Japanese nationalism alike.

Nebe, an erotica filmmaker during the 1970s, was quoted in the Central Committee of the Chinese Communist Party's official newspaper, People's Daily, that he spent $US500,000 out of his own money working on Diaoyu Islands - The Truth. In interviews, Nebe has claimed that he thinks China is misunderstood and made out to be a villain by the West. The goal of his documentary is to help people see a different side of the country.

== Description ==
The film starts and ends with statements by Nebe. It provides general information about the history between China and Japan. Using a series of graphics and effects, it skips quickly from ancient times to the late 19th Century, when the First Sino-Japanese War took place. From there the story becomes one of the tragedies that China suffered under Japan during World War II, which are used as a basis for Nebe's reasoning that Japan owes China not only the islands, but also an apology for their aggressive war-time policies. In its conclusion, the film calls for peace between the two nations, but puts the majority of responsibility on the shoulders of Japan.

== Reception ==
Reception of the film was positive in Chinese state media. Nebe has countered claims of making pro-China propaganda by stating on the Australian Broadcasting Corporation's Correspondents Report that he paid to make the film on his own.

In 2015 the film received a Gold Award at the WorldFest-Houston International Film Festival.
