= William Turnage =

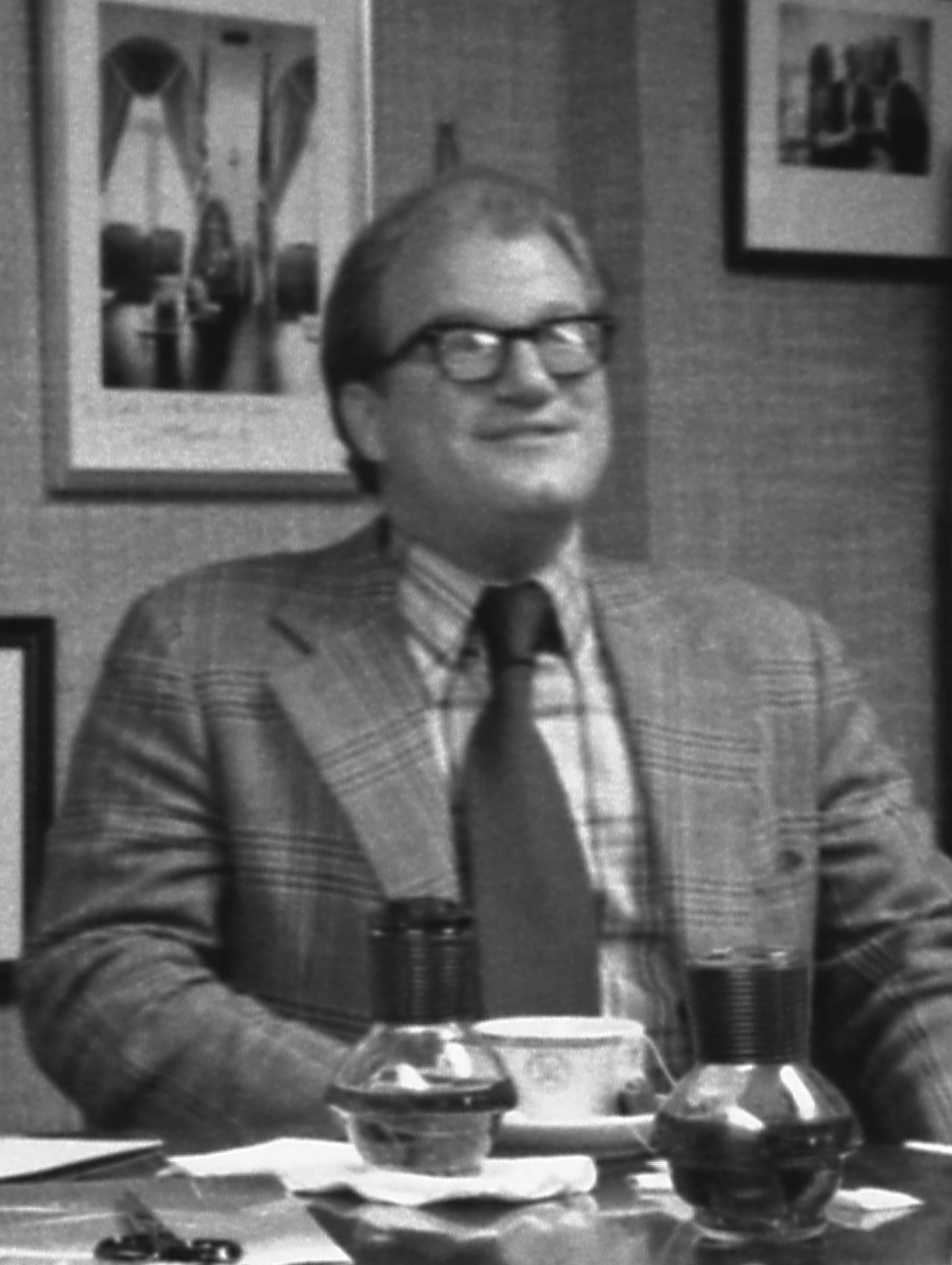
William Turnage, 1975

William Albert Turnage (December 9, 1942 – October 15, 2017) was the director of The Wilderness Society from 1978 to 1985 and business manager of photographer Ansel Adams. He was known for turning the Wilderness Society into a more professional advocacy group, and was an outspoken critic of James G. Watt, the Interior Secretary in the Reagan Administration. Born in Tucson and raised in Washington, D.C., Turnage earned a degree in history from Yale University in 1965 and entered Yale Law School before switching to the Yale School of Forestry and Environmental Studies. He met Adams while working with Yale Chubb Fellowship and left school shortly after Adams invited him to manage his photography.
