= New York: A Documentary Film =

- Written by: Ric Burns; James Sanders; Ron Blumer (episode 5 only)
- Directed by: Ric Burns
- Country of origin: United States
- Original language: English
- No. of episodes: 10

Original release
- Network: PBS
- Release: November 14, 1999 – September 22, 2026

New York: A Documentary Film is a ten-part, 21½ hour, American documentary film on the history of New York City directed by Ric Burns. It originally aired in the U.S. on PBS, with eight episodes first airing between 1999 and 2003, and an additional two in 2026. The film was a production of Steeplechase Films in association with WGBH Boston, Thirteen/WNET, and The New-York Historical Society.

The series was written by Burns and James Sanders and produced by Burns's company, Steeplechase Films. Several noted New York City historians, including Mike Wallace, Kenneth T. Jackson, David Levering Lewis and Robert Caro participated in the making of the series as consultants, and appeared on camera. It was narrated by David Ogden Stiers (episodes 1–8) and Robert Sean Leonard (episodes 9–10).

Other notable figures who appeared in the series include Rudolph Giuliani (then the mayor of New York City during episodes 1–7), former mayor Ed Koch, former New York governor Mario Cuomo, former U.S. Senator Daniel Patrick Moynihan, poet Allen Ginsberg, novelists Alfred Kazin and Brendan Gill, director Martin Scorsese, journalist Pete Hamill, former Congresswoman Bella Abzug, historian Niall Ferguson, philosopher Marshall Berman, writer Fran Lebowitz, engineer Leslie E. Robertson, architect Robert A.M. Stern, high wire artist Philippe Petit, real estate developer (and future President) Donald Trump, and author David McCullough.

== Production ==
Little could we have imagined, when we completed what we thought was the final episode of New York: A Documentary Film in the summer of 2001, how powerfully these underlying themes would resonate with the events that overtook New York just a few weeks later -- or the unforgettable response of the city in the months after that.

— Ric Burns

In 1987, Ric Burns and James Sanders conceived the idea of a multi-part television series on the history of New York City. In 1993, Burns, having completed The Way West two years earlier, collaborated with Sanders and Lisa Ades to win a grant from the NEH, and he and Sanders began writing the script for New York. Lisa Ades and Steve Rivo assisted with the initial research. Thirteen joined the project soon after to complete fundraising. The cost of the series through Episode Five was $9.8 million, with more than 20 people involved with the series at its peak. The crew worked out of two offices near 72nd Street and Broadway, in New York City.

New sequences and imagery for New York were shot on 16mm film. The first half of the series was edited traditionally, but Burns reluctantly agreed to edit the second half digitally, on Avid workstations. In retrospect, Burns viewed the computer as an essential tool for managing the huge amount of archival material included in the film.

== Release ==
Originally, Burns planned for a 10-hour series. However, this plan was abandoned, and the first 10 hours (five two-hour episodes) told the story of New York City only up to 1931. The film up to this point was released in 1999, with plans to produce a sixth episode covering the remaining years. However, this plan, too, was abandoned in favor of two additional episodes, Episode Six (running 120 minutes) and Episode Seven (running 140 minutes). Both were released in September and October 2001, just weeks after the September 11th attacks.

Following the events of September 11, Burns, Sanders, and their team were inspired to produce an eighth episode of the film, focusing on the World Trade Center and its role in New York City's history.

Burns, Sanders, and Steeplechase Films are producing for broadcast episodes nine and ten of the series about contemporary New York City. The film will explore in dramatic detail how New York City has grappled on the local level with critical issues of immigration, diversity, growth, economic change, climate change, social justice and governance – issues that have become critical challenges around the globe. The film will demonstrate how the entire world is rapidly acquiring the characteristics of the modern city New York has pioneered for four hundred years – and that New York remains, as it nears the beginning of its fifth century as a metropolis, the pre-eminent and in most respects most successful urban laboratory on the planet: a place where the challenges and opportunities of modernity are confronted with an intensity and vision unparalleled in the world – and where the most critical human experiment on earth continues to unfold: the crucial, sometimes harrowing experiment, to see if all the peoples of the world can live together in a single place.

== Episodes ==
The first five episodes aired in November 1999. Episodes Six and Seven aired in September and October 2001, respectively. A new episode, which chronicled the rise and fall of the World Trade Center, was produced after the September 11 attacks in 2001, airing in September 2003 and the last two episodes premiered in September 2026.

No.	Title	Directed by	Written by	Original release date
1	"The Country and the City (1609–1825)"	Ric Burns	Ric Burns & James Sanders	November 14, 1999
This dramatic and lyrical first episode chronicles the rise of New York from its settlement by the Dutch in the early 17th century through the explosion of commercial growth sparked by the completion of the Erie Canal in 1825. Beginning with a consideration of themes to be explored throughout the entire series, the episode goes on to treat five crucial chapters in New York's fascinating early history: the defining role the Dutch played in establishing the city's character, the impact of the British empire, New York's strange sea fateful role in the American Revolution, its brief tenure as the nation's capital, and the extraordinary burst of entrepreneurial energy that in the early 19th century launched it on its course to becoming the greatest city on earth.
2	"Order and Disorder (1825–1865)"	Ric Burns	Ric Burns & James Sanders	November 15, 1999
The second episode chronicles the rise of New York from merchant city to industrial metropolis as the commercial revolution triggered by the Erie Canal transforms every aspect of life in the city. As the immigrant population exploded and social problems of every kind emerge on the streets of Manhattan, the outlines of a modern mass metropolis begin to appear—including imaginative visions of the city's future, from Walt Whitman's "Leaves of Grass" to Frederick Law Olmsted's Central Park. By 1860, every tension in America can be felt on the streets of New York, now the most powerful—and divided—city in the nation. The episode comes to a stunning climax during the Civi War, as the worst civil disturbance in the nation's history breaks out in New York: the catastrophic Draft Riots of 1863.
3	"Sunshine and Shadow (1865–1898)"	Ric Burns	Ric Burns & James Sanders	November 16, 1999
The Gilded Age following the Civil War saw the rise of the robber barons and the schism between wealth and poverty widen dramatically. The political life of the city, exemplified by William M. Tweed and Tammany Hall descended into total corruption. As the turn of the century dawned, New York City annexes Brooklyn, Queens, the Bronx, and Staten Island.
4	"The Power and the People (1898–1918)"	Ric Burns	Ric Burns & James Sanders	November 17, 1999
As the city starts building the skyscrapers that would make its skyline iconic, 10 million immigrants arrive in New York. The immigrants lived in frequently squalid conditions and worked in the city's most undesirable jobs. In 1911, when 146 female Jewish and Italian immigrants died in the Triangle Shirtwaist Factory fire, the city was largely unified in the successful demand for legislation on new factory safety reforms and labor laws.
5	"Cosmopolis (1918–1931)"	Ric Burns	Ron Blumer, Ric Burns & James Sanders	November 18, 1999
Following World War I, Manhattan becomes the cultural capital of the world, serving as the home to the brand new industries of radio broadcasting, magazines, advertising and public relations. Major cultural contributions were made by F. Scott Fitzgerald, George Gershwin, Duke Ellington and Louis Armstrong, and the Harlem Renaissance was the banner under which an explosion of African American culture and creativity lived. As the Great Depression dawned, the Chrysler Building and Empire State Building were completed.
6	"City of Tomorrow (1929–1945)"	Ric Burns	Ric Burns & James Sanders	September 30, 2001
The sixth episode chronicles the dramatic and increasingly fateful events following the crash of 1929—as the greatest depression in American history plunged the city and nation into economic gloom. In little more than ten years, immense new forces were unleashed in New York, as two of the most remarkable New Yorkers of all time came to the fore—Fiorello La Guardia and Robert Moses—attempting to create in the markets of times a bold new city of the future. Charting the demise of Mayor Jimmy Walker and the ascendancy of Franklin Delano Roosevelt; the complex impact of the automobile on the city; and the immense public works projects that permanently altered the landscape.
7	"The City and the World (1945–1975)"	Ric Burns	Ric Burns & James Sanders	October 1, 2001
In the aftermath of World War II, New York City emerged as the most populous and economically powerful city in the world. International organizations such as the United Nations and major American corporations established their headquarters in the city, fueling a major building boom. Southern African Americans and Puerto Rican migrants arrived in large numbers, reshaping the city’s population over the following decades. Robert Moses pursued an ambitious campaign of urban renewal, including the construction of new highways that transformed neighborhoods and contributed to white flight to the suburbs. The demolition of the old Penn Station in 1963 and opposition to Moses's proposed Lower Manhattan Expressway helped spur the creation of the New York City Landmarks Preservation Commission, protecting many of the city’s most architecturally significant buildings and neighborhoods. By the 1960s and 1970s, mounting social and economic challenges took an increasing toll on the city, culminating in New York City's 1975 fiscal crisis.
8	"The Center of the World (1946–2001)"	Ric Burns	Ric Burns & James Sanders	September 8, 2003
Tells the story of the rise and fall of the World Trade Center, from its origins in 1946 as a vision to promote global trade and revitalize Lower Manhattan, as businesses increasingly moved to Midtown, through the planning and construction of the Twin Towers and their emergence as symbols of New York’s global importance. The episode culminates with their destruction in the September 11, 2001 terrorist attacks.
9	"Shadows of the Past (1965–2001)"	Ric Burns	Ric Burns & James Sanders	September 21, 2026
Chronicles New York’s turbulent journey from the 1960s through the summer of 2001. The Hart-Celler Act reshaped the city through new waves of immigration, while Stonewall, the birth of hip-hop, the 1977 blackout, rising crime, the crack epidemic, and the AIDS crisis defined decades of upheaval. In the 1990s, falling crime due to CompStat, economic growth, redevelopment, and continued immigration fueled a dramatic revival, restoring New York as a thriving global city just before 9/11.
10	"The Future of Cities (2001–2026)"	Ric Burns	Ric Burns & James Sanders	September 22, 2026
Follows New York City’s recovery after 9/11 through the Bloomberg era, the 2008 financial crisis, Superstorm Sandy, and the COVID-19 pandemic, while exploring the city’s dramatic economic, physical, and demographic transformation and its continued ability to reinvent itself, ending with the inauguration of Zohran Mamdani as mayor in January 2026.

== Reception ==
=== Critical response ===
The original seven-part series was nominated for two Emmy Awards in 2000, for "Outstanding Achievement in Non-Fiction Programming - Cinematography" and "Outstanding Non-Fiction Series." In addition, Episode Five: Cosmopolis (1919–1931) won an Emmy for "Outstanding Achievement in Non-Fiction Programming - Picture Editing." Also in 2001, the five-part series won an Alfred I. duPont–Columbia University Award (Silver Baton) for excellence in broadcast journalism. In 2004, the newly completed Episode Eight: The Center of the World (1946–2003) was nominated for a News & Documentary Emmy in the "Outstanding Individual Achievement in a Craft: Music and Sound" category.

The film was well received by critics. In a 1999 review of the first five parts, Caryn James of The New York Times commended the film for its rich visuals, consistent theme, and compelling descriptions of class and racial tensions, especially in the second half of the series. James also criticized the film, however, writing, "Stunning though New York often is, its indulgent length and pace tests the patience of even its most serious-minded viewers."

Caryn James also reviewed the two new episodes released in late September 2001. She found them stronger than the previous five, with more focus and brevity. She also commented on the timeliness of their release following the September 11th attacks, finding the stories of the city's recovery from past disasters reassuring and full of accidental, yet profound meanings. A September 2003 review of the eighth episode in the series, by Alessandra Stanley of The New York Times, found it full of "intelligent insights and incomparable images," but ultimately, "too much, too late," like the World Trade Center itself.

Frank Rich of The New York Times referred to Episode 8 as, ""... a beautifully realized documentary in which we watch in painstaking detail the building of the World Trade Center from its inception so that we might then experience afresh the violence of its sudden destruction."

=== Viewership ===
Popular audiences also displayed high interest for the film, with the first five parts alone attracting more than 20 million viewers.

== Home media ==
This VHS is released November 23, 1999, 2 VHS and DVD on September 25, 2001, and Episode 8 on VHS and DVD on September 30, 2003.

== See also ==
- History of New York City
