= Andy Warhol: A Documentary Film =

- Written by: James Sanders; Ric Burns
- Directed by: Ric Burns
- Theme music composer: Brian Keane
- Original language: English

Production
- Producers: Peter M. Brant; Donald Rosenfeld; Daniel Wolf; Ric Burns
- Cinematography: Buddy Squires; Peter Nelson; Allen Moore; Michael Chin; Don Lenzer
- Editors: Li-Shin Yu; Juliana Parroni
- Running time: 4 hours

Original release
- Network: PBS
- Release: September 20 – September 21, 2006

Andy Warhol: A Documentary Film is a four-hour 2006 documentary by Ric Burns about pop artist Andy Warhol.

The film is Burns' cinematic argument that Warhol was the greatest artist of the second half of the 20th century. (Picasso is credited with having that honor in the first half of the 20th century.)

Laurie Anderson narrates the movie.

In one segment, Burns compares Warhol's portraits of such celebrities as Marilyn Monroe and Elizabeth Taylor with the icons of saints that Warhol saw in his boyhood Byzantine Catholic parish, where he spent many hours as a child.

Burns follows Warhol through his meteoric rise in New York's commercial art world during the 1950s. Burns cites 1962, the year Warhol first exhibited his soup can paintings in Los Angeles, as the turning point in Warhol's career.

Burns also describes in detail the attempted assassination of Warhol by Valerie Solanas in 1968.

Andy Warhol: A Documentary Film debuted in early September 2006 with a two-week theatrical run in New York City at Film Forum that charged no admission. The movie was televised in the United States over two nights, September 20–21, 2006, on PBS as part of its American Masters series.

The film won a 2006 Peabody Award.
