= The Warriors of Qiugang =

2010 film by Ruby Yang

- Film poster
- Directed by: Ruby Yang
- Written by: Thomas Lennon
- Produced by: Thomas Lennon; Ruby Yang
- Cinematography: Guan Xin
- Music by: Brian Keane
- Production company: Thomas Lennon Films
- Distributed by: Yale Environment 360
- Release date: September 17, 2010
- Running time: 39 minutes
- Country: United States
- Language: Mandarin

The Warriors of Qiugang (simplified Chinese: 仇岗卫士; traditional Chinese: 仇崗衛士; pinyin: Qiúgǎng Wèishì) is a 39-minute documentary film that chronicles the story of the Chinese village of Qiugang (pop. 1,900 in ca. 2010), in the suburbs of Bengbu City in Anhui Province in central-eastern China. It tells how a group of Chinese villagers put an end to the poisoning of their land and water by three chemical plants, the worst being Jiucailuo Chemical. It was directed and produced by Oscar winners Ruby Yang and Thomas Lennon, respectively. Guan Xin was the field producer and cinematographer. The film was nominated for an Academy Award for Best Documentary Short but lost to Strangers No More.

== Plot ==
The film opens to a shot of a large polluting factory which appears to be outdated. A local resident details how members of his village are saddened by the transformation and pollution of their home. Government officials and wealthy businessmen have forced their village to be home to several polluting plants, including the largest Jiucailuo Chemical.

Local environmental advocates from Green Anhui interview local residents about environmental impact. They identify that while everyone wants a cleaner environment, no one wants to be the first to act. Local residents experience high rates of cancer and local grains must be grown in polluted fields. Fish populations have diminished because of polluted waterways.

Residents claim local officials and inspectors are bribed or intentionally mislead during inspections including by shutting down production, releasing clean water before inspections, covering up pollution sites, and releasing pollution during nighttime hours. Village heads are receiving funds from company executives and this has led to hesitation among local residents to speak up. Some residences have filed legal suits against the chemical companies, however, they have failed. Most residents do not know how to read and write and lack the funds to bring forward any serious suit. One resident identified as Zhang Gongli has taught himself Chinese law and sued in 2004 and 2005 and lost both times.

40 local school children wrote to the environmental protection bureau and made national headlines when their essays were published in the papers. Officials then ordered plants to clean their waste before resuming production. While environmental laws exist in China, most of their enforcement is left to local agencies, meaning that they are poorly enforced. Residents claim alerting inspection officers can lead to their own arrest.

Village elders gather residents to sign petitions for the relocation of the plants. 1801 out of 1876 residents sign the petition. During the circulation of the petition, death threats were made against leaders in the community. However, these petitions still failed at the local level. Zhang and a member of Green Anhui venture to Beijing to file a petition with national officials. While in Beijing we hear from other local villagers who are subject to the same threats and legal failures as Zhang.

After returning, we learn that Zhang's trip has increased pressure from Beijing and a local chemical plant representative promises that the factory's ways are changing and new parts are on the way. Zhang still continued to find other violations. However, the local government is seen giving full permissions to the factory to begin production, leading to another protest and altercation. The villages remained steadfast to their movement and in 2008 TV crews and journalists publicized the factory's wrongdoings. Water and power are shut off to the plants and Jiucailuo Chemical is forced to relocate to an industrial park. While the environment has recovered, still long-lasting effects remain. Each villager plans to sue Jiucailuo Chemical to clean up their mess.

== Production Members ==
Director	Ruby Yang
Writer	Thomas Lennon
Producers	Ruby Yang, Thomas Lennon
Animations and Graphics	Frog Cui
Music	Brian Keane
Cinematography	Guan Xin
Film Editing	Ruby Yang
Researcher	Agai Cao

== Background ==
Over the last few decades, China's pollution has been a major global concern. This film focuses solely on environmental pollution in a single village and the devastating effects it has had on the local populous. The documentary was made over a period of three years from 2007-2010. A small pesticide factory first moved to Qiugang in the 1970s and was state-owned. Privately owned chemical plants appeared in Qiugang in 2004 to produce pesticides and dyes. One such chemical is o-Anisidine, a colorless carcinogenic, respiratory, and skin irritant used in dyes. Pollution in Qiugang has spread to major Chinese rivers such as the Huai River. The Jiucailuo Chemical plant occupies about a third of Qiugang.

In 2003, while the factory was state-owned, local residents protested the plant because of its pollution and were attacked and beaten. Armed men dispersed the escalating situation and terrorized the village.
