= Death and the Civil War =

2012 documentary film by Ric Burns

- Based on: This Republic of Suffering by Drew Faust
- Written by: Ric Burns, Drew Faust
- Directed by: Ric Burns
- Country of origin: United States

Original release
- Network: PBS
- Release: 2012

Death and the Civil War is a 2012 documentary film by Ric Burns. It was aired as an episode of American Experience on PBS.

The film was inspired by the book This Republic of Suffering by Drew Faust.

== Cast ==
- James Cromwell
- Keith David
- Gene Jones
- Josh Hamilton
- Robert Sean Leonard
- Amy Madigan
- Elizabeth Marvel
- Aleksa Palladino
