= Oliver Sacks: His Own Life =

2019 American documentary film by Ric Burns

- Theatrical release poster
- Directed by: Ric Burns
- Based on: His Own Life by Oliver Sacks
- Produced by: Bonnie Lafave; Kathryn Clinard; Leigh Howell
- Starring: Oliver Sacks; Roberto Calasso; Kate Edgar; Atul Gawande; Shane Fistell
- Cinematography: Buddy Squires
- Music by: Brian Keane
- Production company: Zeitgeist Films
- Release date: 13 August 2019 (Telluride)
- Running time: 111 minutes
- Country: United States
- Language: English

Oliver Sacks: His Own Life is a 2019 American biographical documentary film directed and created by Ric Burns about Oliver Sacks, a British neurologist and science historian, based on his autobiography, His Own Life. Produced by Zeitgeist Films, the film contains extensive interviews with Sacks and features commentary from friends and colleagues such as his publisher Roberto Calasso, his editor Kate Edgar, writer and doctor Atul Gawande and artist Shane Fistell. Sacks discusses his professional life and his personal difficulties such as substance abuse and internalized homophobia. The book, titled On the Move: A Life, was published six to seven months before his end-stage terminal cancer was diagnosed.

The film initially premiered in 2019 at the Telluride Film Festival, and had its general release on September 23, 2020, having been delayed due to the COVID-19 pandemic.
