= The Blood of Yingzhou District =

The Blood of Yingzhou District 《潁州的孩子》
- Film poster
- Directed by: Ruby Yang
- Produced by: Thomas F. Lennon
- Cinematography: Qu Jiang Tao
- Edited by: Ruby Yang; Ma Man Chung
- Production companies: Thomas Lennon Films; China AIDS Media Project
- Distributed by: Cinema Guild
- Release date: 2006
- Running time: 39 minutes
- Countries: United States; China
- Languages: English; Mandarin

The Blood of Yingzhou District (simplified Chinese: 颍州的孩子; traditional Chinese: 潁州的孩子; pinyin: Yǐngzhōu de Háizi; translation: The Children of Yingzhou) is a 2006 short film documentary directed by Ruby Yang and produced by Thomas F. Lennon. The film is about the effect of AIDS on orphans in Yingzhou District of Fuyang, Anhui, China. It won the 2007 Academy Award for Best Documentary (Short Subject).

The film documents the plight of young orphans in Anhui whose parents have died after contracting AIDS as a result of infection while donating blood to earn income and who sometimes do not receive care in their village since many people in the villages are terrified that they may be infected as a result of contact with the children.

== Background ==
In June 1985, the first case of AIDS was reported in China. At first, the disease was largely considered a disease of foreigners since most of the people diagnosed from 1985 to 1988 were either foreigners or Chinese people who had recently been overseas. The Chinese government took quick action by immediately banning all import of blood products. However, this action did not have the desired effect since AIDS continued to spread throughout China. From 1988 to 1993 most of those being diagnosed were intravenous drug users, and it was also common for new cases to be in the Yunnan among sex workers, people seeking treatment for sexually transmitted diseases, and Chinese people who had been employed abroad. Unfortunately, by 1998 AIDS had spread beyond coastal cities and Yunnan to all the regions of China.

=== AIDS in the Henan Province ===
In the 1950s, the Chinese government established a blood donation system in the Henan Province. This system helped the government since it allowed the government to create revenue for rural health care, and in the 1990s the system helped them deal with a financial shortfall by encouraging villagers to sell blood and plasma for profit. This was a very attractive deal to the villagers since they did not believe the blood-selling process to be dangerous or exhausting, so it seemed like easy money that these poverty-ridden Chinese people could not let pass by. This also seemed like easy money to the government since it had to spend close to nothing on infrastructure and labor. The stated purpose of the Henan government was to establish a ‘blood economy’ in order to ‘shake off poverty and attain prosperity’ and ‘make people rich and the nation strong.’ Nevertheless, this seemingly perfect deal soon began to show its down side. Greed took over and caused the desire for profits from blood products to be regarded as more important than safe blood and plasma donation practices. One of the most common unsafe practices included allowing the villagers to donate plasma multiple times in a day to attempt to maximize their profits even though it is recommended that people donate plasma once every two weeks at most. Another extremely common unsafe practice at the blood donation centers was the pooling of blood donated by all individuals in order to extract the plasma before injecting the pooled blood back into the donor. Moreover, these stations did not stress the importance of sterilizing materials used in the process of blood donation. These unsafe practices caused the risk of contracting AIDS to increase dramatically among those who made blood donation a common practice. In January 1995, healthcare workers identified the first cases of AIDS in the Henan region and rapidly linked the development to the increase in blood-selling practices. However, the Henan government refused to accept this fact, and they asserted that there was no AIDS in their province. Unrecognized, the disease continued to spread among the people of the Henan Province until, in 2000, there were so many cases reported that the government could no longer hide the presence of AIDS in the province. It is estimated that by that time, 500,000 to 700,000 people in the region had contracted AIDS because of the unsafe practices of the ‘blood economy.’

== Cinematographic response to AIDS epidemic ==
The Blood of Yingzhou District was released in 2006 and directed by Ruby Yang, a Hong Kong director. Through this documentary, Yang intended to communicate to the rest of China and the international community the struggle of orphans in the Anhui Province who had lost all support simply because their parents had been diagnosed with AIDS. Yang also released a documentary later on called The Blood of Yingzhou District Revisited, which showcased the lives of the same children in The Blood of Yingzhou District some years later and allowed people to see their development and how growing understanding of AIDS helped improve their lives over the years. Additional cinematographic responses include Love For Life, a movie released in 2011 directed by Gu Changwei. A documentary that goes along with this movie as a sort of behind-the-scenes look into the lives of the actors in the movie who are carriers of AIDS was also filmed; the name of this documentary is Together, and it was directed by Zhao Liang (director) and released in 2012.

== Reception ==
This documentary follows the daily lives of various orphans from the Anhui Province who lost their parents to AIDS. These young kids have been mostly abandoned by their relatives and the village as a whole. The documentary showcases the lonely lives these children have been living since the death of their parents simply because of a stigma against AIDS. These children are rejected and marginalized even though they themselves do not have the disease because of the ignorance of those around them. The documentary communicates the importance of awareness because it is demonstrated that the children's parents contracted the disease because of a lack of education on how to prevent the disease from spreading, and the children are shown to have fallen victim to ignorance as well because if the village or their relatives had been better educated, they would have received much more needed help earlier on. Towards the end of the documentary, an improvement in these children's lives is seen as they become part of a new family and are taken under the wing of a developing organization that aims to help victims of AIDS.

=== Impact on the fight against HIV/AIDS ===
The moving images of the children from the Anhui Province who had been affected by the spread of AIDS, has inspired several charities and non-governmental organizations to step in. In many cases, such organizations have aided in the spread of awareness about the nature of the ways in which HIV/AIDS is spread and how people should approach and treat the disease as well as those who have it. In addition, such organizations have helped provide opportunities to marginalized victims of AIDS by creating educational programs and by helping them find job opportunities. These efforts have improved the lives of victims of AIDS since possessing this misunderstood disease prevented them from being accepted among peers at school or by potential employers. Yang allows the public to have an inside look into the effects of the organizations' activism in The Blood of Yingzhou District Revisited. The results are promising, but there is still much work to be done to prevent further spread of the disease and to ensure victims can lead normal lives.

== See also ==
- List of American films of 2006
- HIV/AIDS in the People's Republic of China
- Plasma Economy
