= List of American Experience episodes =

American Experience, originally titled The American Experience, is an American television program and a PBS documentary series created by Peter McGhee. The series airs documentaries about significant historical events or figures in United States history. The show is produced primarily by WGBH-TV, a television station and PBS affiliate located in Boston, Massachusetts. WGBH-TV creates non-commercial educational programs and distributes them on public television stations throughout the United States. However, other PBS affiliate stations, such as WNET in New York City, have co-produced episodes for the television series. Since the program's debut on October 4, 1988, American Experience has broadcast 387 new episodes and has been a recipient of over 265 broadcast and web awards.

== Series overview ==
Season	Episodes	Originally released	
Season	Episodes	First released	Last released
1	16	October 4, 1988	January 17, 1989
2	15	October 3, 1989	February 12, 1990
3	12	October 1, 1990	May 6, 1991
4	12	September 30, 1991	February 17, 1992
5	15	September 20, 1992	March 1, 1993
6	7	October 27, 1993	May 25, 1994
7	9	October 11, 1994	May 9, 1995
8	9	October 16, 1995	February 26, 1996
9	9	October 6, 1996	July 28, 1997
10	18	October 5, 1997	March 2, 1998
11	13	November 18, 1998	May 17, 1999
12	15	November 14, 1999	May 23, 2000
13	13	October 17, 2000	April 30, 2001
14	14	September 30, 2001	May 12, 2002
15	13	November 11, 2002	July 14, 2003
16	9	September 8, 2003	May 3, 2004
17	12	October 4, 2004	July 4, 2005
18	13	October 17, 2005	May 22, 2006
19	18	October 2, 2006	May 14, 2007
20	18	January 14, 2008	May 6, 2008
21	10	January 26, 2009	May 18, 2009
22	8	November 2, 2009	May 10, 2010
23	12	October 11, 2010	May 16, 2011
24	7	January 10, 2012	May 1, 2012
25	6	September 18, 2012	February 5, 2013
26	9	October 29, 2013	June 24, 2014
27	8	November 18, 2014	July 14, 2015
28	10	September 14, 2015	August 2, 2016
29	10	October 18, 2016	April 12, 2017
30	6	January 9, 2018	October 16, 2018
31	9	January 15, 2019	September 10, 2019
32	9	January 6, 2020	July 7, 2020
33	5	January 11, 2021	September 28, 2021
34	7	February 7, 2022	November 15, 2022
35	8	January 3, 2023	October 30, 2023
36	7	January 23, 2024	November 30, 2024
37	8	February 25, 2025	January 6, 2026

== Episodes ==
=== Season 1 (1988–89) ===
No. overall	No. in season	Title	Directed by	Categories	Original release date
1	1	"The Great San Francisco Earthquake"	Tom Weidlinger	The Natural Environment	October 4, 1988
2	2	"Radio Bikini"	Robert Stone	Technology, War	October 11, 1988
3	3	"Indians, Outlaws, and Angie Debo"	Martha Sandlin	Biographies, Native American History	October 18, 1988
4	4	"Eric Sevareid's Not So Wild a Dream" (Note: The film episode Eric Sevareid's Not So Wild a Dream is sometimes listed in news reports as Eric Sevareid: Not So Wild a Dream or as Eric Sevareid's "Not So Wild a Dream".)	Frank J. DeMeo & Anthony Potter	Biographies	October 25, 1988
5	5	"The Life and Times of Rosie the Riveter"	Connie Field	Popular Culture, War	November 1, 1988
6	6	"Do You Mean There Are Still Real Cowboys?"	Jon Blair	Popular Culture, The American West	November 8, 1988
7	7	"Kennedy vs. Wallace: A Crisis Up Close"	Robert Drew	Civil Rights, Politics	November 15, 1988
8	8	"Geronimo and the Apache Resistance"	Neil Goodwin	Native American History	November 22, 1988
9	9	"Let Us Now Praise Famous Men: Revisited"	Carol Bell	Popular Culture	November 29, 1988
10	10	"That Rhythm, Those Blues"	George T. Nierenberg	Civil Rights, Popular Culture	December 6, 1988
11	11	"The Radio Priest"	Irv Drasnin	Popular Culture	December 13, 1988
12	12	"Hearts and Hands"	Pat Ferrero	Biographies	December 20, 1988
13	13	"Views of a Vanishing Frontier"	Craig B. Fisher	Native American History, The Natural Environment	December 27, 1988
14	14	"Eudora Welty: One Writer's Beginnings"	Patchy Wheatley	Biographies	January 3, 1989
15	15	"The World That Moses Built"	Edward Gray & Mark Obenhaus	Biographies, Technology	January 10, 1989
16	16	"Sins of Our Mothers"	Matthew Collins	Biographies	January 17, 1989

=== Season 2 (1989–90) ===
No. overall	No. in season	Title	Directed by	Categories	Original release date
17	1	"The Great Air Race of 1924"	David Grubin	Technology	October 3, 1989
18	2	"Demon Rum"	Thomas Lennon	Popular Culture	October 10, 1989
19	3	"A Family Gathering"	Lise Yasui	Biographies, Popular Culture	October 17, 1989
20	4	"The Great War: 1918"	Tom Weidlinger	War	October 31, 1989
21	5	"Forever Baseball"	Irv Drasnin	Popular Culture	November 7, 1989
22	6	"Mr. Sears' Catalogue"	Edward Gray & Mark Obenhaus	Biographies	November 14, 1989
23	7	"Yosemite: The Fate of Heaven"	Jon Else	Native American History, The Natural Environment	November 21, 1989
24	8	"Adam Clayton Powell"	Richard Kilberg	Biographies, Civil Rights, Politics	November 28, 1989
25	9	"Journey to America"	Charles Guggenheim	Popular Culture	December 5, 1989
26	10	"Ballad of a Mountain Man"	David Hoffman	Biographies, Popular Culture	December 12, 1989
27	11	"Ida B. Wells: A Passion for Justice"	William Greaves	Biographies, Civil Rights	December 19, 1989
28	12	"Orphans of the Storm"	Gill Barnes	War	December 26, 1989
29	13	"Forbidden City, USA"	Arthur Dong	Popular Culture	January 2, 1990
30	14	"Battle for Wilderness"	Diane Garey & Lawrence Hott	The American West, The Natural Environment	January 9, 1990
31	15	"Roots of Resistance: The Story of the Underground Railroad"	Orlando Bagwell	Civil Rights	January 16, 1990

=== Season 3 (1990–91) ===
* Denotes multiple chapters that aired on the same date and share the same episode number

No. overall	No. in season	Title	Directed by	Categories	Original release date
32	1	"Lindbergh"	Stephen Ives	Biographies, Popular Culture	October 1, 1990
33	2*	"Nixon (Parts 1–3)"	David Espar (Part 1), Elizabeth Deane (Part 2) & Marilyn H. Mellowes (Part 3)	Biographies, Politics, Presidents	October 15, 1990
34	3	"God Bless America and Poland, Too"	Marian Marzynski	Biographies	October 22, 1990
35	4	"Insanity on Trial"	Matthew Collins	Biographies, Politics	October 29, 1990
36	5	"The Satellite Sky"	Robert Stone	Technology	November 5, 1990
37	6	"The Crash of 1929"	Ellen Hovde & Muffie Meyer	Popular Culture	November 19, 1990
38	7	"The Iron Road"	Neil Goodwin	Technology, The American West	November 26, 1990
39	8	"French Dance Tonight"	Les Blank & Chris Strachwitz	Popular Culture	December 10, 1990
40	9	"Wildcatter: A Story of Texas Oil"	Robert Tranchin	Technology	December 17, 1990
41	10	"After the Crash"	Eric Neudel	Politics	January 7, 1991
42	11	"Los Mineros"	Hector Galan	Civil Rights	January 28, 1991
43	12	"Coney Island"	Ric Burns	Popular Culture, Technology	February 4, 1991

=== Season 4 (1991–92) ===
* Denotes multiple chapters that aired on the same date and share the same episode number

No. overall	No. in season	Title	Directed by	Categories	Original release date
44	1*	"LBJ (Parts 1–2)"	David Grubin	Biographies, Politics, Presidents, War	September 30, 1991
45	2*	"LBJ (Parts 3–4)"	David Grubin	Biographies, Politics, Presidents, War	October 1, 1991
46	3	"The Massachusetts 54th Colored Infantry"	Jacqueline Shearer	War	October 14, 1991
47	4	"Scandalous Mayor"	Ken Eluto	Biographies	October 28, 1991
48	5	"The Johnstown Flood"	Charles Guggenheim	The Natural Environment	November 4, 1991
49	6	"Pearl Harbor: Surprise and Remembrance"	Lance Bird, John Crowley & Tom Johnson	War	November 11, 1991
50	7	"G-Men: The Rise of J. Edgar Hoover"	Irv Drasnin	Popular Culture	November 18, 1991
51	8	"Duke Ellington: Reminiscing in Tempo"	Robert Levi	Biographies	December 9, 1991
52	9	"The Quiz Show Scandal"	Michael R. Lawrence	Popular Culture	January 6, 1992
53	10	"Love in the Cold War"	David Dugan & Eric Stange	War	January 13, 1992
54	11	"Wild by Law"	Diane Garey & Lawrence Hott	The Natural Environment	January 27, 1992
55	12	"Barnum's Big Top"	Matthew Collins	Biographies, Popular Culture	February 10, 1992
56	13	"In the White Man's Image"	Christine Lesiak	Native American History	February 17, 1992

=== Season 5 (1992–93) ===
No. overall	No. in season	Title	Directed by	Categories	Original release date
57	1	"The Kennedys (Part 1)"	James A. Devinney, David Espar, Marilyn H. Mellowes & Phillip Whitehead	Biographies, Politics, Presidents	September 20, 1992
58	2	"The Kennedys (Part 2)"	David Espar & James A. Devinney	Biographies, Politics, Presidents	September 21, 1992
59	3	"The Donner Party"	Ric Burns	The American West	October 28, 1992
— (Note: The film episode Liberators: Fighting on Two Fronts in World War II is not shown among an alphabetical listing of films on the American Experience series website. However, the film aired as an American Experience installment on November 11, 1992. WNET later refuted the claim that the racially segregated all-black 761st Tank Battalion and 183rd Engineer Combat Battalion liberated the Nazi death camps Dachau and Buchenwald in April 1945.)	4	"Liberators: Fighting on Two Fronts in World War II"	William Miles & Nina Rosenblum	—	November 11, 1992
60	5	"George Washington: The Man Who Wouldn't Be King"	David Sutherland	Biographies, Presidents	November 18, 1992
61	6	"Last Stand at Little Big Horn"	Paul Stekler	Native American History	November 25, 1992
62	7	"If You Knew Sousa"	Tom Spain	Popular Culture	December 9, 1992
63	8	"Simple Justice"	Helaine Head	Civil Rights	January 18, 1993
64	9	"Knute Rockne and His Fighting Irish"	Diane Garey & Lawrence Hott	Biographies	January 25, 1993
65	10	"Sit Down and Fight"	Charlotte Mitchell Zwerin	Biographies	February 1, 1993
66	11	"Rachel Carson's Silent Spring"	Neil Goodwin	The Natural Environment	February 8, 1993
67	12	"Goin' Back to T–Town"	Samuel D. Pollard & Joyce Vaughn	Biographies, Civil Rights	March 1, 1993

=== Season 6 (1993–94) ===
* Denotes multiple chapters that aired on the same date and share the same episode number

No. overall	No. in season	Title	Directed by	Categories	Original release date
68	1	"Amelia Earhart: The Price of Courage"	Nancy Porter	Biographies, Popular Culture	October 27, 1993
69	2	"The Hunt for Pancho Villa"	Hector Galan	Politics, War	November 3, 1993
70	3*	"Eisenhower (Parts 1–2)"	Adriana Bosch (Part 1) & Austin Hoyt (Part 2)	Biographies, Politics, Presidents	November 10, 1993
71	4	"The Hurricane of '38"	Michael Epstein & Thomas Lennon	The Natural Environment	November 17, 1993
72	5	"Ishi: The Last Yahi Indian"	Jed Riffe & Pamela Roberts	Biographies, Native American History	January 19, 1994
73	6	"Malcolm X: Make It Plain"	Orlando Bagwell	Biographies, Civil Rights	January 26, 1994
74	7	"America and the Holocaust"	Martin Ostrow	Politics, War	April 6, 1994
75	8	"D-Day"	Charles Guggenheim	War	May 25, 1994

=== Season 7 (1994–95) ===
* Denotes multiple chapters that aired on the same date and share the same episode number

No. overall	No. in season	Title	Directed by	Categories	Original release date
76	1*	"FDR (Parts 1–2)"	David Grubin	Biographies, Politics, Presidents, War	October 11, 1994
77	2*	"FDR (Parts 3–4)"	David Grubin	Biographies, Politics, Presidents, War	October 12, 1994
78	3	"Telegrams from the Dead"	Matthew Collins	Popular Culture	October 19, 1994
79	4	"Midnight Ramble"	Pearl Bowser & Bestor Cram	Civil Rights, Popular Culture	October 26, 1994
80	5	"Battle of the Bulge"	Thomas Lennon	War	November 9, 1994
81	6	"One Woman, One Vote"	Ruth Pollak	Biographies, Civil Rights	February 15, 1995
82	7*	"The Way West (Parts 1–2)"	Ric Burns	The American West	May 8, 1995
83	8*	"The Way West (Parts 3–4)"	Ric Burns	The American West	May 9, 1995

=== Season 8 (1995–96) ===
No. overall	No. in season	Title	Directed by	Categories	Original release date
84	1	"Murder of the Century"	Carl Charlson	Popular Culture	October 16, 1995
85	2	"Edison's Miracle of Light"	John Walter	Biographies, Technology	October 23, 1995
86	3	"Chicago 1968"	Chana Gazit	Politics, Popular Culture	November 13, 1995
87	4	"The Orphan Trains"	Janet Graham & Edward Gray	Popular Culture	November 27, 1995
88	5	"Freedom on My Mind"	Connie Field & Marilyn Mulford	Civil Rights	January 15, 1996
89	6	"Daley: The Last Boss"	Barak Goodman	Biographies, Politics	January 22, 1996
90	7	"The Battle Over Citizen Kane"	Michael Epstein & Thomas Lennon	Popular Culture	January 29, 1996
91	8	"The Wright Stuff"	Nancy Porter	Biographies, Technology	February 12, 1996
92	9	"Spy in the Sky"	Linda Garmon	Technology, War	February 26, 1996

=== Season 9 (1996–97) ===
* Denotes multiple chapters that aired on the same date and share the same episode number

No. overall	No. in season	Title	Directed by	Categories	Original release date
93	1	"TR, The Story of Theodore Roosevelt (Part 1)"	David Grubin	Biographies, Politics, Presidents	October 6, 1996
94	2	"TR, The Story of Theodore Roosevelt (Part 2)"	David Grubin	Biographies, Politics, Presidents	October 7, 1996
95	3	"The Richest Man in the World: Andrew Carnegie"	Austin Hoyt	Biographies	January 20, 1997
96	4	"Hawaii's Last Queen"	Vivian Ducat	Biographies	January 27, 1997
97	5	"The Telephone"	Karen Goodman & Kirk Simon	Technology	February 3, 1997
98	6	"Big Dream, Small Screen"	David Dugan	Technology	February 10, 1997
99	7	"New York Underground"	Elena Mannes	Technology	February 17, 1997
100	8	"Troublesome Creek: A Midwestern"	Steven Ascher & Jeanne Jordan	Biographies, Technology, The Natural Environment	April 14, 1997
101	9	"Around the World in 72 Days"	Christine Lesiak	Biographies, Popular Culture	April 28, 1997
102	10	"Gold Fever"	Susan Steinberg	The American West	May 12, 1997
103	11*	"Vietnam: A Television History (Parts 1–2)"	Judith Vecchione (Part 1); Elizabeth Deane (Part 2)	Politics, War	May 26, 1997
104	12	"Vietnam: A Television History (Part 3)"	Austin Hoyt	Politics, War	June 2, 1997
105	13	"Vietnam: A Television History (Part 4)"	Andrew Pearson	Politics, War	June 9, 1997
106	14	"Vietnam: A Television History (Part 5)"	Martin Smith	Politics, War	June 16, 1997
107	15	"Vietnam: A Television History (Part 6)"	Austin Hoyt	Politics, War	June 23, 1997
108	16	"Vietnam: A Television History (Part 7)"	Martin Smith	Politics, War	June 30, 1997
109	17	"Vietnam: A Television History (Part 8)"	Bruce Palling	Politics, War	July 7, 1997
110	18	"Vietnam: A Television History (Part 9)"	Martin Smith	Politics, War	July 14, 1997
111	19	"Vietnam: A Television History (Part 10)"	Elizabeth Deane	Politics, War	July 21, 1997
112	20	"Vietnam: A Television History (Part 11)"	Elizabeth Deane	Politics, War	July 28, 1997

=== Season 10 (1997–98) ===
No. overall	No. in season	Title	Directed by	Categories	Original release date
113	1	"Truman (Part 1)"	David Grubin	Biographies, Politics, Presidents, War	October 5, 1997
114	2	"Truman (Part 2)"	David Grubin	Biographies, Politics, Presidents, War	October 6, 1997
115	3	"A Midwife's Tale"	Richard P. Rogers	Biographies	January 19, 1998
116	4	"Mr. Miami Beach"	Mark Davis	Biographies	February 2, 1998
117	5	"Influenza 1918"	Robert Kenner	Technology	February 9, 1998
118	6	"Reagan (Part 1)"	Adriana Bosch	Biographies, Politics, Presidents	February 23, 1998
119	7	"Reagan (Part 2)"	Austin Hoyt	Biographies, Politics, Presidents	February 24, 1998
120	8	"Surviving the Dust Bowl"	Chana Gazit	The Natural Environment	March 2, 1998
121	9	"Riding the Rails"	Lexy Lovell & Michael Uys	Popular Culture	April 13, 1998

=== Season 11 (1998–99) ===
* Denotes multiple chapters that aired on the same date and share the same episode number

No. overall	No. in season	Title	Directed by	Categories	Original release date
122	1*	"America 1900 (Parts 1–4)"	David Grubin	Politics, Popular Culture, Technology	November 18, 1998
123	2	"Race for the Superbomb"	Thomas Ott	Technology, War	January 11, 1999
124	3	"Hoover Dam"	Stephen Stept	Technology, The American West	January 18, 1999
125	4	"Alone on the Ice"	Nancy Porter	Biographies, Technology, The Natural Environment	February 8, 1999
126	5	"Rescue at Sea"	Ben Loeterman	Technology	February 15, 1999
127	6	"Meltdown at Three Mile Island"	Chana Gazit	Technology	February 22, 1999
128	7	"Lost in the Grand Canyon"	Mark Davis	Biographies, The American West, The Natural Environment	April 5, 1999
129	8	"MacArthur (Part 1)"	Sarah Holt & Austin Hoyt	Biographies, War	May 17, 1999
130	9	"MacArthur (Part 2)"	Sarah Holt & Austin Hoyt	Biographies, War	May 18, 1999
131	10	"Fly Girls"	Laurel Ladevich	Biographies, Technology, War	May 24, 1999

=== Season 12 (1999–2000) ===
No. overall	No. in season	Title	Directed by	Categories	Original release date
132	1	"New York: A Documentary Film (Part 1)"	Ric Burns	Popular Culture	November 14, 1999
133	2	"New York: A Documentary Film (Part 2)"	Ric Burns	Popular Culture	November 15, 1999
134	3	"New York: A Documentary Film (Part 3)"	Ric Burns	Popular Culture	November 16, 1999
135	4	"New York: A Documentary Film (Part 4)"	Ric Burns	Popular Culture	November 17, 1999
136	5	"New York: A Documentary Film (Part 5)"	Ric Burns	Popular Culture	November 18, 1999
137	6	"Eleanor Roosevelt"	Sue Williams	Biographies, Politics, Presidents	January 10, 2000
138	7	"Houdini"	Nancy Porter	Biographies, Popular Culture	January 24, 2000
139	8	"Nixon's China Game"	Mark Anderson & Michael Simkin	Biographies, Politics	January 31, 2000
140	9	"The Duel"	Carl Byker & Mitch Wilson	Politics	February 14, 2000
141	10	"John Brown's Holy War"	Robert Kenner	Biographies, Civil Rights	February 28, 2000
142	11	"George Wallace: Settin' the Woods on Fire (Part 1)"	Daniel McCabe & Paul Stekler	Biographies, Civil Rights, Politics	April 23, 2000
143	12	"George Wallace: Settin' the Woods on Fire (Part 2)"	Daniel McCabe & Paul Stekler	Biographies, Civil Rights, Politics	April 24, 2000
144	13	"Jubilee Singers: Sacrifice and Glory"	Llewellyn M. Smith	Civil Rights, Popular Culture	May 1, 2000
145	14	"Joe DiMaggio: The Hero's Life"	Mark Zwonitzer	Biographies, Popular Culture	May 8, 2000
146	15	"The Wizard of Photography"	James A. DeVinney	Biographies, Technology	May 22, 2000

=== Season 13 (2000–01) ===
* Denotes multiple chapters that aired on the same date and share the same episode number

No. overall	No. in season	Title	Directed by	Categories	Original release date
147	1	"The Rockefellers (Part 1)"	Elizabeth Deane	Biographies, Popular Culture	October 16, 2000
148	2	"The Rockefellers (Part 2)"	Adriana Bosch	Biographies, Popular Culture	October 23, 2000
149	3	"Secrets of a Master Builder"	Carl Charlson	Biographies, Technology	October 30, 2000
150	4	"Return with Honor"	Freida Lee Mock & Terry Sanders	Politics, War	November 13, 2000
151	5	"Streamliners: America's Lost Trains"	Thomas Ott	Technology	February 5, 2001
152	6	"Marcus Garvey: Look For Me in the Whirlwind"	Stanley Nelson	Biographies, Civil Rights, Politics	February 12, 2001
153	7*	"Abraham and Mary Lincoln: A House Divided (Parts 1–2)"	David Grubin	Biographies, Presidents	February 19, 2001
154	8*	"Abraham and Mary Lincoln: A House Divided (Parts 3–4)"	David Grubin	Biographies, Presidents	February 20, 2001
155	9*	"Abraham and Mary Lincoln: A House Divided (Parts 5–6)"	David Grubin	Biographies, Presidents	February 21, 2001
156	10	"Scottsboro: An American Tragedy"	Barak Goodman	Civil Rights	April 2, 2001
157	11	"Fatal Flood"	Chana Gazit	The Natural Environment	April 16, 2001
158	12	"Stephen Foster"	Randall MacLowry	Biographies, Popular Culture	April 23, 2001

=== Season 14 (2001–02) ===
No. overall	No. in season	Title	Directed by	Categories	Original release date
159	1	"New York: A Documentary Film (Part 6)"	Ric Burns	Popular Culture	September 30, 2001
160	2	"New York: A Documentary Film (Part 7)"	Ric Burns	Popular Culture	October 1, 2001
161	3	"War Letters"	Robert Kenner	War	November 11, 2001
162	4	"Woodrow Wilson (Part 1)"	Carl Byker & Mitch Wilson	Biographies, Presidents, War	January 6, 2002
163	5	"Woodrow Wilson (Part 2)"	Carl Byker & Mitch Wilson	Biographies, Presidents, War	January 13, 2002
164	6	"Mount Rushmore"	Mark Zwonitzer	The Natural Environment	January 20, 2002
165	7	"Miss America"	Lisa Ades	Popular Culture	January 27, 2002
166	8	"Zoot Suit Riots"	Joseph Tovares	Civil Rights, Politics	February 10, 2002
167	9	"Monkey Trial"	Christine Lesiak	Politics, Popular Culture	February 17, 2002
168	10	"Public Enemy #1"	Ben Loeterman	Biographies, Politics, Popular Culture	February 24, 2002
169	11	"Ansel Adams: A Documentary Film"	Ric Burns	Biographies, Popular Culture, The Natural Environment	April 21, 2002
170	12	"A Brilliant Madness"	Mark Samels	Biographies	April 28, 2002
171	13	"Ulysses S. Grant (Part 1)"	Adriana Bosch	Biographies, Politics, Popular Culture, Presidents, War	May 5, 2002
172	14	"Ulysses S. Grant (Part 2)"	Elizabeth Deane	Biographies, Politics, Popular Culture, Presidents, War	May 12, 2002

=== Season 15 (2002–03) ===
No. overall	No. in season	Title	Directed by	Categories	Original release date
173	1	"Jimmy Carter (Part 1)"	Adriana Bosch	Biographies, Politics, Presidents	November 11, 2002
174	2	"Jimmy Carter (Part 2)"	Adriana Bosch	Biographies, Politics, Presidents	November 12, 2002
175	3	"Chicago: City of the Century (Part 1)"	Austin Hoyt	Popular Culture	January 13, 2003
176	4	"Chicago: City of the Century (Part 2)"	Austin Hoyt	Popular Culture	January 14, 2003
177	5	"Chicago: City of the Century (Part 3)"	Austin Hoyt	Popular Culture	January 15, 2003
178	6	"The Murder of Emmett Till"	Stanley Nelson	Civil Rights, Politics	January 20, 2003
179	7	"The Transcontinental Railroad"	Michael Chin & Mark Zwonitzer	Technology, The American West	January 27, 2003
180	8	"Partners of the Heart"	Andrea Kalin	Biographies, Civil Rights, Technology	February 10, 2003
181	9	"The Pill"	Chana Gazit	Popular Culture, Technology	February 24, 2003
182	10	"Daughter from Danang"	Gail Dolgin & Vicente Franco	Biographies, War	April 7, 2003
183	11	"Seabiscuit"	Stephen Ives	Biographies, Popular Culture	April 21, 2003
184	12	"Bataan Rescue"	Peter Jones	War	July 7, 2003
185	13	"Murder at Harvard"	Eric Stange	Popular Culture	July 14, 2003

=== Season 16 (2003–04) ===
No. overall	No. in season	Title	Directed by	Categories	Original release date
186	1	"New York: A Documentary Film (Part 8)"	Ric Burns	Popular Culture, Technology	September 8, 2003
187	2	"Reconstruction: The Second Civil War (Part 1)"	Llewellyn M. Smith	Civil Rights, War	January 12, 2004
188	3	"Reconstruction: The Second Civil War (Part 2)"	Elizabeth Deane	Civil Rights, War	January 13, 2004
189	4	"Citizen King"	Orlando Bagwell & W. Noland Walker	Biographies, Civil Rights	January 19, 2004
190	5	"Remember the Alamo"	Joseph Tovares	The American West, War	February 2, 2004
191	6	"Tupperware!"	Laurie Kahn-Leavitt	Popular Culture	February 9, 2004
192	7	"Emma Goldman"	Mel Bucklin	Biographies, Politics	April 12, 2004
193	8	"Patriots Day"	Marian Marzynski	Popular Culture	April 19, 2004
194	9	"Golden Gate Bridge"	Ben Loeterman	Technology	May 3, 2004

=== Season 17 (2004–05) ===
No. overall	No. in season	Title	Directed by	Categories	Original release date
195	1	"RFK"	David Grubin	Biographies, Politics	October 4, 2004
196	2	"The Fight"	Barak Goodman	Biographies, Civil Rights, Popular Culture	October 18, 2004
197	3	"Fidel Castro"	Adriana Bosch	Biographies	January 31, 2005
198	4	"Building the Alaska Highway"	Tracy Heather Strain	Technology, War	February 7, 2005
199	5	"Kinsey"	Barak Goodman & John Maggio	Biographies, Popular Culture	February 14, 2005
200	6	"Mary Pickford"	Sue Williams	Biographies, Popular Culture	April 4, 2005
201	7	"The Great Transatlantic Cable"	Peter Jones	Technology	April 11, 2005
202	8	"The Massie Affair"	Mark Zwonitzer	Popular Culture	April 18, 2005
203	9	"Victory in the Pacific"	Austin Hoyt	War	May 2, 2005
204	10	"The Carter Family: Will the Circle Be Unbroken"	Kathy Conkwright	Biographies, Popular Culture	May 9, 2005
205	11	"Guerrilla: The Taking of Patty Hearst"	Robert Stone	Politics, Popular Culture	May 23, 2005

=== Season 18 (2005–06) ===
No. overall	No. in season	Title	Directed by	Categories	Original release date
206	1	"Two Days in October"	Robert Kenner	Politics, War	October 17, 2005
207	2	"Race to the Moon"	Kevin Michael Kertscher	Technology	October 31, 2005
208	3	"Las Vegas: An Unconventional History (Part 1)"	Stephen Ives	Popular Culture, The American West	November 14, 2005
209	4	"Las Vegas: An Unconventional History (Part 2)"	Stephen Ives	Popular Culture, The American West	November 15, 2005
210	5	"John & Abigail Adams"	Peter Jones	Biographies, Politics, Presidents	January 23, 2006
211	6	"The Nuremberg Trials"	Michael Kloft	Politics, War	January 30, 2006
212	7	"Jesse James"	Mark Zwonitzer	Biographies, Popular Culture	February 6, 2006
213	8	"Hijacked"	Ilan Ziv	Politics	February 27, 2006
214	9	"Eugene O'Neill"	Ric Burns	Biographies, Popular Culture	March 27, 2006
215	10	"The Boy in the Bubble"	Barak Goodman & John Maggio	Biographies, Technology	April 10, 2006
216	11	"The Alaska Pipeline"	Mark Davis	Technology, The Natural Environment	April 24, 2006
217	12	"Annie Oakley"	Riva Freifeld	Biographies, Popular Culture, The American West	May 8, 2006
218	13	"The Man Behind Hitler"	Lutz Hachmeister	Biographies, War	May 22, 2006

=== Season 19 (2006–07) ===
* Denotes multiple chapters that aired on the same date and share the same episode number

No. overall	No. in season	Title	Directed by	Categories	Original release date
219	1*	"Eyes on the Prize (Parts 1–2)"	Judith Vecchione (Parts 1–2)	Civil Rights	October 2, 2006
220	2*	"Eyes on the Prize (Parts 3–4)"	Orlando Bagwell (Part 3); Callie Crossley & James A. DeVinney (Part 4)	Civil Rights	October 9, 2006
221	3*	"Eyes on the Prize (Parts 5–6)"	Orlando Bagwell (Part 5); Callie Crossley & James A. DeVinney (Part 6)	Civil Rights	October 16, 2006
222	4	"Test Tube Babies"	Chana Gazit & Hilary Klotz Steinman	Technology	October 23, 2006
223	5	"The Great Fever"	Adriana Bosch & Michael Chin	Technology	October 30, 2006
224	6	"The Gold Rush"	Randall MacLowry	The American West	November 6, 2006
225	7	"The Berlin Airlift"	Peter Adler, Alexander Berkel & Stefan Mausbach	War	January 29, 2007
226	8	"The Living Weapon"	John Rubin	Technology, War	February 5, 2007
227	9	"New Orleans"	Stephen Ives	Popular Culture	February 12, 2007
228	10	"Sister Aimee"	Linda Garmon	Biographies, Popular Culture	April 2, 2007
229	11	"Jonestown: The Life and Death of Peoples Temple"	Stanley Nelson	Popular Culture	April 9, 2007
230	12	"Summer of Love"	Gail Dolgin & Vicente Franco	Popular Culture	April 23, 2007
231	13	"The Mormons (Part 1)"	Helen Whitney	Biographies, Popular Culture, The American West	April 30, 2007
232	14	"The Mormons (Part 2)"	Helen Whitney	Biographies, Popular Culture, The American West	May 1, 2007
233	15	"Alexander Hamilton"	Muffie Meyer	Biographies, Politics, Presidents	May 14, 2007

=== Season 20 (2008) ===
* Denotes multiple chapters that aired on the same date and share the same episode number

No. overall	No. in season	Title	Directed by	Categories	Original release date
234	1	"Oswald's Ghost"	Robert Stone	Biographies	January 14, 2008
235	2	"The Lobotomist"	Barak Goodman & John Maggio	Technology	January 21, 2008
236	3*	"Eyes on the Prize (Parts 7–8)"	James A. DeVinney & Madison D. Lacy Jr. (Part 7); Sheila C. Bernard & Samuel D. Pollard (Part 8)	Civil Rights	February 3, 2008
237	4	"Grand Central"	Michael Epstein	Popular Culture, Technology	February 4, 2008
238	5*	"Eyes on the Prize (Parts 9–10)"	Louis Massiah & Terry Kay Rockefeller (Part 9); Jacqueline Shearer & Paul Stekler (Part 10)	Civil Rights	February 10, 2008
239	6*	"Eyes on the Prize (Parts 11–12)"	Sheila C. Bernard & Samuel D. Pollard (Part 11); Louis Massiah, Thomas Ott & Terry Kay Rockefeller (Part 12)	Civil Rights	February 17, 2008
240	7	"Kit Carson"	Stephen Ives	Biographies, Native American History, The American West	February 18, 2008
241	8*	"Eyes on the Prize (Parts 13–14)"	Jacqueline Shearer & Paul Stekler (Part 13); James A. DeVinney & Madison D. Lacy (Part 14)	Civil Rights	February 24, 2008
242	9	"Buffalo Bill"	Rob Rapley	Biographies, Popular Culture, The American West	February 25, 2008
243	10	"Minik" "Minik, the Lost Eskimo"	Axel Engstfeld	Biographies	March 31, 2008
244	11	"Walt Whitman"	Mark Zwonitzer	Biographies, The Natural Environment	April 14, 2008
245	12	"Roberto Clemente"	Bernardo Ruiz	Biographies, Civil Rights, Popular Culture	April 21, 2008
246	13	"George H.W. Bush (Part 1)"	Austin Hoyt	Biographies, Politics, Presidents	May 5, 2008
247	14	"George H.W. Bush (Part 2)"	Austin Hoyt	Biographies, Politics, Presidents	May 6, 2008

=== Season 21 (2009) ===
No. overall	No. in season	Title	Directed by	Categories	Original release date
248	1	"The Trials of J. Robert Oppenheimer"	David Grubin	Biographies, Technology, War	January 26, 2009
249	2	"The Polio Crusade"	Sarah Colt	Popular Culture, Technology	February 2, 2009
250	3	"The Assassination of Abraham Lincoln"	Barak Goodman	Presidents	February 9, 2009
251	4	"A Class Apart"	Peter Miller & Carlos Sandoval	Civil Rights, Popular Culture	February 23, 2009
252	5	"We Shall Remain (Part 1)"	Chris Eyre	Civil Rights, Native American History, Politics, The American West	April 13, 2009
253	6	"We Shall Remain (Part 2)"	Ric Burns & Chris Eyre	Civil Rights, Native American History, Politics, The American West	April 20, 2009
254	7	"We Shall Remain (Part 3)"	Chris Eyre	Civil Rights, Native American History, Politics, The American West	April 27, 2009
255	8	"We Shall Remain (Part 4)"	Sarah Colt and Dustinn Craig	Civil Rights, Native American History, Politics, The American West	May 4, 2009
256	9	"We Shall Remain (Part 5)"	Stanley Nelson	Civil Rights, Native American History, Politics, The American West	May 11, 2009

=== Season 22 (2009–10) ===
No. overall	No. in season	Title	Directed by	Categories	Original release date
257	1	"The Civilian Conservation Corps"	Robert Stone	The American West, The Natural Environment	November 2, 2009
258	2	"Wyatt Earp"	Rob Rapley	Biographies, The American West	January 25, 2010
259	3	"The Bombing of Germany"	Zvi Dor-Ner	Politics, War	February 8, 2010
260	4	"Dolley Madison"	Muffie Meyer	Biographies, Politics, Presidents	March 1, 2010
261	5	"Earth Days"	Robert Stone	Popular Culture, The Natural Environment	April 19, 2010
262	6	"My Lai"	Barak Goodman	War	April 26, 2010
263	7	"Roads to Memphis"	Stephen Ives	Civil Rights	May 3, 2010
264	8	"Into the Deep: America, Whaling & the World"	Ric Burns	The Natural Environment	May 10, 2010

=== Season 23 (2010–11) ===
* Denotes multiple chapters that aired on the same date and share the same episode number

No. overall	No. in season	Title	Directed by	Categories	Original release date
265	1*	"God in America (Parts 1–2)"	David Belton	Popular Culture	October 11, 2010
266	2*	"God in America (Parts 3–4)"	Sarah Colt	Popular Culture	October 12, 2010
267	3*	"God in America (Parts 5–6)"	Greg Barker	Popular Culture	October 13, 2010
268	4	"Robert E. Lee"	Mark Zwonitzer	Biographies, War	January 3, 2011
269	5	"Dinosaur Wars"	Mark Davis	The American West, The Natural Environment	January 17, 2011
270	6	"Panama Canal"	Stephen Ives	Popular Culture, Technology, The Natural Environment	January 24, 2011
271	7	"The Greely Expedition"	Rob Rapley	Popular Culture, The Natural Environment	January 31, 2011
272	8	"Triangle Fire"	Jamila Wignot	Popular Culture, Technology	February 28, 2011
273	9	"The Great Famine"	Austin Hoyt & Aisiyuak Yumagulov	Popular Culture, The Natural Environment	April 11, 2011
274	10	"Stonewall Uprising"	Kate Davis & David Heilbroner	Civil Rights, Popular Culture	April 25, 2011
275	11	"Soundtrack for a Revolution"	Bill Guttentag & Dan Sturman	Civil Rights, Popular Culture	May 9, 2011
276	12	"Freedom Riders"	Stanley Nelson	Civil Rights, Popular Culture	May 16, 2011

=== Season 24 (2012) ===
No. overall	No. in season	Title	Directed by	Categories	Original release date
277	1	"Billy the Kid"	John Maggio	Biographies, The American West	January 10, 2012
278	2	"Custer's Last Stand"	Stephen Ives	Biographies, Native American History, The American West	January 17, 2012
279	3	"Clinton (Part 1)"	Barak Goodman	Biographies, Politics, Presidents	February 20, 2012
280	4	"Clinton (Part 2)"	Barak Goodman	Biographies, Politics, Presidents	February 21, 2012
281	5	"The Amish"	David Belton	Biographies, Popular Culture	February 28, 2012
282	6	"Grand Coulee Dam"	Stephen Ives	Native American History, Technology, The; American West, The Natural Environment	April 3, 2012
283	7	"Jesse Owens"	Laruens Grant	Biographies, Civil Rights, Popular Culture, War	May 1, 2012
284	8	"Death and the Civil War"	Ric Burns	Popular Culture, War	September 18, 2012

=== Season 25 (2013) ===
No. overall	No. in season	Title	Directed by	Categories	Original release date
285	1	"The Abolitionists (Part 1)"	Rob Rapley	Biographies, Civil Rights	January 8, 2013
286	2	"The Abolitionists (Part 2)"	Rob Rapley	Biographies, Civil Rights	January 15, 2013
287	3	"The Abolitionists (Part 3)"	Rob Rapley	Biographies, Civil Rights	January 22, 2013
288	4	"Henry Ford"	Sarah Colt	Biographies, Popular Culture	January 29, 2013
289	5	"Silicon Valley"	Randall MacLowry	Biographies, Popular Culture, Technology	February 5, 2013
290	6	"War of the Worlds"	Cathleen O'Connell	Popular Culture	October 29, 2013
291	7	"JFK (Part 1)"	Susan Bellows	Biographies, Politics, Presidents	November 11, 2013
292	8	"JFK (Part 2)"	Susan Bellows	Biographies, Politics, Presidents	November 12, 2013

=== Season 26 (2014) ===
No. overall	No. in season	Title	Directed by	Written by	Original release date
293	1	"The Poisoner's Handbook"	Rob Rapley	Teleplay by : Rob Rapley; Story by : Michelle Ferrari	January 7, 2014
294	2	"1964"	Stephen Ives	Stephen Ives	January 14, 2014
295	3	"The Amish: Shunned"	Callie T. Wiser	Callie T. Wiser	February 4, 2014
296	4	"Butch Cassidy and the Sundance Kid"	John Maggio	John Maggio	February 11, 2014
297	5	"The Rise and Fall of Penn Station"	Randall MacLowry	Randall MacLowry	February 18, 2014
298	6	"Freedom Summer"	Stanley Nelson	Stanley Nelson	June 24, 2014
299	7	"Cold War Roadshow"	Robert Stone & Tim B. Toidze	Unknown	November 18, 2014

=== Season 27 (2015) ===
No. overall	No. in season	Title	Directed by	Written by	Original release date
300	1	"Ripley: Believe It or Not"	Cathleen O'Connell	Cathleen O'Connell	January 6, 2015
301	2	"Klansville U.S.A."	Callie T. Wiser	Teleplay by : David Espar & Callie T. Wiser; Story by : Callie T. Wiser	January 13, 2015
302	3	"Edison"	Michelle Ferrari	Michelle Ferrari	January 27, 2015
303	4	"The Big Burn"	Stephen Ives	Stephen Ives	February 3, 2015
304	5	"The Forgotten Plague"	Chana Gazit	Chana Gazit	February 10, 2015
305	6	"Last Days in Vietnam"	Rory Kennedy	Mark Bailey & Keven McAlester	April 28, 2015
306	7	"Blackout"	Callie T. Wiser	Teleplay by : Sharon Grimberg; Story by : David Murdock	July 14, 2015
307	8	"Walt Disney (Part 1)"	Sarah Colt	Teleplay by : Mark Zwonitzer; Story by : Sarah Colt & Tom Jennings	September 14, 2015
308	9	"Walt Disney (Part 2)"	Sarah Colt	Teleplay by : Mark Zwonitzer; Story by : Sarah Colt & Tom Jennings	September 15, 2015
309	10	"American Comandante"	Adriana Bosch	Adriana Bosch	November 17, 2015
310	11	"The Pilgrims"	Ric Burns	Ric Burns	November 24, 2015

=== Season 28 (2016) ===
No. overall	No. in season	Title	Directed by	Written by	Original release date
311	1	"Bonnie & Clyde"	John Maggio	John Maggio	January 19, 2016
312	2	"The Mine Wars"	Randall MacLowry	Teleplay by : Mark Zwonitzer; Story by : Paul Taylor	January 26, 2016
313	3	"Murder of a President"	Rob Rapley	Teleplay by : Rob Rapley; Story by : Paul Taylor	February 2, 2016
314	4	"The Perfect Crime"	Cathleen O'Connell	Michelle Ferrari	February 9, 2016
315	5	"Space Men"	Amanda Pollak	Amanda Pollak	March 1, 2016
316	6	"The Boys of ’36"	Margaret Grossi	Aaron R. Cohen	August 2, 2016
317	7	"Tesla"	David Grubin	David Grubin	October 18, 2016
318	8	"The Battle of Chosin"	Randall MacLowry	Mark Zwonitzer	November 1, 2016

=== Season 29 (2017) ===
No. overall	No. in season	Title	Directed by	Written by	Original release date
319	1	"Command and Control"	Robert Kenner	Teleplay by : Robert Kenner & Eric Schlosser; Story by : Brian Pearle & Kim Roberts	January 10, 2017
320	2	"Rachel Carson"	Michelle Ferrari	Michelle Ferrari	January 24, 2017
321	3	"The Race Underground"	Michael Rossi	Michael Rossi	January 31, 2017
322	4	"Oklahoma City"	Barak Goodman	Barak Goodman	February 7, 2017
323	5	"Ruby Ridge"	Barak Goodman	Barak Goodman & Don Kleszy	February 14, 2017
324	6	"The Great War (Part 1)"	Stephen Ives	Stephen Ives	April 10, 2017
325	7	"The Great War (Part 2)"	Amanda Pollak	Stephen Ives	April 11, 2017
326	8	"The Great War (Part 3)"	Rob Rapley	Rob Rapley	April 12, 2017

=== Season 30 (2018) ===
No. overall	No. in season	Title	Directed by	Written by	Original release date
327	1	"Into the Amazon"	John Maggio	John Maggio	January 9, 2018
328	2	"The Secret of Tuxedo Park"	Rob Rapley	Rob Rapley	January 16, 2018
329	3	"The Gilded Age"	Sarah Colt	Mark Zwonitzer	February 6, 2018
330	4	"The Bombing of Wall Street"	Susan Bellows	Susan Bellows	February 13, 2018
331	5	"The Island Murder"	Mark Zwonitzer	Mark Zwonitzer	April 17, 2018
332	6	"The Chinese Exclusion Act"	Ric Burns & Li-Shin Yu	Teleplay by : Ric Burns; Story by : Ric Burns, Robin Espinola & Li-Shin Yu	May 29, 2018
333	7	"The Circus (Part 1)"	Sharon Grimberg	Sharon Grimberg	October 8, 2018
334	8	"The Circus (Part 2)"	Sharon Grimberg	Sharon Grimberg	October 9, 2018
335	9	"The Eugenics Crusade"	Michelle Ferrari	Michelle Ferrari	October 16, 2018

=== Season 31 (2019) ===
No. overall	No. in season	Title	Directed by	Written by	Original release date
336	1	"The Swamp"	Randall MacLowery	Teleplay by : Michelle Ferrari & Randall MacLowry; Story by : Randall MacLowry	January 15, 2019
337	2	"Sealab"	Stephen Ives	Stephen Ives	February 12, 2019
338	3	"Chasing the Moon (Part 1)"	Robert Stone	Robert Stone	July 8, 2019
339	4	"Chasing the Moon (Part 2)"	Robert Stone	Robert Stone	July 9, 2019
340	5	"Chasing the Moon (Part 3)"	Robert Stone	Robert Stone	July 10, 2019
341	6	"Woodstock"	Barak Goodman	Barak Goodman & Don Kleszy	August 6, 2019
342	7	"The Feud"	Randall MacLowry	Randall MacLowry	September 10, 2019

=== Season 32 (2020) ===
No. overall	No. in season	Title	Directed by	Written by	Original release date
343	1	"McCarthy"	Sharon Grimberg	Sharon Grimberg	January 6, 2020
344	2	"The Poison Squad"	John Maggio	John Maggio	January 28, 2020
345	3	"The Man Who Tried to Feed the World"	Rob Rapley	Rob Rapley	April 21, 2020
346	4	"George W. Bush (Part 1)"	Jamila Ephron	Chris Durrance & Barak Goodman	May 4, 2020
347	5	"George W. Bush (Part 2)"	Jamila Ephron	Chris Durrance & Barak Goodman	May 5, 2020
348	6	"Mr. Tornado"	Michael Rossi	Michael Rossi	May 19, 2020
349	7	"The Vote (Part 1)"	Michelle Ferrari	Michelle Ferrari	July 6, 2020
350	8	"The Vote (Part 2)"	Michelle Ferrari	Michelle Ferrari	July 7, 2020

=== Season 33 (2021) ===
No. overall	No. in season	Title	Directed by	Written by	Original release date
351	1	"The Codebreaker"	Chana Gazit	Chana Gazit	January 11, 2021
352	2	"Voice of Freedom"	Rob Rapley	Rob Rapley	February 15, 2021
353	3	"The Blinding of Isaac Woodard"	Jamila Ephron	Jamila Ephron & Mark Zwonitzer	March 30, 2021
354	4	"American Oz"	Randall MacLowry & Tracy Heather Strain	Randall MacLowry & Tracy Heather Strain	April 19, 2021
355	5	"Billy Graham"	Sarah Colt	Keven McAlester	May 17, 2021
356	6	"Sandra Day O'Connor: The First"	Michelle Ferrari	Michelle Ferrari	September 13, 2021
357	7	"Citizen Hearst" (Part 1)"	Amanda Pollak	Gene Tempest	September 27, 2021
358	8	"Citizen Hearst" (Part 2)"	Stephen Ives	Stephen Ives	September 28, 2021

=== Season 34 (2022) ===
No. overall	No. in season	Title	Directed by	Written by	Original release date
359	1	"Riveted: The History of Jeans"	Michael Bicks & Anna Lee Strachan	Michael Bicks & Anna Lee Strachan	February 7, 2022
360	2	"The American Diplomat"	Leola Calzolai-Stewart	Ken Chowder	February 15, 2022
361	3	"Flood in the Desert"	Rob Rapley	Rob Rapley	May 3, 2022
362	4	"Plague at the Golden Gate"	Li-Shin Yu	Susan Kim	May 24, 2022
363	5	"Taken Hostage (Part One)"	Robert Stone	Robert Stone	November 14, 2022
364	6	"Taken Hostage (Part Two)"	Robert Stone	Robert Stone	November 15, 2022

=== Season 35 (2023) ===
No. overall	No. in season	Title	Directed by	Written by	Original release date
365	1	"The Lie Detector"	Rob Rapley	Rob Rapley	January 3, 2023
366	2	"Zora Neale Hurston: Claiming a Space"	Tracy Heather Strain	Tracy Heather Strain	January 17, 2023
367	3	"Ruthless: Monopoly's Secret History"	Stephen Ives	Stephen Ives	February 20, 2023
368	4	"The Movement and the 'Madman'"	Stephen Talbot	(none credited)	March 28, 2023
369	5	"The Sun Queen"	Amanda Pollak	Gene Tempest	April 4, 2023
370	6	"Casa Susanna"	Sébastien Lifshitz	Sébastien Lifshitz	June 27, 2023
371	7	"The Busing Battleground"	Sharon Grimberg & Cyndee Readdean	Sharon Grimberg	September 11, 2023
372	8	"The Harvest: Integrating Mississippi's Schools"	Douglas A. Blackmon & Sam Pollard	Douglas A. Blackmon	September 12, 2023
373	9	"The War on Disco"	Lisa Quijano Wolfinger	Rushmore Denooyer	October 30, 2023

=== Season 36 (2024) ===
No. overall	No. in season	Title	Directed by	Written by	Original release date
374	1	"Nazi Town, USA"	Peter Yost	Peter Yost	January 23, 2024
375	2	"Fly With Me"	Sarah Colt & Helen Dobrowski	Sarah Colt	February 20, 2024
376	3	"The Cancer Detectives"	Amanda Pollak & Gene Tempest	Gene Tempest	March 26, 2024
377	4	"Poisoned Ground: The Tragedy at Love Canal"	Jamila Ephron	Jamila Ephron	April 22, 2024
378	5	"The Riot Report"	Michelle Ferrari	Michelle Ferrari & Jelani Cobb	May 21, 2024
379	6	"The American Vice President"	Michelle Ferrari	Michelle Ferrari	October 1, 2024
380	7	"American Coup: Wilmington 1898"	Brad Lichtenstein & Yoruba Richen	Brad Lichtenstein, Yoruba Richen & Peter Miller	November 12, 2024

=== Season 37 (2025) ===
No. overall	No. in season	Title	Directed by	Written by	Original release date
381	1	"Forgotten Hero: Walter White and the NAACP"	Michelle Smawley	Rob Rapley	February 25, 2025
382	2	"Change, Not Charity: The Americans with Disabilities Act"	James LeBrecht	Chana Gazit	March 25, 2025
383	3	"Mr. Polaroid"	Gene Tempest	Gene Tempest	May 19, 2025
384	4	"Clearing the Air: The War on Smog"	Peter Yost	Peter Yost & Edna Alburquerque	August 26, 2025
385	5	"Hard Hat Riot"	Marc Levin	Marc Levin & Daphne Pinkerson	September 30, 2025
386	6	"Kissinger (Part One)"	Barak Goodman	Barak Goodman	October 27, 2025
387	7	"Kissinger (Part Two)"	Barak Goodman	Barak Goodman	October 28, 2025
388	8	"Bombshell"	Ben Loeterman	Ben Loeterman	January 6, 2026

== Upcoming episodes ==
Title	Directed by	Premiere date
TBA		
