= John and Abigail Adams =

2006 television documentary

- Genre: Documentary
- Developed by: Paul Taylor
- Written by: Elizabeth Deane
- Directed by: Peter Jones
- Starring: Simon Russell Beale; Linda Emond
- Narrated by: David Ogden Stiers
- Music by: Steve Porcaro
- Country of origin: United States
- Original language: English

Production
- Producer: Elizabeth Deane
- Cinematography: Brian McDairmant (dramatic sequences); John Baynard (interviews)
- Editor: David Espar
- Running time: 120 minutes
- Production companies: WGBH Boston; Green Umbrella

Original release
- Network: PBS
- Release: January 23, 2006

John and Abigail Adams (stylized onscreen as John & Abigail Adams) is a 2006 television documentary film about American Founding Father and second President of the United States John Adams and his wife, Abigail Adams. Produced by PBS for the American Experience documentary program, it recounts the Adams couple's lives and partnership through both dramatizations and interviews. The film was directed by Peter Jones and written and produced by Elizabeth Deane, and it first aired on PBS in the United States on January 23, 2006.

== Cast ==
- Simon Russell Beale as John Adams
- Linda Emond as Abigail Adams
- James Barbour as Thomas Jefferson
- Anne Harsch as 19-year-old Nabby Adams
- David Mokriski as 12-year-old John Quincy Adams
  - Noah Pimentel as 7-year-old John Quincy

== Interviewees ==
- Joseph Ellis, historian
- John Ferling, historian
- Joanne Freeman, historian
- Edith B. Gelles, historian
- David McCullough, biographer and historian

== Critical response ==
Louis Howard of DVD Talk gave John and Abigail Adams four out of five stars, writing that it is "[a]nother strong entry" of the American Experience program. Howard added that while the film is 120 minutes in length, shorter than most other films from the series, it "has the advantage of brisk storytelling, keeping the viewer's interest throughout." Leigh H. Edwards of PopMatters expressed that the documentary is better at "refram[ing] its subjects for a 21st-century audience" than Benjamin Franklin, another film from American Experience about a founding father. Edwards stated that it "avoids [...] hagiography by focusing on many of Adams' own weaknesses and self-doubts, even while emphasizing how his genius and foresight led him to become [...] the 'premiere political thinker in Revolutionary America.'"

== Home media ==
John and Abigail Adams was released on DVD by PBS on January 24, 2006, the day after it aired on television. Though the film is part of The Presidents collection of American Experience, it is not included in the collection's DVD box set released on August 26, 2008.
