= Cochineal Red =

Cochineal Red may refer to:

- the red pigment carmine
- Cochineal Red A, a synthetic colourant known as Ponceau 4R
- Cochineal Red: travels through ancient Peru, 2006 travel book by Hugh Thomson
