= The West (miniseries) =

- DVD cover for The West
- Also known as: Ken Burns Presents: The West
- Genre: Documentary
- Written by: Dayton Duncan; Geoffrey Ward
- Directed by: Stephen Ives
- Voices of: Adam Arkin; Matthew Broderick; Keith Carradine; John Lithgow; Gary Sinise; Jimmy Smits; Eli Wallach
- Narrated by: Peter Coyote
- Theme music composer: Matthias Gohl
- Country of origin: United States
- Original language: English
- No. of seasons: 1
- No. of episodes: 8

Production
- Executive producer: Ken Burns
- Producers: Stephen Ives; Jody Abramson; Michael Kantor
- Running time: 12 hours (8 episodes)
- Production companies: Insignia Films; Florentine Films; WETA-TV; Time-Life Video and Television

Original release
- Network: PBS
- Release: September 15 – September 22, 1996

The West, sometimes marketed as Ken Burns Presents: The West, is a 1996 television documentary miniseries about the American Old West. It was directed by Stephen Ives and featured Ken Burns as executive producer. It was first broadcast on PBS on eight consecutive nights from September 15 to 22, 1996.

== Production ==
Stephen Ives and Ken Burns had worked together on several previous series, including The Civil War (1990) and Baseball (1994). In 1988, Ives created his own production company, Insignia Films, and began working on The West as director, with Burns signed on to the project as executive producer. In order to create The West, the film crew traveled over 100,000 miles (160,000 km) via airplane, conducted 72 interviews, visited 74 archives and collections, and filmed more than 250 hours of footage. Research consultants included Peter E. Palmquist, independent research expert on photographs of the period. The film's production was funded by General Motors.

Notable interviewees included historians Stephen Ambrose, J. S. Holliday, and Richard White; novelists Maxine Hong Kingston and N. Scott Momaday; environmentalists and writers Terry Tempest Williams and Marc Reisner; and politicians Ben Nighthorse Campbell, Ann Richards, Stewart Udall, and Ralph Yarborough.

Many notable actors lent their voices to The West, including Adam Arkin, Matthew Broderick, Ossie Davis, Keith Carradine, John Lithgow, Mary Stuart Masterson, Blythe Danner, the famous playwright Arthur Miller, Jimmy Smits, and Eli Wallach. The film's narrator, Peter Coyote, would later narrate ten more documentary films directed or produced by Burns, including The National Parks: America's Best Idea (2009), Prohibition (2011), The Roosevelts: An Intimate History (2014), The Vietnam War (2017), The Mayo Clinic: Faith--Hope--Science (2018), and Country Music (2019).

== Original airing ==
The West premiered on September 15, 1996, on PBS. The series was split into episodes, with one episode being aired each night for eight consecutive nights. Episodes were cut to about 90 minutes each in length, for a total length of over 12 hours for the entire series. The final episode aired on September 22, 1996.

=== Episodes ===
| No. | Title | Original release date |
|---|---|---|
| 1 | "The People" (to 1806) | September 15, 1996 |
1. The West; 2. Episode 1 – The People (to 1806); 3. The Vision; 4. The Vast West – The Spaniards; 5. Thunder Rolling from the Mountains; 6. The Horse – Dog Soldiers; 7. Tribal War; 8. California; 9. The Corps of Discovery; 10. The Outsiders
| 2 | "Empire Upon the Trails" (1806–1848) | September 16, 1996 |
1. Americans want America; 2. Episode 2 – Empire Upon the Trails (1806–1848); 3. The Heart of Everything; 4. Tejas – Texas; 5. The Alamo; 6. In the Midst of Savage Darkness; 7. The Barren Rock; 8. The Mormons; 9. Westward I go Free; 10. What a Country this Might be 11. So we Die; 12. The American Flag
| 3 | "Speck of the Future" (1848–1856) | September 17, 1996 |
1. Discovery; 2. The Gold Rush; 3. Episode 3 – Speck of the Future (1848–1856); 4. My Share of the Rocks; 5. The Real Danger – Cholera; 6. Kit Carson; 7. Stay at Home; 8. The Diggings; 9. Wine, Women and Song; 10. The Right of Conquest; 11. Emporium of the Pacific; 12. The Red Indian Problem; 13. Days of '49
| 4 | "Death Runs Riot" (1856–1868) | September 18, 1996 |
1. War on the Horizon; 2. Episode 4 – Death Runs Riot (1856–1868); 3. Mountain Meadows Massacre; 4. The Mexicans; 5. This Guilty Land – Civil War; 6. Anarchy; 7. Preachers and Jackass Rabbits; 8. Who is the Savage?; 9. The Everywhere Spirit; 10. General George Custer
| 5 | "The Grandest Enterprise Under God" (1868–1874) | September 19, 1996 |
1. The Railroad; 2. Episode 5 – The Grandest Enterprise Under God (1868–1874); 3. The Buffalo; 4. The Artillery of Heaven; 5. The Spotted Cows; 6. One People; 7. Frank H. Mayer; 8. Good Company; 9. Cowboys; 10. A Wound in the Heart
| 6 | "Fight No More Forever" (1874–1877) | September 20, 1996 |
1. Red Indians Fight Back; 2. Episode 6 – Fight No More Forever (1874–1877); 3. General George Custer; 4. Sitting Bull; 5. Hard Times; 6. A Good Day to Die – Custer's Last Stand; 7. Disbelief and Revenge; 8. Center my Heart – Mormon Sacrifice; 9. Good Words – Chief Joseph; 10. Surrender
| 7 | "The Geography of Hope" (1877–1887) | September 21, 1996 |
1. Conquest of The West?; 2. Episode 7 – The Geography of Hope (1877–1887); 3. The Hunger for Land; 4. A Hard Time I Have; 5. The Chinese Problem; 6. The Romance of my Life; 7. Los Angeles; 8. The Brothel of the Nation; 9. Friends of the Indian; 10. Hell Without the Heat; 11. Buffalo Bill Cody
| 8 | "One Sky Above Us" (1887–1914) | September 22, 1996 |
Part 1; 1. A Part on the Back; 2. Episode 8 – One Sky Above Us (1887–1914); 3. The Outcome of our Earnest Endeavours; 4. Ghost Dance; 5. P.S. I Like You Very Much; Part 2; 1. Without Logic; 2. Go North Young Man; 3. This isn't History; 4. Buffalo Bird Woman; 5. Will Never Leave You; 6. The Gift

=== Home video release ===
When The West was released on VHS, the finale episode, "One Sky Above Us," was divided into two one-hour episodes, titled "Ghost Dance" and "One Sky Above Us." This VHS edition was released September 24, 1996. PBS later released a five-disc DVD set of The West on September 30, 2003.

== Reception ==
The West was well received by both popular audiences and historians. Over 38 million viewers watched the series during its original airing, and it earned an average national Nielsen rating of 5.0. In 1997, the Organization of American Historians awarded The West its Erik Barnouw Award.

Film and television critics also responded positively to The West. Caryn James of The New York Times praised the series for its "enthralling detail" and authenticity, calling it "fiercely and brilliantly rooted in fact." Richard Zoglin of TIME judged the series "a sweeping, thoughtful, often moving look at America's conquest of the West", and Howard Rosenberg of the Los Angeles Times wrote that, "director Stephen Ives succeeds magnificently, delivering a lush work at once fully documented and fully entertaining... no one could ask for better television."
