= Stanley Nelson Jr. =

American documentary filmmaker (born 1951)

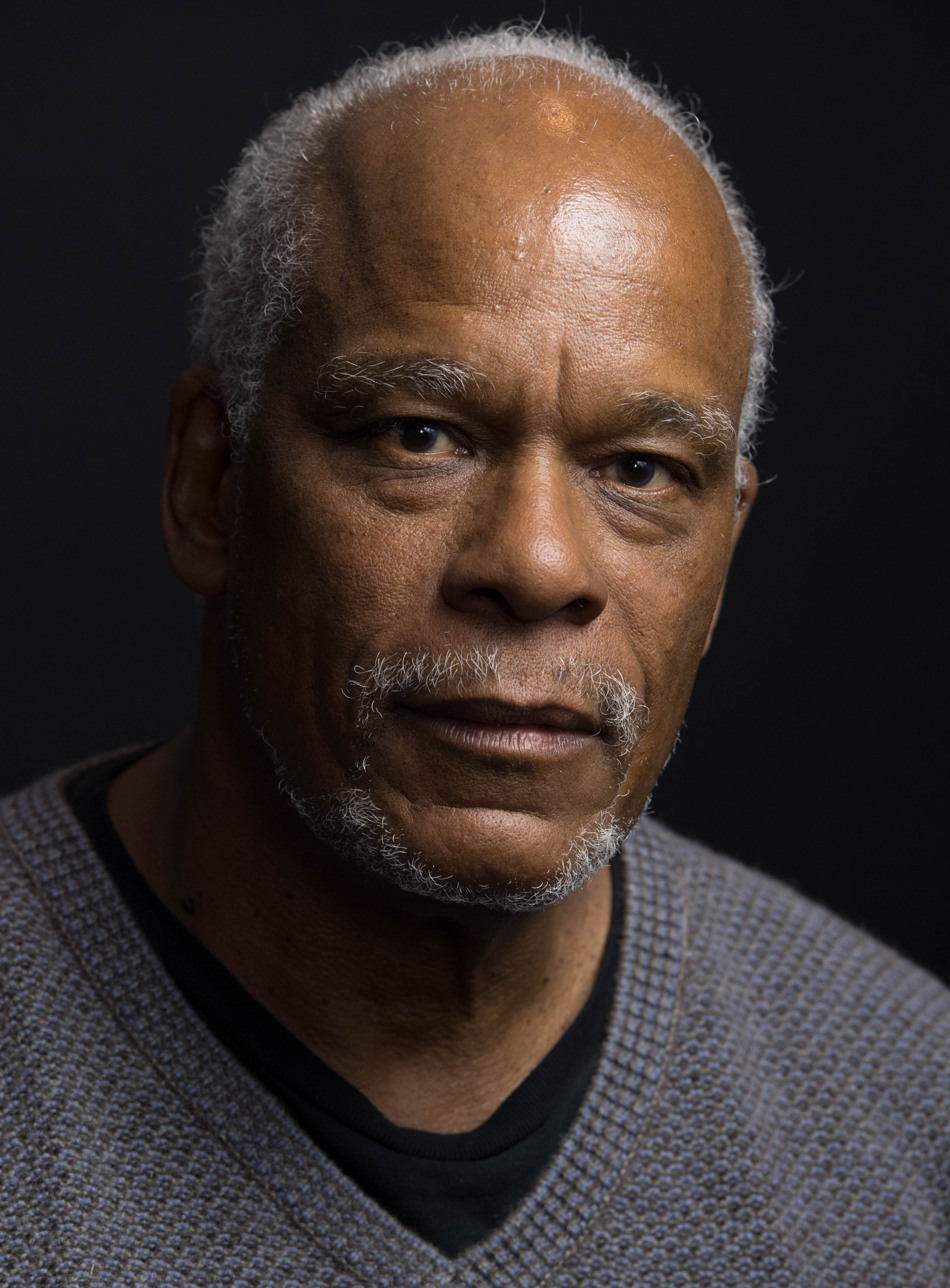
- Stanley Nelson Jr. at the 2017 Montclair Film Festival
- Born: Stanley Earl Nelson Jr. June 7, 1951 (age 75); New York City, New York, U.S.
- Education: New Lincoln School
- Alma mater: City College of New York (B.F.A. 1976)
- Occupations: Film director, producer
- Awards: MacArthur Fellows Program; National Humanities Medal

Stanley Earl Nelson Jr. (born June 7, 1951) is an American documentary filmmaker and a MacArthur Fellow known as a director, writer and producer of documentaries examining African-American history and experiences. He is a recipient of the 2013 National Humanities Medal from US President Barack Obama. He has won three Primetime Emmy Awards.

Among his notable films are Freedom Riders (2010), Wounded Knee (2009), Jonestown: The Life & Death of People's Temple (2006), Sweet Honey in the Rock: Raise Your Voice (2005), A Place of Our Own (2004), The Murder of Emmett Till (2003), and The Black Press: Soldiers without Swords (1998).

== Early life and education ==
Nelson was born in New York City on June 7, 1951, to Stanley Nelson Sr. and A'lelia (Ransom) Nelson, and the second of four children. Nelson's mother A'lelia Nelson was the last president of the Madam C.J. Walker Manufacturing Company, a famous early black enterprise established in 1906 that produced hair care products and cosmetics for black women. A'lelia was also a librarian at City College of New York and was acquisitions supervisor for the Library of Congress. Nelson's father Dr. Stanley Earl Nelson Sr. was a dentist who was a pioneer in reconstructive dentistry and taught at New York University. Dr. Nelson was also an active supporter of the civil rights movement. Nelson's sister Jill Nelson is a prominent African-American journalist and author.

Nelson attended New Lincoln School, a private Manhattan school, from kindergarten through high school. He attended Beloit College in Wisconsin and later transferred to six different colleges including New York University, Morris Brown College, and Hunter College. He graduated from the Leonard Davis Film School at the City College of New York with a Bachelor of Fine Arts in 1976.

== Career ==
After graduation, Nelson earned an apprenticeship with the documentary filmmaker William Greaves. Nelson wrote and produced his 1987 documentary about the first self-made American millionairess, Two Dollars and a Dream: The Story of Madam C.J. Walker, which aired as part of Black History Month presentations on PBS in 1988. The film was named Best Production of the Decade by the Black Filmmakers Foundation, and won the CINE Golden Eagle Award.

Nelson soon found a job at PBS, working as a television producer with Bill Moyers for the TV series Listening to America. His next film releases included the Emmy Award-nominated documentary The Black Press: Soldiers Without Swords (1999), and Marcus Garvey: Look for Me in the Whirlwind (2000) about civil right activist Marcus Garvey was first place overall winner at the Black Filmmakers Hall of Fame in 2001 and won best documentary at the 2002 Black International Cinema Awards. Nelson has made several productions for the Smithsonian Institution, including a tribute to African-American artists, entitled Free Within Ourselves, and Climbing Jacob's Ladder.

He received a MacArthur Fellowship in 2002. Nelson also received fellowships at the American Film Institute, the New York Foundation for the Arts, and Columbia University. He was on the selection panel for three years for the Fulbright Fellowship in film.

For the 2003 The American Experience (PBS) episode The Murder Of Emmett Till, Nelson won the Primetime Emmy Award for Outstanding Directing for Nonfiction Programming, Sundance Film Festival Special Jury Prize, and the George Foster Peabody Award.

Nelson's 2004 film A Place of Our Own was nominated for the Grand Jury Prize at the Sundance Film Festival. In 2004, he also won the Educational Video Center's Excellence in Community Service Award.

In 2007, he received an Emmy nomination for Exceptional Merit in Documentary Filmmaking as a producer of Jonestown: The Life and Death of Peoples Temple that aired on PBS series The American Experience.

On May 4, 2011, Nelson and his film Freedom Riders were featured on The Oprah Winfrey Show in a special program celebrating the 50th anniversary of the Freedom Riders. Nelson won two Emmy awards for the film in 2011: Outstanding Writing for Nonfiction Programming, and Exceptional Merit in Documentary Filmmaking as one of the producers.

Nelson's 2014 documentary Freedom Summer profiled the 1964 civil rights movement activism in Mississippi. It aired on PBS American Experience and won Best Documentary at the Pan-African film festival.

Nelson directed the 2015 documentary The Black Panthers: Vanguard of the Revolution, the first of what is to be a three-part series of documentaries about African-American history titled America Revisited. He won an Emmy Award for Exceptional Merit in Documentary Filmmaking as one of the producers of this film in 2016.

He is a member of the Academy of Motion Picture Arts and Sciences and a recipient of the NEH National Humanities Medal presented by President Obama in 2014. In 2015 the American Film Institute made him its Guggenheim Symposium Honoree. He was awarded a 2015 Individual Peabody Award, presented at the 2016 award ceremony. In 2016 he received a Lifetime Achievement Award from the News & Documentary Emmy Awards.

Nelson is Executive Director and co-founder of Firelight Media with his wife, writer and producer Marcia Smith, a nonprofit that provides technical education and professional support to emerging documentarians. The organization received the MacArthur Award for Creative and Effective Institutions in 2015. He is co-founder of Firelight Films, the for-profit documentary production company.

== Filmography ==
- Freedom Bags (1990)
- Schools for A New Society (1993)
- Puerto Rico: A Right to Choose (1994)
- The Black Press: Soldiers Without Swords (1998)
- Marcus Garvey: Look For Me in the Whirlwind (2000)
- Running the Campaign for City Council (2002)
- The Murder of Emmett Till (2003)
- A Place of Our Own (2004)
- Beyond Brown: Pursuing the Promise (2004)
- Sweet Honey in the Rock: Raise Your Voice (2005)
- Faces of Change (2005)
- Jonestown: The Life and Death of Peoples Temple (2006)
- CNN Presents High Stakes (2006)
- We Shall Remain (Part 5) - "Wounded Knee" (2009)
- Immigration Part 1: Battleground Arizona (2009)
- Immigration Part II: Raid in New Bedford (2009)
- Immigration Part III: Guest Workers in the Gulf (2009)
- Arise: the Battle over Affirmative Action (2010)
- Freedom Riders (2010)
- Freedom Summer (2014)
- The Black Panthers: Vanguard of the Revolution (2015)
- Tell Them We Are Rising: The Story of Black Colleges and Universities (2017)
- Miles Davis: Birth of the Cool (2019)
- Boss: The Black Experience in Business (2019)
- Vick (2020)
- Attica (2021)
- Harriet Tubman: Visions of Freedom (2022)
- Sound of the Police (2023)
- San Juan Hill: Manhattan's Lost Neighborhood (2024)
- We Want the Funk! (2025)
