= Elizabeth Deane =

- Occupations: Producer, writer, and director
- Employer: GBH-TV
- Notable work: Vietnam: A Television History, Rock & Roll
- Children: 2

Elizabeth Deane is a writer, producer and director of documentary films for PBS, specializing in American history. She is best known for Vietnam: A Television History, described by the New York Times as "a landmark in television journalism", as well as her many prizewinning films for the PBS series American Experience. Her limited series, Rock & Roll, was described by the Times as "as good as television gets." Vietnam won six Emmys. Both Vietnam and Rock & Roll received Peabody Awards. Her other works include presidential politics, biographies, and musical history.

== Career ==
Vietnam, with Stanley Karnow as Chief Correspondent, drew PBS's largest audience to date. Deane, based at WGBH-TV in Boston, wrote and produced three episodes in the thirteen-part series: "America's Mandarin", "Homefront USA", and "The End of the Tunnel". Vietnam won six Emmy Awards, a Peabody Award, a George Polk Award, a DuPont-Columbia Award, and an Erik Barnouw Award from the Organization of American Historians. Originally broadcast in 1983, the program was rebroadcast as part of the PBS history series American Experience in 1997.

Deane was also co-creator and executive producer for the PBS series Rock & Roll, a co-production of GBH and the BBC. The ten-part documentary series, with Rolling Stone and former New York Times music critic Robert Palmer as chief consultant, traced the history of rock music from the 1950s through the early 1990s. The New York Times deemed the series as "good as television gets". Rock & Roll won a Peabody Award and the American Society of Composers, Authors and Publishers Deems Taylor award for excellence in music programming. The program was also nominated for an Emmy. Under the BBC title of Dancing in the Street, the series was nominated for the BAFTA award.

Prior to Rock & Roll, Deane was senior producer for Frontline's four-part series Crisis in Central America, which won a Peabody Award. She was senior producer for the 13-part series War and Peace in the Nuclear Age for GBH in 1989.

Deane productions for the American Experience series include programs for its special collection, The Presidents. She was executive producer for "Nixon" in 1990, and wrote, directed and produced Part II of the three-part series. "Nixon" was nominated for an Emmy that year and won a Writers Guild Award for Deane in 1991. She was executive producer for "The Kennedys" in 1992, which won the Best Documentary award from the British Broadcasting Press Guild in 1993. The Presidents series won a George Foster Peabody Award in 1997.

Continuing her work for American Experience, Deane was executive producer for "The Rockefellers" in 2000, and wrote, directed and produced Part 1. She was executive producer of "Ulysses S. Grant", which aired in 2002. She also wrote, produced, and directed part two of "Ulysses S. Grant". "Reconstruction: The Second Civil War" followed in 2004. Deane was series producer for "Reconstruction", and she wrote and produced part two of the series. Deane was awarded an Erik Barnouw Award for "Reconstruction" from the Organization of American Historians as well as a Writers Guild Award nomination. She was series producer and wrote "John & Abigail Adams" for The Presidents in 2006. "John & Abigail Adams" was also nominated for a Writers Guild Award.

In 2009, she was co-creator and executive producer of a second musical history for GBH and the BBC, Latin Music USA. The four-part series documented music created by Latinos in the U.S. and was featured at the Aspen Ideas Festival.

More recently Deane served as an executive producer for the four-part PBS series American Veteran, which premiered in 2021. Produced by Insignia Films and subtitled "You are Never the Same", the series described the veteran experience across the arc of American history and explored the present deep divide between veterans and civilians, who have no idea what it means to serve. Each episode was narrated by a different veteran, including actor Drew Carey and Senator Tammy Duckworth. As one critic described the series, "It asks civilians to walk a mile in veteran boots, and it lights a path for the journey."

Deane has also worked in support of GBH's Media Library and Archives, writing short essays featuring programming from the archives for the GBH digital program guide. The essays are posted on Open Vault, the website of the GBH archives.

== Personal life ==
Raised in Coconut Grove and Coral Gables, Florida, Deane is an art history graduate of Wellesley College. She is married with two children and lives in Boston, Massachusetts.

== See also ==
- PBS
- American Experience
