= 1964 (disambiguation) =

1964 was a leap year starting on Wednesday of the Gregorian calendar.

1964 may also refer to:

- 1964 the Tribute, a Beatles tribute band
- 1964 (film), a 2015 American documentary film
- "1964" (Our Friends in the North), a 1996 British television episode
- "1964" (Pan Am), a 2012 American television episode
