= Susan J. Douglas =

American feminist writer (born 1950)

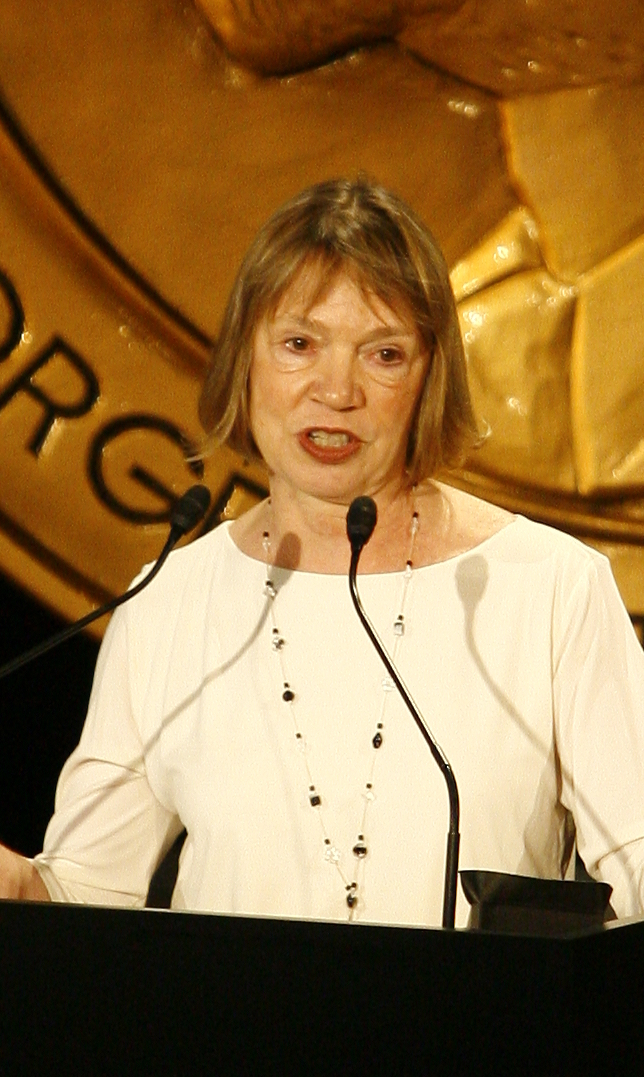
Douglas at the 69th Annual Peabody Awards

Susan J. Douglas (born 1950) is an American feminist columnist and cultural critic who writes about gender issues, media criticism, and American politics. She has published five books on American history, and is currently Catherine Neafie Kellogg Professor of communication studies at the University of Michigan at Ann Arbor.

== Publications ==
Douglas is widely regarded for her 1994 book Where the Girls Are: Growing Up Female with the Mass Media, which was selected as one of the top ten books of the year by National Public Radio, Entertainment Weekly magazine and The McLaughlin Group, and which Michiko Kakutani described in the New York Times as "provocative ... irreverent and sometimes very funny."

She penned Listening In: Radio And The American Imagination in 1999, a look at the cultural impact of radio on American imagination, expressing concern over creative stagnation at the time, yet cautious optimism for radio's future. The book won the Sally Hacker Prize for exceptional scholarship that reaches beyond academia to a broad audience in 2000. She appeared as a commentator in Ken Burns' 1992 documentary Empire of the Air: The Men Who Made Radio.

In 2010, her book Enlightened Sexism: The Seductive Message that Feminism's Work Is Done was published. In it, Douglas examines the evolution of the women in the media – the rise of depictions of power and success giving credence to the idea of feminism having fulfilled its aims, and of sexist old-style depictions of women as sex objects – and how these undermine women's status and equality.

In March 2020, Douglas published In Our Prime: How Older Women are Reinventing the Road Ahead. In this book, she critiques stereotypes of older women and the intertwining of agism and sexism in US culture, and suggests that women of all ages work together to oppose them.

Douglas has also written two co-authored books, The Mommy Myth with Meredith Michaels (2005) and Celebrity with Andrea McDonnell (2019).

== Magazine publications ==
She has written for The Nation, In These Times, The Village Voice, Ms. magazine, the Washington Post and TV Guide, and was media critic for The Progressive from 1992 to 1998. Her column “Back Talk” appears monthly in In These Times. In a more recent article for "In These Times," Professor Douglas posted a piece titled "We Can’t All Just Get Along" where she stated that Republicans have “crafted a political identity that rests on a complete repudiation of the idea that the opposing party and its followers have any legitimacy at all.” While the magazine said that it had created the blog title, the first sentence of the piece was "I hate Republicans", which drew incendiary reactions from others, including Republicans.

== Professional societies ==
Douglas was a member of the Peabody Awards Board of Jurors from 2004 to 2010, and she served as chair from 2009 to 2010.

== See also ==
- Walt Disney (2015 PBS film)
- 1964 (2015 film)

== Bibliography ==
- In Our Prime: How Older Women Are Reinventing the Road Ahead (2020).
- Celebrity: A History of Fame (2019), with Andrea McDonnell.
- Enlightened Sexism: The Seductive Message that Feminism's Work Is Done (2010)
- The Mommy Myth: The Idealization of Motherhood and How It Has Undermined All Women, with Meredith Michaels (2005)
- Listening In: Radio And The American Imagination (1999)
- Where the Girls Are: Growing Up Female with the Mass Media (1994)
- Inventing American Broadcasting, 1899–1922 (Johns Hopkins Studies in the History of Technology, 1989)
