= The History of Rock 'n' Roll =

- Genre: Music, Documentary
- Created by: Andrew Solt, Quincy Jones
- Narrated by: Gary Busey
- Ending theme: "Rock and Roll Music"
- Composer: Chuck Berry
- Country of origin: United States
- Original language: English
- No. of seasons: 1
- No. of episodes: 10

Production
- Production companies: Andrew Solt Productions; Quincy Jones/David Salzman Entertainment; Telepictures Productions; Time-Life Video & Television

Original release
- Network: Prime Time Entertainment Network
- Release: March 6 – May 8, 1995

The History of Rock 'n' Roll is a ten episode television documentary mini-series produced by Time-Life. It originally aired on the Prime Time Entertainment Network from March to May in 1995. All parts were later released on VHS, DVD, and reran on TLC and VH1, the latter which showed all ten parts in the last 10 weeks of the year 1999 on Friday night as part of a countdown to the year 2000. The series covers Rock Music from the 1950s to the 1990s and features over 200 exclusive interviews with many well-known artists and other music industry figures.

Coincidentally in the same year as "The History of Rock 'n' Roll" first screened another 10-part documentary series, "Rock & Roll" (aka "Dancing in the Street" in the UK), was co-produced for PBS and the BBC, and which also covered the background of rock music.

== Episodes ==
No.	Title	Original release date
1	"Rock ’n’ Roll Explodes"	March 6, 1995
This first episode of the series explores the roots of Rock 'n' Roll as a musical genre.
2	"Good Rockin’ Tonight"	March 13, 1995
Rock and Roll goes mainstream and becomes popular with white teenagers and faces opposition, particularly from older adults who see it as a corrupting influence.
3	"Britain Invades, America Fights Back"	March 20, 1995
In the 1960s, music artists from Great Britain like The Beatles, The Rolling Stones, and The Who become popular in the United States.
4	"The Sounds of Soul"	March 27, 1995
This episode explores the development of Soul with in the Rock 'n' Roll genre.
5	"Plugging In"	April 3, 1995
This episode examines the expanding electric music scene.
6	"My Generation"	April 10, 1995
The peace-loving counter culture produces the phenomenon of Woodstock.
7	"Guitar Heroes"	April 17, 1995
Les Paul's invention of the electric guitar paved the way for later Rock 'n' Roll guitar heroes.
8	"The ’70s: Have a Nice Decade"	April 24, 1995
This episode reviews the development of Rock 'n' Roll music of the 1970s.
9	"Punk"	May 1, 1995
This episode reviews the development of Punk Music in the 1970s.
10	"Up from the Underground"	May 8, 1995
In the 1980s and 90s, rock n' roll influences new genres of music such as Hip Hop, New Wave, and Grunge. Music videos also have an impact.

== See also ==
- Rock & Roll (aka Dancing in the Street), a 1995 television documentary series, also about the history of rock music, co-produced for PBS and the BBC
- Seven Ages of Rock, 2007 series produced by the BBC and VH1 Classic
