= Sweet Honey in the Rock: Raise Your Voice =

2005 Television documentary

Sweet Honey in the Rock: Raise Your Voice is a 2005 television documentary. It was produced by Firelight Media and directed by Stanley Nelson for the PBS series American Masters.

The film chronicles the history, music, and cultural impact of Sweet Honey in the Rock, a Grammy Award-winning African American female a cappella group with musical roots combining jazz, blues and sacred songs of the black church such as spirituals, hymns, and gospel. The documentary uses concert footage (including two major concerts that were on Nov 5, 2003 and Dec 7, 2003 that were put onto a CD soundtrack for this film with 22 tracks.) and rehearsals, archival stills, and reflections by ensemble members, as well as interviews with scholars and cultural commentators. It is intended to introduce the viewer to the group's performance style and activism, and "the organization's significance as a national institution".
