= The Murder of Emmett Till (film) =

2003 documentary film

The Murder of Emmett Till is a 2003 documentary film produced by Firelight Media that aired on the PBS program American Experience. The film chronicles the story of Emmett Till, a 14-year-old black boy from Chicago visiting relatives in Mississippi in 1955. He was brutally murdered by two white men after an interaction with the white girlfriend of one of them.

Emmett's mother, Mamie Till Bradley, insisted on a public funeral with an open casket. Photos of the decaying and mutilated body flooded newspapers, putting the case on the map both nationally and internationally. The two men accused of his murder were acquitted after a short five-day trial with an all-white male jury, making a mockery of any possibility of justice. Shortly afterward, the defendants sold their story to journalists detailing how they carried out the murder. The Emmett Till case was a significant motivator of the Civil Rights Movement, and the Montgomery bus boycott began three months after his body was discovered in the Tallahatchie River.

== Awards ==
- 2004 Henry Hampton Award for Excellence in Film and Digital Media
- 2003 Emmy Award – Best Non-fiction Director Stanley Nelson
- 2003 Emmy Nomination – Best Screenplay Marcia Smith
- 2003 International Documentary Association Awards – Distinguished Documentary Achievement
- 2003 Sundance Film Festival Special Jury Award
- 2003 Peabody Award

== See also ==
- Civil rights movement in popular culture
