= Ulysses S. Grant (film) =

2002 television documentary film

- Genre: Documentary
- Written by: Adriana Bosch; Elizabeth Deane
- Directed by: Adriana Bosch; Elizabeth Deane
- Narrated by: Liev Schreiber
- Music by: Michael Whalen
- Country of origin: United States
- Original language: English

Production
- Producers: Adriana Bosch; Elizabeth Deane
- Cinematography: Terry Hopkins; Buddy Squires; Boyd Estus
- Editors: Jon Neuburger; Bill Lattanzi
- Running time: 220 minutes
- Production company: WGBH Boston

Original release
- Network: PBS
- Release: May 5, 2002

Ulysses S. Grant is a 2002 two-part television documentary film about Ulysses S. Grant, the 18th President of the United States. Produced by PBS for the American Experience documentary program, it recounts Grant's life from his childhood in Ohio to his presidency, with narration by Liev Schreiber. The film was released in two parts on May 5 and 6, 2002, with part one (titled "Warrior") written, produced, and directed by Adriana Bosch, and part two (titled "President") written, produced, and directed by Elizabeth Deane.

== Interviewees ==
- David Bradley, writer
- Max Byrd, novelist
- Dan T. Carter, historian
- Mark Grimsley, historian
- William S. McFeely, biographer
- James M. McPherson, historian
- Donald L. Miller, historian
- Geoffrey Perret, biographer
- John Y. Simon, historian
- Brooks D. Simpson, historian
- Joan Waugh, historian

== Critical response ==
For the rebroadcast of Ulysses S. Grant: Warrior in 2011, Neil Genzlinger of The New York Times deemed it better than the more recent American Experience film Robert E. Lee, about the titular Confederate general during the American Civil War. Genzlinger reasoned that Grant was a more interesting figure than Lee, and that Ulysses S. Grant's light use of reenactments made it a more engaging film than Robert E. Lee, which has none.

== Home media ==
Ulysses S. Grant was first released on VHS by PBS on August 27, 2002. PBS would release the film on DVD by February 15, 2005. Though it is part of The Presidents collection of American Experience, it is not included in the collection's DVD box set released in August 2008.
