= George W. Bush (film) =

2020 television documentary film

- Genre: Documentary
- Written by: Barak Goodman; Chris Durrance
- Directed by: Jamila Ephron
- Narrated by: Corey Stoll
- Music by: Art Farm West
- Country of origin: United States
- Original language: English

Production
- Producers: Barak Goodman (senior); Jamila Ephron; Chris Durrance
- Cinematography: Stephen McCarthy
- Editors: Ben Hilton (Part One); Sandrine Isambert (Part Two)
- Production company: Ark Media

Original release
- Network: PBS
- Release: May 4, 2020

George W. Bush is a 2020 two-part biographical television film about former United States President George W. Bush. Produced by PBS for the American Experience documentary program, it recounts Bush's life from his childhood up to the end of his two-term presidency in 2008. Directed by Jamila Ephron and written by Barak Goodman and Chris Durrance, the film aired on PBS in two parts on May 4 and 5, 2020.

== Interviewees ==
- Andy Card – White House Chief of Staff from 2001 to 2006
- Ari Fleischer – White House Press Secretary from 2001 to 2003
- Barton Gellman – Journalist
- Bill Minutaglio – Journalist
- Clay Johnson – Deputy Director of the Office of Management and Budget from 2003 to 2009
- Dan Bartlett – Employee on Bush's 1994 and 1998 gubernatorial campaigns, policy director in Bush's governor's office, White House Communications Director from 2001 to 2005, Counselor to the President from 2005 to 2007
- David Frum – Bush's presidential speechwriter
- Eugene Robinson – Journalist
- Gen. David Petraeus – Commander of United States Central Command from 2008 to 2010
- Elisabeth Bumiller – Journalist
- George Packer – Journalist
- Joshua Bolten – White House Chief of Staff from 2006 to 2009
- Karl Rove – Senior Advisor to the President from 2001 to 2007, White House Deputy Chief of Staff for Policy from 2005 to 2007
- Col. Lawrence Wilkerson – Chief of Staff to U.S. Secretary of State Colin Powell from 2002 to 2005
- Lawrence Wright – Journalist
- Martha Raddatz – Journalist
- Michael Morell – Bush's presidential daily briefer
- Peter Baker – Journalist
- Richard Clarke – National Coordinator for Security, Infrastructure Protection, and Counter-Terrorism from 1998 to 2003
- Robin Wright – Journalist
- Ron Suskind – Journalist
- Wayne Slater – Journalist

== Production ==
On July 29, 2019, PBS announced that American Experience will produce a two-part biographical film about former president George W. Bush to be released in spring 2020. The film was then titled W, with Barak Goodman as writer, producer, and director; Goodman previously wrote and directed the 2012 film on Bill Clinton. By January 2020, Jamila Ephron was revealed to have since become part of the project.

On April 14, 2020, PBS revealed that the film will premiere the next month on May 4 and 5. In regard to the inclusion of Ari Fleischer and Andrew Card, both of whom have been documented to give lies during the Bush administration, Goodman explained that "I think that what this administration, with some exceptions, underwent was a process of self-delusion. Not that they set out to lie to the American people, they lied to themselves", adding that "[t]he fact is, these were the guys who were there."

== Critical response ==
Brian Lowry of CNN gave George W. Bush a negative review, criticizing its omission of some significant details in Bush's life and presidency such as the controversy toward his National Guard service and Karl Rove's alleged "smear tactics" during the 2000 primary of the Republican Party, in addition to the film's decision not to cover his post-presidency. Lowry added that the film is also unsuccessful in adding further insight into Bush's character other than what is already known about him. Scott D. Pierce of The Salt Lake Tribune on the other hand assessed the film to be "worth watching" for its direct and fair documentation of Bush's life.
