= Stephen Ives =

American documentary film director

- Born: Stephen Ives; Boston, Massachusetts, U.S.
- Education: Harvard University.
- Website: https://insigniafilms.com/Stephen-Ives-Founder

Stephen Ives is an American documentary film director and original founder of Insignia Films. Among his productions are The West (1996), Reporting America at War (2003), Roads to Memphis (2010), and Grand Coulee Dam (2012), and the four-part series Constitution USA (2013) which aired on PBS in the summer of 2013. PBS broadcast his most recent aired work, The Great War, in three parts (2017).

== Biography ==
Ives is a son of David O. Ives, former president of WGBH Boston. After graduating from Harvard University with a degree in American history, Ives spent five years living in Texas. Ives credits these years for his fascination with "the myth and landscape and people of the West."

In his eighteen years of work in public television, Ives has established himself as one of the nation's leading independent documentary directors. His landmark series The West was seen by more than 38 million people nationwide during its national PBS premiere in the fall of 1996. Caryn James of The New York Times wrote that The West was "fiercely and brilliantly rooted in fact," and The New York Daily News called the programs a "breathtakingly beautiful series of films. . . that make riveting TV."

Ives' documentary film Lindbergh, a portrait of the reluctant American hero Charles A. Lindbergh, premiered the third season of American Experience series on PBS in 1990. The Los Angeles Times called the film "a powerful slice of history. . . an engrossing study of a complex figure."

In 1987, Ives began a decade-long collaboration with filmmaker Ken Burns, as a co-producer of a history of the United States Congress, and as a consulting producer on the series, The Civil War and Baseball.

After the premiere of The West, Ives turned his attention towards contemporary films, producing a profile of the innovative Cornerstone Theater Company, which aired on HBO in the fall of 1999, and Amato: A Love Affair with Opera, a portrait of the world's smallest opera company which aired nationally on PBS in 2001 and earned Ives a nomination from the Directors Guild of America for Outstanding Directorial Achievement.

His profile of the 1930s thoroughbred Seabiscuit, which aired on American Experience in April 2003, won a Primetime Emmy award, and his PBS series, Reporting America at War, about American war correspondents, was lauded by the Los Angeles Times as "television that matters ... a visual document of power and clarity".

In 2018, Ives won the Writer's Guild Award for outstanding achievement in writing for The Great War, Part II.

== Filmography ==
- Lindbergh (1990)
- The West (1996)
- Cornerstone (1999)
- Amato: A Love Affair with Opera (2001)
- Seabiscuit (2003)
- Reporting America at War (2003)
- Las Vegas: An Unconventional History (2005)
- New Orleans (2007)
- Kit Carson (2008)
- Roads to Memphis (documentary) (2010)
- Panama Canal (2011)
- Custer's Last Stand (2012)
- Grand Coulee Dam (2012)
- Constitution USA (2013)
- 1964 (2014)
- The Great War (2017), directed with Amanda Pollak and Rob Rapley
- Sealab (2017)
- Ruthless: Monopoly’s Secret History (2023)
