= Rock & Roll (TV series) =

- Also known as: Dancing in the Street: a Rock and Roll History (U.K. title)
- Genre: Documentary
- Narrated by: Liev Schreiber
- Opening theme: "Purple Haze" performed by Jimi Hendrix
- Countries of origin: United States; United Kingdom
- Original language: English
- No. of seasons: 1
- No. of episodes: 10

Production
- Executive producer: Elizabeth Deane
- Producer: Hugh Thomson
- Production companies: WGBH Educational Foundation; BBC
- Budget: US$8 million

Original release
- Network: PBS
- Release: September 24 – September 28, 1995

Rock & Roll (U.S. title) or Dancing in the Street: a Rock and Roll History (U.K. title) is a 10-part American-British television documentary series about the history of rock and roll music produced by the BBC and WGBH, and which screened in 1995 on PBS in the United States and on BBC Two in the United Kingdom during 1996.

Elizabeth Deane and Hugh Thomson were executive producer and series producer, respectively, for both the PBS and BBC versions. However different narrators were used for the two countries, with Liev Schreiber narrating for a US audience and Seán Barrett used in the UK. The music critic Robert Palmer was chief consultant on the series, which received a Peabody Award.

On PBS, funding was provided by the Corporation for Public Broadcasting, PBS viewers, Experience Music Project (five years prior to opening), the National Endowment for the Arts, RadioShack (promoting its then-sponsorship of the Rock and Roll Hall of Fame and Museum) and Boston Beer Company. Most of the titles used for the PBS "Rock & Roll" episodes differed from those given for the BBC's later "Dancing in the Street" versions.

Coincidentally, in the same year as "Rock & Roll" first screened, another 10-part documentary miniseries, "The History of Rock 'n' Roll", was produced for US television by Andrew Solt and Quincy Jones, which also covered the background of rock music.

== Episodes ==
No.	Title	UK release date
1	"The Renegades (PBS) / Whole Lotta Shakin' (BBC)"	15 June 1996
In the fifties, a new musical force appeared, shaking up clean-living America – rock 'n' roll. Following Fats Domino's lead, Little Richard burst onto the scene in New Orleans. In Memphis, the new music also emerged, and a young Elvis Presley recorded his first songs.
2	"In the Groove (PBS) / Be My Baby (BBC)"	22 June 1996
Girl groups, the surf sound, and perfect pop take over the charts.
3	"Shakespeares in the Alley (PBS) / So You Want to Be a Rock and Roll Star (BBC)"	29 June 1996
When Bob Dylan arrived in New York, he stirred up not only the placid world of folk music but also rock'n'roll, influencing everyone from the Beatles to the Byrds. Meanwhile in Britain, the Beatles were expanding on the legacy of the Shadows and skiffle to open out British rock music.
4	"Respect"	6 July 1996
An examination of the birth of soul music, from Ray Charles's first adaptation of gospel through Sam Cooke's death to the start of the Motown empire and, in Memphis, the sound of Stax Records.
5	"Crossroads"	13 July 1996
In the early sixties Chicago blues is adopted by British listeners and the music of artists such as Muddy Waters gives birth to a succession of new British rhythm-and-blues artists.
6	"Blues in Technicolor (PBS) / Eight Miles High (BBC)"	20 July 1996
In 1966, San Francisco became the centre of rock's psychedelic era. Meanwhile in London, Pink Floyd were emerging with an experimental new sound.
7	"The Wild Side (PBS) / Hang on to Yourself (BBC)"	27 July 1996
Musicians are left nursing a hangover after the failure of the summer of love. Into the breach step some of the most outrageous figures yet to grace a rock stage, like The Doors, Lou Reed, Alice Cooper, Iggy Pop and David Bowie.
8	"Punk (PBS) / No Fun (BBC)"	3 August 1996
In the mid-seventies, the American music business was shaken out of its complacency by the eccentric sounds of artists like Jonathan Richman. But it was when the anarchic style was picked up in Britain by bands including the Sex Pistols and the Clash that the punk revolution really took off. (This was episode nine for the PBS version of the series)
9	"Make It Funky"	10 August 1996
In the seventies, James Brown's musical innovations earned him the sobriquet of the godfather of funk. This episode remembers the revolution he instigated, plus the work of other funk figureheads such as Sly and the Family Stone, Bootsy Collins and George Clinton. (This was episode eight for the PBS version of the series)
10	"The Perfect Beat (PBS) / Planet Rock (BBC)"	17 August 1996
The concluding episode looks at how the passage of time has not compromised music's ability to innovate, excite and induce outrage. With interviews with New Order, Public Enemy, the Beastie Boys, Run DMC and The Orb.

== See also ==
- The History of Rock 'n' Roll, 1995 television documentary series that originally aired on the Prime Time Entertainment Network
- Seven Ages of Rock, 2007 documentary series co-produced by the BBC and VH1 Classic
