= Jonestown: The Life and Death of Peoples Temple =

2006 documentary film

- Film poster
- Directed by: Stanley Nelson
- Written by: Marcia Smith
- Produced by: Stanley Nelson
- Cinematography: Michael Chin
- Music by: Tom Phillips
- Distributed by: Firelight Media; American Experience
- Release date: October 20, 2006
- Running time: 86 minutes
- Country: United States
- Language: English

Jonestown: The Life and Death of Peoples Temple, is a 2006 documentary film made by Firelight Media, produced and directed by Stanley Nelson. The documentary reveals new footage of the incidents surrounding the Peoples Temple and its leader Jim Jones who led over 900 members of his religious group to a settlement in Guyana called Jonestown, where he orchestrated a mass suicide with poisoned Flavor Aid, in November 1978. It is in the form of a narrative with interviews with former Temple members, Jonestown survivors, and people who knew Jones.

== Release ==
The film premiered at the 2006 Tribeca Film Festival where it received the Outstanding Achievement in Documentary award, and was broadcast nationally on Monday, April 9, 2007, on PBS's documentary program "American Experience". The DVD release contains a number of scenes and interviews not in the on-air program.

== Awards ==
- Golden Gate Award for Best Bay Area Feature Documentary, San Francisco International Film Festival
- Outstanding Achievement in Documentary, 2006 Tribeca Film Festival
- Nominee, 2006 International Documentary Association Awards
