= Insignia Films =

- Industry: documentary film, american history
- Founded: 1988
- Headquarters: New York, New York, United States
- Key people: Founder: Stephen Ives; Amanda Pollak
- Owner: Independent
- Website: http://www.insigniafilms.com

Insignia Films is a documentary film company, with its headquarters in New York City. The film company was founded in 1988 by Stephen Ives, with producer Amanda Pollak joining in 2001. Insignia Films has earned a particular reputation as one of the country’s foremost producers of historical documentaries. From America’s conquest of the West to the controversial role of the press in wartime to the amazing career of the Depression-era thoroughbred Seabiscuit, the nation’s history has been repeatedly and vividly brought to life by Insignia’s innovative approach to filmmaking.

Dedicated to dynamic storytelling that entertains and inspires even as it informs, their work has garnered consistent critical acclaim and has been honored with recognition from the Academy of Television Arts and Sciences, the Director’s and Writer’s Guilds of America, and film festivals nationwide.

== Films ==
Title	Year
Lindbergh	(1990)
The West	(1996)
Cornerstone	(1999)
Amato: A Love Affair with Opera	(2001)
Seabiscuit	(2003)
Reporting America at War	(2003)
Las Vegas: An Unconventional History	(2005)
New Orleans	(2007)
Kit Carson	(2008)
Roads to Memphis	(2010)
Panama Canal	(2011)
Custer's Last Stand	(2012)
Grand Coulee Dam	(2012)
Constitution USA	(2013)
1964	(2014)
The Big Burn	(2015)
Space Men	(2016)
The Great War	(2017)
Sealab	(2017)
Beatrix Farrand's American Landscapes	(2019)
Into the Canyon	(2019)
Ailey	(2021)
Citizen Hearst	(2021)
