= David O. Ives =

American television executive (1919–2003)

- Born: David Otis Ives; April 21, 1919; Salem, Massachusetts, U.S.
- Died: May 16, 2003 (aged 84); San Francisco, California, U.S.
- Education: Milton Academy; Harvard University (BA, MBA)
- Occupation: Television executive
- Children: Stephen

David Otis Ives (April 21, 1919 – May 16, 2003) was an American television executive who was president of Boston's WGBH from 1970 to 1984, and was a chairman of its board until 2001. Under his presidency the station produced such series as Nova, The French Chef, The Victory Garden and Masterpiece Theatre. Ives received the Ralph Lowell Award from the Corporation for Public Broadcasting in 1985, and the Governor's Award from the New England chapter of the National Academy of Television Arts and Sciences in 1988.

Ives was born in Salem, Massachusetts, and attended Milton Academy and Harvard University, where he received a B.A. in 1941 and an M.B.A. in 1943. After six years in the U.S. Navy he became a reporter for The Salem Evening News and later The Wall Street Journal, where he worked until 1958. He joined WGBH in 1960 as director of development. He died in San Francisco, aged 84. He has two sons.
