= Marcus Garvey: Look For Me in the Whirlwind =

Marcus Garvey: Look For Me in the Whirlwind is a 2001 television documentary. It was produced by Firelight Media for the PBS series American Experience. The film chronicles the rise and fall of Marcus Garvey, a Jamaican national who emigrated to the United States as a laborer in 1917 to then become the leader of the largest black organization in history. After 10 years in the United States, he was arrested and deported. The film includes interviews with people who were a part of Garvey's revolutionary movement.

== Awards ==
- 2002 Best Documentary, Black International Cinema
- 2001 Sundance Film Festival documentary competition
- 2000 Black Filmmakers Hall of Fame, 1st Place Overall Winner
