= Vietnam: A Television History =

- Written by: Martin Smith; Elizabeth Deane; Richard Ellison; Marilyn Mellowes; Bruce Palling; Judith Vecchione; Austin Hoyt; Andrew Pearson
- Directed by: Judith Vecchione; Austin Hoyt; Martin Smith; Bruce Palling
- Narrated by: Will Lyman
- Country of origin: United States
- Original language: English
- No. of episodes: 13 (1983 version); 11 (1997 version and 2004 DVD release)

Production
- Running time: 780 min (1983 version); 660 min (1997 version and 2004 DVD release)
- Production companies: WGBH-TV; Central Independent Television; Antenne-2

Original release
- Network: PBS
- Release: October 4 – December 20, 1983

Vietnam: A Television History (1983) is a 13-part documentary mini-series about the Vietnam War (1955–1975) from the perspective of the United States. It was produced for public television by WGBH-TV in Boston, Central Independent Television of the UK and Antenne-2 of France. It was originally broadcast on PBS between October 4 and December 20, 1983.

Later, it was rebroadcast as part of the PBS series American Experience from May 26 to July 28, 1997. However, only 11 of the 13 original episodes were rebroadcast. Episodes 2 and 13 were dropped.

Vietnam: A Television History was the most successful documentary produced by PBS up to the time of initial broadcast. Nearly 9% of American households watched the initial episode, and an average of 9.7 million viewers watched each of the 13 episodes. A rebroadcast in the summer of 1984 garnered roughly a 4% share in the five largest U.S. television markets.

== Production ==
The origins of the series reach back to 1977 when PBS President Lawrence K. Grossman, filmmaker Richard Ellison, and foreign correspondent Stanley Karnow discussed the project. Karnow had been a journalist in Paris during the 1950s and a reporter in Southeast Asia from 1959 to 1974. He became Chief Correspondent and Historical Advisor for the series, and his tie-in book, Vietnam: A History (1983), became a best-seller.

== Episodes ==
No.	Title	Directed by	Written by	Original release date	Rebroadcast
1	"Roots of a War (1945–1953)"	Judith Vecchione	Herself	October 4, 1983	May 26, 1997
The initial episode deals with the history of Vietnam up to 1954. By 1885 the French were in control of Indochina and over the next 20 years or so pacified the population. Central to the 20th century history of Vietnam is Ho Chi Minh. Ho moved to Paris in 1917 and joined the Communist Party in 1920. He began formal training in 1923. Imperial Japan landed forces in Vietnam after France capitulated to the Germans in June 1940 and he founded the Viet Minh in 1941 which was both anti-French and anti-Japanese. The US actually trained the Viet Minh for the war against the Japanese but with their sudden defeat in 1945, Ho declared independence. The French returned in March 1946 for a limited period but the country is soon divided into North and South. The war begins leading to a Vietnamese victory at the epic 55-day Battle of Dien Bien Phu in early 1954. The subsequent Geneva Accords of July 1954 called for a reunification election in two years.
2	"The First Vietnam War"	Judith Vecchione	Herself	October 5, 1983	—
Examines the First Indochina War (1946–54) that led to a French defeat by Ho Chi Minh's Viet Minh.
3	"America's Mandarin (1954–1963)"	Elizabeth Deane	Herself	October 11, 1983	May 26, 1997
After the division of Vietnam into North and South the North is seen as a Communist threat by the United States. South Vietnam's Prime Minister, Ngo Dinh Diem, faced a 2-year deadline for a nationwide reunification vote and the US feared that Diem might not win. Diem's advisers had a dim view of the future as well, believing a Communist victory was inevitable. After the division of the country many Vietnamese Catholics, estimated at 900,000, fled to the South. Diem and his brother, who headed the intelligence service, demolished their opponents in the South and created an air of mistrust that would continue far into the future. By the late 1950s Diem relied more and more on his family to help run the country. The Communist forces in the South, the Viet Cong, became a serious threat with rising opposition to Diem. The self-immolation of monk Thích Quảng Đức and ongoing protests led to the 1963 South Vietnamese coup on November 2, 1963 and the death of Diem just a few weeks prior to the assassination of JFK.
4	"LBJ Goes to War (1964–1965)"	Austin Hoyt	Himself	October 18, 1983	June 2, 1997
When LBJ became President there were some 16,000 advisers in South Vietnam and some of those were involved in combat. The President's main concern at the time was the War on Poverty and the building of what he called the Great Society. The strategic hamlets that were built by the South Vietnamese government were being destroyed, often with the help of those lived there. Hanoi decided to escalate the war and Johnson found himself in an election against a conservative candidate. He was under pressure not to relent in the fight against Communism. On August 4, 1964, the USS Maddox was attacked in the Gulf of Tonkin (though some now question the veracity of the reports around that incident). The US Congress passed the Gulf of Tonkin Resolution that essentially authorized the President to make war. Johnson ordered the bombing of the North, in an operation called Rolling Thunder. A series of attacks in Saigon - the explosion at the Brinks hotel; four days later, a major attack on the South Vietnamese army; and then an attack on Pleiku - led to the first request for additional US troops to protect the three jet-capable US airfields. On March 8, 1965, 3500 Marines landed at Da Nang and by the end of the year, there would be 200,000 American troops in Vietnam.
5	"America Takes Charge (1965–1967)"	Andrew Pearson	Himself	October 25, 1983	June 9, 1997
The first years of involvement by US combat troops is seen through the eyes of both American soldiers and everyday Vietnamese people. In the early days, there was strong support from the American public as America took charge of the war. By the end of 1965, there were 200,000 troops on the ground in Vietnam. The North Vietnamese Army (NVA) was in control of large parts of South Vietnam and the Army of the Republic of Vietnam (ARVN) wasn't seen as reliable. Soldiers, once eager, were now beginning to question their role in Vietnam and began to question if they could ever win. Guerrillas traveled light while they carried 50 lbs of gear but their superior equipment seemed to be having little effect. Interviews with soldiers and survivors of the Thuy Bo massacre are conducted. The bombing in the North, Operation Rolling Thunder, continued but did not achieve the hoped for objective. After 3 years, the US had won many battles but not yet the war.
6	"America's Enemy (1954–1967)"	Martin Smith	Himself	November 1, 1983	June 16, 1997
Under the 1954 Geneva peace accords, reunification elections were to be held in Vietnam within two years. Prime Minister Diem rejected the election promise and took excessive steps to repress any opponents. The strategic hamlets were not welcome by the peasant population and by 1964, supplies were flowing south along the Ho Chi Minh trail. Viet Cong guerrillas supported by the Army of North Vietnam attacked American installations in Saigon. The bombing of the North started in 1965 in reaction to the Gulf of Tonkin incident. The Marines that began arriving in 1965 were not seen as liberators by the people. The North launched a major attack in 1965 on the airbase at Da Nang. It was eventually recognized that the bombing campaign, Operation Rolling Thunder, had failed.
7	"Tet 1968"	Austin Hoyt	Himself	November 8, 1983	June 23, 1997
The year 1968 was to be a new year for US efforts in Vietnam. Reports from the Embassy said that they were winning the ground war but American TV reports were showing a different picture altogether. The Tet Offensive showed to what extent the Johnson Administration's status reports on the war differed from reality. There was a major attack on Khe Sanh several days before Tet. The New Year's attack was the biggest offensive of the war, with Viet Cong (VC) and regulars from the North Vietnamese Army (NVA) attacking nearly every province and district capital in Vietnam. The attack on the U.S. Embassy in Saigon was the greatest shock with opposing troops managing to breach the security perimeter. Elsewhere in Saigon, VC and NVA troops gained control of the main Vietnamese language radio station. The battle for Hue, the ancient capital, lasted 24 days and the city was destroyed in the process, leaving 75% of the people homeless. While the Tet Offensive did not meet the North's expectations, the US realized that after three years in control of the fighting in Vietnam, they found itself in a war that was deadlocked. When news leaked that the military had requested an additional 206,000 troops, street demonstrations sprung up across America. It also led to an increase in popularity for a peace candidate, Senator Eugene McCarthy, who nearly defeated President Johnson in the New Hampshire primary. On March 31, 1968 President Johnson made a televised speech about peace in Vietnam and announced a halt to the bombing. He also announced he would not seek re-election.
8	"Vietnamizing the War (1968–1973)"	Martin Smith	Himself	November 15, 1983	June 30, 1997
By Christmas 1969, American troops were being withdrawn under President Nixon's policy of having more of the ground fighting transferred to the South Vietnamese army. That year as many as 4000 South Vietnamese soldiers were being killed every week. The South Vietnamese government was recognized by most countries in the West and had survived for 15 years on more than $100 billion in US aid. At its peak, US troops numbered 500,000. The Vietnamese economy was overheated and the black market and prostitution thrived. The Paris peace talks had not stopped the bombing in South Vietnam as forces attempted to eliminate the Viet Cong but many native South Vietnamese were fighting for the VC. In two years the number of American troops were reduced by over 300,000. In 1969, more than 9,000 Americans were killed in Vietnam; the following year that number was cut in half. South Vietnamese President Thieu was not popular and protests began against his government. The anti-war sentiment was growing however among US troops and morale was low. There were 200 fragging incidents in 1970 and racial polarization among US troops was a major issue. In May 1972 the North invaded and the South Vietnamese were having a difficult time without US troops. President Nixon reacted by mining Haiphong harbor. In October 1972, the US reached an agreement with North, one that was not supported by Thieu.
9	"Cambodia and Laos"	Bruce Palling	Himself	November 22, 1983	July 7, 1997
The Pathet Lao in Laos were supported by the North Vietnamese who transported supplies south through Laos. The Kennedy Administration wanted to ensure a neutral Laos and to ensure that organized the Hmong hill tribes. In 1961, Laos was the major crisis center in Southeast Asia. In March 1964, the US organized a secret bombing campaign in Laos using unmarked planes and targeting the Ho Chi Minh trail. In 1964, Cambodia was still at peace and Prince Norodom Sihanouk attempted to maintain his State's neutrality. The country prospered with an abundance of rice and fish and nearly 90% of peasants owned their own land. In 1963 Sihanouk, afraid that the situation in Vietnam might spill over into his country, organized anti-American propaganda and by 1966, Cambodia had maintained its neutrality and had broken off relations with the United States. American aircraft often pursued the enemy across the border into Cambodia and in 1970 President Nixon launched major bombing attacks on Cambodian territory. In January 1970, Sihanouk left on a trip and in March 1970 army officers ousted him with Lon Nol leading a new government. Sihanouk, now in exile in China, declared his support for the Khmer Rouge. Nixon ordered troops to attack North Vietnamese enclave along the Vietnamese/Cambodian border. The US pulled out after 60 days as promised with 350 dead Americans. Cambodia was plunged into full-scale war as the Khmer Rouge moved into the interior. On April 12, 1975 Americans were evacuated and less than a week later, Phnom Penh fell.
10	"Peace is at Hand (1968–1973)"	Martin Smith	Himself	November 29, 1983	July 14, 1997
By early 1968, the US had dropped nearly 3 million tons of bombs on Vietnam. After the Tet offensive, President Johnson ordered a stop to the bombing and peace talks began in Paris. Some thought the negotiations would be swift but there was little of the give and take that you would normally expect. Nixon had won the 1968 election by a narrow margin and 500,000 American troops were still in Vietnam at that point. After Tet, fighting had again shifted to the countryside and in the first half of 1969, 200 Americans were killed and 800 wounded every week. Nixon introduced the policy of Vietnamizing the war, that is transferring the ground and air war to the Vietnamese themselves. By April 1970 US Forces in Vietnam had been reduced by more than 100,000, well ahead of schedule. Campus protests however reached a peak in 1970 with 4 students being killed by National Guardsmen at Kent State University in Ohio. National polls showed that a majority of Americans still supported the administration. Nixon proposed a ceasefire but Hanoi's leaders did not respond. Unknown to everyone, including the South Vietnamese, was that Henry Kissinger was in secret talks with the North since 1969. The North launched a major attack on March 31, 1972 across the DMZ and as a result, Nixon stepped up the bombing of the North and mined Haiphong harbor. A breakthrough was reached at the Paris peace negotiations in October 1972 when the North dropped its demand that the Thieu government resign. A draft treaty was soon agreed to but rejected by Thieu. The Christmas 1972 bombings of the North led to a final agreement, one with little difference from the October version. Former President Johnson died the day before the agreement was initialed by Kissinger and Le Duc Tho on January 23, 1973.
11	"Homefront USA"	Elizabeth Deane	Herself	December 6, 1983	July 21, 1997
Anti-war protests began early in the Johnson administration though the vast majority of Americans at the time supported the administration. The initial protests were led by civil rights activists, the old left, women's groups and the clergy. Religious organizations had a difficult time as they were conservative by nature. As well, college students could avoid the draft if they remained in school. Blacks were joining the military but activists decried those who claimed they were trying to save people of color. Passive resistance and draft card burning were increasing. The October 1967 march on the Pentagon was denounced as anti-American as were most protests against the war. However, 55,000 participated and over 600 were arrested. The climate soon began to change. Johnson had to raise taxes and the economy was doing poorly and by December 1967 a poll showed that a majority of Americans now thought the war was a mistake. Senator Eugene McCarthy became popular by proposing an end to the war. He nearly defeated Johnson in the New Hampshire primary and his success led to Bobby Kennedy's entry into the Presidential race. Martin Luther King spoke out against the war and riots broke out across the US after his assassination. The Chicago protests at the Democratic convention and the police response led to bloodshed on all sides. During the election, Nixon attacked Humphrey based on his support of Johnson's war policies. Every Thursday, the number of Americans killed in Vietnam was released to the media. Nixon won the election by a slim margin and the Vice President Spiro Agnew began attacking the media as biased. Soon however, the public learned of the massacre at My Lai and even Vietnam Veterans began protesting the war.
12	"The End of the Tunnel (1973–1975)"	Elizabeth Deane	Herself	December 13, 1983	July 28, 1997
On January 23, 1973 Nixon announced a cease fire, the return of all POWs, the complete withdrawal of forces from the country, all within 60 days. Many South Vietnamese were furious, seeing this as a death sentence. Most Americans now believed that the cost of the war, particularly in lives, was too great. The public cheered the return of POWs, a month-long celebration that played out on TV. Nixon had pledged support should the North launch a full-scale invasion, but he was now distracted by the Watergate scandal. He ended the draft and brought the troops home, but opposition to his policies continued, now centered in Congress which wanted to limit his authority and imposed a halt to the bombing of Cambodia in August 1973. Forced from office, Nixon was replaced by Gerald R. Ford who committed to continue his predecessor's policies, but by August the military balance had shifted against Thieu. The South lacked US air support, had problems with the ammunition supply and spare parts for aircraft. South Vietnamese corruption was a major, though little discussed, problem. In 1972, 31,000 South Vietnamese soldiers had died and leaders in the North concluded there was nothing the US could do to stem the tide. The invasion of the South in 1975 was at least in part a test of US resolve. Congress refused to approve additional funds. A North Vietnamese feint lured the South Vietnamese to defend Pleiku in the highlands but, unsuccessful, they were forced to go further south and set a new line of defense. Da Nang fell on March 30, 1975 and the hysteria there filtered south. Curfews were imposed in Saigon and Americans prepared to leave, but the evacuation created chaos. On April 21, 1975, Thieu resigned and on the 28th Northern troops entered the city, which fell on the 30th. The North, which had given itself two years to gain control of the South, had done so in only 55 days.
13	"Legacies"	Richard Ellison	Himself	December 20, 1983	—
Examines the legacy of the Vietnam War from the end of fighting up to 1983.

== Edited 1997 version ==
When PBS elected to rebroadcast Vietnam: A Television History (originally broadcast in 1983) as part of its American Experience series in 1997, it used a re-edited version some 120 minutes shorter (a total of 660 minutes, as opposed to 780 minutes). This version excluded entirely Episodes 2 ("The First Vietnam War") and 13 ("Legacies") of the original broadcast.

The editing was reportedly undertaken to remove outdated information and to create a more cohesive story for viewers. However, some viewers who remembered the original 13-episode version denigrated the changes as "censorship": they believed that they could detect a "corrective" treatment of the material that involved cutting out politically objectionable scenes; an interview of a French captain discussing the end of the siege at Dien Bien Phu and referring to the Viet Minh as "Red Termites"; an interview of a man recalling a popular expression of that time and place in which the native plantation workers were termed "fertilizer" because so many died and were buried beneath the trees among which they toiled; and material depicting the British decision to rearm defeated Japanese soldiers at the end of World War II to use them against the Vietnamese. No evidence was presented that PBS executives edited the series for political purposes.

Additionally, the use of the shortened 1997 broadcast version for the 2004 DVD release of the series–rather than the entire, original 1983 version–has not been explained.

== Reception ==
=== Critical response ===
The New York Times described the series as "determinedly even-handed" and "delicately balanced"; it concluded that the production was "a landmark in television journalism". It observed that "the documentary implies that the peace movement, unsupported by most Americans, had little effect on the conduct of the war. Indeed, by attacking Hubert H. Humphrey, it probably elected Richard M. Nixon. This seems to have been its most significant contribution to American history... In a curious way, the documentary also suggests that American hawks and doves were right and wrong in equal measure." The critic, however, took the filmmakers to task for some "weaknesses in the reportorial technique." The film also received very positive reviews from The Washington Post, Variety, Time, and Newsweek. The latter two hailed the series as fair, brilliant, and objective.

The series aired in the UK to good reviews, but did not receive the high ratings achieved in the U.S.

The series won six Emmy Awards, a Peabody Award, a George Polk Award, a DuPont-Columbia Award, and an Erik Barnouw Award.

=== Criticism ===
The film Television's Vietnam: The Real Story (1985), aired on the PBS network as a rebuttal to the documentary. It was narrated by Charlton Heston and produced by Accuracy in Media.

== See also ==
- Vietnam: The Ten Thousand Day War, a 1980 Canadian television documentary about the Vietnam War which was produced by Michael Maclear
- The Vietnam War (TV series), a 2017 documentary series which was also produced by PBS
