= The Great War (2017 film) =

- Directed by: Stephen Ives; Amanda Pollak; Rob Rapley
- Music by: Tom Phillips; Peter Rundquist
- Country of origin: United States
- Original language: English

Production
- Running time: 360 min (three 120 min episodes)

Original release
- Network: PBS
- Release: April 10 – April 12, 2017

The Great War is a 2017 American documentary film directed by Stephen Ives, Amanda Pollak and Rob Rapley. It is based on World War I (1914–18) and focuses especially on the United States' 20-month experience (April 1917 – November 1918) of deploying to the European theater.

The film premiered to coincide with the centennial anniversary of the United States entry into the war on April 6, 1917. The three-part film aired on the PBS network series American Experience during April 10–12, 2017.

== See also ==
- World War One - CBS production (1964–65)
- The Great War - BBC, Canadian Broadcasting Corporation, and Imperial War Museums co-production (1964)
- The World at War - Thames Television production (1973)
- The Great War and the Shaping of the 20th Century - BBC and KCET co-production (1996)
