= Firelight Media =

- Industry: Film
- Genre: Documentaries
- Founded: 1998
- Founder: Stanley Nelson; Marcia Smith
- Headquarters: New York, NY, U.S.A.
- Website: www.firelightmedia.org

Firelight Media is a non-profit filmmaking company founded by filmmaker Stanley Nelson and Marcia Smith. The company is located in New York City.

== History ==
Firelight Media began in 1998 as an independent non-profit documentary production company that produced stories on topics that are typically underrepresented in the mainstream media, with most films airing nationally on PBS. In 2008, Firelight Media transitioned to focusing on supporting emerging filmmakers, while Firelight Films was launched as the new for-profit documentary production company led by Stanley Nelson.

== The Documentary Lab ==
The Documentary Lab is the flagship program of Firelight Media. It is an 18-month fellowship program that offers support to emerging filmmakers of color to complete their films and gain national distribution. Participants receive a $25,000 grant toward their projects as well as customized mentorship from prominent leaders in the documentary world, professional development workshops, and networking opportunities.

== Firelight Media films ==
- Freedom Bags (1990)
- Schools for A New Society (1993)
- Puerto Rico: A Right to Choose (1994)
- The Black Press: Soldiers Without Swords (1999)
- Marcus Garvey: Look for Me in the Whirlwind (2000)
- Running the Campaign for City Council (2002)
- The Murder of Emmett Till (2003)
- A Place of Our Own (2004)
- Beyond Brown: Pursuing the Promise (2004)
- Sweet Honey in the Rock: Raise Your Voice (2005)
- Faces of Change (2005)
- Jonestown: The Life and Death of Peoples Temple (2006)
- CNN Presents High Stakes (2006)
- Wounded Knee (2009)
- Immigration Part 1: Battleground Arizona (2009)
- Immigration Part II: Raid in New Bedford (2009)
- Immigration Part III: Guest Workers in the Gulf (2009)
- Arise: the Battle over Affirmative Action (2010)
- Freedom Riders (2010)
