= Hugh Thomson (writer) =

British travel writer, filmmaker and explorer

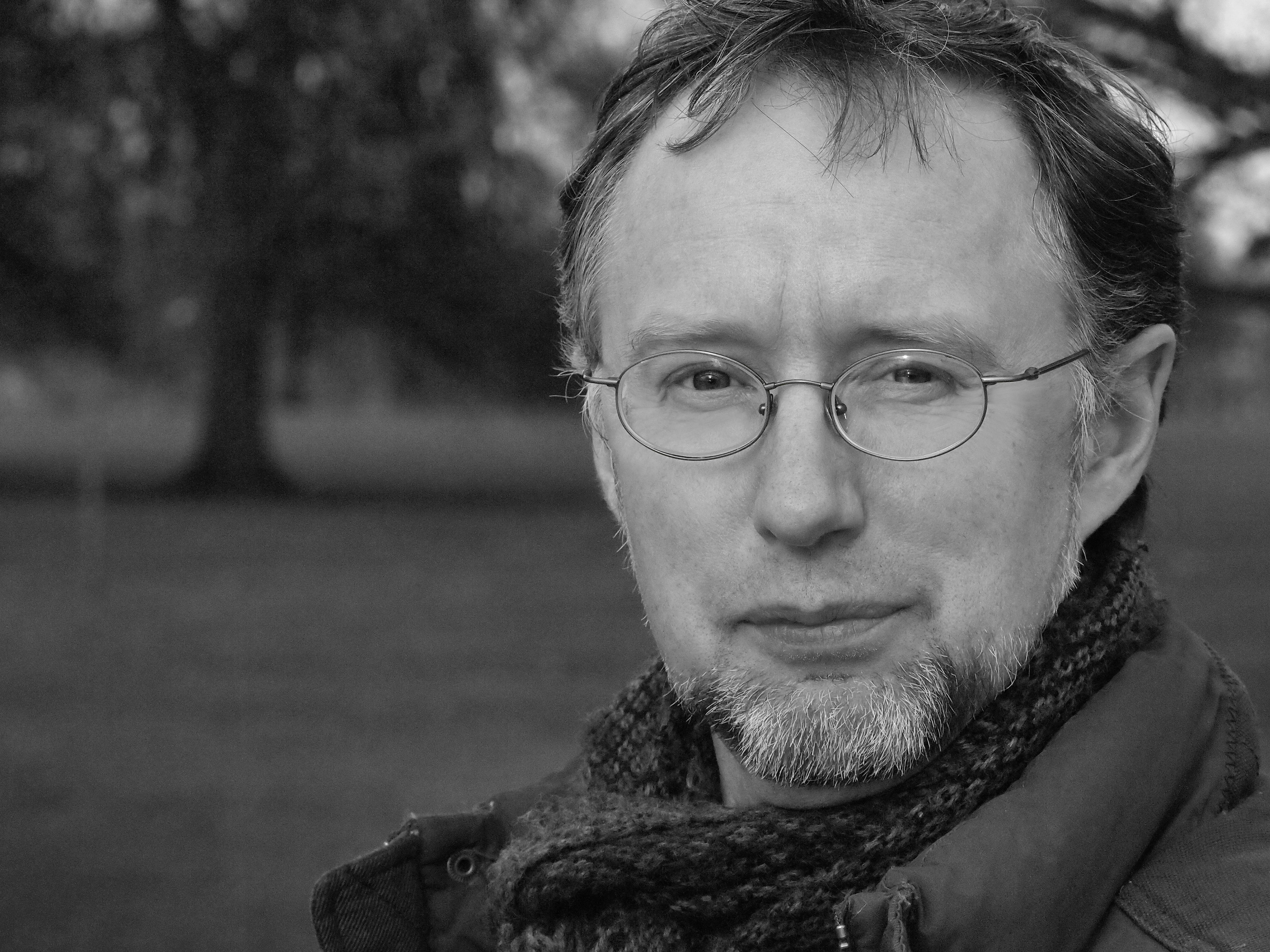
- Alma mater: University of Cambridge
- Occupations: Writer, filmmaker, explorer
- Relatives: G. P. Thomson (grandfather); W. L. Bragg (grandfather); J. J. Thomson (great-grandfather); W. H. Bragg (great-grandfather)
- Writing career
- Notable awards: 2014 Wainwright Prize for nature and travel writing
- Website: www.thewhiterock.co.uk

Hugh Thomson FRGS is a British travel writer, filmmaker and explorer. His The Green Road into the Trees: A Walk Through England won the 2014 Wainwright Prize for nature and travel writing.

== Early life and education ==
He has an MA from the University of Cambridge. His grandfathers were G. P. Thomson and W. L. Bragg, both of whom, and both their fathers J. J. Thomson and W. H. Bragg, won the Nobel Prize in Physics.

== Explorer and filmmaker ==
He has led research expeditions in Peru exploring Inca settlements, including the discovery of Cota Coca in 2002 and a 2003 study of Llaqtapata. He has also led filming expeditions to Mount Kilimanjaro, Bhutan, Afghanistan, and Mexico.

Thomson is also a film maker: his Dancing in the Street: A Rock and Roll History television documentary series was nominated for the Huw Wheldon Award For The Best Arts Programme or Series in the 1997 BAFTA awards and the three-part Indian Journeys he created with William Dalrymple won the 2001 Grierson Award for Best Documentary Series.

== Writing ==
Of his first book, The White Rock: An Exploration of the Inca Heartland, The New York Times wrote that "He believes that Peru is one of the last places where we can satisfy a deeply primitive need to discover the unknown."

The sequel Cochineal Red (published as A Sacred Landscape: The Search for Ancient Peru in the United States) described his exploration and discovery of important Inca ruins, and the long history of Peruvian culture before the Incas.

In Tequila Oil: Getting Lost in Mexico Thomson described how he bought an Oldsmobile 98 when 18 years old and drove it from Texas through Mexico, despite having no licence, insurance or number plates. It was serialised by BBC Radio 4.

For Nanda Devi: A Journey to the Last Sanctuary, he travelled to one of the highest mountains in India, in the Himalaya, which was usually off-limits to travellers. According to The Daily Telegraph "This is a region of supreme spiritual significance, the foothills and mountains connected by ancient trails that criss-cross the myriad sources of the Ganges river." The book includes "pilgrims, politics and mountaineering mythology." It was only published in India in 2017 after a delay due to concerns about the revelations about the joint CIA/Indian missions to leave nuclear powered spying devices on the summit.

For The Green Road into the Trees, he aimed to "explore England as if it were a foreign country". The book won the inaugural Wainwright Prize for Best Nature and Travel Writing in 2014.

In the following One Man And A Mule, Thomson fostered a mule that had been abandoned and left with the RSPCA, and travelled with him across England on the Coast to Coast path. Anthony Sattin in The Observer pointed out that "Mules are not the only things that have disappeared from our countryside and Thomson takes on the issues: the curse of EU subsidies that leave fields bare, the hardships of sheep farming, the breakdown of rural community life and the increasing restrictions of access to land that we could all have walked across not so long ago."

His first novel, Viva Byron!, was published in 2025 and imagines what might have happened if Byron had not died an early death in Greece but instead travelled to South America, as he always wanted to do.

== Awards ==
Thomson is a Fellow of the Royal Geographical Society. He was appointed as a Royal Literary Fund fellow at Oxford Brookes University in 2012–2014.

== Publications ==
=== Non Fiction ===
- The White Rock: An Exploration of the Inca Heartland (2001, Weidenfeld & Nicolson, ISBN 9780297842446)
- Nanda Devi: A Journey to the Last Sanctuary (2004, Weidenfeld & Nicolson, ISBN 9780297607533)
- Cochineal Red: Travels Through Ancient Peru (2006, Weidenfeld & Nicolson, ISBN 9780297645641)
  - A Sacred Landscape: The Search for Ancient Peru (2007, Overlook, ISBN 978-1-58567-901-0. US edition.
- Tequila Oil: Getting Lost in Mexico (2009, Weidenfeld & Nicolson, ISBN 9780297851929)
- 50 Wonders of the World (2009, Quercus, ISBN 9781849160032)
- The Green Road into the Trees: An Exploration of England (2012, Preface) ISBN 9781848093324)

- The Green Road into the Trees: A Walk Through England. Paperback.

- One Man and a Mule: Across England with a Pack Mule (2017, Preface, ISBN 1848094698)
- The Map Tour (2018, Andre Deutsch) ISBN 978-0-233-00556-0

=== Fiction ===
- Viva Byron! (2025, Castle & Maine, ISBN 9781068634239)

=== Kindle specials ===
- At the Captain"s Table: Life on a Luxury Liner
- Two Men and a Mule: To the Last City of the Incas From the BBC Radio Four series, co-presented with Benedict Allen

=== Catalogues and editions ===
- Lost City of the Incas Hiram Bingham, with introduction Hugh Thomson (2002, Weidenfeld & Nicolson) ISBN 978-1-84212-585-4
- Machu Picchu and the Camera, (2002), Penchant ISBN 978-0-9543756-0-7 to accompany the British Museum exhibition of the same name.
- Travelling with Cortes and Pizarro, illustrated, with essays by Hugh Thomson (2018, Five Continents) ISBN 978-88-7439-808-9
- Historical Peru (2019, Horizon Guides)
