= 1964 (film) =

2014 documentary film about key events in 1964 America

- Written by: Stephen Ives
- Directed by: Stephen Ives
- Narrated by: Oliver Platt
- Music by: Peter Rundquist
- Country of origin: United States
- Original language: English

Production
- Producer: Amanda Pollak
- Cinematography: Andrew Young; Haskell Wexler
- Editors: George O’Donnell; Amy Foote
- Running time: 1 hour 54 minutes
- Production company: Insignia Films

Original release
- Network: PBS
- Release: January 2015

1964 is a documentary film produced by Insignia Films for PBS' American Experience series about political, social, and cultural events in the United States for the calendar year 1964. It is based partly on the Jon Margolis book The Last Innocent Year: America in 1964. The documentary depicts the year 1964 as significant and epic in that following the assassination of President John F. Kennedy in late 1963, 1964, as a presidential election year, becomes a departure point for American history, with lasting effects today. It is also the year of the British Invasion led by the Beatles, when Cassius Clay fights Sonny Liston for the World Heavyweight Championship, the year after Betty Friedan's book, The Feminine Mystique, is published, and the year Republican activist, Phyllis Schlafly's book, A Choice, Not an Echo, is published. It is also the year of Freedom Summer, an initiative by the Student Nonviolent Coordinating Committee to register African-Americans in Mississippi, the subsequent murders of Chaney, Goodman, and Schwerner, three CORE activists, in Mississippi by white supremacists that created a national sensation, and the Harlem riot of 1964, culminating in the Berkeley Free Speech Movement at the University of California at Berkeley. A recurrent theme of the film is its departure as a presidential election year, with President Lyndon B. Johnson running as the expected Democratic Party nominee and the nomination of U.S. Senator Barry Goldwater selected through a grassroots campaign for the Republican nomination for President of the United States, that defines the future divisions of the US political party competition.

The 1964 interviews were conducted in 2014 and made accessible online in the American Archive of Public Broadcasting in 2018.

== Commentators ==
- Mark Kurlansky – writer
- Lee Edwards – historian – part of 1964 Goldwater Campaign
- Jon Margolis – author of The Last Innocent Year: America in 1964
- Leah Wright Rigueur – historian
- Rick Perlstein - writer
- Hodding Carter III – newspaper editor of family newspaper, The Delta-Democrat Times of Greenville, Mississippi
- Robert A. Caro – author
- Robert Dallek – historian
- Dan T. Carter - historian
- Claire Bond Potter – historian
- Stephanie Coontz – historian
- Susan J. Douglas – historian
- Richard A. Viguerie - conservative political activist
- Phyllis Schlafly – President of Illinois Federation of Republican Women, an office she has held since 1960
- John H. Bracey, Jr. – historian
- Jann S. Wenner – founder of Rolling Stone magazine
- Reverend Ed King – civil rights activist
- Dave Dennis – civil rights activist (close friends with James Baldwin's brother)
