= Erik Barnouw Award =

American award for US history programming

The Erik Barnouw Award—also known as the OAH Erik Barnouw Award—is named after the late Erik Barnouw, a Columbia University historian and professor who was a specialist in mass media. The OAH -- Organization of American Historians -- gives one or two awards annually to recognize excellent programs, from mass media or documentary films, that relate to American history or further its study. The award was first presented in 1983.

== List of winners ==
- 1983 – Brooklyn Bridge
- 1984 – Vietnam: A Television History
- 1985 – Solomon Northup's Odyssey / The Legacy of Harry Truman
- 1986 – Huey Long
- 1987 – no award
- 1988 – Radio Bikini / The Secret Government: The Constitution in Crisis
- 1989 – Indians, Outlaws and Angie Debo
- 1990 – Adam Clayton Powell
- 1991 – Eyes on the Prize
- 1992 – Coney Island / Color Adjustment
- 1993 – In the White Man's Image
- 1994 – At the River I Stand
- 1995 – Freedom on My Mind
- 1996 – America's War
- 1997 – The West
- 1998 – The Richest Man in the World: Andrew Carnegie
- 1999 - A Paralyzing Fear: The Story of Polio in America
- 2000 - I’ll Make Me a World: A Century of African-American Art
- 2001 - Freedom Never Dies: The Legacy of Harry T. Moore
- 2002 - Scottsboro: An American Tragedy
- 2003 - The Good War and Those Who Refused to Fight It
- 2004 - Partners of the Heart
- 2005 - Reconstruction: the Second Civil War
- 2006 - Negroes with Guns: Rob Williams and Black Power
- 2007 - The Gold Rush
- 2008 - Through Deaf Eyes
- 2009 - Wings of Defeat
- 2010 - Passage
- 2011 - The Most Dangerous Man in America: Daniel Ellsberg and the Pentagon Papers
- 2012 - The Pruitt-Igoe Myth
- 2013 - Death and the Civil War
- 2014 - Honor & Sacrifice: The Roy Matsumoto Story
- 2015 - The Roosevelts: An Intimate History
- 2016 - No más bebés
- 2017 - The Mine Wars
- 2018 - The Vietnam War
- 2019 - The Chinese Exclusion Act
- 2020 - Chasing the Moon
- 2021 - The People Vs. Agent Orange
- 2022 - Look Away, Look Away
- 2023 - The Rebellious Life of Mrs. Rosa Parks
- 2024 - Atomic Cover-Up
- 2025 - The Riot Report
- 2026 - Bombshell
