= Clinton (film) =

- Written by: Barak Goodman
- Directed by: Barak Goodman
- Starring: Bill Clinton
- Narrated by: Campbell Scott
- Country of origin: United States
- Original language: English

Original release
- Network: PBS
- Release: February 20, 2012

Clinton is a biographical film about former President Bill Clinton. Produced by PBS for the series of American Experience, the film documents Clinton's life, from childhood until the end of his second term in 2001. Clinton features interviews with political advisers, campaign strategists, and childhood friends. The film is narrated by Campbell Scott. It was released in 2012.

== Production ==
The film is part of the American Experience series: "The Presidents".

== Cast ==
- James Carville
- Joe Klein
- Harold Ickes
- John Harris
- Dick Morris
- Michael Waldman
- Connie Chung
- Carol Willis
- Gail Sheehy
- Robert Reich
- Bernard W. Nussbaum
- David Maraniss
- Carolyn Staley
- Joe Purvis
- Nigel Hamilton
- William Chafe
- Paul Fray
- John Brummett
- Bobby Roberts
- Max Brantley
- Maria Crider
- Ernie Dumas
- Frank White
- Betsey Wright
- Christiane Amanpour
- Kofi Annan

== Music ==
The sound recordists of the movie are:

- Len Schmitz
- Bob Freeman
- Tommy Alford
- David Settlemoir
- Roger Phenix
- Doug Dunderdale
- Adrienne Wade
