= American Experience =

PBS documentary television series

- Also known as: The American Experience (1988–)
- Genre: Television documentary
- Created by: Peter McGhee
- Theme music composer: Charles Kuskin (1988–2000); Mark Adler (2000–2008); The Chambers Brothers (2009–2010); Joel Goodman (2011–present)
- Country of origin: United States
- Original language: English (United States)
- No. of seasons: 37
- No. of episodes: 388 (list of episodes)

Production
- Executive producers: Judy Crichton (1987–1996); Margaret Drain (1997–2003); Mark Samels (2003–2020); Susan Bellows (2020); Cameo George (2020–2026); Raney Aronson-Rath (2026–present)
- Running time: Between 55 minutes and three hours
- Production company: WGBH-TV

Original release
- Network: PBS
- Release: October 4, 1988 – present

American Experience is a television program airing on the Public Broadcasting Service (PBS) in the United States that presents documentaries about key events and people in American history. The show has several awards, including 30 Emmy Awards.

The series premiered on October 4, 1988, and was originally titled The American Experience. The show has had a presence on the internet since 1995, and more than 100 American Experience programs are accompanied by their own internet websites that provide background information on the subjects covered as well as teachers' guides and educational companion materials. American Experience is produced primarily by WGBH-TV in Boston, Massachusetts, though occasionally in the early seasons it was co-produced by other PBS stations such as WNET (Channel 13) in New York City.

Some of the American Experience programs were produced prior to the formal creation of the series. Vietnam: A Television History was one of them, airing originally in 1983 after six years in development. Also, in 2006, American Experience rebroadcast Eyes on the Prize: America's Civil Rights Years, the first half of the 1986 documentary series about the Civil Rights Movement of the 1950s and 1960s.

In July 2025, WGBH announced that American Experience would end new production and switch exclusively to rereleasing past episodes after airing an abbreviated 37th season that fall and that the series' staff was being laid off. WGBH CEO Susan Goldberg attributed the decision to "severe cuts in federal funding for public media." Work had been halted in May on six films, and no new documentaries will be produced until further notice since this is the "most expensive show funded by PBS" on a per hour basis.

== Episodes ==
Season	Episodes	Originally released	
Season	Episodes	First released	Last released
1	16	October 4, 1988	January 17, 1989
2	15	October 3, 1989	February 12, 1990
3	12	October 1, 1990	May 6, 1991
4	12	September 30, 1991	February 17, 1992
5	15	September 20, 1992	March 1, 1993
6	7	October 27, 1993	May 25, 1994
7	9	October 11, 1994	May 9, 1995
8	9	October 16, 1995	February 26, 1996
9	9	October 6, 1996	July 28, 1997
10	18	October 5, 1997	March 2, 1998
11	13	November 18, 1998	May 17, 1999
12	15	November 14, 1999	May 23, 2000
13	13	October 17, 2000	April 30, 2001
14	14	September 30, 2001	May 12, 2002
15	13	November 11, 2002	July 14, 2003
16	9	September 8, 2003	May 3, 2004
17	12	October 4, 2004	July 4, 2005
18	13	October 17, 2005	May 22, 2006
19	18	October 2, 2006	May 14, 2007
20	18	January 14, 2008	May 6, 2008
21	10	January 26, 2009	May 18, 2009
22	8	November 2, 2009	May 10, 2010
23	12	October 11, 2010	May 16, 2011
24	7	January 10, 2012	May 1, 2012
25	6	September 18, 2012	February 5, 2013
26	9	October 29, 2013	June 24, 2014
27	8	November 18, 2014	July 14, 2015
28	10	September 14, 2015	August 2, 2016
29	10	October 18, 2016	April 12, 2017
30	6	January 9, 2018	October 16, 2018
31	9	January 15, 2019	September 10, 2019
32	9	January 6, 2020	July 7, 2020
33	5	January 11, 2021	September 28, 2021
34	7	February 7, 2022	November 15, 2022
35	8	January 3, 2023	October 30, 2023
36	7	January 23, 2024	November 30, 2024
37	8	February 25, 2025	January 6, 2026

== Reception ==
=== Critical response ===
American Experience has received generally positive reviews from television critics and parents of young children. Glenn McNatt of The Baltimore Sun wrote that it is "TV's finest history series ever." Steve Johnson of Chicago Tribune wrote, "History comes alive in excellent docu-series."

== Home media ==
A DVD boxset collecting episodes about United States presidents was released on August 26, 2008. A DVD boxset for the five-part documentary We Shall Remain was released on May 12, 2009. The collection was updated to include the documentary on Bill Clinton's presidency on August 28, 2012, and the documentary on George W. Bush's presidency on May 4, 2020.
