= 2019 New York Film Festival =

57th edition

- Opening film: The Irishman
- Closing film: Motherless Brooklyn
- Location: New York City, United States
- Founded: 1963
- Founded by: Richard Roud and Amos Vogel
- Hosted by: Film at Lincoln Center
- Artistic director: Kent Jones
- Festival date: September 27 – October 13, 2019
- Website: https://www.filmlinc.org/nyff/

New York Film Festival
- 2020 2018

The 57th New York Film Festival took place from September 27 to October 13, 2019, in New York City, presented by Film at Lincoln Center.

Martin Scorsese's The Irishman was the opening film. Noah Baumbach's Marriage Story was the festival centerpiece. Edward Norton's Motherless Brooklyn was the closing film.

It marked the last edition led by Artistic director Kent Jones.

Appearing in the NYFF's "Main Slate" for the first time were: Mati Diop, Juliano Dornelles, Kantemir Balagov, Oliver Laxe, Koji Fukada, Angela Schanelec, Albert Serra, Pietro Marcello, Federico Veiroj, Edward Norton, Nadav Lapid, Corneliu Porumboiu and Diao Yinan.

World premieres included: Martin Scorsese's The Irishman, Roee Messinger's American Trial: The Eric Garner Story, Tania Cypriano's Born to Be, Ivy Meeropol's Bully. Coward. Victim. The Story of Roy Cohn, Lynn Novick's College Behind Bars, Manfred Kirchheimer's Free Time, Nick Broomfield's My Father and Me, and D.W. Young's The Booksellers.

== Official Selection ==
=== Main slate ===
The following film were selected for the Main Slate section:

| English Title | Original Title | Director(s) | Production Country |
|---|---|---|---|
| Atlantics | Atlantique | Mati Diop | Senegal, France, Belgium |
| Bacurau | | Kleber Mendonça Filho and Juliano Dornelles | Brazil, France |
| Beanpole | Дылда | Kantemir Balagov | Russia |
| Fire Will Come | O que arde | Oliver Laxe | Spain, France, Luxembourg |
| First Cow | | Kelly Reichardt | United States |
| A Girl Missing | よこがお | Koji Fukada | Japan, France |
| The Irishman (opening film) | | Martin Scorsese | United States |
| I Was at Home, But | Ich war zuhause, aber | Angela Schanelec | Germany, Serbia |
| Liberté | | Albert Serra | France, Germany, Portugal, Spain |
| Marriage Story (centerpiece) | | Noah Baumbach | United States, United Kingdom |
| Martin Eden | | Pietro Marcello | Italy, France |
| The Moneychanger | Así habló el cambista | Federico Veiroj | Uruguay |
| Motherless Brooklyn (closing film) | | Edward Norton | United States |
| Oh Mercy! | Roubaix, une lumière | Arnaud Desplechin | France |
| Pain and Glory | Dolor y gloria | Pedro Almodóvar | Spain |
| Parasite | 기생충 | Bong Joon Ho | South Korea |
| Portrait of a Lady on Fire | Portrait de la jeune fille en feu | Céline Sciamma | France |
| Saturday Fiction | 兰心大剧院 | Lou Ye | China |
| Sybil | | Justine Triet | France, Belgium |
| Synonyms | Synonymes | Nadav Lapid | France, Israel, Germany |
| To the Ends of the Earth | 旅のおわり世界のはじまり | Kiyoshi Kurosawa | Japan, Uzbekistan, Qatar |
| The Traitor | Il traditore | Marco Bellocchio | Italy, France, Brazil, Germany |
| Varda by Agnès | Varda par Agnès | Agnès Varda | France |
| Vitalina Varela | | Pedro Costa | Portugal |
| Wasp Network | | Olivier Assayas | France, Brazil, Spain, Belgium |
| The Whistlers | La Gomera | Corneliu Porumboiu | Romania, France, Germany |
| The Wild Goose Lake | 南方車站的聚會 | Diao Yinan | China, France |
| Young Ahmed | Le Jeune Ahmed | Jean-Pierre and Luc Dardenne | Belgium, France |
| Zombi Child | | Bertrand Bonello | France |

=== Special Events ===
The following film were selected to be screened:

| English Title | Original Title | Director(s) | Production Country |
|---|---|---|---|
| American Trial: The Eric Garner Story | | Roee Messinger | United States |
| The Cotton Club (directors cut) (1984) | | Francis Ford Coppola | United States |
| Joker | | Todd Phillips | United States |
| Uncut Gems | | Josh and Benny Safdie | United States |

=== Spotlight on Documentaries ===
The following film were selected to be screened:

| English Title | Original Title | Director(s) | Production Country |
|---|---|---|---|
| 45 Seconds of Laughter | | Tim Robbins | United States |
| 63 Up | | Michael Apted | United Kingdom |
| Bitter Bread | حقّ الخُبزات | Abbas Fahdel | France, Iraq, Lebanon, Saudi Arabia |
| The Booksellers | | D.W. Young | United States |
| Born to Be | | Tania Cypriano | United States |
| Bully. Coward. Victim. The Story of Roy Cohn | | Ivy Meeropol | United States |
| College Behind Bars (series) | | Lynn Novick | United States |
| Cunningham | | Alla Kovgan | France, Germany, United States |
| Free Time | | Manfred Kirchheimer | United States |
| My Father and Me | | Nick Broomfield | United Kingdom |
| Oliver Sacks: His Own Life | | Ric Burns | United States |
| Santiago, Italia | | Nanni Moretti | Chile, France, Italy |
| State Funeral | Государственные похороны | Sergei Loznitsa | Netherlands, Lithuania |
| Suite No. 1, Prelude (short) | | Nicholas Ma | United States |

=== Revivals ===
The following film were selected for the Revivals section:

| English Title | Original Title | Director(s) | Production Country |
|---|---|---|---|
| Arabesques on the Pirosmani Theme (short) (1985) | არაბესკები ფიროსმანის თემაზე | Sergei Parajanov | Soviet Union |
| The Color of Pomegranates (1969) | Նռան գույնը | Sergei Parajanov | Soviet Union |
| Dodsworth (1936) | | William Wyler | United States |
| The Forgotten (1950) | Los olvidados | Luis Buñuel | Mexico |
| Le Franc (1994) | | Djibril Diop Mambéty | Senegal |
| The Golden Age (1930) | L'Âge d'Or | Luis Buñuel | France |
| Hakob Hovnatanian (short) (1967) | Հակոբ Հովնաթանյան | Sergei Parajanov | Soviet Union |
| The House Is Black (1963) | خانه سیاه است | Forugh Farrokhzad | Iran |
| Incredible Shrinking Man (1957) | | Jack Arnold | United States |
| Indian Summer (1972) | La prima notte di quiete | Valerio Zurlini | Italy, France |
| Jazz on a Summer's Day (1959) | | Aram Avakian and Bert Stern | United States |
| Kiev Frescoes (short) (1965) | Київські фрески | Sergei Parajanov | Soviet Union |
| The Little Girl Who Sold the Sun (1999) | La Petite Vendeuse de Soleil | Djibril Diop Mambéty | Senegal |
| Sátántangó (1994) | | Béla Tarr | Hungary, Germany, Switzerland |
10 short films by Vittorio De Seta
| | Contadini del Mare | Vittorio De Seta | Italy |
| | I Dimenticati | Vittorio De Seta | Italy |
| | Isole Di Fuoco | Vittorio De Seta | Italy |
| | Lu Tempu di li Lisci Spata | Vittorio De Seta | Italy |
| | Parabola D’oro | Vittorio De Seta | Italy |
| | Pasqua in Sicilia | Vittorio De Seta | Italy |
| | Pastori di Orgosolo | Vittorio De Seta | Italy |
| | Pescherecci | Vittorio De Seta | Italy |
| | Surfarrara | Vittorio De Seta | Italy |
| | Un Giorno in Barbagia | Vittorio De Seta | Italy |
