= Zack Hample =

American baseball collector (born 1977)

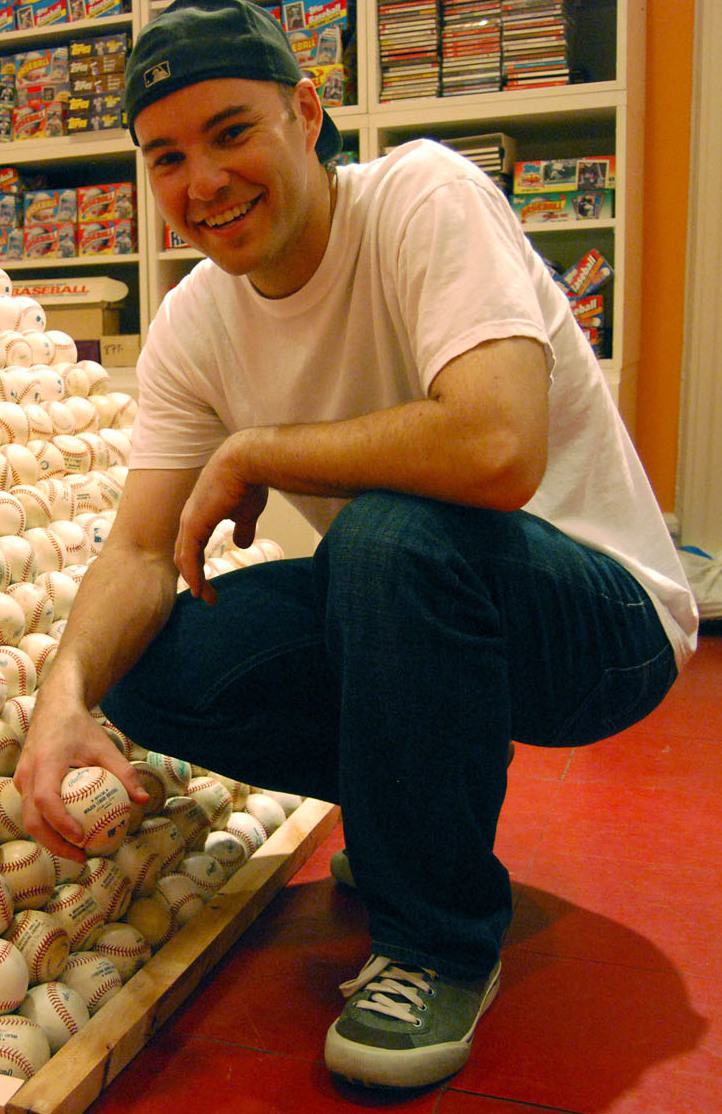
- Hample in 2008
- Born: Zachary Ben Hample; September 14, 1977 (age 49); New York City, U.S.
- Education: Guilford College
- Occupation: Collector
- Years active: 1990–present
- Known for: Collecting baseballs
- Parent: Stoo Hample (father)
- Website: zackhample.com

Zachary Ben Hample (born September 14, 1977) is an American baseball collector. Hample claims to have collected more than 13,000 baseballs from Major League stadiums, including Alex Rodriguez's 3,000th career hit and Mike Trout's first career home run.

Hample has been heavily criticized by sportswriters, players, and fans due to his aggressive tactics to collect baseballs.

== Early life ==
Hample was raised in New York City. He is the son of author, performer, playwright, and cartoonist Stoo Hample. He developed an interest in baseball at the age of five. He played Division III baseball for the Guilford Quakers while studying English at Guilford College. During his youth, Hample hoped to play in Major League Baseball before he began collecting baseballs.

== Baseball collection history ==
The first baseball that Hample caught at a game was at Shea Stadium in 1990. Hample has described his interest in catching foul balls as "a passion". He has said his obsession for catching balls developed "when I got my first ball, it’s like it multiplied from there. I wanted it so bad, not just one, I wanted another, and another and another."

Hample caught his 6,000th baseball in 2012. By 2022, he claimed to have caught 12,000 balls. He developed a device for catching balls at stadiums made out of a baseball glove, rubber band and pen. Hample claims to have developed friendships with current and former professional baseball players including Richard Bleier, Heath Bell, and Jeremy Guthrie.

Hample publishes videos about baseball and ballhawking on YouTube, where he had nearly 600,000 subscribers. He hires his own videographers to document some of his ballhawking exploits. Hample also operates a "concierge service", escorting fans to games and catching balls with them. He charges fans $1,500 for the experience, plus travel expenses.

=== Notable events ===
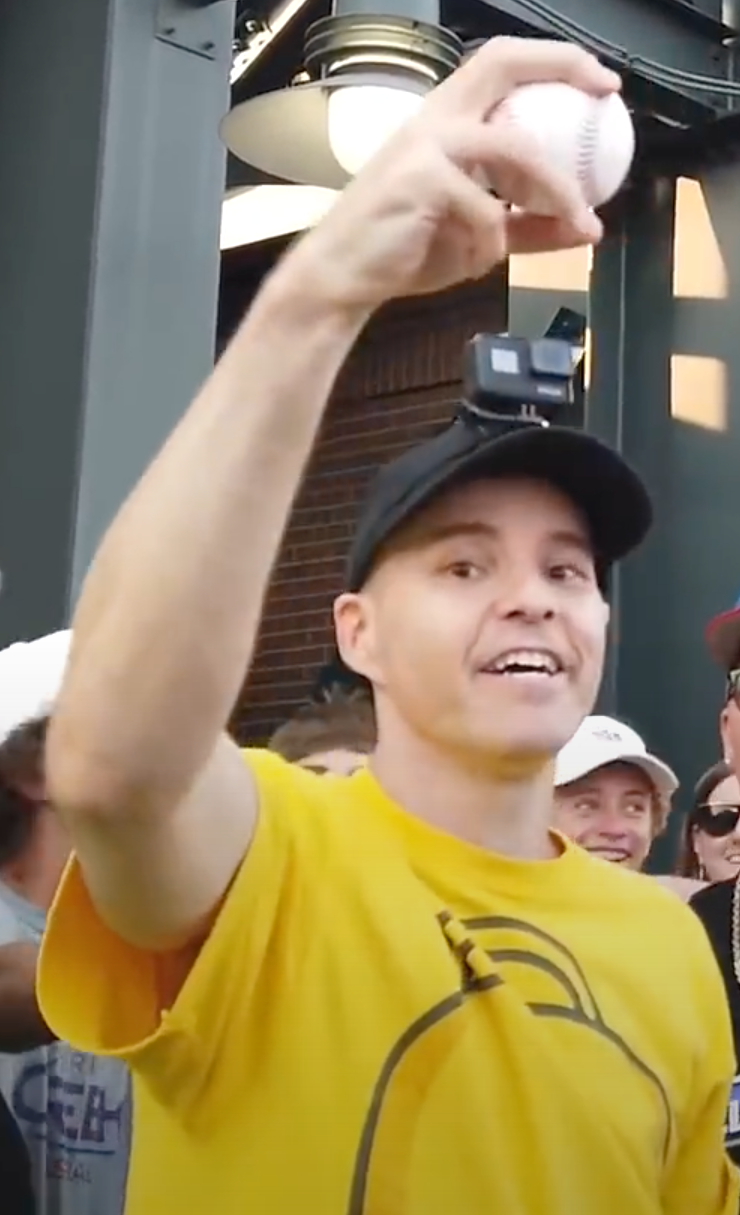
Hample holding up a ball he caught during the 2021 Home Run Derby

In 2008, Hample caught the last Mets home run hit at Shea Stadium. On April 18, 2013, Hample caught two home run balls during a game at Yankee Stadium, including the first career homer of shortstop Didi Gregorius. He also caught the first career home runs of Mike Trout and Mike Nickeas, and Barry Bonds' 724th home run.

In June 2015, Hample caught Alex Rodriguez's 3,000th career hit, which was a home run. Hample initially refused to return the ball on Twitter, saying Rodriguez "deserves nothing". However, he eventually agreed to give the ball to Rodriguez as part of an agreement with the Yankees where the organization donated $150,000 to Pitch In For Baseball. Hample also personally received an autographed jersey, two autographed bats, a VIP backstage tour of the stadium and tickets to the 2015 All-Star Game and Home Run Derby as part of his deal.

Topps made a Hample baseball card for its 2017 Topps Archives set.

In August 2022, Hample attempted to enter a prohibited section at Coors Field, which required a specific ticket for entry, to catch a Nolan Arenado home run ball. After Hample refused to comply, a group of security guards told him he would be ejected if he did not remain seated. Hample agreed, but complained about the "fan experience." According to one Twitter user, a Rockies usher also claimed Hample had grabbed a ball dropped by a young fan and refused to return it. Chicago Cubs pitcher Marcus Stroman criticized Hample for the incident, calling him "a loser." The Portland Pickles, a collegiate summer baseball team, announced that Hample was banned from attending games at Walker Stadium following the incident. Hample later removed a video about the incident from his channel and posted an apology.

== Writing ==
Hample has written several books about baseball, and previously wrote for MiLB.com. His first book, How to Snag Major League Baseballs (1999), is about ballhawking.

His second book Watching Baseball Smarter (2007) is an introduction to the mechanics and rules of baseball, and was mostly well received by critics. Craig Smith of The Seattle Times wrote that it "isn’t the first book to take on the challenge of explaining baseball intricacies, but I’ve never seen it done better". Publishers Weekly called it "an invaluable resource for armchair fans".

In 2011, Hample published his third book, The Baseball: Stunts, Scandals, and Secrets Beneath the Stitches, which chronicles the history of baseballs. Mike Shannon, editor-in-chief of Spitball magazine, described The Baseball as the "new authority on the subject". Kirkus Reviews gave a positive review, writing that it "provides plenty of revelations to even the most passionate follower of the game". Blogcritics described the book as entertaining and accessible to both baseball fans and readers unfamiliar with the sport.

== Controversies ==
=== Fort Bragg game ===
Hample acquired a ticket to the Fort Bragg Game on July 3, 2016 that was meant for active duty military personnel and their friends and families. Hample announced on Twitter that he was attending the game, and would donate $100 for every ball he collected to a charity for military veterans. He came under widespread criticism for taking the ticket and because he had publicly offered $1,000 to buy one. Hample claimed to have caught eleven balls at Fort Bragg and given ten away. He posted a lengthy apology on Twitter, which CBS Sports writer Mike Axisa wrote "boils down to 'I'm sorry but I really wanted to go.'"

=== Incidents with players and fans ===
Hample's aggressive tactics have resulted in widespread criticism from players and sportswriters. He has been accused of bumping multiple fans, including children, out of the way in attempts to catch balls. In 2017, Clayton Kershaw refused to give Hample a ball prior to a Dodgers game, claiming Hample had already caught over 7,000 prior. In 2022, a Colorado Rockies usher witnessed an incident in which a coach threw a ball to a young fan who then dropped it. Hample grabbed the ball; as he walked away, the usher asked why he didn't give the ball to the child, and Hample replied, "Because it's my ball. He dropped it, so it's my ball."

== Documentary ==
In 2022, a documentary titled Zack Hample vs the World was released. The documentary, which was produced, directed, written, and shot by Jeff Siegel, was filmed over a period of eight years. It was first screened at the Baseball Hall Of Fame Film Festival in 2019, with Hample and Siegel in attendance. Hample was quoted as saying "I always dreamt that I’d end up in the Hall of Fame and in a way I kinda am."

The documentary was reviewed by three critics. Jeff Ames of Comingsoon.net gave the film a score of eight out of ten, saying that it "entertains thanks to its engaging subject matter". Stephen Silver, writing for Tilt, said that "I now find the subject more interesting than I did before I watched the film, but I don't necessarily find myself any more sympathetic to him."

== Other activities ==
=== Helicopter stunts ===
On July 2, 2012, Hample attempted to catch a baseball dropped from a helicopter 1,000 feet above LeLacheur Park in Lowell, Massachusetts. Wearing catcher's gear that was donated by Rawlings, Hample caught a softball dropped from a height of 312 feet. He then caught baseballs dropped from heights of 562 feet and 822 feet before the Federal Aviation Administration called off the stunt due to strong winds. The 822-foot catch was initially thought to be 762 feet, but a discrepancy in the altimeter settings, which was captured on video and discovered months later, added 60 feet to the altitude. On July 13, 2013, Hample made another attempt at LeLacheur Park and succeeded in catching a baseball dropped from an altitude of 1,050 feet.

The catch is not recognized as a record by Guinness World Records, as no one from the organization was in attendance to verify the attempt.

=== Video games ===
Hample, a competitive video game player, appeared briefly in the 2007 documentary The King of Kong: A Fistful of Quarters. According to Twin Galaxies, he holds official world records on half a dozen classic video games including Breakout (896 points) and Arkanoid (1,658,110 points).

=== Fundraising ===
Hample began working with Pitch in for Baseball and Softball, a non-profit charity that provides baseball and softball equipment to underprivileged children, in 2009. He had raised over $200,000 for the organization as of 2019. He raises the money with help from his fans, who pledge money for every baseball that he snags at major league stadiums, and from BIGS Sunflower Seeds, who sponsored him during the 2013 season.

== Personal life ==
Hample lives on the Upper West Side of Manhattan. He is Jewish.

Hample's family owns and operates Argosy Book Store, and was the focus of the 2019 documentary The Booksellers.

== Filmography ==
Year	Title	Notes
2022	Zack Hample vs. The World	
2019	The Booksellers	
2007	The King of Kong	
