= Greenwich Entertainment =

Independent film distribution company in the US

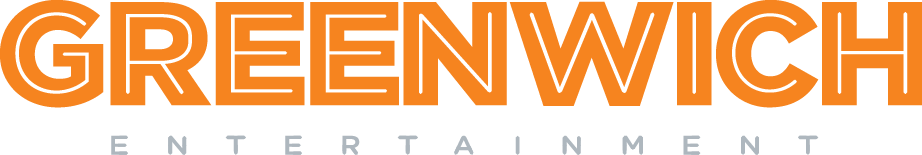
- Type: Private
- Industry: Entertainment
- Founded: 2017
- Headquarters: Los Angeles, California, United States
- Number of locations: 2
- Key people: Ed Arentz (Co-President); Andy Bohn (Co-President); Edmondo Schwartz (Co-Founder); Jasper Basch (Head of Distribution)
- Services: Film Distribution
- Number of employees: 11-50
- Website: greenwichentertainment.com

Greenwich Entertainment, founded in 2017, is an independent film distribution company specializing in narrative and documentary feature films. The company released Jimmy Chin and Chai Vasarhelyi’s Academy Award-Winning Documentary Free Solo, which grossed over $17M at the US box office, Andrew Slater’s Echo in the Canyon, which opened to the highest per-theater-average of any documentary in 2019, and Linda Ronstadt: The Sound of My Voice by Rob Epstein and Jeffrey Friedman. In May 2025, Jasper Basch, formerly of Variance Films, was named partner and Head of Distribution.

== Filmography ==
Film	Release date
Itzhak	March 9, 2018
Mountain	May 11, 2018
Westwood	June 8, 2018
Scotty and the Secret History of Hollywood	July 27, 2018
The Bookshop	August 24, 2018
Garry Winogrand: All Things Are Photographable	September 19, 2018
Free Solo	September 28, 2018
The World Before Your Feet	November 21, 2018
The Invisibles	January 25, 2019
Piercing	February 1, 2019
Ferrante Fever	March 8, 2019
Screwball	March 29, 2019
The Public	April 5, 2019
Wild Nights with Emily	April 12, 2019
Echo in the Canyon	May 24, 2019
Leaving Home, Coming Home: A Portrait of Robert Frank	May 31, 2019
Three Peaks	June 28, 2019
Linda Ronstadt: The Sound of My Voice	September 6, 2019
Citizen K	January 15, 2020
Incitement	January 31, 2020
The Times of Bill Cunningham	February 14, 2020
The Booksellers	March 6, 2020
Human Nature	March 13, 2020
Diana Kennedy: Nothing Fancy	April 22, 2020
Deerskin	May 1, 2020
Gordon Lightfoot: If You Could Read My Mind	July 29, 2020
CREEM: America's Only Rock 'n' Roll Magazine	August 7, 2020
Desert One	August 21, 2020
Jimmy Carter: Rock & Roll President	September 9, 2020
Harry Chapin: When in Doubt, Do Something	October 16, 2020
The Donut King	October 30, 2020
Billie	December 4, 2020
Assassins	December 11, 2020
Preparations to Be Together for an Unknown Period of Time	January 22, 2021
Days of the Bagnold Summer	February 19, 2021
Us Kids	May 14, 2021
When Hitler Stole Pink Rabbit	May 21, 2021
Moby Doc	May 28, 2021
Super Frenchie	June 4, 2021
Sublet	June 11, 2021
Kenny Scharf: When Worlds Collide	June 25, 2021
The Phantom	July 2, 2021
All The Streets Are Silent	July 23, 2021
Whirlybird	August 6, 2021
Not Going Quietly	August 13, 2021
Barbara Lee: Speaking Truth to Power	August 20, 2021
The Big Scary "S" Word	September 3, 2021
The Capote Tapes	September 10, 2021
Savior for Sale: Da Vinci's Lost Masterpiece?	September 17, 2021
Man in the Field: The Life and Art of Jim Denevan	September 24, 2021
Karen Dalton: In My Own Time	October 1, 2021
Enormous: The Gorge Story	October 1, 2021
The Rescue	October 8, 2021
Keyboard Fantasies	October 29, 2021
Attica	October 29, 2021
NEEDTOBREATHE: Into the Mystery	November 3, 2021
Dear Rider	November 5, 2021
Love It Was Not	November 5, 2021
Cusp	November 12, 2021
The Real Charlie Chaplin	November 19, 2021
Try Harder!	December 3, 2021
President	December 17, 2021
A Cops And Robbers Story	January 14, 2022
Charli XCX: Alone Together	January 28, 2022
Ronnie's	February 11, 2022
Let Me Be Me	February 25, 2022
Dear Mr. Brody	March 4, 2022
¡Viva Maestro!	April 8, 2022
The Revolution Generation	April 22, 2022
Hello, Bookstore	April 29, 2022
The Sanctity of Space	May 6, 2022
Mau	May 13, 2022
A Taste of Whale	May 27, 2022
Stay Prayed Up	June 17, 2022
Accepted	July 1, 2022
From Where They Stood	July 15, 2022
My Donkey, My Lover & I	July 22, 2022
Ali & Ava	July 29, 2022
The Youth Governor	August 26, 2022
We Are As Gods	September 2, 2022
Hockeyland	September 9, 2022
Nothing Compares	September 23, 2022
Buried: The 1982 Alpine Meadows Avalanche	September 23, 2022
Darryl Jones: In the Blood	October 7, 2022
Let There Be Drums!	October 28, 2022
Love, Charlie: The Rise and Fall of Chef Charlie Trotter	November 18, 2022
Lowndes County and the Road to Black Power	December 2, 2022
Loudmouth	December 9, 2022
Reading Lolita in Tehran	2023
The Man in the Basement	January 27, 2023
iMordecai	February 10, 2023
Calendar Girls	February 21, 2023
Juniper	February 24, 2023
I Got a Monster	March 10, 2023
Nam June Paik: Moon is the Oldest TV	March 24, 2023
River	April 21, 2023
The Melt Goes On Forever: The Art & Times of David Hammons	May 5, 2023
Concerned Citizen	June 2, 2023
Here. Is. Better.	June 23, 2023
In the Company of Rose	June 30, 2023
Two Tickets to Greece	July 14, 2023
The Beasts	July 28, 2023
Madeleine Collins	August 18, 2023
The Elephant 6 Recording Co.	August 25, 2023
Joyce Carol Oates: A Body in the Service of Mind	September 8, 2023
Neither Confirm Nor Deny	September 22, 2023
Your Friend, Memphis	October 6, 2023
Robert Irwin: A Desert of Pure Feeling	October 20, 2023
Subject	November 3, 2023
Who I Am Not	November 10, 2023
Smoke Sauna Sisterhood	November 24, 2023
Pianoforte	December 1, 2023
Weak Layers	January 5, 2024
Inshallah a Boy	January 12, 2024
Space: The Longest Goodbye	March 8, 2024
The Fox	March 22, 2024
Karaoke	March 29, 2024
Lost Angel: The Genius of Judee Sill	April 12, 2024
Uncropped	April 26, 2024
Queendom	June 14, 2024
Copa 71	June 21, 2024
Revival69: The Concert That Rocked the World	June 28, 2024
Sorry/Not Sorry	July 12, 2024
Swan Song	July 26, 2024
Coup!	August 2, 2024
Close to You	August 16, 2024
The Cowboy and the Queen	September 2, 2024
The Critic	September 13, 2024
Happy Clothes: A Film About Patricia Field	September 20, 2024
Food and Country	October 2, 2024
Separated	October 4, 2024
Mad About the Boy: The Noel Coward Story	October 9, 2024
Carville: Winning is Everything, Stupid	October 11, 2024
Starring Jerry as Himself	November 6, 2024
Never Look Away	November 22, 2024
Diane Warren: Relentless	January 10, 2024
UnBroken	February 21, 2025
Ex-Husbands	February 21, 2025
The Klezmer Project	February 25, 2025
There's Still Tomorrow	March 7, 2025
AUM: The Cult at the End of the World	March 19, 2025
Janis Ian: Breaking Silence	March 28, 2025
Mogwai: If the Stars Had a Sound	April 11, 2025
Bonjour Tristesse	May 2, 2025
Marcella	May 9, 2025
Simple Minds: Everything Is Possible	June 13, 2025
blur: To the End	June 27, 2025
blur: Live at Wembley Stadium	July 4, 2025
Shoshana	July 25, 2025
Delegation	August 1, 2025
Angelheaded Hipster: The Songs of Marc Bolan & T.Rex	August 8, 2025
Went Up the Hill	August 15, 2025
Love, Brooklyn	August 29, 2025
The Jewish Nazi?	September 12, 2025
Soul of a Nation	October 3, 2025
Come Closer	December 5, 2025
Islands	January 30, 2026
Dreams	February 27, 2026
Fantasy Life	March 27, 2026
Omaha	April 24, 2026
Magic Hour	May 15, 2026
Jinsei	June 5, 2026
Peter Asher: Everywhere Man	June 19, 2026
Reading Lolita in Tehran	July 10, 2026
Olmo	August 7, 2026
The Marching Band	August 21, 2026
You Had to Be There	September 18, 2026
The Scout	September 25, 2026
Queen at Sea	October 30, 2026
The Friend's House Is Here	December 4, 2026
Run Amok	2027
Light Pillar	2027
A Girl Unknown	2027
Nagi Notes	2027
Brian	2027
Growth of The Soil	2027
