= Bard Prison Initiative =

US organization offering degree programs to prisoners

The Bard Prison Initiative (BPI) is a program of Bard College that provides college education to people in prison. BPI currently enrolls 400 students full-time across seven prisons in New York State. It engage students in the full breadth of liberal arts culminating in associate and bachelor's degrees from Bard.

The Bard Prison Initiative was founded by undergraduates at Bard College in 1999, after access to Pell Grants was eliminated for incarcerated people in the 1994 Violent Crime Control and Law Enforcement Act, shutting down most prison education programs around the country. BPI launched as a pilot with 16 students in 2001. Its first associate degrees were issued in 2005 and the first bachelor’s degrees in 2008. Since 2001, BPI has issued more than 50,000 credits and over 760 degrees; it offers more than 160 courses per academic year.

BPI is one of fewer than 14% of college in prison programs that offers reentry services in and outside of prison for its students and alumni.

BPI is the subject of College Behind Bars, a 2019 documentary executive produced by Ken Burns and directed by Lynn Novick. That same year, College Behind Bars was screened at the New York Film Festival. In 2020, College Behind Bars was nominated for an Emmy under the “Outstanding Social Issue Documentary” category. It also won a gold Telly Award in 2020 for “Documentary: Series: Television.” As of 2023, the docuseries has been screened at more than fifty higher education institutions and many jails and prisons in the United States.

In 2015, BPI made international news when its debate union won in a match against the debate team from Harvard University. In 2018, Deadline announced that a movie was being developed by Warner Brothers about BPI’s 2015 debate with Harvard. The BPI Debate Union was founded in 2013 and has debated universities and colleges such as Brown University, the University of Pennsylvania, Morehouse College, and the University of Cambridge. As of 2023, BPI’s Debate Union had won twelve debates and lost four.

BPI is also the home of the Consortium for the Liberal Arts in Prison, which recruits, assists, and collaborates with colleges and universities across the country as they reestablish college opportunity for people in prison in their home states. In 2019 BPI launched the BPI Summer Residency which trains educators and practitioners to expand college in prison nationally.

== Higher Education Beyond Prison ==
Since 2016 BPI has established full scholarship “Microcolleges” outside of prison where non-residential students earn Bard associate degrees in small campus spaces built inside partner community institutions. The three Bard Microcolleges are: Bard Microcollege Holyoke in Massachusetts, established in 2016 at The Care Center; Bard at Brooklyn Public Library, established in 2018 at Central Library in Brooklyn New York; and The Bard Microcollege for Just Community Leadership established in Harlem in 2021 in partnership with JustLeadershipUSA and College & Community Fellowship.

In 2020, BPI also created the Bard Baccalaureate – a full scholarship non-residential bachelor’s degree program for adult students over the age of 25 on Bard’s campus in Annandale-on-Hudson, NY.
