= Love, Charlie: The Rise and Fall of Chef Charlie Trotter =

2021 film directed by Rebecca Halpern

- Theatrical poster
- Directed by: Rebecca Halpern
- Written by: Rebecca Halpern
- Produced by: Renée Frigo
- Cinematography: Rod Hassler
- Edited by: Gabriel Britz; Daniel Algarin
- Music by: Brian Reitzell
- Production company: Oak Street Pictures
- Distributed by: Greenwich Entertainment
- Release date: October 18, 2021 (Chicago International Film Festival)
- Running time: 96 minutes
- Country: United States
- Language: English

Love, Charlie: The Rise and Fall of Chef Charlie Trotter is a 2021 American documentary film written and directed by Rebecca Halpern. The documentary is about the life of chef Charlie Trotter. Love, Charlie had its world premiere at the 57th Annual Chicago International Film Festival, where it won the Best of the Fest Award.

== Synopsis ==
Created and culled from personal and family archival video and film footage, letters written to friends, family members, and loved ones, and a wide range of interviews, including ones with fellow chefs, Love, Charlie explores the ascent, descent, and legacy of the late Charlie Trotter.

== Release ==
Love, Charlie had its premiere at the Chicago International Film Festival in 2021.

The documentary also screened at Florida Film Festival and Seattle International Film Festival.

== Reception ==
Love, Charlie opened to positive reviews from critics. Chicago Sun-Times film critic Richard Roeper called it “One of the best documentaries of the year.” Michael Phillips of Chicago Tribune called it "the first fully successful documentary about a high-flying Chicago chef’s triumph and torment.”
