= Barbara Kopple =

American film director (born 1946)

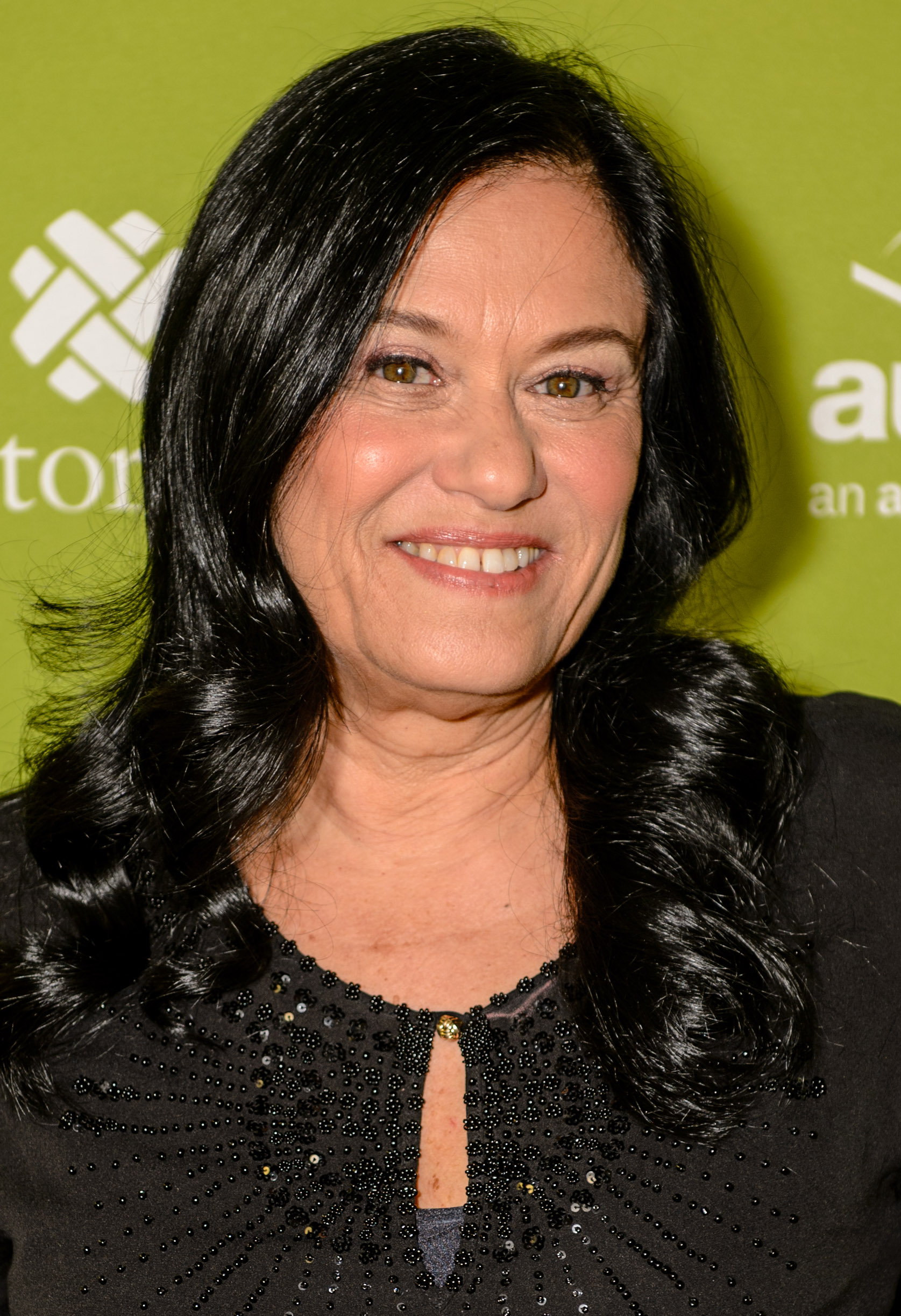
- Kopple at the May 2015 Montclair Film Festival
- Born: July 30, 1946 (age 80); New York City, U.S.
- Occupation: Film director

Barbara Kopple (born July 30, 1946) is an American film director known primarily for her documentary work. She is credited with pioneering a renaissance of cinema vérité, and bringing the historic French style to a modern American audience. Known for her "fly-on-the-wall" filmmaking style, Kopple captured raw, real-life events without interrupting the action. She has won two Academy Awards, for Harlan County, USA (1976), about a Kentucky miners' strike, and for American Dream (1990), the story of the 1985–86 Hormel strike in Austin, Minnesota, making her the first woman to win two Oscars in the Best Documentary category.

Kopple gained acclaim for the film Bearing Witness (2005), a documentary about five women journalists stationed in combat zones during the Iraq War. She is also known for directing the documentary films Wild Man Blues (1997), A Conversation With Gregory Peck (1999), My Generation (2000), Running from Crazy (2013), Miss Sharon Jones! (2015), and Desert One (2019).

She received a Primetime Emmy Award for Fallen Champ: The Untold Story of Mike Tyson (1993), and directed episodes of television drama series such as the NBC police drama series Homicide: Life on the Street (1999) and the HBO prison drama series Oz (1999), winning a Directors Guild of America award for the former.

Kopple received a Lifetime Achievement Award from the National Academy of Television Arts and Sciences on September 28, 2023.

== Early life and education ==
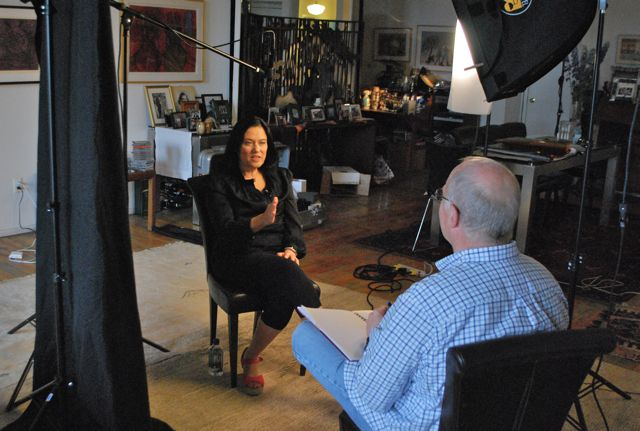
Barbara Kopple interviewed by Paul Mariano for These Amazing Shadows

Kopple was born in New York City, and grew up on a vegetable farm in Scarsdale, New York, the daughter of a textile executive.

Her uncle, Murray Burnett, was a co-author of Everybody Comes to Rick's, an unproduced play that was the basis for the film Casablanca. Her mother and maternal grandparents grew up in Peekskill, New York, the latter of whom publicly criticized the attempted censorship of singer Paul Robeson in 1949.

At Northeastern University, she studied political science and clinical psychology, and for a clinical psychology course, she made her first film, "Winter Soldiers," about Vietnam veterans, instead of writing a term paper. While working among lobotomy patients at Medfield State Hospital with Northeastern University, she decided she wanted to be a filmmaker instead.

"I realized when I was studying psychology that nobody would probably ever read what I wrote"
— Barbara Kopple

Kopple's political involvement started in college with her participation in antiwar protests against the Vietnam War.

== Career ==
Kopple attended the School of Visual Arts, where she met documentary filmmakers Albert and David Maysles through a classmate.

"I really wanted to learn about documentaries, so I went to SVA (School of Visual Arts). I took this class in cinéma vérité. There was a woman in the class who said: "I work for these people, the Maysles brothers. They're just finishing a film and they could use some help. Would you like to come?" So I said, "Yes, are you kidding?" And I never went back into that class again. "
— Barbara Kopple

She assisted them on their documentary Salesman, and then did camera work for their film on the Rolling Stones, titled Gimme Shelter. Reflecting on her time working with the Maysles, Kopple said "the wonderful thing about working for Alan and David Maysles was that they were the first company that treated women as equals...everybody attended all the meetings; everybody's opinion was important."

She subsequently worked as an editor, camera operator, and sound operator on numerous documentaries and then started production on Harlan County, USA in 1972. She also created a production company in 1972, Cabin Creek Films, through which she would continue to direct and produce features and television projects, in addition to documentaries. Notable intern alums from her production company, Cabin Creek Films, include Jesse Moss, Kristi Jacobson, and Jan Ackerman.

=== Harlan County, USA ===
Kopple first became aware of the plights of the Appalachia miners while studying at Northeastern University. In 1972, Kopple started her own production company, Cabin Creek Films. It was during this time that miners walked off the job in Harlan County, and Kopple began the filming Miners for Democracy movement led by Arnold Miller. When Tony Boyle was ousted from the union leadership and miners began striking for union recognition, Kopple moved to Harlan with a crew of five and a loan of $12,000. Kopple and her crew lived with the miners, filming (or, pretending to film) even when they ran out of film because the presence of a camera "kept down violence."

"In 1973, I went with Barbara Kopple to Harlan County, Kentucky as associate director and assistant camerawoman of Harlan County, U.S.A. That experience radically changed my approach to filmmaking. I had been working on the film syncing dailies and reviewing material. Then a call came from the United Mineworkers that they needed someone to film in Harlan County or there would be a killing. Barbara, Kevin Keating, Richard Warner (our local liaison who had owned a sock store in Knoxville, Tennessee), and I flew to Knoxville, loaded into a station wagon with all the 16 mm gear, and drove across 2 lane roads to the picket line. We arrived at 5 am. On one side of the road there were about 30 state troopers looking mean. On the other side, there were an equal number of tough-looking women with clubs. Within an hour, we were filming violent arrests and women being dragged...."
— Anne Lewis

"The scene I love the best of me being in Harlan County was when [mine foreman] Basil Collins stopped his truck and said, "Come over here, honey." After I did, he said, "Who do you work for?" And I said, "United Press." He said, "Let me see your press card." And I yelled for Anne Lewis to go in my purse and get my press card. I actually did have one. He had guns in the car, and I asked him questions like, "Who are you and how do you feel about these people picketing up here?" I said, "And what's your position?" And he said, "Mine foreman." And I said, "Do you have any identification?" He said, "Well, I may have lost mine." And so he said, "Well, where is your press card?" I said, "Well, I may have misplaced mine." Then he zoomed off. The people who were on the picket line said: "Easy. He's the chief gun thug. He's the one who could take your life at any point." But I wasn't afraid...."
— Barbara Kopple

Harlan County, USA took four years to make and cost over $200,000. Continuing production was financially demanding on Kopple and her small crew, who regularly moved back-and-forth between Harlan and New York to collect financial backing from grant proposals and odd jobs, even writing letters for money from miners' homes. When she ran out of money, Kopple would "come back to New York and take whatever job I could, editing, sound, until I got enough to go back." Producers in New York were dismissive, with one asking "Why is a little girl like you doing a film like this?" Kopple also accepted donated money from her parents, friends and others in order to continue financing the project; she eventually placed herself into great debt for the film, utilizing her personal credit card for many expenses.

Kopple was threatened by mine owners during filming, being told that "if I was ever caught alone at night I'd be killed." She reportedly carried two pistols while filming in Harlan.

Harlan County, USA debuted at the New York Film Festival in October 1976, where it received a standing ovation. The film won the Academy Award for Best Documentary Feature, Kopple accepting the award "on behalf of the miners of Harlan County who took us into their homes, trusted us, and shared their love with us."

After Harlan County, USA, Kopple didn't finish another documentary until 1990. Kopple instead took her political focus on unions to television, directing the 90-minute television drama Keeping On.

=== American Dream ===
American Dream, Kopple's next feature-length documentary captured the 1985–86 Hormel strike, a two-year-long workers strike against Hormel Foods, following the company's move to cut wages and reduce benefits despite generating $29 million in profit. Kopple was first turned onto the subject matter in the early 1980s while working on starting a different documentary project. While driving in Worthington, Minn., Kopple heard a new radio broadcast on developing strikes amongst workers in meatpacking plants of Austin. Kopple reportedly started driving towards Austin immediately; "that was the beginning," said Kopple, "And I never left."

American Dream proved to be even more difficult for Kopple to produce than Harlan County, USA, despite her previous documentary's success. Budget for the film was tight, and Kopple found it difficult to obtain funding due to its subject matter. It took five years for Kopple to obtain financing for the film, and mentions her personal belief that her previous Oscar win hindered funding support.

Unlike Harlan County, which had Kopple very much on one side of the battle, Kopple intentionally aimed to be much more objective in depicting the differing perspectives of the Hormel Strike in American Dream. "I cared about the people in Austin, Minn., very much," Kopple reflected, "but if we were ever to look back at [the film], we had to have the full story."

== Style and themes ==
She has noted her major influence to be director Lucy Jarvis, for her both her approach to life and prolificness. Kopple's documentaries are in the style of cinema vérité. Reflecting on her documentaries in 1991, Kopple said "the kind of films that influenced me have more to do with watching people, letting scenes come alive so you actually see people change through the course of the film...almost like you're right there." Her work typically consists of observational footage, minimal voice-overs and intimate interviews with her subjects, aided by the small-scale nature of her productions. She is quoted saying "I really love people, and I love telling their stories and I feel so excited when I get to do so" and "I try so hard to let the characters be the ones that carry the story and say the things they want to say." Thus she is humanist in her approach to storytelling. She has listed the Maysle brothers and D. A. Pennebaker as notable influences on her technique. "I absolutely loved Don't Look Back because he got so close to Dylan," Kopple said of Pennebacker. "I wanted to make films that were as intimate as that."

Kopple's work is often politically driven. She has made several films on U.S. labor issues, as well as worker's unions, and has been a longtime advocate for the American labor movement. Many of her documentaries revolve around political subject matters, but her more recent work has taken a shift towards music documentary and celebrity portraiture.

For her documentaries, Kopple works in small crews of two to five, almost always acting as her own sound operator.

Kopple embraces a collaborative approach to filmmaking, particularly in the editing process. The collaborative models of working originates from her internship with the Maysles Brothers in Gimme Shelter (1970) and later joining the film collective that would produce Winter Soldier (1972). While editing Harlan County, USA, Kopple sought multiple editors for the nine-month post-production process. She used the same process when editing Shut Up & Sing, stating, "We were working with so many different editors and different sensibilities but the discussions we had were sensational, because you couldn't say no. You had to explain how it moved the story forward or what it gave the characters so it was very egalitarian in the editing room."

== Ethics ==
Past financial struggles influenced Kopple's embrace of commercial projects, her recent partnership was with YouTube's production of This Is Everything: Gigi Gorgeous. She has partnered with studios such as ABC, NBC, Lifetime Television, Disney Channel and The Weinstein Company. Kopple responds to criticism surrounding lack of authenticity in commissioned films citing the conventions of cinéma vérité and direct cinema that she followed in her first films. She relies on a neutral outlook when approaching the subject matter of her films, some of whom were controversial figures such as Woody Allen and Mike Tyson.

== Personal life ==
Kopple describes herself as a "filmmaker and mom." She is a niece of the American playwright Murray Burnett.

== Filmography ==
- 1972: Winter Soldier
- 1976: Harlan County, USA
- 1981: Keeping On
- 1990: American Dream
- 1992: Beyond JFK: The Question of Conspiracy
- 1993: Fallen Champ: The Untold Story of Mike Tyson
- 1994: Century of Women: Sexuality and Social Justice
- 1994: Century of Women: Work and Family
- 1997: Homicide: Life on the Street - The Documentary
- 1997: Wild Man Blues
- 1998: Homicide: Life on the Street - Pit Bull Sessions
- 1999: A Conversation with Gregory Peck
- 1999: Homicide: Life on the Street - Self Defense
- 2000: My Generation
- 2002: American Standoff
- 2002: The Hamptons
- 2004: Bearing Witness
- 2004: Dance Cuba: Dreams of Flight
- 2004: WMD: Weapons of Mass Deception
- 2005: Havoc
- 2006: Shut Up & Sing
- 2010: 30 for 30: The House of Steinbrenner
- 2011: Gunfight
- 2013: Running from Crazy
- 2015: Miss Sharon Jones!
- 2016: Gigi Gorgeous: This is Everything
- 2017: A Murder in Mansfield
- 2018: New Homeland
- 2019: Desert One
- 2022: Gumbo Coalition
- 2026: Union Town

== Awards and honors ==
Year	Association	Category	Nominated work	Result	Ref.
1977	Academy Award	Best Documentary Film	Harlan County, USA	Won	
1991	Academy Award	Best Documentary Film	American Dream	Won	
1993	Primetime Emmy Awards	Outstanding Individual Achievement – Informational Programming	Fallen Champ: The Untold Story of Mike Tyson	Won	
1995	Primetime Emmy Awards	Outstanding Informational Series	A Century of Woman	Nominated	
2014	Primetime Emmy Awards	Outstanding Documentary or Nonfiction	Running from Crazy	Nominated	
2010	News & Documentary Emmy Awards	Outstanding Arts & Culture Documentary	Woodstock: Now & Then	Nominated	
2017	News & Documentary Emmy Awards	Outstanding Arts & Culture Documentary	Miss Sharon Jones!	Nominated	
2019	News & Documentary Emmy Awards	Outstanding Research	Re:Mastered: Tricky Dick and the Man in Black	Nominated	
1992	Directors Guild of America Award	Outstanding Directorial Achievement in Documentaries	American Dream	Won	
1994	Directors Guild of America Award	Outstanding Directorial Achievement in Documentaries	Fallen Champ: The Untold Story of Mike Tyson	Won	
1998	Directors Guild of America Award	Outstanding Directorial Achievement in Dramatic Series	Homicide: Life on the Street	Won	
1991	Sundance Film Festival	Grand Jury Prize	American Dream	Won	
1991	Sundance Film Festival	Filmmakers Trophy	American Dream	Won	
1991	Sundance Film Festival	Audience Award	American Dream	Won	
1998	Sundance Film Festival	Grand Jury Prize	Wild Man Blues	Nominated	

Miscellaneous awards

- 1994: American Film Institute, USA, Maya Deren Independent Film and Video Artists Award
- 1998: Human Rights Watch International Film Festival, Lifetime Achievement Award
- 2006: Woman Film Critics Circle Awards, Lifetime Achievement Award
- 2006: Special Jury Prize for DocuFest Competition, Shut Up & Sing
- 2011: Felix Award for Best Documentary, American Dream
- 2011: Grand Festival Award for Documentary, Bagels, Borscht, and Brotherhood – Allen Ginsberg
- 2018: Athena Film Festival, Laura Ziskin Lifetime Achievement Award

== See also ==
- List of female film and television directors
- American film directors
- Women's cinema
- Academy Award Winners
- Cinéma vérité
