= Starring Jerry as Himself =

2023 documentary film

- Directed by: Law Chen
- Written by: Jerry Hsu
- Produced by: Jonathan Hsu
- Starring: Jerry Hsu
- Cinematography: Tinx Chan
- Edited by: Law Chen
- Music by: Eric Hölljes
- Production companies: Forces Unseen; Hsubox Productions Inc.
- Distributed by: Greenwich Entertainment
- Release date: January 21, 2023 (Slamdance)
- Running time: 75 minutes
- Country: United States
- Languages: English; Mandarin

Starring Jerry as Himself is a documentary directed by Law Chen and produced by Jonathan Hsu.

The hybrid documentary is about Jerry, an immigrant who had recently retired in Florida, being recruited by the Chinese police to be an undercover agent.

Greenwich Entertainment has acquired rights to the narrative-doc hybrid Starring Jerry As Himself, which won the Grand Jury Award for Best Documentary, Audience Award for Best Documentary, and a Best Actor Award for Jerry Hsu's performance at the Slamdance Film Festival in 2023, from Visit Films, slating it for release in select theaters and on home entertainment platforms in the fall 2024.

== Reception ==
On review aggregator website Rotten Tomatoes, the film holds an approval rating of 100% based on 17 reviews, with an average rating of 7.7/10.
