= Charlie Trotter =

American chef and resaurateur (1959–2013)

- Born: September 8, 1959; Wilmette, Illinois, US
- Died: November 5, 2013 (aged 54); Chicago, Illinois, US
- Education: New Trier High School; University of Wisconsin; California Culinary Academy
- Spouses: Lisa Ehrlich (m. 1986; div. 1990): Lynn Thomas (div. 2001); Rochelle Smith (m. 2010)
- Culinary career
- Cooking style: Degustation
- Ratings: Michelin stars (Restaurant Charlie); Michelin stars (Charlie Trotter's)
- Previous restaurants: Charlie Trotter's — Chicago, Illinois; Restaurant Charlie — Las Vegas, Nevada
- Television show: 1999 – PBS — The Kitchen Sessions with Charlie Trotter
- Award(s) won: James Beard Foundation – Outstanding Chef 1999

Charlie Trotter (September 8, 1959 – November 5, 2013) was an American chef and restaurateur. His best-known restaurant, Charlie Trotter's, was open in Chicago from 1987 to 2012.

== Early life and education ==
Trotter was born in Wilmette, Illinois and graduated from New Trier High School in Winnetka, Illinois. He attended Southern Illinois University in Carbondale, Illinois from 1977 to 1979, and then transferred to University of Wisconsin–Madison. Trotter started cooking professionally in 1982 after earning a political science bachelor's degree from UW–Madison.

== Career ==
For five years after college, he worked and studied in Chicago, San Francisco (at the California Culinary Academy), Florida and Europe. He opened his first restaurant in Chicago with his father, Bob Trotter, as his partner.

Trotter was the host of the 1999 PBS cooking show The Kitchen Sessions with Charlie Trotter, in which he details his recipes and cooking techniques. He likened cooking to an improvisational jazz session in that as two riffs will never be the same, so too with food. He also wrote 14 cookbooks and three management books, and promoted a line of organic and all-natural gourmet foods distributed nationally.

Trotter was involved with his philanthropic Charlie Trotter Culinary Education Foundation and other causes. He was awarded the Humanitarian of the Year award in 2005 by the International Association of Culinary Professionals. He invited groups of public high school students into his restaurant as part of his Excellence Program two to three times per week: after eating a meal, the students were told how the food was prepared and the motivations of those preparing it.

Trotter also was unusual among celebrity chefs for his outspokenness in matters of ethics, most famously when he took foie gras off the menu in 2002 for ethical reasons. However, Trotter refused to be associated with the animal rights group Farm Sanctuary stating, "These people are idiots. Understand my position: I have nothing to do with a group like that. I think they're pathetic. … [S]ome of their tactics are crude and uncivilized even."

Trotter made a cameo appearance in the 1997 film My Best Friend's Wedding, screaming at an assistant, "I will kill your whole family if you don't get this right! I need this perfect!" a parody of a stereotypical screaming angry chef.

== Restaurants ==
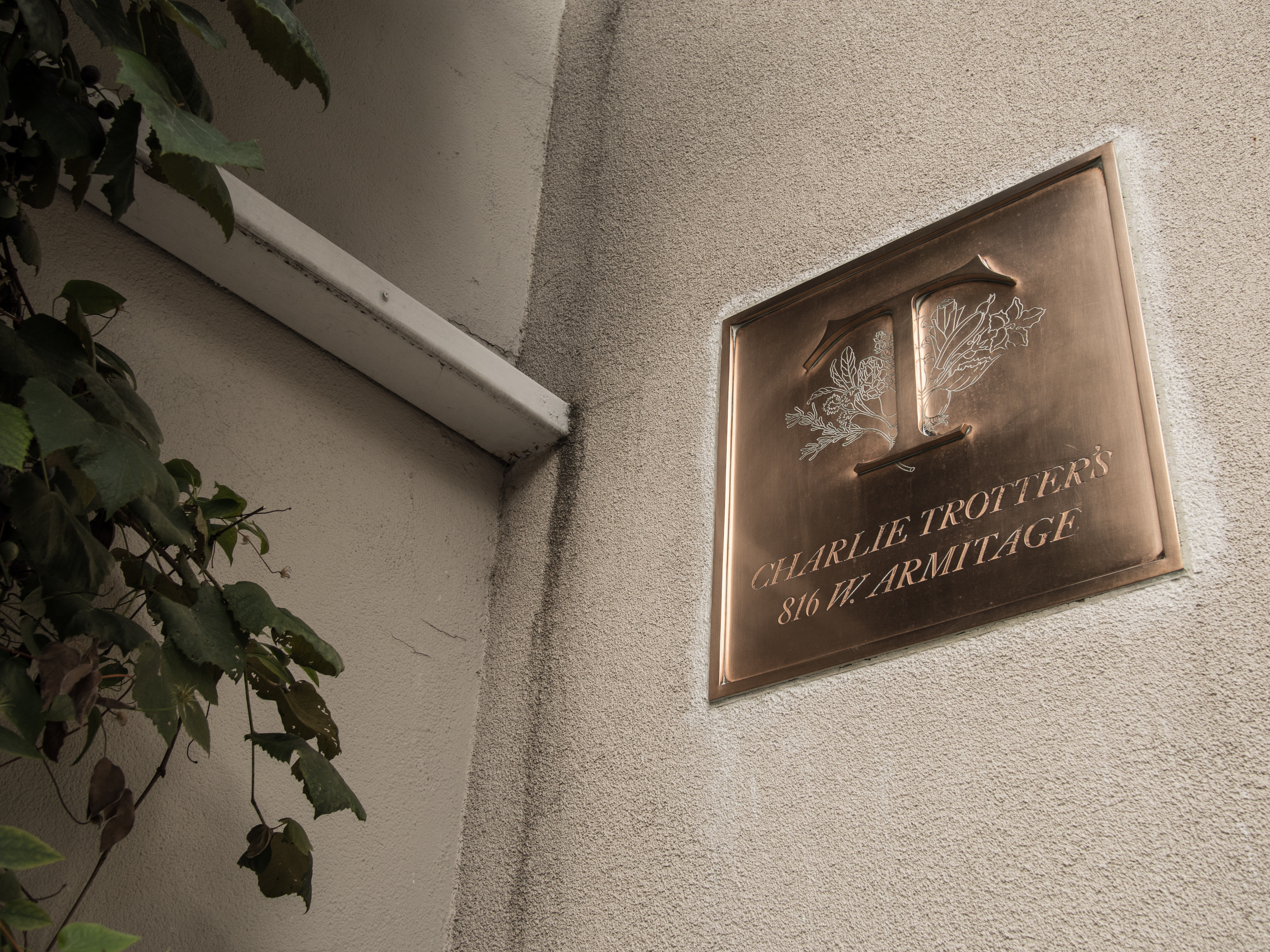
Sign outside Charlie Trotter's

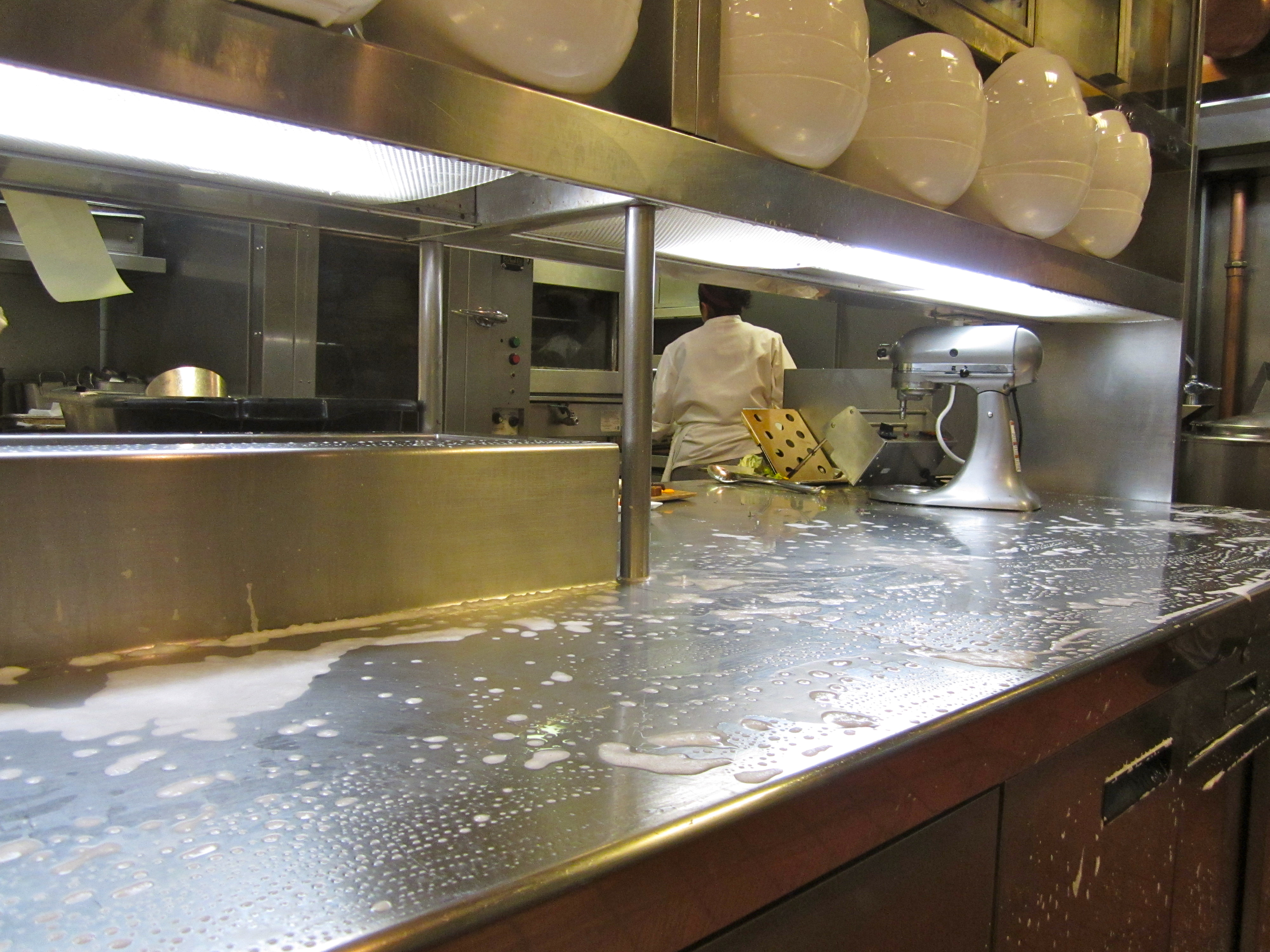
Interior of Charlie Trotter's kitchen

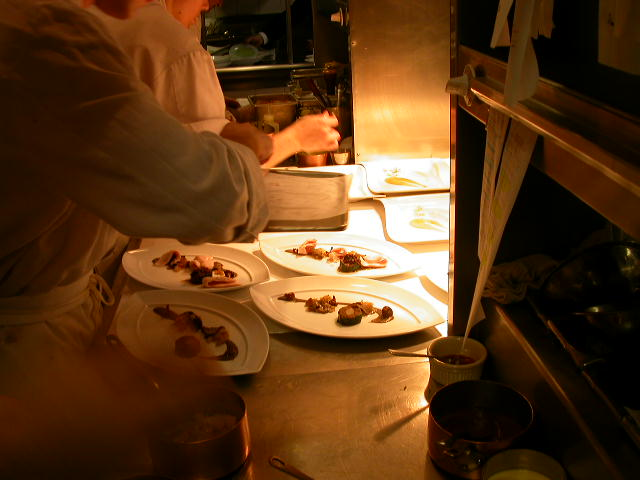
Charlie Trotter's poularde dish

- Charlie Trotter's restaurant in Chicago opened in 1987. It was named as the 30th-best restaurant in the world by Restaurant Magazine, and 5th-best in the United States in 2007. In 2010 Charlie Trotter's was one of three restaurants in Chicago to be awarded two stars by the Michelin Guide. In the following year's Michelin Guide, the restaurant again was rated with two stars. On December 31, 2011, Trotter announced that the restaurant would close in August 2012, citing a desire to travel and to pursue a master's degree.
- Trotter also owned Trotter's To Go at 1337 W. Fullerton, a high-end delicatessen and catering store in Lincoln Park, Chicago. This closed in July 2012.
- In 2008, Trotter opened his second namesake restaurant on the Las Vegas Strip at The Palazzo hotel known as Restaurant Charlie. The restaurant garnered extraordinary praise from critics and received the Michelin Guide One Star award in 2009. The restaurant also received the 2009 James Beard Award for "Best New Restaurant". Within the restaurant was a smaller, private bar known as Bar Charlie in which diners were seated overlooking the kitchen preparation and received a hands-on experience. It closed in March 2010.
- In 2004, Trotter opened C, a seafood restaurant in Los Cabos, Mexico. It closed in November 2008.
- Trotter had planned to open a restaurant in New York City in a new building being built at One Madison Park, but a foreclosure crisis prevented it.
- In 2014, Trotter's son, Dylan, and Trotter's mother, Dona-Lee Trotter, announced that the nonprofit Trotter Project would open in the original Charlie Trotter's restaurant space on Armitage Avenue. Though the buildings had been put on the market after the restaurant closed in 2012, they were taken off the market. As of 2024, the project's stated mission is: "The Trotter Project nourishes dreams, transforms lives and empowers communities through food, education, and community initiatives".

== Lawsuits ==
Trotter was the subject of a number of lawsuits. In 2003 he was the subject of two class action lawsuits pertaining to the compensation of his employees and alleged violations of labor law, both front-of-the-house (service) and back-of-the-house (cooks). The first, filed by former waiter Kurt Sorensen, alleges that rather than receiving the tips they collected, waiters were paid from a restaurant-wide pool, and their share was significantly lower than the amount they had collected, in violation of minimum wage law. This suit was settled out of court. The second, filed September 17, 2003, by former cook Beverly Kim, alleged that cooks were required to work unpaid overtime. This suit was settled in 2005, resulting in a liability of almost $700,000, though of this only about $300,000 was paid out, as many eligible former employees returned their share.

On June 13, 2013, Trotter was sued by wine collectors Bekim and Ilir Frrokaj, who accused him of selling them a counterfeit bottle of 1945 Domaine de la Romanée-Conti for $46,000; Trotter denied any wrongdoing. The wine was found to be counterfeit when the Frrokajs tried to insure it.

== Personal life ==
Trotter married his first wife, Lisa Ehrlich, on August 31, 1986. They met in 1981 at University of Wisconsin–Madison. Lisa helped open the restaurant and served as its first dining room manager and wine director until the couple divorced in August 1990.

Trotter's second marriage, to Lynn Thomas, produced a son, Dylan, born on May 24, 1991 (Bob Dylan's 50th birthday), who was 22 years old at the time of his father's death.

In February 2010, Trotter married girlfriend Rochelle Smith, who later became his publicist.

A feature-length documentary about his life, titled Love, Charlie: The Rise and Fall of Chef Charlie Trotter, was released in the United States in 2021, and later in Britain.

== Death and legacy ==
On November 5, 2013, Trotter's son Dylan found him unresponsive in their Lincoln Park home. Trotter was taken to Northwestern Memorial Hospital, where he was pronounced dead as a result of a stroke. Former understudy Graham Elliot called Trotter a "mentor, trailblazer, philosopher, artist, teacher [and] leader." Charlie Trotter's spirit of mentorship continues via The Trotter Project, a 501(c)(3) charitable organization created by family, co-workers and friends including Homaro Cantu, Trotter's mother Dona-Lee, sister Anne, brothers Scott and Tom, and his son Dylan.

== Published works ==
- Charlie Trotter's 1994 ISBN 0-89815-628-9
- Charlie Trotter's Vegetables 1996 ISBN 0-89815-838-9
- Charlie Trotter's Seafood 1997 ISBN 0-89815-898-2
- Gourmet Cooking for Dummies 1997 ISBN 0-7645-5029-2
- Charlie Trotter's Desserts 1998 ISBN 0-89815-815-X
- The Kitchen Sessions With Charlie Trotter 1999 ISBN 0-89815-997-0
- Charlie Trotter Cooks at Home 2000 ISBN 1-58008-250-5
- Charlie Trotter's Meat and Game 2001 ISBN 1-58008-238-6
- Workin' More Kitchen Sessions With Charlie Trotter 2004 ISBN 1-58008-613-6
- Homecooking with Charlie Trotter 2009

Coauthored

- Clarke, Paul and Charlie Trotter. Lessons in Excellence from Charlie Trotter 1999 ISBN 0-89815-908-3
- Lawler, Edmund and Charlie Trotter. Lessons in Service from Charlie Trotter 2001 ISBN 1-58008-315-3
- Trotter, Charlie and Roxanne Klein. Raw 2003 ISBN 1-58008-470-2
- Trotter, Wareing, Hill and Hall. Knife Skills in the Kitchen 2008 ISBN 978-0-7566-3391-2

== Awards and honors ==
- Culinary Hall of Fame

The Best Restaurant in the World for Wine and Food, 1998 The Grand Award, 1993 – 2012 Wine Enthusiast America's Best Wine-Driven Restaurants, 2006 International Food Manufacturers Association Silver Plate Award Winner, 2008 Gold Plate Award Winner, 2008

The James Beard Foundation Best Food Photography, Meat & Game, 2003 Outstanding Service, 2002 Outstanding Restaurant, 2000 Best National Television Cooking Show for "The Kitchen Sessions, with Charlie Trotter," 2000 Best Food Photography, Desserts, 1999 Outstanding Chef Award, 1999 Who's Who in Food & Beverage Award, 1996 Outstanding Wine Service, 1993 Best Chef, Midwest, 1992 Humanitarian of The Year 2012

Nation's Restaurant News 50 Power Players 2000 Fine Dining Hall of Fame (elected by peers), 1991 Chicago Tribune Four Stars (highest rating) Crain's Chicago Business Four Forks (highest rating)

== See also ==
- List of American restaurateurs
