= Uncropped =

- Poster
- Directed by: D.W. Young
- Produced by: D.W. Young; Judith Mizrachy
- Starring: James Hamilton
- Cinematography: Marika Hacking; Francesco Saviano
- Edited by: D.W. Young
- Music by: David Ullmann
- Distributed by: Greenwich Entertainment
- Release date: November 11, 2023 (DOC NYC)
- Running time: 111 minutes
- Country: United States
- Language: English

Uncropped is a 2023 American documentary film which explores the career of photographer James Hamilton, known for his work at the Village Voice, Harper's Bazaar, and the New York Observer. The film is produced, edited, and directed by D.W. Young.

== Reception ==
On the review aggregator website Rotten Tomatoes, 90% of 10 critics' reviews are positive, with an average rating of 7.5/10.

Owen Gleiberman of Variety wrote, "Uncropped gets you so hooked on James Hamilton's photographs it makes you want to share them with the world."
