= Moby Doc =

2021 documentary film about Moby

- Poster
- Directed by: Rob Gordon Bralver
- Written by: Moby; Rob Gordon Bralver
- Produced by: Rob Gordon Bralver
- Starring: Moby; David Lynch; Julie Mintz; Gary Baseman
- Cinematography: Nathan Haugaard
- Edited by: Rob Gordon Bralver
- Music by: Moby
- Production company: Little Walnut Productions
- Distributed by: Greenwich Entertainment
- Release date: May 28, 2021
- Running time: 92 minutes
- Country: United States
- Language: English

Moby Doc is a 2021 American documentary film about the life and career of musician Moby. It was co-written by Moby and Rob Gordon Bralver, who also directed and produced the film. It was released theatrically by Greenwich Entertainment and on digital platforms on May 28, 2021, the same day as Moby's album Reprise.

== Background ==
A previous incarnation of a documentary about Moby had been produced by another filmmaker, but Moby felt the film was "very plain" and rejected it. After being introduced to Moby and collaborating on several music video projects together, Bralver viewed a cut of that earlier film with Moby about a year after it had been abandoned, then suggested to rework it by deleting almost the entirety of the footage shot to date, and shooting all new content while approaching the documentary in a completely different and unconventional way, to which Moby agreed. The original idea was to document Moby making an acoustic album, but the record never got finished. It was subsequently determined that the documentary would be a therapeutic, psychological portrait and biography of Moby's entire life, career, and animal rights activism.

Moby and Bralver set themselves two rules when making the film, which were to produce something honest and that was idiosyncratic and unlike other music documentaries they had seen. This was influenced by Moby having judged at the Tribeca Film Festival and the International Documentary Association, which made him realise that many documentaries "conform to the same basic chronological structure." Moby was unaware on how difficult it was to make the film in terms of logistics and the bureaucratic challenges that were faced. Despite this, Moby felt "quite proud" of the finished product. Bralver has cited his main influences on the creative direction of the film to be "the music videos of Spike Jonze and Michel Gondry and Julian Schnabel's The Diving Bell and the Butterfly".

== Filming ==
The documentary includes footage filmed with an Alexa Classic, Red Epic, an 8K drone, Canon C100 & 5D cameras, and from a mobile phone. It also features videos taken from YouTube. Moby found that filling in gaps in the film's narrative was easily overcome by taking his Canon 5D camera into his backyard and filming, which cost nothing and allowed greater creative freedom. Bralver was able to locate rare archival footage of Moby, some of which the musician himself was unaware of its existence.

== Reception ==
On the review aggregator website Rotten Tomatoes, 50% of 22 critics' reviews are positive, with an average rating of 6/10. Metacritic, which uses a weighted average, assigned the film a score of 52 out of 100, based on seven critics, indicating "mixed or average" reviews.
