= American Trial: The Eric Garner Story =

Courtroom drama film about the trial that never followed the death of Eric Garner

American Trial: the Eric Garner Story is a 2019 unscripted narrative film directed by Roee Messinger.

== Background ==
The film shows the trial that could have happened following the killing of Eric Garner at the hands of the police in the infamous police brutality case that took place in Staten Island, New York on July 17, 2014. Daniel Pantaleo, the policeman that held Eric Garner in what proved to be a lethal chokehold was never prosecuted for any crime.

== Plot ==
The film shows the trial that could have followed Garner's death if the New York City Grand Jury had decided to prosecute the police officer. Messinger used the real witnesses who would have testified had the case been tried, including an eye witness, forensic pathologists and police use of force experts as well as real criminal attorneys.

The film premiered at the 2019 New York Film Festival to rave reviews and was later distributed by Passion River Films during the COVID-19 pandemic.
