= Wild Man Blues =

1997 documentary film about Woody Allen

- Film poster
- Directed by: Barbara Kopple
- Produced by: Jean Doumanian
- Starring: Woody Allen; New Orleans Jazz Band
- Cinematography: Tom Hurwitz
- Edited by: Lawrence Silk
- Production companies: Sweetland Films; Magnolia Productions
- Distributed by: Fine Line Features
- Release date: January 1997
- Running time: 105 minutes
- Country: United States
- Languages: French, English, Italian

Wild Man Blues is a 1997 American documentary film directed by Barbara Kopple, about the musical avocation of actor/director/comic Woody Allen. The film takes its name from a jazz composition by Jelly Roll Morton (with Louis Armstrong often credited as co-composer due to his influential arrangement), recorded by Morton, Armstrong, and many others.

== Theme ==
The film depicts Allen's love of early 20th-century New Orleans music by preserving performances on the 1996 tour in Europe by his New Orleans Jazz Band. Allen has played clarinet with this band for more than 25 years.

The film ends with a family lunch that is attended by Allen, his wife, sister, and parents. Allen asks that his parents offer reflections about him as an aspiring musician during his youth. Instead, his mother offers significant criticism. She criticises his choice of career, his character, and his decision to marry an Asian woman. In response, Woody criticises his mother for repeatedly beating him as a child, and sending him to Hebrew school (which Allen refers to as "time wasting junk"). The lunch ends abruptly after Allen describes the event as "the lunch from hell".

== Musicians ==
- Dan Barrett, on trombone
- Simon Wettenhall, on trumpet
- John Gill, on drums and vocals
- Greg Cohen, on bass
- Cynthia Sayer, on piano
- Eddy Davis, band director, and on banjo
- Woody Allen, on clarinet

Although their European tour is the primary focus, the film was also notable as the first major public showcase for Allen's relationship with Soon-Yi Previn.

== Formats published ==
The film was originally released on VHS. In April 2012 the film was featured as a bonus DVD on an Australian box set of Allen's films, and similarly appeared as an extra in a UK Region 2 box set in July 2014. Although the film is not available as a standalone DVD in any of the main English-speaking countries, it has been released singly in various Region 2 pressings around Europe, with relevant (optional) subtitles.

- The film soundtrack was released on RCA Compact Disc and later digitally

== Reception ==
On review aggregator Rotten Tomatoes, the film holds an 86% approval rating based on 37 reviews. Roger Ebert stated "[Kopple] might seem an unlikely choice for this material, but no doubt her track record gained Allen's trust." Maitland McDonagh of TV Guide commented "Die-hard Woody Allen fans will be grateful for even these small glimpses of their idol at his most unguarded, but the less-devoted would be better off renting ANNIE HALL." Janet Maslin of The New York Times wrote 'In her unexpectedly delightful documentary about Woody Allen as jazz musician, Barbara Kopple demonstrates cinema verite at its most seductive. Her Wild Man Blues invites its audience to take a grand tour of Europe, listen to jauntily exhilarating music and regard Mr. Allen in a colorful new light." Keith Phipps of The A.V. Club stated "...Wild Man Blues nicely conveys a sense of its subject's dedication to his craft... Those interested in Allen simply because he's Allen will want to see Wild Man Blues, but in the end, Kopple has been given a couple of interesting subjects (New Orleans jazz in its current state and Woody Allen), and her film fails to get at the heart of either."
