= William S. Reese =

American author and bookseller (1955–2018)

- Born: July 29, 1955; Havre de Grace, Maryland
- Died: June 4, 2018 (aged 62); Havre de Grace, Maryland
- Education: Yale University
- Occupation: Antiquarian bookseller

William Sherman Reese (July 29, 1955 - June 4, 2018) was an American bookseller and founder of the William Reese Company. Over a 44-year career, he became known as a leading figure in the rare book world, with particular expertise in book history and Americana.

== Biography ==
Reese was born to William Blaine Reese and Katherine Reese (née Jackson) on July 29, 1955, in Havre de Grace, Maryland. He had a sister, Barbara. He attended Gilman School in Baltimore, Maryland, where he was the president of his senior class and from which he graduated in 1973. He then attended Yale.

Reese married Margaret Hurt, who died in 2002. He later married Margaret Hurt's sister, Dorothy Hurt.

Reese died of prostate cancer on June 4, 2018.

== Bookselling career ==
Reese's first bibliographic publications and antiquarian sales occurred while he was an undergraduate at Yale in the mid-1970s. At this time, he was a partner in the rare book firm Frontier Americana. He received a B.A. in history from Yale in 1977. His senior thesis was titled Winnowers of the Past: The Americanist Tradition in the Nineteenth Century. After graduation, Reese worked with bookseller Fred White Jr in Texas.

Reese founded the William Reese Company in 1979, in New Haven, Connecticut. Over the next forty years, the company became the leader in the Americana market, with the best items and the best collections passing through Reese's hands. The company issued hundreds of catalogues of American materials. Reese also worked closely with Yale's Beinecke Rare Book & Manuscript Library to shape their Americana collections.

In 1998, the William Reese Company began offering Fellowships in the Print Culture of the Americas, to fund research in American book history.

His essay, "The Rare Book Market Today," was published in 2000 and was the basis of a two-part series updating the rare book market in 2025 in The Book Collector.

His collection of essays, Collectors, Booksellers, and Libraries: Essays on Americanists and the Rare Book Market. was characterized as an appropriate tribute to his extensive knowledge. Reese was widely regarded as "the greatest American antiquarian bookseller of his generation, highly respected for his extensive knowledge of Americana, exploration, natural history, color plate books, and literature." Reese was profiled in the 2019 documentary The Booksellers, directed by D.W. Young and memorialized in The Papers of the Bibliographical Society of America.

His private collection was sold at Christie's in 2022.

== Selected publications ==
- Reese, William S., and Grolier Club. 2022. Stamped with a National Character : Nineteenth Century American Color Plate Books. New York: The Grolier Club.
- Reese, William S., and Ink, Inc. 2018. Collectors, Booksellers, and Libraries : Essays on Americanists and the Rare Book Market. New Haven: Overland Press.
- Reese, William S. 2017. The Federal Hundred. New Haven: William Reese Company.
- Reese, William S. 2017. The Best of the West : 250 Classic Works of Western Americana. New Haven: William Reese Company.
- Vinson, Michael, and William S. Reese. 2016. Edward Eberstadt & Sons: Rare Booksellers of Western Americana. Norman: University of Oklahoma Press.
- Reese, William S., James N. Green, and John C. Van Horne. 2001. The Michael Zinman Collection of Early American Imprints. Philadelphia: Library Co. of Philadelphia.
- Reese, William. "The Rare Book Market Today." Yale University Library Gazette, vol. 75, nos. 3–4, April 2000, pp. 146–165.
- Reese, William S., and Beinecke Rare Book and Manuscript Library. 1991. A Herman Melville Collection Exhibited at the Beinecke Rare Book and Manuscript Library, Yale University : On the Occasion of the 100th Anniversary of His Death. New Haven: Beinecke Rare Book and Manuscript Library.
- Reese, William S. "Joseph Sabin," American Book Collector 5, no. 1 (1984):3-24. ISSN 0196-5654
