= Dear Mr. Brody =

- Theatrical release poster
- Directed by: Keith Maitland
- Produced by: Keith Maitland; Melissa Robyn Glassman; Megan Gilbride; Sarah Wilson
- Cinematography: Sarah Wilson; Keith Maitland
- Edited by: Austin Reedy
- Music by: Osei Essed
- Production companies: Topic Studios; Impact Partners; Artemis Rising Foundation; Go-Valley; Twelve21 Productions; Hidden Candy; Pressman Film; Alive Films
- Distributed by: Discovery+; Greenwich Entertainment
- Release dates: March 16, 2021 (SXSW); March 4, 2022 (United States)
- Running time: 96 minutes
- Country: United States
- Language: English

Dear Mr. Brody is a 2021 documentary film directed and produced by Keith Maitland. The film centers on letters written to Michael James Brody Jr. (born October 31, 1948; died January 26, 1973) from the general public in response to Brody Jr.'s announcement (in early January 1970) that he would give away his inherited fortune (purported to be 25 million USD) to those in need.

== Synopsis ==
When 21-year-old Brody Jr. (heir to the Jelke oleomargarine company) announced his intention to give away his inheritance to anyone in need, he ignited a spiral of events that captured the media's attention. Brody, along with his newlywed wife Renee, became instant worldwide celebrities who were then mobbed by the American public, scrutinized by the press, and overwhelmed by an avalanche of letters responding to his offer. Nearly fifty-years after Brody Jr.'s death, a sampling of the enormous surviving unopened letters sent to him was opened for the camera, exposing a snapshot of America's hippie, communal, zeitgeist. In Maitland's follow-up to his 2016 mostly-animated documentary TOWER, he reveals the story of Brody Jr. — and the countless people who sought his help — to create an exposé on desire, need, philanthropy, and love.

== Release ==
The film had its virtual premiere at South by Southwest on March 16, 2021. The film's world premiere was scheduled for the Tribeca Film Festival in April 2020, but the festival was cancelled due to the COVID-19 pandemic. It was also selected to screen at the Telluride Film Festival in September 2020, prior to its cancellation. In October 2021, Discovery+ and Greenwich Entertainment were announced to have acquired distribution rights to the film. It is scheduled to be released on March 4, 2022, prior to streaming on Discovery+ on April 28, 2022.

== Reception ==
The film received generally positive reviews from critics. On the review aggregator website Rotten Tomatoes, 96% of 28 reviews are positive, with an average rating of 7.4/10. The website's critical consensus reads, "Dear Mr. Brody uses its stranger-than-fiction true story to take a touching look at how an act of kindness can reverberate for years." Metacritic, which uses a weighted average, assigned a score of 78 out of 100 based on eight critics, indicating "generally favorable" reviews.
