= Happy Clothes: A Film About Patricia Field =

2023 documentary film

- Film poster
- Directed by: Michael Selditch
- Produced by: Samuel Paul; Michael Selditch; Donald Zuckerman
- Cinematography: Kris Lindenmuth
- Edited by: Robert Tate
- Production company: Zuckerman Entertainment
- Distributed by: Greenwich Entertainment
- Release date: June 15, 2023 (Tribeca Festival)
- Running time: 100 minutes
- Country: United States
- Language: English
- Box office: $17,943

Happy Clothes: A Film About Patricia Field is a 2023 American documentary film about the costume designer Patricia Field. It is produced and directed by Michael Selditch. It premiered at the Tribeca Festival in 2023.

== Reception ==
Alissa Wilkinson of The New York Times wrote, "There's just a lot here. But with a subject like Field, the mild chaos feels pleasantly appropriate." Pat Mullen of POV wrote, "Happy Clothes offers an upbeat portrait of the New Yorker with the cherry-red hair who is forever on the cusp of contemporary fashion. Director Michael Selditch mostly does away with bio-doc convention to illustrate Field's fabulous life, work, and fashion sense."
