= IMordecai =

American feature film about a Holocaust survivor

iMordecai
- Theatrical release poster
- Directed by: Marvin Samel
- Written by: Marvin Samel; Rudy Gaines; Dahlia Heyman
- Produced by: Marvin Samel; Dahlia Heyman
- Starring: Judd Hirsch; Carol Kane; Sean Astin; Azia Dinea Hale; Stephanie J. Block
- Cinematography: Will Turner
- Edited by: Rick Grayson
- Music by: Matthew Kajcienski
- Distributed by: Greenwich Entertainment
- Release dates: October 28, 2022 (Naples International Film Festival); February 24, 2023 (United States)
- Country: United States
- Language: English
- Budget: $5,000,000.00
- Box office: $140,272

iMordecai is a 2022 dramatic comedy film written, directed, and produced by Marvin Samel. The film, about a Holocaust survivor whose life changes when his son buys him an iPhone, stars Judd Hirsch, Carol Kane, and Sean Astin. Based on Samel's real life experiences, iMordecai is his directorial debut.

Greenwich Entertainment released iMordecai in select U.S. cinemas on February 24, 2023. The film’s digital and VOD release occurred on April 11, 2023.

== Premise ==
A Holocaust survivor’s confrontation with an iPhone challenges him to face the realities of the modern world.

== Cast ==
- Judd Hirsch as Mordecai Samel
- Carol Kane as Fela
- Sean Astin as Marvin
- Azia Dinea Hale as Nina
- Stephanie J. Block as Netta
- Nick Puga as Jared

== Production ==
In 2014, Marvin Samel’s wife Netta gave birth to their twin daughters, and his mother Fela was diagnosed with dementia. As a coping mechanism, Samel began compiling the colorful stories of his family’s past that he had shared in order to entertain the audiences at cigar events he hosted.

He decided the stories could be a basis for a film so started writing a screenplay and engaged veteran screenplay writer Rudy Gaines as his collaborator. When the script was completed, Dahlia Heyman, an award-winning screenwriter and former creative executive at World Film Group, came on board as a Producer. She introduced Samel to industry veteran, and award-winner in his own right, Allen Bain, who agreed to be the film’s Executive Producer.

Heyman and Bain connected Samel with award-winning casting director Avy Kaufman who arranged a meeting between Judd Hirsch and Samel. Tony Award winner Stephanie J. Block signed on to play Samel’s wife Netta and a casting call turned up newcomer, Azia Dinea Hale, to play a key role in the film as a young iPhone techie.

iMordecai was shot on location in Florida. The locations were personal to Samel and his parents as he made use of his parents' favorite spots for locations. Even though the film is shot in Miami, it has a New York sensibility — the characters are all New Yorkers, via Poland, Siberia, Israel — as Samel’s formative years were spent in New York.

== Release ==
iMordecai had its theatrical release in South Florida, as Samel wanted to acknowledge the contribution and support he had received from the South Florida community where the film takes place, was shot and produced. It then opened in New York City at the Quad Cinema.
