= Peter Asher: Everywhere Man =

2025 documentary film

- Directed by: Daniel Geller; Dayna Goldfine
- Produced by: Dayna Goldfine; Dan Geller
- Edited by: Darren Lund
- Music by: Laurence Juber; Jeff Alan Ross
- Production company: Getter/Goldfine Productions/Wwol
- Distributed by: Greenwich Entertainment
- Release dates: August 2025 (Telluride); 19 June 2026
- Running time: 117 minutes
- Country: United Kingdom
- Language: English

Peter Asher: Everywhere Man is a 2025 American documentary film directed by Daniel Geller and Dayna Goldfine covering the life and career of British musician and producer Peter Asher.

== Synopsis ==
Framed by clips from his autobiographical stage show featuring anecdotes and music, the film presents, using archive material and contemporary interviews, the history of Asher's personal and professional life from his childhood acting career, through chart success with the music duo Peter and Gordon, his role as Head of A&R for The Beatles at Apple Corps, to his move to the United States and his subsequent career in artist management and record production

== Cast ==
In order of appearance.

- Steve Martin
- Eric Idle
- Jane Asher
- Gordon Waller
- Paul McCartney (voice)
- Lyle Lovett
- Victoria Asher
- Twiggy
- Danny Kortchmar
- Betsy Asher
- Marianne Faithfull (voice)
- Pattie Boyd
- John Dunbar
- Barry Miles
- Yoko Ono (archive footage)
- John Lennon (archive footage)
- Paul Jones
- Chris O'Dell
- James Taylor
- John Boylan
- Carole King
- Leland Sklar
- Kate Taylor
- Linda Ronstadt
- Andrew Gold (archive footage)
- Waddy Wachtel
- Ben Fong Torres
- Wendy Asher
- Natalie Merchant
- Robin Williams (archive footage)
- Paul Shaffer
- Cathy Shaffer
- Rufus Wainwright
- "Weird Al" Yankovic

== Release ==
The film premiered at the 2025 Telluride Film Festival.

== Reception ==
Andrew Pulver in The Guardian gave the film 4/5 stars writing: "Smartly structured around Asher’s current anecdotes-and-music live show, the film stitches together a collection of clips, audio and musical performances that gallops through his personal backstory. ... While the film clearly acknowledges the debt to McCartney’s songs, ... it’s perhaps not quite ready to admit that without this connection, none of what followed would have happened at all."

Daniel Fienberg wrote in The Hollywood Reporter: "At 117 minutes, Everywhere Man is a sprawling film, one that goes from exciting and unpredictable to the stuff of countless rock-n-roll biopics, but the directors treat everything equally — or else lack the material to make the second half of the documentary anywhere near as engaging as the first."

Owen Gleiberman in Variety wrote: "An engaging look at a fabled figure the film is a bit too infatuated with."

On the review aggregator site Rotten Tomatoes, the film has a 97% approval rating based on 29 critics.

Metacritic gives the film a score of 78/100 based on 6 reviews.

== Accolades ==
- Nominee, 2026 Critics' Choice Documentary Award.
- Winner, the Musical Crossroads Award at the 2026 Long Island Music and Entertainment Hall of Fame Music Documentary Film Festival.
