= Desert One (film) =

- Official poster
- Directed by: Barbara Kopple
- Written by: Francisco Bello
- Produced by: Barbara Kopple; David Cassidy; Eric Forman
- Cinematography: Asad Faruqi; Gary Griffin; Tom Kaufman; Gelareh Kiazand
- Edited by: Francisco Bello; Fabian Caballero
- Music by: Wendy Blackstone
- Production companies: History Films; Cabin Creek Films
- Distributed by: Greenwich Entertainment
- Release dates: September 8, 2019 (TIFF); August 21, 2020 (United States)
- Running time: 107 minutes
- Country: United States
- Languages: English; Persian

Desert One is a 2019 American documentary film directed and produced by Barbara Kopple. It follows Operation Eagle Claw, a failed US mission in April 1980 that aimed to end the Iran hostage crisis by rescuing 52 embassy staff held hostage.

The film had its world premiere at the Toronto International Film Festival on September 8, 2019. It was released on August 21, 2020, by Greenwich Entertainment.

== Synopsis ==
The film follows Operation Eagle Claw, a mission that was an attempt to end the Iran hostage crisis by rescuing 52 embassy staff held hostage at the Embassy of the United States, Tehran. Former U.S. President Jimmy Carter, Walter Mondale, Ted Koppel, David Aaron, Mahmoud Abedini, Robert Gates, Wade Ishimoto, John Limbert, and former hostage-takers and hostages appear in the film.

== Release ==
The film had its world premiere at the Toronto International Film Festival on September 8, 2019. It also screened at DOC NYC on November 8, 2019, and the AFI Fest on November 18, 2019. In April 2020, Greenwich Entertainment acquired U.S. distribution rights to the film. It was released on August 21, 2020.

== Reception ==
Desert One received positive reviews from film critics. It holds an 88% approval rating on review aggregator website Rotten Tomatoes, based on 50 reviews, with an average of 8/10. The site's critical consensus reads, "Comprehensive without getting bogged down in details, Desert One offers a fascinating look at a daring military mission that ended in defeat." On Metacritic, the film holds a rating of 80 out of 100, based on 13 critics, indicating "generally favorable" reviews.
