= College Behind Bars =

2019 American TV documentary series

- Genre: Documentary
- Directed by: Lynn Novick
- Composer: Jongnic Bontemps
- Country of origin: United States
- Original language: English
- No. of seasons: 1
- No. of episodes: 4

Production
- Executive producer: Ken Burns
- Producers: Lynn Novick; Sarah Botstein; Mariah Doran; Salimah El-Amin; Stephen Sowers
- Cinematography: Nadia Hallgren; Buddy Squires
- Editor: Tricia Reidy

Original release
- Network: PBS
- Release: November 25 – November 26, 2019

College Behind Bars is a 2019 American television documentary series, directed by Lynn Novick, which originally aired on PBS. It focuses on the lives and academic careers of inmates in the Bard Prison Initiative.

== Synopsis ==
Incarcerated individuals at Eastern Correctional Facility and Taconic Correctional Facility are studying for either BA or AA degrees from Bard College as part of a prison education program. The documentary highlights important feats and milestones in the incarcerated individuals' college careers such as their thesis defenses, graduation, and victory over the Harvard debate team.

== Reception ==
The documentary received generally positive reviews. Daniel Fienberg of The Hollywood Reporter wrote "it's so humane and emotional that it will probably have you brushing away tears as you're pondering bigger questions." Hank Stuever of The Washington Post called the documentary "inspiring" and Ashlie D. Stevens of Salon wrote "[one] of the strongest elements ... is that it assesses all the complexities of education in the prison system."
