= Hello, Bookstore =

2022 documentary film

Hello, Bookstore is a 2022 documentary film. The film tells the story of "The Bookstore" in Lenox, Massachusetts.
