= Ferrante Fever =

2017 documentary film directed by Giacomo Durzi

- Directed by: Giacomo Durzi
- Written by: Giacomo Durzi
- Starring: Hillary Clinton, Jonathan Franzen, Ann Goldstein
- Production companies: Malia Film; Rai Cinema
- Release date: 2 October 2017
- Country: Italy
- Language: English

Ferrante Fever is a documentary film about Italian writer Elena Ferrante, directed by Giacomo Durzi.

== Reception ==
On Rotten Tomatoes, the film holds an approval rating of 47% based on 15 reviews, with an average rating of 4.5/10. According to Metacritic, which assigned a weighted average score of 52 out of 100 based on 6 critics, the film received "mixed or average reviews".

Leslie Felperin of The Guardian called it an "enticing portrayal". Frank Scheck of The Hollywood Reporter wrote, "Ferrante Fever delivers a fan-friendly examination of the novelist and her works, and what it lacks in depth it more than makes up for with enthusiasm".

The Times's chief film critic Kevin Maher panned the film in his 1-star review, writing, "The overall impression is of a clueless film toadying up to an uninterested novelist". Robert Abele of the Los Angeles Times noticed that the film was "unlikely to satisfy your literary curiosity". Andrew Lapin of NPR criticized the film for having "almost no narrative structure, which is not the sort of thing you want to say about anything associated with the biggest name in modern fiction". Jennifer Szalai of The New York Times deemed the film "bland", concluding, "It quickly becomes clear that the time it takes to sit through this padded mash note would be better spent immersed in Ferrante's mesmerizing work instead".
