= Pitch in for Baseball and Softball =

American nonprofit organization

- Formation: 2005
- Founded: 2005
- Headquarters: Harleysville, Pennsylvania, U.S.
- Key people: Terry Smith, President
- Website: pifbs.org

Pitch in for Baseball and Softball (PIFBS) is a Pennsylvania-based non-profit 501(c)(3) charity dedicated to collecting and distributing new and gently used baseball and softball equipment. This equipment is donated to youth leagues in underserved communities worldwide. As of June 2024, PIFBS has donated equipment to more than 900,000 children located in 117 countries. The organization has supported leagues in places such as the Dominican Republic, Poland, Haiti, Nicaragua, Ghana, Israel, Ukraine, India, China, and the hurricane-affected Gulf Coast region of the United States.

== History ==
PIFBS was founded shortly after Hurricane Katrina. The organization sent donated equipment to the affected areas to help revive their local youth baseball leagues. PIFBS helps communities affected by natural disasters. In June 2011, the organization donated equipment to people in Joplin, Missouri, after a string of tornados hit the area. The organization also works with communities around Philadelphia.

PIFBS has sent equipment to Europe and is credited with helping raise the popularity of baseball in Europe. The Uganda little league team that competed in the 2012 Little League World Series received its equipment from PIFBS. This was captured by filmmaker Jay Shapiro for the 2015 documentary Opposite Field. Shapiro spent two years in Uganda filming baseball players and documenting the country's baseball community.

Pitch in for Baseball (PIFB) became Pitch in for Baseball and Softball in 2018, when PIFB launched Pitch in for Softball (PIFS) started to donate softball equipment. The advisory committee for PIFS were Olympic medalists, Natasha Watley and Crystl Bustos.

== Notable athletes involved ==
- Jimmy Rollins
- Derrek Lee
- Carl Pavano
- Michael Cuddyer
- Natasha Watley
