= D.W. Young =

D.W. Young is a film director, editor, and producer.

== Filmography ==
- The Booksellers (2019)
- Uncropped (2023)
