= Argosy Book Store =

Independent bookstore in New York City

Coordinates: 40.7624°N 73.9691°W

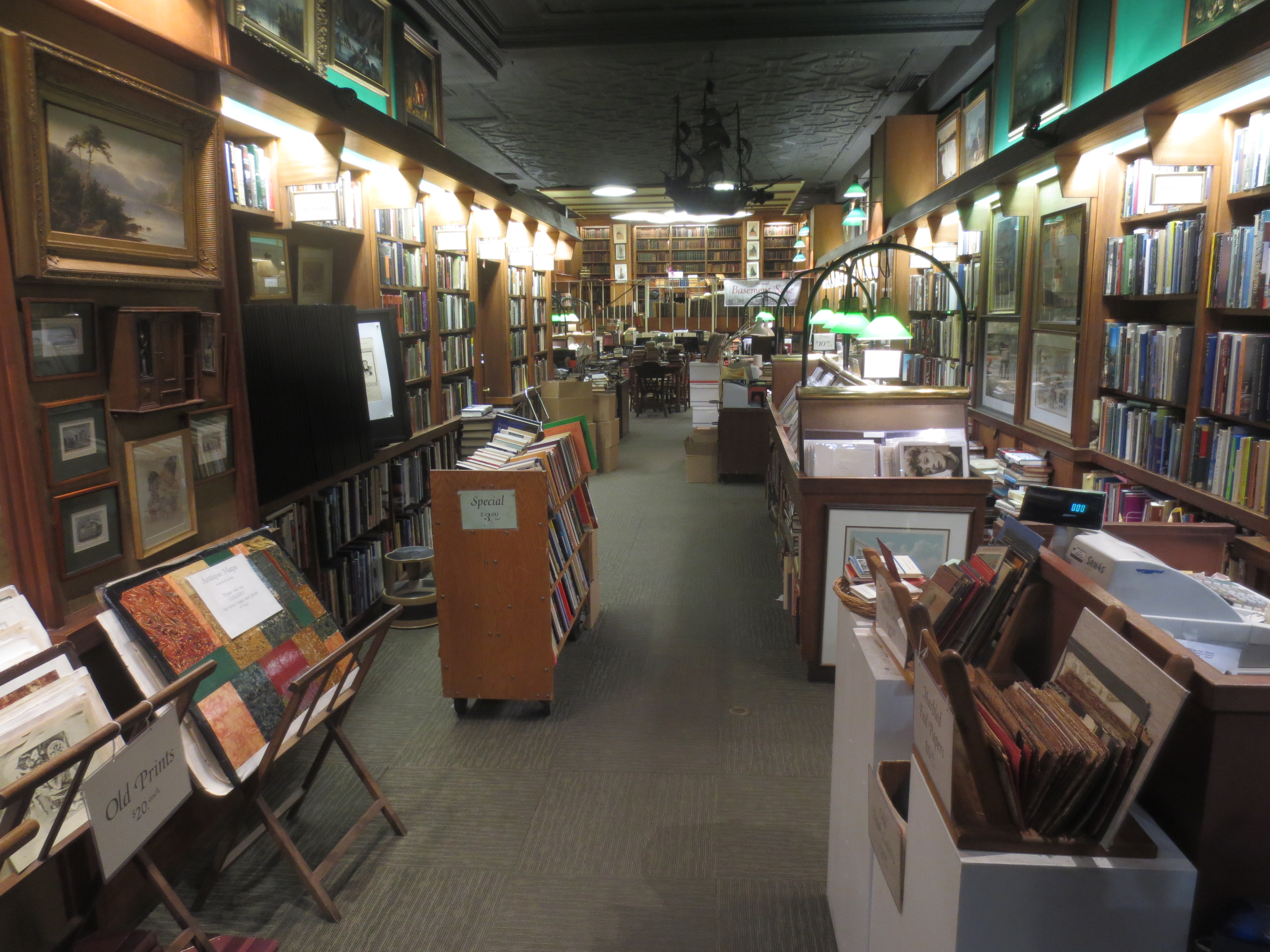
- Argosy Book Store (inside)
- Industry: Specialty retail
- Founded: 1925
- Founder: Louis Cohen
- Headquarters: New York City, United States
- Area served: Worldwide
- Products: Out-of-print and rare books; antique maps and prints; autographs & manuscripts
- Owner: Judith Lowry, Naomi Hample, Adina Cohen, Ben Lowry
- Number of employees: 17
- Website: https://www.argosybooks.com/

The Argosy Book Store is New York City's oldest independent bookstore. Located at 116 East 59th Street, between Park and Lexington Avenues in Midtown Manhattan, it occupies an entire six-story townhouse with various sales floors specializing in first editions, Americana, leather bindings, antique maps and prints, and autographs. The store, also noted for a wide selection of bargain books, has its own framing and shipping departments and owns a large warehouse in Brooklyn.

== History ==
The Argosy was founded in 1925 by Louis Cohen, who picked the name, in part, because it started with the letter "A" and would be listed early in telephone directories. Originally located in the old Bible House on Fourth Avenue's famed "Book Row," it moved to 114 East 59th Street in the 1930s and then moved next door to its current address in 1964 when the previous building was replaced with a skyscraper. Cohen's wife, Ruth Shevin, managed the store's art gallery into her 90s and worked with several other family members over the years. Now in its third generation of family ownership, the store is operated by Cohen's three daughters and grandson.

Since its inception, the Argosy has worked with many prominent customers, including President Franklin D. Roosevelt, who ordered books from an early catalogue, and later First Lady Jacqueline Kennedy, who needed help stocking the White House library with Americana. President Bill Clinton has been a regular customer ever since the owners restored his flood-damaged collection of books in Chappaqua, New York. Other high-profile customers have included Michael Jackson, Stephen Sondheim, Princess Grace, Sally Field, Donatella Versace, Oriana Fallaci, and Kevin Rudd. Patti Smith was briefly an employee in 1967.

In October 2012 the Argosy suffered extensive damage during Hurricane Sandy, when bricks dislodged from the 32nd story of the adjacent building and crashed through the store's roof. The resulting flood affected the top two floors and destroyed many historical artifacts, including acts of Congress signed by Thomas Jefferson. The store made a full recovery by the fall of 2013.

== In popular culture ==
The Argosy, known for its elegant old-world interior, has been used as a setting for movies and TV dramas, including The Front with Woody Allen, Law and Order, and Person of Interest. Alfred Hitchcock's film Vertigo also features a bookstore of the same name situated in San Francisco. It has also been used as a background for fashion shoots and television interviews. It was prominently featured in the 2018 movie Can You Ever Forgive Me? and is among the New York bookstores where the real-life Lee Israel had attempted to sell her forgeries. It was also featured in the 2019 movie The Goldfinch.

The store and its history are one of the subjects of the 2019 documentary The Booksellers. The Argosy was also the subject of an article by Janet Malcolm in The New Yorker.
