= The Booksellers =

2019 documentary film

- Film poster
- Directed by: D. W. Young
- Produced by: D. W. Young, Dan Wechsler, Judith Mizrachy
- Narrated by: Parker Posey
- Distributed by: Greenwich Entertainment
- Release dates: October 2019 (New York Film Festival); March 6, 2020
- Running time: 99 minutes
- Country: United States
- Language: English

The Booksellers is a 2019 American documentary film that was directed, edited, and produced by D. W. Young. It was executive produced by Parker Posey, who also provides narration in the film. The film explores the world of antiquarian and rare book dealers and their bookstores. It focuses primarily on booksellers in New York City, including Jim Cummins, the founder of James Cummins Bookseller; Adina Cohen, Naomi Hample and Judith Lowry, the three sisters of the Argosy Book Store; Stephen Massey, founder of Christie’s NY Book Department; and Nancy Bass Wyden, owner of the Strand Bookstore. Other prominent people featured in the film include Fran Lebowitz, Gay Talese, Justin Croft, Zack Hample, Tom Lecky, Susan Orlean, William S. Reese, Rebecca Romney, A. S. W. Rosenbach, Jay S. Walker, and Kevin Young.

== Release ==
The documentary premiered at the 2019 New York Film Festival and had a limited release in March 2020 that coincided with the annual New York International Antiquarian Book Fair. Due to the COVID-19 pandemic, the film was released as video on demand as part of Greenwich Entertainment's virtual cinema initiative on April 17, 2020.

== Reception ==
On review aggregator Rotten Tomatoes, the film holds an approval rating of 90% based on 63 reviews, with an average rating of 7.2/10. The website's critics consensus reads: "Inviting viewers into a fascinating world of bibliophiles, The Booksellers is a documentary that's easy to curl up and get lost in." On Metacritic, the film has a weighted average score of 72 out of 100, based on 15 critics, indicating "generally favorable reviews". A review in Variety said of the film "Lovely and wistful. 'The Booksellers' is a documentary for anyone who can still look at a book and see a dream, a magic teleportation device, an object that contains the world." NPR's review called the film "beguiling" and noted "most of the story is told by eccentrics you've never heard of but will enjoy meeting." The New York Times review said, "Survival — of books, and of the rare-book business itself — is a major theme of the documentary, which plunges viewers into this world via the passionate, eclectic, undersung people who make it all hum: the booksellers".
