= Lynn Novick =

American director and producer

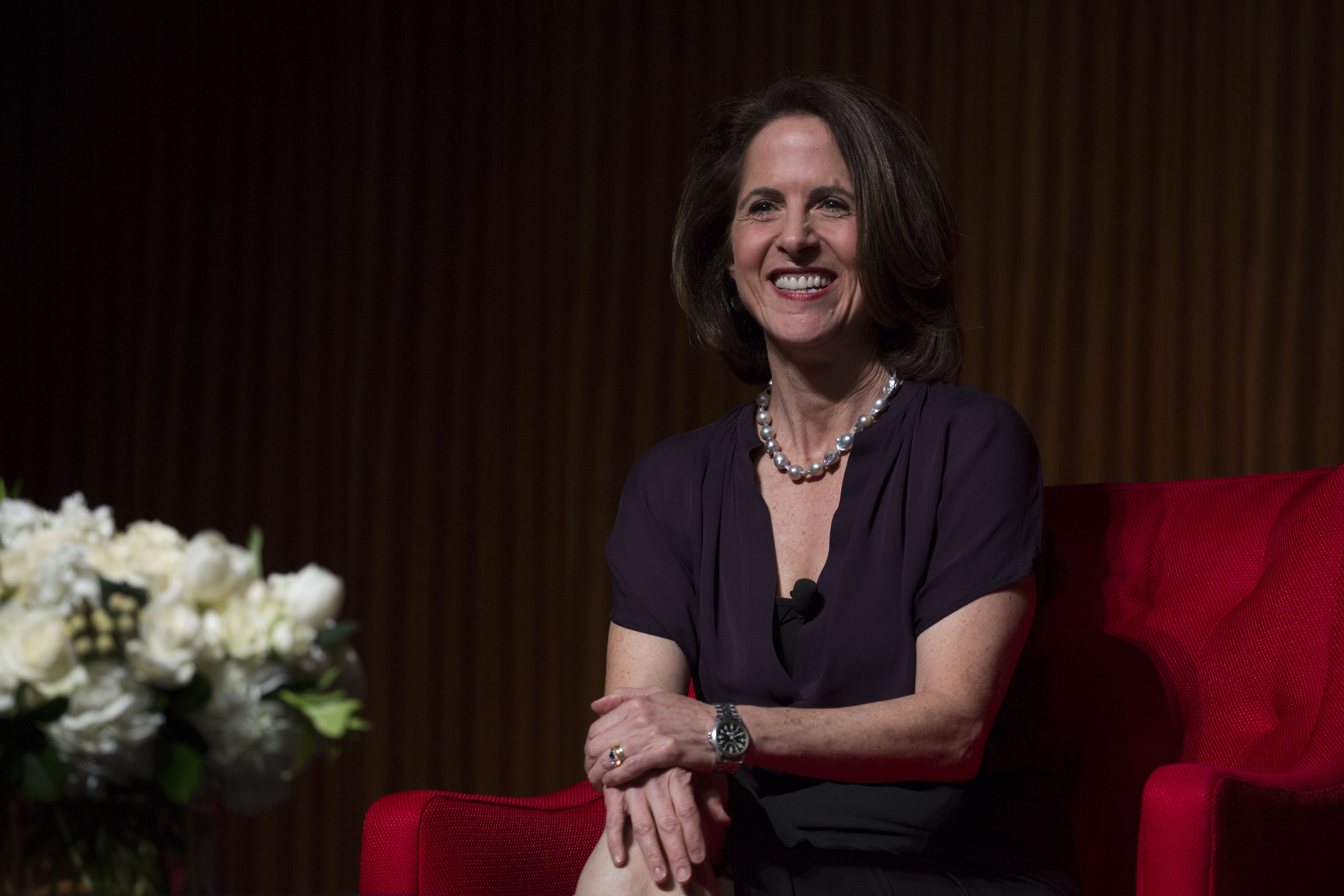
- Novick in 2016
- Born: 1962 (age 63–64)
- Occupations: Director, producer
- Notable work: College Behind Bars

Lynn Novick (born 1962) is an American director and producer of documentary films, widely known for her work with Ken Burns.

== Early life ==
Novick was born in 1962, raised in New York City, and graduated from Horace Mann School in 1979. She graduated magna cum laude from Yale University majoring in American Studies in 1983.

== Career ==
Novick was a research assistant at the Smithsonian Institution's National Museum of American History before beginning her film career as a production assistant at WNET, a public television station in Manhattan. She then worked on Bill Moyers' projects Joseph Campbell and the Power of Myth and A World of Ideas with Bill Moyers before moving to Florentine Films in 1989 to work on Burns's 1990 series, The Civil War, as associate producer for post production.

In 1994, she produced Burns's nine-part series, Baseball, (1994) for which she received an Emmy Award. In 1998, she was director and producer (with Burns) of two-part biographical documentary, Frank Lloyd Wright, for which she received a Peabody Award. In 2001, Novick produced Burns’ 10-part series, Jazz.

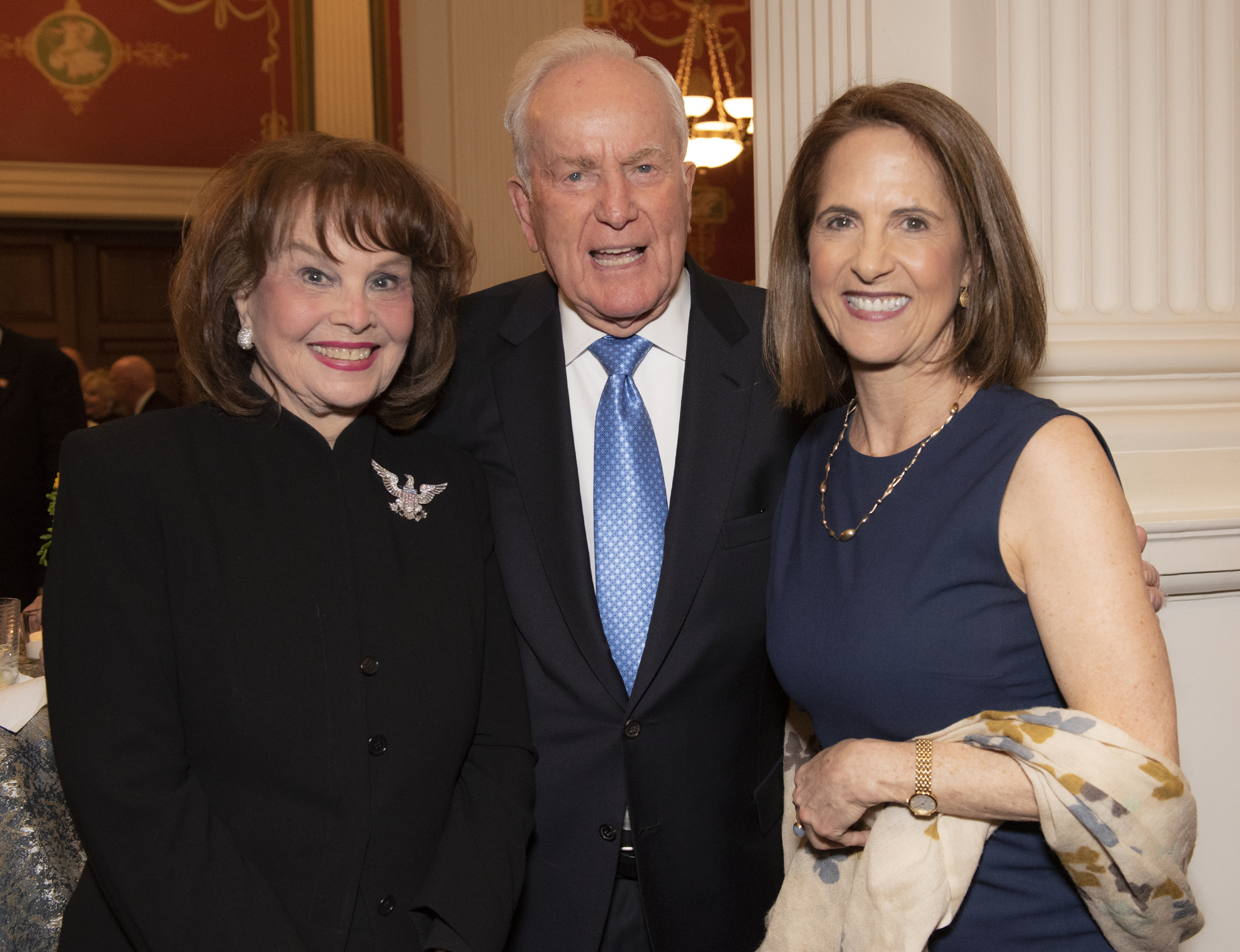
Novick (right) with Lloyd Nelson Hand and Ann Hand in 2020

Among her more recent collaborations with Burns have been The War (2007), Baseball: The Tenth Inning (2010), and Prohibition (2011). Her next collaboration was an 18-hour documentary film series, The Vietnam War, with Burns and Geoffrey Ward, which aired in September 2017. In 2019, her four-part series College Behind Bars, was broadcast on PBS.

On April 5, 2021, a three-episode, six-hour documentary, a recapitulation of Ernest Hemingway's life, labors, and loves, debuted on the Public Broadcasting System, co-produced and directed by Burns and Novick.

In April, 2021, it was announced that Novick would be joining Meadowlark Media as a creative advisor.

In November 2026, she directed a four-part series Crime and Punishment in America, also produced by Ken Burns, which was broadcast on PBS.

== Awards ==
- 1995: Primetime Emmy Award for Outstanding Informational Series or Special for Baseball
