= List of awards and nominations received by American Experience =

Awards and nominations received by American Experience
Awards and nominations
| Award | Wins | Nominations |
| Academy Awards | 0 | 3 |
| Cinema Audio Society Awards | 0 | 4 |
| Directors Guild of America Award | 0 | 2 |
| News & Documentary Emmy Awards | 10 | 25 |
| Peabody Awards | 14 | 14 |
| Primetime Emmy Awards | 12 | 43 |
| TCA Awards | 2 | 4 |
| Writers Guild of America Awards | 14 | 55 |

Totals (Note: Certain award groups do not simply award one winner. They acknowledge several different recipients, have runners-up, and have third place. Since this is a specific recognition and is different from losing an award, runner-up mentions are considered wins in this award tally. For simplification and to avoid errors, each award in this list has been presumed to have had a prior nomination.)
- Wins: 52
- Nominations: 150

American Experience is a television program airing on the Public Broadcasting Service (PBS) in the United States. The program airs documentaries about important or interesting events and people in American history. As of 2020 the show has aired 32 seasons and a total of 350 episodes. Throughout its run the show has received multiple awards and nominations, several episodes have won a Peabody Award and many have been nominated to awards given by guilds like the Directors Guild of America Awards and the Writers Guild of America Awards. Three episodes of the series have been nominated for Best Documentary Feature at the Academy Awards (D-Day Remembered in 1994, Troublesome Creek: A Midwestern and The Battle Over Citizen Kane in 1995). Also, the series received twelve Primetime Emmy Award out of over forty nominations, including Outstanding Documentary or Nonfiction Series twice in 1998 and 1999, being the inaugural winners of the category, Outstanding Documentary or Nonfiction Special for Scottsboro: An American Tragedy in 2001 and JFK in 2014 and Exceptional Merit in Documentary Filmmaking for Two Days in October in 2006 and Freedom Riders in 2011.

== Academy Awards ==
| Year | Category | Nominee(s) | Result | Ref |
|---|---|---|---|---|
| 1994 | Best Documentary Feature | D-Day Remembered | Nominated | |
| 1995 | Best Documentary Feature | Troublesome Creek: A Midwestern | Nominated | |
| 1995 | Best Documentary Feature | The Battle Over Citizen Kane | Nominated | |

== Cinema Audio Society Awards ==
| Year | Category | Nominee(s) | Result | Ref |
|---|---|---|---|---|
| 2003 | Outstanding Achievement in Sound Mixing for Television - Non-Fiction, Variety or Music Series or Specials | Dominick Tavella, Mark Mandler, John Zecca (for "New York: Center of the World") | Nominated | |
| 2004 | Outstanding Achievement in Sound Mixing for Television - Non-Fiction, Variety or Music Series or Specials | Roger Phenix, John Jenkins, Ken Hahn, Joe Hettinger (for "RFK") | Nominated | |
| 2011 | Outstanding Achievement in Sound Mixing for Television - Non-Fiction, Variety or Music Series or Specials | G. John Garrett, Rick Angelella, Everett Wong, Coll Anderson (for "Triangle Fire") | Nominated | |
| 2017 | Outstanding Achievement in Sound Mixing for Television - Non-Fiction, Variety or Music Series or Specials | John Jenkins, Ken Hahn (for "The Great War") | Nominated | |

== Directors Guild of America Awards ==
| Year | Category | Nominee(s) | Result | Ref |
|---|---|---|---|---|
| 1992 | Outstanding Directing – Documentaries | Ric Burns (for "The Donner Party") | Nominated | |
| 1996 | Outstanding Directing – Documentaries | Jeanne Jordan and Steven Ascher (for "Troublesome Creek: A Midwestern") | Nominated | |

== News & Documentary Emmy Awards ==
| Year | Category | Nominee(s) | Result | Ref |
|---|---|---|---|---|
| 1993 | Outstanding Individual Achievement in a Craft: Researchers | Robert Levi (for "Duke Ellington: Reminiscing in Tempo") | Won | |
| 2001 | Outstanding Individual Achievement in a Craft: Researchers | Dan T. Carter, Sandra Guardado, Daniel McCabe, Matthew R. McClung, Paul Stekler (for "George Wallace: Settin' the Woods on Fire") | Won | |
| 2001 | Outstanding Individual Achievement in a Craft: Writing | Steve Fayer, Daniel McCabe, Paul Stekler (for "George Wallace: Settin' the Woods on Fire") | Nominated | |
| 2002 | Outstanding Individual Achievement in a Craft: Writing | Chana Gazit (for "Fatal Food") | Nominated | |
| 2004 | Best Documentary | New York: Center of the World | Nominated | |
| 2004 | Outstanding Historical Programming - Long Form | New York: Center of the World | Won | |
| 2004 | Outstanding Science, Technology and Nature Programming | The Pill | Won | |
| 2004 | Outstanding Individual Achievement in a Craft: Music and Sound | Mariusz Glabinski, Marlena Grzaslewicz, Bruce Kitzmeyer, Ira Spiegel, Dominick Tavella (for "New York: Center of the World") | Nominated | |
| 2005 | Outstanding Individual Achievement in a Craft: Direction | Barak Goodman (for "The Fight") | Won | |
| 2005 | Outstanding Individual Achievement in a Craft: Writing | David Grubin (for "RFK") | Nominated | |
| 2006 | Outstanding Historical Programming - Long Form | Victory in the Pacific | Nominated | |
| 2006 | Outstanding Individual Achievement in a Craft: Writing | Austin Hoyt (for "Victory in the Pacific") | Nominated | |
| 2006 | Outstanding Individual Achievement in a Craft: Research | Karen Colbron, Rose M. Compagine, Pamela Gaudiano (for "Fidel Castro") | Nominated | |
| 2006 | Outstanding Individual Achievement in a Craft: Research | Karen Colbron, Margaret Johnson, Tamio Ota, Polly Pettit, Andrea Ryan, Reiko Sakuma, Kristina Wood, Midori Yanagihara (for "Victory in the Pacific") | Nominated | |
| 2007 | Outstanding Science, Technology and Nature Programming | The Boy in the Bubble | Nominated | |
| 2007 | Outstanding Individual Achievement in a Craft: Writing | Ric Burns, Arthur Gelb, Barbara Gelb (for "Eugene O'Neill: A Documentary Film") | Won | |
| 2007 | Outstanding Individual Achievement in a Craft: Lighting Direction & Scenic Design | Katha Seidman (for "John & Abigail Adams") | Won | |
| 2008 | Outstanding Individual Achievement in a Craft: Research | Rich Remsberg, John Rubin (for "The Living Weapon") | Won | |
| 2013 | Outstanding Historical Programming - Long Form | Jesse Owens | Nominated | |
| 2013 | Outstanding Research | Jesse Owens | Won | |
| 2013 | Outstanding Research | The Amish | Nominated | |
| 2013 | Outstanding Music and Sound | Tom Phillips, Brian Bracken, Leslie Bloome, Benny Mouthon (for "Jesse Owens") | Won | |
| 2015 | Outstanding Science and Technology Programming | The Poisoner's Handbook | Nominated | |
| 2016 | Outstanding Editing: Documentary and Long Form | Don Kleszy (for "Last Days in Vietnam") | Nominated | |
| 2017 | Outstanding Research | The Mine Wars | Nominated | |

== Peabody Award ==
| Year | Recipient | Result | Ref. |
|---|---|---|---|
| 1993 | The Donner Party | Won | |
| 1996 | Battle of the Bulge, FDR, Malcolm X: Make It Plain | Won | |
| 1997 | The Battle Over Citizen Kane | Won | |
| 1998 | The Presidents Series, Troublesome Creek: A Midwestern | Won | |
| 1999 | Riding the Rails, America 1900 | Won | |
| 2001 | Playing the China Card (Nixon's China Game) | Won | |
| 2002 | Monkey Trail | Won | |
| 2003 | The Murder of Emmett Till | Won | |
| 2004 | Tupperware! | Won | |
| 2005 | Two Days in October | Won | |
| 2010 | My Lai | Won | |
| 2011 | Triangle Fire, Freedom Riders, Stonewall Uprising | Won | |
| 2014 | Freedom Summer | Won | |
| 2017 | Oklahoma City | Won | |

== Primetime Emmy Awards ==
| Year | Category | Nominee(s) | Result | Ref |
|---|---|---|---|---|
| 1996 | Outstanding Informational Special | The Battle Over Citizen Kane | Nominated | |
| 1996 | Outstanding Achievement in Informational Programming | The Battle Over Citizen Kane | Nominated | |
| 1998 | Outstanding Non-Fiction Series | American Experience | Won | |
| 1999 | Outstanding Non-Fiction Series | American Experience | Won | |
| 2000 | Outstanding Non-Fiction Series | New York: A Documentary Film | Nominated | |
| 2000 | Outstanding Achievement in Informational Programming | New York: A Documentary Film | Won | |
| 2000 | Outstanding Cinematography for a Nonfiction Program | Allen Moore and Budyd Squires (for "New York: A Documentary Film") | Nominated | |
| 2001 | Outstanding Informational Special | Scottsboro: An American Tragedy | Won | |
| 2002 | Outstanding Cinematography for a Nonfiction Program | Michael Chin, Jon Else and Buddy Squires (for "Ansel Adams: A Documentary Film") | Nominated | |
| 2003 | Outstanding Directing for a Nonfiction Programming | Stanley Nelson Jr. (for "The Murder of Emmett Till") | Won | |
| 2003 | Outstanding Writing for a Nonfiction Programming | Michelle Ferrari (for "Seabiscuit") | Won | |
| 2003 | Outstanding Writing for a Nonfiction Programming | Marcia A. Smith (for "The Murder of Emmett Till") | Nominated | |
| 2003 | Outstanding Cinematography for a Nonfiction Program (Single or Multi-Camera) | Vicente Franco (for "Daughter from Danang") | Nominated | |
| 2003 | Outstanding Picture Editing for a Nonfiction Program (Single or Multi-Camera) | Toby Shimin (for "Seabiscuit") | Nominated | |
| 2003 | Outstanding Picture Editing for a Nonfiction Program (Single or Multi-Camera) | Kim Roberts (for "Daughter from Danang") | Nominated | |
| 2003 | Outstanding Sound Editing for a Nonfiction or Reality Program (Single or Multi-Camera) | Kevin Lee (for "Seabiscuit") | Nominated | |
| 2004 | Outstanding Directing for Nonfiction Programming | Laurie Kahn (for "Tupperware!") | Nominated | |
| 2005 | Exceptional Merit in Documentary Filmmaking | Guerrilla: The Taking of Patty Hearst | Nominated | |
| 2006 | Exceptional Merit in Documentary Filmmaking | Two Days in October | Won | |
| 2006 | Outstanding Sound Editing For Nonfiction Programming (Single Or Multi-Camera) | Jack Levy, Daniel Colman, Vince Balunas, Jeff K. Brunello, Kim Roberts, Doug Madick (for "Two Days in October") | Nominated | |
| 2007 | Exceptional Merit in Documentary Filmmaking | Jonestown: The Life and Death of Peoples Temple | Nominated | |
| 2008 | Exceptional Merit in Documentary Filmmaking | Oswald's Ghost | Nominated | |
| 2008 | Exceptional Merit in Documentary Filmmaking | Walt Whitman | Nominated | |
| 2008 | Outstanding Writing for a Nonfiction Programming | Mark Zwonitzer (for "Walt Whitman") | Nominated | |
| 2009 | Outstanding Non-Fiction Series | American Experience | Nominated | |
| 2009 | Outstanding Writing for a Nonfiction Programming | David Grubin (for "The Trials Of J. Robert Oppenheimer") | Nominated | |
| 2010 | Outstanding Non-Fiction Series | American Experience | Nominated | |
| 2010 | Exceptional Merit in Documentary Filmmaking | My Lai | Nominated | |
| 2010 | Outstanding Directing for a Documentary/Nonfiction Program | Barak Goodman (for "My Lai") | Won | |
| 2011 | Exceptional Merit in Documentary Filmmaking | Freedom Riders | Won | |
| 2011 | Outstanding Writing for a Nonfiction Programming | Stanley Nelson Jr. (for "Freedom Riders") | Won | |
| 2011 | Outstanding Picture Editing for a Nonfiction Program | Lewis Erskine and Aljernon Tunsil (for "Freedom Riders") | Won | |
| 2012 | Exceptional Merit in Documentary Filmmaking | The Amish | Nominated | |
| 2012 | Outstanding Writing for a Nonfiction Programming | Barak Goodman (for "Clinton") | Nominated | |
| 2013 | Outstanding Documentary or Nonfiction Special | Death and the Civil War | Nominated | |
| 2013 | Outstanding Documentary or Nonfiction Series | The Abolitionists | Nominated | |
| 2014 | Exceptional Merit in Documentary Filmmaking | The Amish: Shunned | Nominated | |
| 2014 | Outstanding Documentary or Nonfiction Special | JFK | Won | |
| 2014 | Outstanding Writing for a Nonfiction Programming | Mark Zwonitzer (for "JFK") | Nominated | |
| 2015 | Outstanding Writing for a Nonfiction Programming | Keven McAlester and Mark Bailey (for "Last Days in Vietnam") | Nominated | |
| 2016 | Outstanding Writing for a Nonfiction Programming | Mark Zwonitzer, Sarah Colt and Tom Jennings (for "Walt Disney") | Nominated | |
| 2017 | Exceptional Merit in Documentary Filmmaking | Oklahoma City | Nominated | |
| 2020 | Exceptional Merit in Documentary Filmmaking | Chasing the Moon | Nominated | |

== Television Critics Association Awards ==
| Year | Category | Nominee(s) | Result | Ref |
|---|---|---|---|---|
| 1997 | Outstanding Achievement in News and Information | American Experience | Won | |
| 1998 | Outstanding Achievement in News and Information | American Experience | Won | |
| 1999 | Outstanding Achievement in News and Information | American Experience | Nominated | |
| 2009 | Outstanding Achievement in News and Information | We Shall Remain | Nominated | |

== Writers Guild of America Awards ==
| Year | Category | Nominee(s) | Result | Ref |
|---|---|---|---|---|
| 1992 | Best Documentary Script – Other Than Current Events | David Grubin (for "LBJ") | Won | |
| 1992 | Best Documentary Script – Other Than Current Events | Robert Levi and Geoffrey C. Ward (for "Duke Ellington: Reminiscing in Tempo") | Nominated | |
| 1993 | Best Documentary Script – Other Than Current Events | Ric Burns (for "The Donner Party") | Won | |
| 1994 | Best Documentary Script – Other Than Current Events | Marty Ostrow (for "America and the Holocaust: Deceit and Indifference") | Won | |
| 1995 | Best Documentary Script – Other Than Current Events | Ric Burns (for "The Way West") | Won | |
| 1995 | Best Documentary Script – Other Than Current Events | David Grubin (for "FDR: Part 1") | Nominated | |
| 1995 | Best Documentary Script – Other Than Current Events | Thomas Lennon and Mark Zwonitzer (for "The Battle of the Bulge: World War II's Deadliest Battle") | Nominated | |
| 1996 | Best Documentary Script – Other Than Current Events | Chana Gazit (for "Chicago 1968") | Nominated | |
| 1996 | Best Documentary Script – Other Than Current Events | Thomas Lennon and Richard Ben Cramer (for "The Battle Over Citizen Kane") | Nominated | |
| 1997 | Best Documentary Script – Other Than Current Events | Elena Mannes and L. Franklin DeVine (for "New York Underground") | Nominated | |
| 1998 | Best Documentary Script – Other Than Current Events | David Grubin (for "Truman") | Won | |
| 1998 | Best Documentary Script – Other Than Current Events | Chana Gazit (for "Surviving the Dust Bowl") | Nominated | |
| 1998 | Best Documentary Script – Other Than Current Events | Adriana Bosch (for "Reagan: Part 2") | Nominated | |
| 1999 | Best Documentary Script – Other Than Current Events | Stephen Stept (for "Hoover Dam") | Won | |
| 1999 | Best Documentary Script – Other Than Current Events | Chana Gazit (for "Meltdown at Three Mile Island") | Nominated | |
| 2001 | Best Documentary Script – Other Than Current Events | Barak Goodman (for "Scottsboro: An American Tragedy") | Won | |
| 2001 | Best Documentary Script – Other Than Current Events | Ken Emerson & Randy MacLowry (for "Steven Foster") | Nominated | |
| 2002 | Best Documentary Script – Other Than Current Events | Christine Lesiak (for "Monkey Trail") | Won | |
| 2003 | Best Documentary Script – Other Than Current Events | Marcia Smith (for "The Murder of Emmett Till") | Won | |
| 2003 | Best Documentary Script – Other Than Current Events | Michelle Ferrari (for "Seabiscuit") | Nominated | |
| 2004 | Best Documentary Script – Other Than Current Events | Barak Goodman (for "The Fight") | Won | |
| 2004 | Best Documentary Script – Other Than Current Events | Mel Bucklin (for "Emma Goldman") | Nominated | |
| 2004 | Best Documentary Script – Other Than Current Events | David Grubin (for "RFK") | Nominated | |
| 2004 | Best Documentary Script – Other Than Current Events | Llewellyn M. Smith and Elizabeth Deane (for "Reconstruction") | Nominated | |
| 2005 | Best Documentary Script – Other Than Current Events | Adriana Bosch (for "Fidel Castro") | Nominated | |
| 2005 | Best Documentary Script – Other Than Current Events | Barak Goodman (for "Kinsey") | Nominated | |
| 2005 | Best Documentary Script – Other Than Current Events | Mark Zwonitzer (for "The Massie Affair") | Nominated | |
| 2006 | Best Documentary Script – Other Than Current Events | Arthur Gelb, Barbara Gelb and Ric Burns (for "Eugene O'Neill: A Documentary Film") | Nominated | |
| 2006 | Best Documentary Script – Other Than Current Events | Elizabeth Deane (for "John and Abigail Adams") | Nominated | |
| 2006 | Best Documentary Script – Other Than Current Events | Mark Davis (for "The Alaska Pipeline") | Nominated | |
| 2006 | Best Documentary Script – Other Than Current Events | Barak Goodman (for "The Boy in the Bubble") | Nominated | |
| 2007 | Best Documentary Script – Other Than Current Events | Ronald Blumer (for "Alexander Hamilton") | Nominated | |
| 2008 | Best Documentary Script – Other Than Current Events | Michelle Ferrari (for "Kit Carson") | Nominated | |
| 2009 | Best Documentary Script – Other Than Current Events | David Grubin (for "The Trials of J. Robert Oppenheimer") | Won | |
| 2009 | Best Documentary Script – Other Than Current Events | Barak Goodman (for "The Assassination of Abraham Lincoln") | Nominated | |
| 2009 | Best Documentary Script – Other Than Current Events | Mark Zwonitzer (for "We Shall Remain: Episode Three: Trail of Tears") | Nominated | |
| 2009 | Best Documentary Script – Other Than Current Events | Ric Burns (for "We Shall Remain: Episode Two: Tecumseh's Vision") | Nominated | |
| 2010 | Best Documentary Script – Other Than Current Events | Ronald H. Blumer (for "Dolley Madison") | Nominated | |
| 2011 | Best Documentary Script – Other Than Current Events | Mark Davis (for "Dinosaur Bone War") | Nominated | |
| 2011 | Best Documentary Script – Other Than Current Events | Stanley Nelson (for "Freedom Riders") | Nominated | |
| 2011 | Best Documentary Script – Other Than Current Events | Austin Hoyt (for "The Great Famine") | Nominated | |
| 2011 | Best Documentary Script – Other Than Current Events | Mark Zwonitzer (for "Triangle Fire") | Nominated | |
| 2012 | Best Documentary Script – Other Than Current Events | David Belton (for "The Amish") | Nominated | |
| 2012 | Best Documentary Script – Other Than Current Events | Barak Goodman (for "Clinton") | Nominated | |
| 2012 | Best Documentary Script – Other Than Current Events | Ric Burns (for "Death and the Civil War") | Nominated | |
| 2013 | Best Documentary Script – Other Than Current Events | Randall MacLowry and Michelle Ferrari (for "Silicon Valley") | Won | |
| 2013 | Best Documentary Script – Other Than Current Events | Rob Rapley (for "The Abolitionists") | Nominated | |
| 2015 | Best Documentary Script – Other Than Current Events | Chana Gazit (for "The Forgotten Plague") | Nominated | |
| 2017 | Best Documentary Script – Other Than Current Events | Stephen Ives (for "The Great War: Part II") | Won | |
| 2017 | Best Documentary Script – Other Than Current Events | Michelle Ferrari (for "Rachel Carson") | Nominated | |
| 2017 | Best Documentary Script – Other Than Current Events | Rob Rapley (for "The Great War: Part III") | Nominated | |
| 2018 | Best Documentary Script – Other Than Current Events | Michelle Ferrari (for "The Eugenics Crusade") | Won | |
| 2018 | Best Documentary Script – Other Than Current Events | Sharon Grimberg (for "The Circus: Part One") | Nominated | |
| 2018 | Best Documentary Script – Other Than Current Events | John Maggio (for "Into the Amazon") | Nominated | |
| 2019 | Best Documentary Script – Other Than Current Events | Robert Stone (for "Chasing The Moon Part One: A Place Beyond The Sky") | Nominated | |
| 2020 | Best Documentary Script – Other Than Current Events | John Maggio (for "The Poison Squad") | Nominated | |
