= Writers Guild of America Award for Television: Documentary Script – Other Than Current Events =

Annual award

- Awarded for: Outstanding Writing in Documentaries – Other Than Current Events
- Country: United States
- Presented by: Writers Guild of America
- First award: 1987
- Currently held by: Gene Tempest for "Citizen Hearst, Part One" (American Experience) - 2021
- Website: www.wga.org

The Writers Guild of America Award for Television: Documentary Script – Other Than Current Events is an award presented by the Writers Guild of America to the best writing in a documentary about topics other than current events. It was first awarded at the 40th Writers Guild of America Awards, being the program The Grizzlies the inaugural winner of the category.

== Winners and nominees ==
=== 1980s ===
| Year | Program | Episode | Writer(s) | Network | Ref. |
|---|---|---|---|---|---|
| 1987 (40th) | The Grizzlies | | Theodore Thomas | PBS | |
| 1988 (41st) | George Stevens: A Filmmaker's Journey | | George Stevens Jr. | ABC | |
| 1989 (42nd) | American Experience | "Mr. Sears' Catalogue" | Edward Gray and Mark Obenhaus | PBS | |

=== 1990s ===
| Year | Program | Episode | Writer(s) | Network | Ref. |
|---|---|---|---|---|---|
| 1990 (43rd) | No award given | | | | |
| 1991 (44th) | No award given | | | | |
| 1992 (45th) | American Experience | "LBJ" | David Grubin | PBS | |
| 1992 (45th) | American Experience | "Duke Ellington: Reminiscing in Tempo" | Robert Levi and Geoffrey C. Ward | PBS | |
| 1993 (46th) | Degenerate Art | | David Grubin | PBS | |
| 1993 (46th) | American Experience | "The Donner Party" | Ric Burns | PBS | |
| 1993 (46th) | Orson Welles: What Went Wrong? | | Robert Guenette | Cinemax | |
| 1993 (46th) | The Pacific Century | "Inside Japan Inc." | Carl Byker, Alex Gibney, and Andrea Malin | PBS | |
| 1993 (46th) | The Pacific Century | "The Fight for Democracy" | Carl Byker | PBS | |
| 1993 (46th) | 48 Hours | "The Smallest Survivors" | Thomas F. Flynn | CBS | |
| 1993 (46th) | 48 Hours | "The End of Innocence" | Greg Kandra | CBS | |
| 1994 (47th) | American Experience | "America and the Holocaust: Deceit and Indifference" | Marty Ostrow | PBS | |
| 1995 (48th) | American Experience | "The Way West" | Ric Burns | PBS | |
| 1995 (48th) | Frederick Douglas: When the Lion Wrote History | | Steve Fayer and Theodore Thomas | PBS | |
| 1995 (48th) | American Experience | "FDR: Part 1" | David Grubin | PBS | |
| 1995 (48th) | American Experience | "The Battle of the Bulge: World War II's Deadliest Battle" | Thomas Lennon and Mark Zwonitzer | PBS | |
| 1996 (49th) | Paving the Way | | Susan Kim | PBS | |
| 1996 (49th) | Idols of the Game | "Inventing the All-American" | Robert Lipsyte | TBS | |
| 1996 (49th) | American Experience | "The Battle Over Citizen Kane" | Thomas Lennon and Richard Ben Cramer | PBS | |
| 1996 (49th) | American Experience | "Chicago 1968" | Chana Gazit | PBS | |
| 1996 (49th) | American Masters | "Rod Serling: Submitted for Your Approval" | John F. Goff and Thomas Wagner | PBS | |
| 1996 (49th) | Frontline | "Angel on Death Row" | Ben Loeterman | PBS | |
| 1997 (50th) | Investigative Reports | "The Secret White House Tapes" | Carol L. Fleisher and William Doyle | A&E | |
| 1997 (50th) | American Experience | "New York Underground" | Elena Mannes and L. Franklin DeVine | PBS | |
| 1997 (50th) | The West | "One Sky Above Us" | Geoffrey C. Ward and Dayton Duncan | PBS | |
| 1997 (50th) | The Real Las Vegas | "Las Vegas: Gamble in the Desert" | Susan Berman, Jim Milio, Melissa Jo Peltier and Paul S. Kaufman | A&E | |
| 1998 (51st) | American Experience | "Truman" | David Grubin | PBS | |
| 1998 (51st) | Lusitania | "Murder on the Atlantic" | Kelly McPherson and Melissa Jo Peltier | | |
| 1998 (51st) | American Experience | "Reagan: Part I" | Adriana Bosch | PBS | |
| 1998 (51st) | American Experience | "Surviving the Dust Bowl" | Chana Gazit | PBS | |
| 1998 (51st) | A Science Odyssey | "In Search of Ourselves" | Alice Markowitz | PBS | |
| 1998 (51st) | Sea Tales | "The Doomed Voyage of the St. Louis" | Christopher Meindl and Melissa Jo Peltier | PBS | |
| 1998 (51st) | The Irish in America: Long Journey Home | "Long Journey Home" | Thomas N. Brown and Thomas Lennon | PBS | |
| 1999 (52nd) | American Experience | "Hoover Dam" | Stephen Stept | PBS | |
| 1999 (52nd) | American Experience | "Meltdown at Three Mile Island" | Chana Gazit | PBS | |
| 1999 (52nd) | Nova | "Lost at Sea - The Search for Longitude" | | PBS | |
| 1999 (52nd) | Founding Fathers | | Melissa Jo Peltier and Max M. Fletcher | History Channel | |
| 1999 (52nd) | Margaret Sanger | | Bruce Alfred and Michelle Ferrari | | |
| 1999 (52nd) | War Dogs: America's Forgotten Heroes | | Tim Prokop | Discovery Channel | |

=== 2000s ===
| Year | Program | Episode | Writer(s) | Network | Ref. |
|---|---|---|---|---|---|
| 2000 (53rd) | American Experience | "George Wallace: Settin' the Woods on Fire" | Steve Fayer and Daniel McCabe and Paul Stekler | PBS | |
| 2000 (53rd) | Without Lying Down: Frances Marion and the Power of Women in Hollywood | | Bridget Terry and Cari Beauchamp | TMC | |
| 2000 (53rd) | Frontline | "Apocalypse!" | William Cran and Ben Loeterman | PBS | |
| 2000 (53rd) | Culture Shock | "Born to Trouble: Adventures of Huckleberry Finn" | Jill Janows and Leslie Lee | PBS | |
| 2000 (53rd) | American Masters | "Hitchcock, Selznick & the End of Hollywood" | Michael Epstein | PBS | |
| 2001 (54th) | American Experience | "Scottsboro: An American Tragedy" | Barak Goodman | PBS | |
| 2001 (54th) | Nova | "Hitler's Lost Sub" | Rushmore DeNooyer | PBS | |
| 2001 (54th) | American Experience | "Stephen Foster" | Ken Emerson and Randy MacLowry | PBS | |
| 2001 (54th) | American Masters | "Finding Lucy" | Thomas Wagner | PBS | |
| 2001 (54th) | Frontline | "Medicating Kidgs" | Martin Smith | PBS | |
| 2001 (54th) | Jazz | "Dedicated to Class" | Geoffrey C. Ward | PBS | |
| 2002 (55th) | American Experience | "Monkey Trial" | Christine Lesiak | PBS | |
| 2002 (55th) | A Day in their Lives | "Empire State Building Ironworker" | Peter Hankoff | History Channel | |
| 2002 (55th) | Founding Fathers | "Evolution of a Revolution" | Kelly McPherson, Melissa Jo Peltier and Allison MacEwan | History Channel | |
| 2002 (55th) | America's First River | "Part One" | Tom Spain | PBS | |
| 2003 (56th) | American Experience | "The Murder of Emmett Till" | Marcia Smith | PBS | |
| 2003 (56th) | Nova: The Elegant Universe | "Welcome To the 11th Dimension" | Julia Cort and Joseph McMaster | PBS | |
| 2003 (56th) | Nova: The Elegant Universe | "The String's the Thing" | Joseph McMaster | PBS | |
| 2003 (56th) | American Experience | "Seabiscuit" | Michelle Ferrari | PBS | |
| 2003 (56th) | Becoming American: The Chinese Experience | "Part II" | Thomas Lennon, Mi Ling Tsui and Bill Moyers | PBS | |
| 2003 (56th) | Frontline | "Cyber War!" | Michael Kirk | PBS | |
| 2004 (57th) | American Experience | "The Fight" | Barak Goodman | PBS | |
| 2004 (57th) | Broadway: The American Musical | "Oh, What a Beautiful Morning" | JoAnn Young | PBS | |
| 2004 (57th) | American Experience | "Reconstruction" | Llewellyn M. Smith and Elizabeth Deane | PBS | |
| 2004 (57th) | American Experience | "RFK" | David Grubin | PBS | |
| 2004 (57th) | American Experience | "Emma Goldman" | Mel Bucklin | PBS | |
| 2004 (57th) | They Made America | "Revolutionaries" | Carl Charlson and Harold Evans | PBS | |
| 2005 (58th) | Unforgivable Blackness: The Rise and Fall of Jack Johnson | | Geoffrey C. Ward | PBS | |
| 2005 (58th) | Shot from the Sky | | Tim Prokop | A&E | |
| 2005 (58th) | American Experience | "Kinsey" | Barak Goodman | PBS | |
| 2005 (58th) | American Experience | "The Massie Affair" | Mark Zwonitzer | PBS | |
| 2005 (58th) | American Experience | "Fidel Castro" | Adriana Bosch | PBS | |
| 2006 (59th) | Marie Antoinette | | David Grubin | PBS | |
| 2006 (59th) | American Experience | "The Boy in the Bubble" | Barak Goodman | PBS | |
| 2006 (59th) | American Experience | "The Alaska Pipeline" | Mark Davis | PBS | |
| 2006 (59th) | American Experience | "John & Abigail Adams" | Elizabeth Deane | PBS | |
| 2006 (59th) | American Experience | "Eugene O'Neill: A Documentary Film" | Arthur Gelb, Barbara Gelb and Ric Burns | PBS | |
| 2007 (60th) | Independent Lens | "Billy Strayhorn: Lush Life" | Robert Levi and Robert Seidman | PBS | |
| 2007 (60th) | Nova | "Forgotten Genius" | Stephen Lyons and Llewellyn M. Smith | PBS | |
| 2007 (60th) | American Experience | "Alexander Hamilton" | Ronald Blumer | PBS | |
| 2007 (60th) | The War | "Episode Four: Pride of Our Nation" | Geoffrey C. Ward | PBS | |
| 2008 (61st) | Nova | "Secrets of the Parthenon" | Gary Glassman | PBS | |
| 2008 (61st) | Andrew Jackson: Good, Evil, and the Presidency | | Carl Byker | PBS | |
| 2008 (61st) | American Experience | "Kit Carson" | Michelle Ferrari | PBS | |
| 2008 (61st) | The Truth about Cancer | | Linda Garmon | PBS | |
| 2008 (61st) | The Jewish Americans | "The Best of Times, The Worst of Times (1924-1945)" | David Grubin | PBS | |
| 2009 (62nd) | American Experience | "The Trials of J. Robert Oppenheimer" | Marcela Gaviria and Martin Smith | PBS | |
| 2009 (62nd) | Soul of a People: Writing America's Story | | David A. Taylor, Olive Emma Bucklin and Andrea Kalin | Smithsonian Channel | |
| 2009 (62nd) | American Experience | "The Assassination of Abraham Lincoln" | Barak Goodman | PBS | |
| 2009 (62nd) | American Experience | "We Shall Remain: Trail of Tears" | Mark Zwonitzer | PBS | |
| 2009 (62nd) | American Experience | "We Shall Remain: Tecumseh's Vision" | Ric Burns | PBS | |
| 2009 (62nd) | The National Parks: America's Best Idea | | Dayton Duncan | PBS | |

=== 2010s ===
| Year | Program | Episode | Writer(s) | Network | Ref. |
|---|---|---|---|---|---|
| 2010 (63rd) | American Experience | "Wyatt Earp" | Ron Rapley | PBS | |
| 2010 (63rd) | Baseball: The Tenth Inning | "Episode 1" | David McMahon, Lynn Novick and Ken Burns | PBS | |
| 2010 (63rd) | American Experience | "Dolley Madison" | Ronald H. Blumer | PBS | |
| 2010 (63rd) | Nova | "Hubble's Amazing Rescue" | Rushmore DeNooyer | PBS | |
| 2010 (63rd) | Nova | "Riddles of the Sphinx" | Gary Glassman | PBS | |
| 2010 (63rd) | Bill Moyers Journal | "LBJ's Path to War" | Bill Moyers and Michael Winship | PBS | |
| 2011 (64th) | Frontline | "Wiki Secrets" | Marcela Gaviria and Martin Smith | PBS | |
| 2011 (64th) | American Experience | "Triangle Fire" | Mark Zwonitzer | PBS | |
| 2011 (64th) | American Experience | “Dinosaur Bone War” | Mark Davis | PBS | |
| 2011 (64th) | American Experience | “The Great Famine” | Austin Hoyt | PBS | |
| 2011 (64th) | Nova | “Making Stuff Smarter” | Daniel McCabe | PBS | |
| 2011 (64th) | God in America | “A New Adam, a New Eden” | David Belton | PBS | |
| 2011 (64th) | Prohibition | "A Nation of Scofflaws" | Geoffrey C. Ward | PBS | |
| 2012 (65th) | Nova | "The Fabric of the Cosmos: The Illusion of Time" | Randall MacLowry, Joseph McMaster and Randall MacLowry | PBS | |
| 2012 (65th) | American Experience | "The Amish" | David Belton | PBS | |
| 2012 (65th) | American Experience | "Clinton" | Barak Goodman | PBS | |
| 2012 (65th) | American Experience | "Death and the Civil War" | Ric Burns | PBS | |
| 2012 (65th) | Nova | "The Fabric of the Cosmos: Quantum Leap" | Josh Rosen, Julia Cort and Joseph McMaster | PBS | |
| 2012 (65th) | American Masters | "Johnny Carson: King of Late Night" | Peter T. Jones | PBS | |
| 2013 (66th) | American Experience | "Silicon Valley" | Randall MacLowry and Michelle Ferrari | PBS | |
| 2013 (66th) | Frontline | "The Choice 2012" | Michael Kirk | PBS | |
| 2013 (66th) | American Experience | "The Abolitionists" | Rob Rapley | PBS | |
| 2013 (66th) | The Dust Bowl | "The Great Plow-Up"" | Dayton Duncan | PBS | |
| 2014 (67th) | Frontline | "League of Denial: The NFL's Concussion Crisis" | Michael Kirk and Mike Wiser | PBS | |
| 2014 (67th) | Cosmos: A Spacetime Odyssey | "Standing Up in the Milky Way" | Ann Druyan and Steven Soter | Fox | |
| 2014 (67th) | The Roosevelts: An Intimate History | "The Rising Road (1933–1939)" | Geoffrey C. Ward | PBS | |
| 2015 (68th) | Nova | "The Great Math Mystery" | Daniel McCab | PBS | |
| 2015 (68th) | Frontline | "Firestone and the Warlord" | Marcela Gaviria | PBS | |
| 2015 (68th) | Frontline | "Secrets, Politics and Torture" | Michael Kirk and Mike Wiser | PBS | |
| 2015 (68th) | American Experience | "The Forgotten Plague" | Chana Gazit | PBS | |
| 2016 (69th) | Jackie Robinson | "Part One" | David McMahon and Sarah Burns | PBS | |
| 2016 (69th) | American Reds | | Richard Wormser | WPTS Dayton | |
| 2016 (69th) | Frontline | "Netanyahu at War" | Michael Kirk and Mike Wiser | PBS | |
| 2017 (70th) | American Experience | "The Vietnam War: Episode 2" | Stephen Ives | PBS | |
| 2017 (70th) | Frontline | "Divided States of America: Part One" | Michael Kirk and Mike Wiser | PBS | |
| 2017 (70th) | American Experience | "The Vietnam War: Episode 6" | Geoffrey C. Ward | PBS | |
| 2017 (70th) | American Experience | "Rachel Carson" | Michelle Ferrari | PBS | |
| 2017 (70th) | American Experience | "The Great War: Part III" | Rob Rapley | PBS | |
| 2018 (71st) | American Experience | "The Eugenics Crusade" | Michelle Ferrari | PBS | |
| 2018 (71st) | Frontline | "Bitter Rivals: Iran and Saudi Arabia – Part 1" | David Fanning, Linda Hirsch and Martin Smith | PBS | |
| 2018 (71st) | American Experience | "The Circus, Part One" | Sharon Grimberg | PBS | |
| 2018 (71st) | American Experience | "Into the Amazon" | John Maggio | PBS | |
| 2019 (72nd) | American Experience | "Chasing The Moon Part One: A Place Beyond The Sky" | Robert Stone | PBS | |
| 2019 (72nd) | Frontline | "Right to Fail" | Tom Jennings | PBS | |
| 2019 (72nd) | Frontline | "Supreme Revenge" | Michael Kirk and Mike Wiser | PBS | |

=== 2020s ===
| Year | Program | Episode | Writer(s) | Network | Ref. |
|---|---|---|---|---|---|
| 2020 (73rd) | Frontline | "Opioids, Inc." | Tom Jennings | PBS | |
| 2020 (73rd) | American Experience | "The Poison Squad" | John Maggio | PBS | |
| 2020 (73rd) | Nova | "The Violence Paradox" | Michael Bicks and Anna Lee Strachan | PBS | |
| 2021 (74th) | American Experience | "Citizen Hearst, Part One" | Gene Tempest | PBS | |
| 2021 (74th) | Amend: The Fight for America | "Citizen" | Sasha Stewart and Robe Imbriano | Netflix | |
| 2021 (74th) | Hemingway | "A Writer" | Geoffrey C. Ward | PBS | |
| 2021 (74th) | Muhammad Ali | "Round One" | David McMahon and Sarah Burns | PBS | |

== Programs with multiple wins ==
18 awards

- American Experience (PBS)

4 awards

- Nova (PBS)
- Frontline (PBS)

== Programs with multiple nominations ==
59 nominations

- American Experience (PBS)

15 nominations

- Frontline (PBS)

13 nominations

- Nova (PBS)

4 nominations

- American Masters (PBS)

2 nominations

- Founding Fathers (History Channel)

== See also ==
- Primetime Emmy Award for Outstanding Writing for a Nonfiction Programming
