= American Experience season 9 =

American Experience
- Season 9
- No. of episodes: 20

Release
- Original network: PBS
- Original release: October 6, 1996 – July 28, 1997

Season chronology
- ← Previous; Season 8 Next → Season 10

Season nine of the television program American Experience originally aired on the PBS network in the United States on October 6, 1996 and concluded on July 28, 1997. This is the ninth season to feature David McCullough as the host. The season contained 20 new episodes and began with the first part of the film TR, The Story of Theodore Roosevelt. The 11-part Vietnam: A Television History miniseries was a rebroadcast of the production originally shown in 1983. Episode two "The First Vietnam War" and episode 13 "Legacies" were dropped from the 1997 rebroadcast. Episode 12 "The End of the Tunnel (1973–1975)" was rebroadcast as "The Fall of Saigon" for the 1997 airing.

== Episodes ==
* Denotes multiple chapters that aired on the same date and share the same episode number

No. overall	No. in season	Title	Directed by	Categories	Original release date
93	1	"TR, The Story of Theodore Roosevelt (Part 1)"	David Grubin	Biographies, Politics, Presidents	October 6, 1996
94	2	"TR, The Story of Theodore Roosevelt (Part 2)"	David Grubin	Biographies, Politics, Presidents	October 7, 1996
95	3	"The Richest Man in the World: Andrew Carnegie"	Austin Hoyt	Biographies	January 20, 1997
96	4	"Hawaii's Last Queen"	Vivian Ducat	Biographies	January 27, 1997
97	5	"The Telephone"	Karen Goodman & Kirk Simon	Technology	February 3, 1997
98	6	"Big Dream, Small Screen"	David Dugan	Technology	February 10, 1997
99	7	"New York Underground"	Elena Mannes	Technology	February 17, 1997
100	8	"Troublesome Creek: A Midwestern"	Steven Ascher & Jeanne Jordan	Biographies, Technology, The Natural Environment	April 14, 1997
101	9	"Around the World in 72 Days"	Christine Lesiak	Biographies, Popular Culture	April 28, 1997
102	10	"Gold Fever"	Susan Steinberg	The American West	May 12, 1997
103	11*	"Vietnam: A Television History (Parts 1–2)"	Judith Vecchione (Part 1); Elizabeth Deane (Part 2)	Politics, War	May 26, 1997
Part 1: "Roots of a War (1945–1953)"; Part 2: "America's Mandarin (1954–1963)"
104	12	"Vietnam: A Television History (Part 3)"	Austin Hoyt	Politics, War	June 2, 1997
Part 3: "LBJ Goes to War (1964–1965)"
105	13	"Vietnam: A Television History (Part 4)"	Andrew Pearson	Politics, War	June 9, 1997
Part 4: "America Takes Charge (1965–1967)"
106	14	"Vietnam: A Television History (Part 5)"	Martin Smith	Politics, War	June 16, 1997
Part 5: "America's Enemy (1954–1967)"
107	15	"Vietnam: A Television History (Part 6)"	Austin Hoyt	Politics, War	June 23, 1997
Part 6: "Tet 1968"
108	16	"Vietnam: A Television History (Part 7)"	Martin Smith	Politics, War	June 30, 1997
Part 7: "Vietnamizing the War (1968–1973)"
109	17	"Vietnam: A Television History (Part 8)"	Bruce Palling	Politics, War	July 7, 1997
Part 8: "Cambodia and Laos"
110	18	"Vietnam: A Television History (Part 9)"	Martin Smith	Politics, War	July 14, 1997
Part 9: "Peace is at Hand (1968–1973)"
111	19	"Vietnam: A Television History (Part 10)"	Elizabeth Deane	Politics, War	July 21, 1997
Part 10: "Homefront USA"
112	20	"Vietnam: A Television History (Part 11)"	Elizabeth Deane	Politics, War	July 28, 1997
Part 11: "The Fall of Saigon"
