= Michael Bacon (composer) =

American film composer (born 1949)

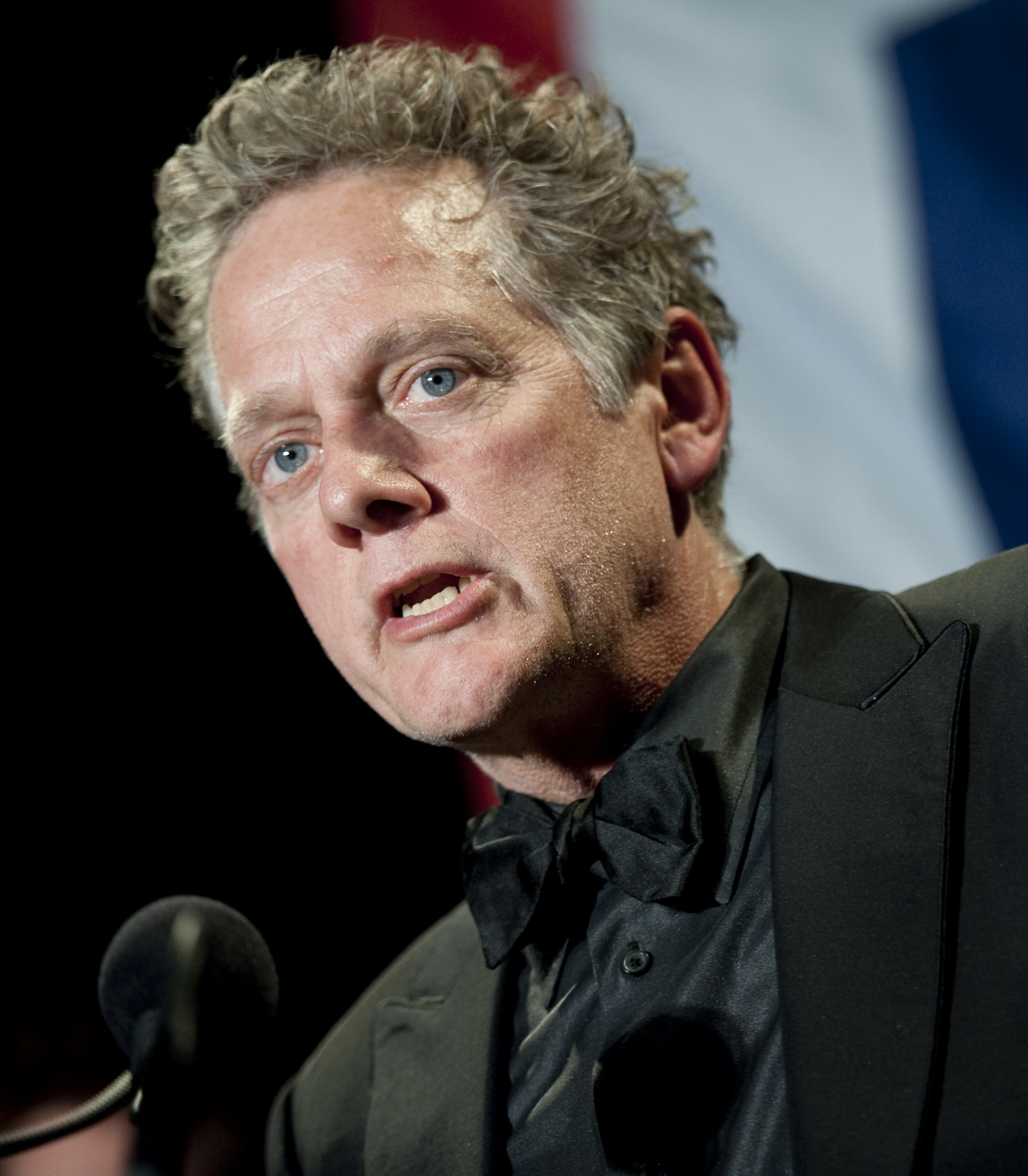
- Bacon in April 2010
- Born: December 22, 1949 (age 76); Philadelphia, Pennsylvania, U.S.
- Occupations: Composer, musician
- Spouse: Betsy Maguire (m. 1972)
- Parent(s): Edmund Bacon; Ruth Bacon (née Holmes)
- Relatives: Kevin Bacon (brother); Kyra Sedgwick (sister-in-law); Sosie Bacon (niece)
- Musical career
- Genres: Country, rock, folk, soul, film score
- Instruments: Vocals, guitar, keyboards, cello, banjo, drums, violin
- Member of: The Bacon Brothers
- Website: michaelbaconmusic.com

Michael Comly Bacon (born December 22, 1949) is an American musician and film score composer. He is the older brother of actor Kevin Bacon. He is a faculty member in music at Lehman College.

== Early life and education ==
Bacon, one of six children, was born in Philadelphia. He grew up in a close-knit family who resided at 2117 Locust Street in Philadelphia. His mother, Ruth Hilda (née Holmes), was a former Park Avenue debutante, elementary school teacher, and liberal activist. His father, Edmund Bacon, was a respected urban planner and author of the canonical urban planning book, Design of Cities. Michael attended Central High School in Philadelphia, where he graduated 224th in his class in June 1965. Years later, he entered Lehman College and graduated in 1995.

== Career ==
=== Music ===
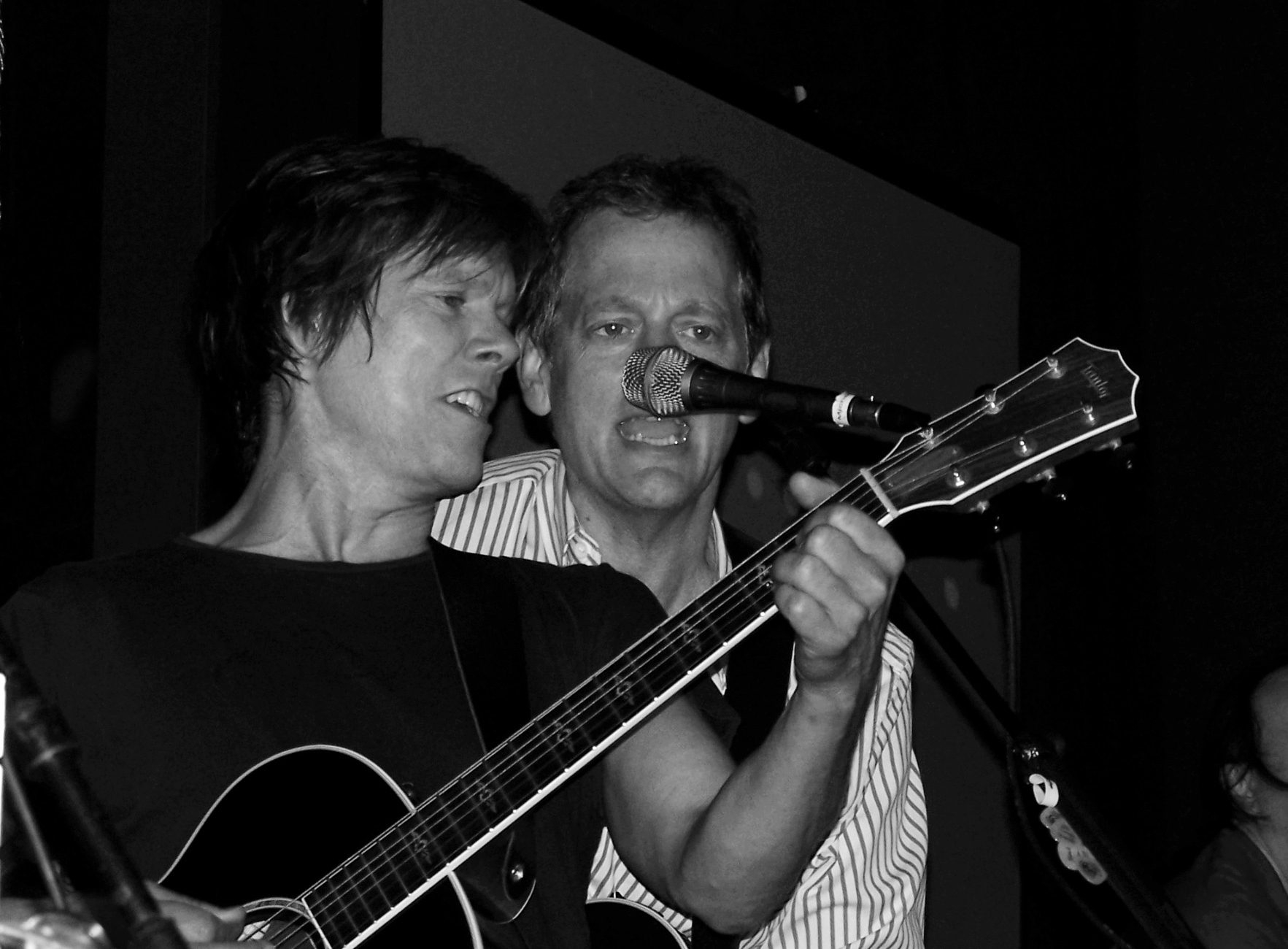
The Bacon Brothers, Michael (right) and Kevin Bacon in New York City

Bacon is an accomplished guitarist, keyboardist and cellist. In the late 1990s and into the 2000s, Bacon performed with his Golden Globe and Screen Actors Guild Award-winning brother, Kevin, in a duo ensemble, called The Bacon Brothers, which he formed. With three albums to their credit by 2001, Bacon's tour schedule included eight concerts for the summer of that year, at venues from New York City, down the East Coast, and into the Midwest to Peru, Illinois and Missouri. The duo have written and performed songs together for several decades, including several commercial numbers. The Bacon Brothers were featured on the July–August 2006 cover of Making Music Magazine.

=== Film and television ===
In January 2006, Bacon appeared on an episode of Queer Eye with his brother Kevin. The episode featured him as the episode's "straight guy" and makeover recipient, and ended with both Bacon Brothers performing.

Bacon has composed hundreds of songs for television shows and motion pictures. In 2008, Bacon composed the soundtrack for the PBS mini series The Jewish Americans.

=== Academia ===
Bacon earned his BS from Lehman College in 1995. From 2010 to 2016 he served as Distinguished Lecturer and currently is an Associate Professor of Music.

== Personal life ==
Bacon has been married to Betsy Maguire-Bacon since 1972 and they have one child. Bacon earned a degree in music from Lehman College, studying composition and orchestration with Pulitzer Prize-winning composer John Corigliano.

== Discography ==
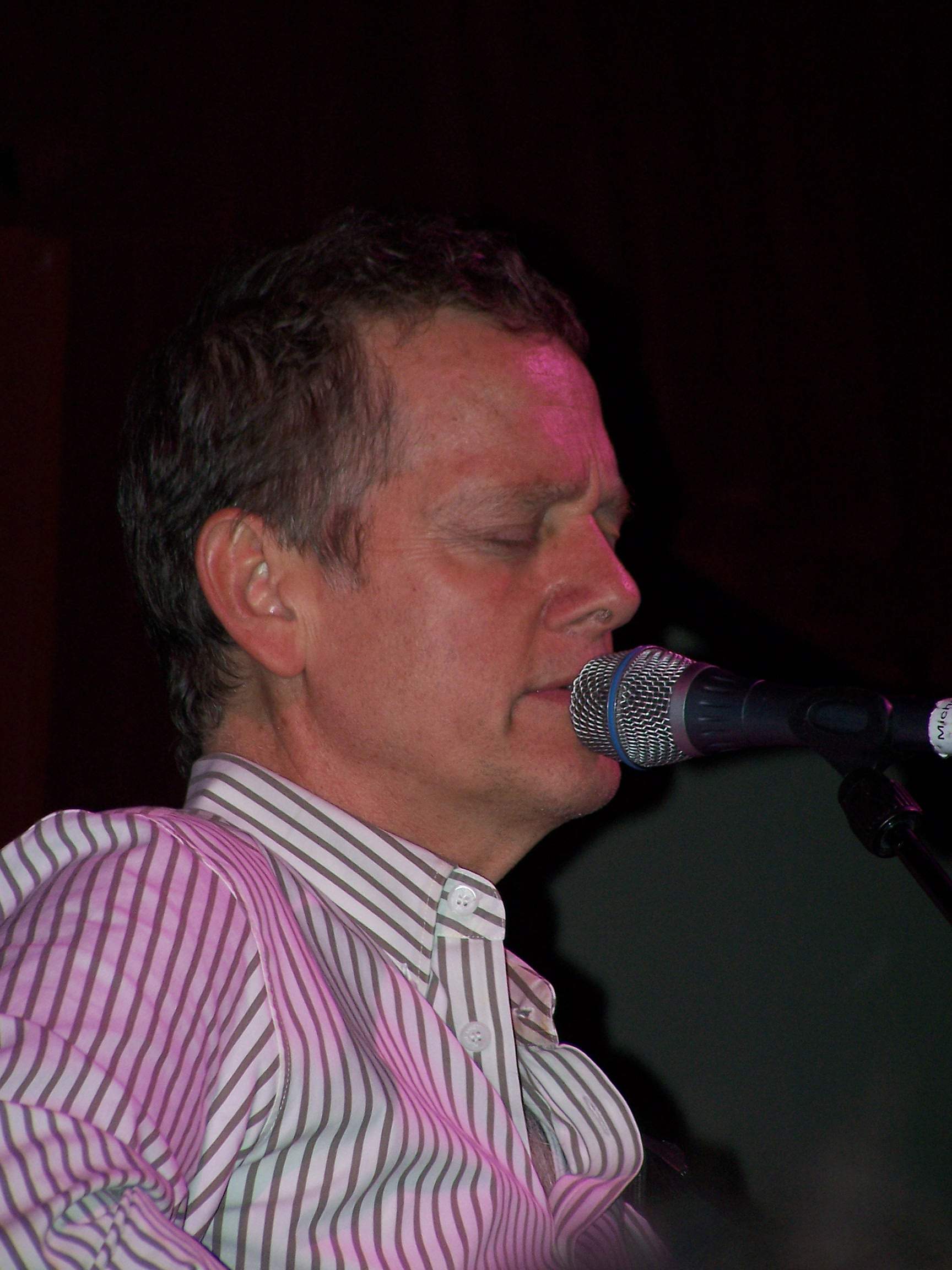
Bacon at a concert of the Bacon Brothers in 2006

=== Solo ===
“Good News" Columbia

“Bringin’ it Home" Monument/CBS

“Love Song Believer" Monument/

=== With Kevin Bacon as the Bacon Brothers ===
- 1997: Forosoco
- 1999: Getting There
- 2001: Can't Complain
- 2005: White Knuckles
- 2009: New Years Day
- 2011: Philadelphia Road – The Best Of
- 2014: 36¢
- 2018: The Bacon Brothers
- 2020: The Way We Love

=== Film and television scores ===
- Film
  - The Man Nobody Knew -feature dir. by Carl Colby
  - Boy Interrupted 2009 Sundance -dir. by Dana Perry
  - Red Betsy (with Sheldon Mirowitz) -feature dir. Chris Boebel
  - Loverboy -feature dir. By Kevin Bacon
  - Brothers in Arms – The Story of the Crew of Patrol Craft 94 feature doc. with John Kerry
  - Berga: Soldiers of Another War -Guggenheim Prods.
  - King Gimp −2000 Acad. Award Winner Short Documentary Bill Whiteford and Susan Hadary
  - D-Day Remembered 1995 Acad. Award Nominee Long Documentary Guggenheim Prods.
  - A Time for Justice 1995 Acad. Award Winner- Short Documentary- Guggenheim Prods.
  - Losing Chase starring Helen Mirren (Golden Globe winner) and Kyra Sedgwick dir. Kevin Bacon.
  - A Place in the Land 1998 Acad. Award Nominee Short Documentary Guggenheim Prods.
  - The Last Good Time dir. Bob Balaban
  - Sleeping Together dir. Hugh Bush
  - Shadow of Hate 1996 Acad. Award nominee- Guggenheim Productions
  - Pen Pals dir, Mary Kotzke
  - Who Shot Pat? starring Sandra Bullock dir. Bob Brooks
  - In a Pig's Eye starring David Canary dir. John Saffron
  - The Johnstown Flood 1993 Acad. Award winner Short Documentary- Guggenheim Prods.
  - Sharks of Treasure Island Cousteau Society
- Network
  - Hiroshima, Rage and Betrayal, Pot of Gold -Peter Jennings ABC
  - Turning Point – ABC Series (17)
  - The Century -ABC (26)
  - Gettin' Over with Tony Danza ABC Series (9)
  - Tyson: The Fallen Champ 2 hour NBC Movie of the Week dir. Barbara Kopple
  - Trackdown ABC series (3)
  - Code One ABC Special
  - Brides ABC Special
  - We're Expecting ABC Special
  - America's Missing Children CBS Special
  - Body Watching CBS special
  - Yearbook Fox series (11)
  - Urban Anxiety Fox series (9)
- Public television
  - Finding Your Roots (2011–12)
  - The Buddha (2010)
  - The Trials of J. Robert Oppenheimer (2009)
  - The Adirondacks
  - George H. W. Bush
  - Bill Moyers Journal (2007)
  - Out of the Shadows
  - The Mysterious Human Heart (2007)
  - The Jewish Americans (2007)
  - Oprah's Roots (2007)
  - African American Lives I and II (2006) (2008)
  - Victory in the Pacific (2005)
  - RFK (2005)
  - Marie Antoinette (2006)
  - Religion and Ethics -theme
  - Destination America (2005)
  - Young Dr. Freud Emmy nominee for original score
  - The Windsors 4-hour mini-series
  - Degenerate Art PBS (David Grubin)
  - Napoleon 4-hour mini-series
  - HOXIE: The First Stand (Peabody Award)
  - Jim Crow
  - American Experience – WGBH
  - Surrender in the Pacific (2005)
  - The Kennedys Emmy winner for Outstanding Achievement in Music, (News and Documentary)
  - FDR Peabody Award winner
  - Amelia Earhart
  - LBJ National Emmy Nominee David Grubin Chicago Film Fest. Gold Plaque Award for Music
  - Eisenhower
  - MacArthur
  - Lincoln
  - Andrew Carnegie
  - Gold Fever
  - Teddy Roosevelt (TR)
  - The Last Boss (Daley)
  - Orphan Trains
  - The Wright Stuff
  - Journey to America
  - The World That Moses Built
  - The Great Air Race
  - Hurricane of 1938
  - Reagan
  - Truman (Emmy Winner)
  - Alone on the Ice (Admiral Byrd)
  - Dust Bowl
  - America 1900 (Emmy winner, Peabody Award winner)
  - Smithsonian World
  - The Wyeths (adaptation of Ann Wyeth McCoy’s music) Emmy winner 1988 (David Grubin)
  - Voices of Latin America
  - Bill Moyers on PBS
  - Healing and the Mind 1993 National Emmy winner Inf. Series (5)
  - Bill Moyers’ Journal
  - In Search of the Constitution
  - A Second Look
  - Report from Philadelphia
  - The Secret Government
  - God and Politics
  - World of Ideas
  - Power of the Word
  - Nova -WGBH
  - Shackleton
  - World in the Balance
  - In Search of the Super Twister
  - The Big Dig
  - Trillion Dollar Bet
  - Electric Heart
  - Rescue Mission in Space
  - Eclipse of the Century
  - In Search of the Lost Language
  - Roller Coaster
  - Condors
  - Buried in Ash
  - Sick Buildings
  - Meteors
  - WNET
  - Theme for The Musicals 1990 Emmy Best Director (John Merdin)
  - America on Wheels
- Cable
  - The Man who Loved Sharks (Nigel Noble) 1992 ACE Award Nominee-Best Original Score
  - Marilyn: The Last Interview (HBO)
  - LOCOMOTION Engines of Enterprise (BBC)
  - Shoot the Clock Lifetime
  - Addicted Lifetime
  - Multiple Personality Disorder (HBO)
  - Mitchum Ace Award Wombat Productions
  - CNN: Special Assignment Theme
  - Rediscovering America with Roger Kennedy Discovery Series (11)
  - Sports Illustrated for Kids (HBO)
  - Drining Passion (TURNER)
  - Animal ER (TURNER)
  - The Hidden Zoo (TURNER)
