= American Experience season 6 =

American Experience
- Season 6
- No. of episodes: 8

Release
- Original network: PBS
- Original release: October 27, 1993 – May 25, 1994

Season chronology
- ← Previous; Season 5 Next → Season 7

Season six of the television program American Experience originally aired on the PBS network in the United States on October 27, 1993 and concluded on May 25, 1994. This is the sixth season to feature David McCullough as the host. The season contained eight new episodes and began with the film Amelia Earhart: The Price of Courage.

== Episodes ==
* Denotes multiple chapters that aired on the same date and share the same episode number

No. overall	No. in season	Title	Directed by	Categories	Original release date
68	1	"Amelia Earhart: The Price of Courage"	Nancy Porter	Biographies, Popular Culture	October 27, 1993
69	2	"The Hunt for Pancho Villa"	Hector Galan	Politics, War	November 3, 1993
70	3*	"Eisenhower (Parts 1–2)"	Adriana Bosch (Part 1) & Austin Hoyt (Part 2)	Biographies, Politics, Presidents	November 10, 1993
Part 1: "Soldier"; Part 2: "Statesman"
71	4	"The Hurricane of '38"	Michael Epstein & Thomas Lennon	The Natural Environment	November 17, 1993
72	5	"Ishi: The Last Yahi Indian"	Jed Riffe & Pamela Roberts	Biographies, Native American History	January 19, 1994
73	6	"Malcolm X: Make It Plain"	Orlando Bagwell	Biographies, Civil Rights	January 26, 1994
74	7	"America and the Holocaust"	Martin Ostrow	Politics, War	April 6, 1994
75	8	"D-Day"	Charles Guggenheim	War	May 25, 1994
