= Ernst C. Krohn =

American musicologist, collector, and professor

- Born: Ernst Christopher Krohn; December 23, 1888; New York City, New York
- Died: March 21, 1975 (aged 86); Santa Fe, New Mexico
- Occupations: Musicologist, collector, and professor

Ernst Christopher Krohn (December 23, 1888 — March 21, 1975) was an American professor, musicologist, archivist, and collector with a research focus on the music of Missouri. He wrote and published multiple books, articles, reviews, and dictionary entries as well as composed piano works. Krohn was a music professor at Washington University in St. Louis from 1939 to 1953 and Saint Louis University from 1953 to 1963. In 1966, he sold over 10,000 items from his personal music collection to the Washington University library.

== Early life ==
Ernst Christopher Krohn was born December 23, 1888, in New York City, and as a child learned piano from his father and neighborhood music teacher. In 1899, Krohn and his family moved to St. Louis, Missouri. Due to family financial troubles, Krohn dropped out of high school, with his freshman year being his last in formal education. His father began the Krohn School of Music in 1909, where Krohn started teaching full-time.

== Career ==
In 1914, Krohn was offered a job as an assistant to Ottmar Moll at Lenox Hall. This occupation then developed into a job teaching music at Ottmar Moll Piano School. Krohn taught privately until he began teaching at Washington University in 1939, ten years before the school's music department was created. He continued to teach there until 1953 when he became the head of the music department at St. Louis University. He retired in 1963, though his work in archiving and musicology continued until his death.

Krohn held a key part in establishing the rare books and scores collections at the Gaylord Music Library of Washington University. Krohn cataloged and sold over 10,000 volumes from his musicology collection to the library, bolstering its collection and allowing for the proper preservation of a multitude of musical archives.

== Death ==
Krohn died on March 21, 1975, in Santa Fe, New Mexico. He moved from St. Louis to Santa Fe with his sister and niece in 1974. At the time of his death, he was working on a manuscript about the history of music publication in St. Louis, which was later posthumously published in 1988 by the College Music Society.

== Works ==
Krohn published over sixty books, articles, reviews, and dictionary entries, as well as over a dozen piano works. A complete bibliography of Ernst C. Krohn's writings and compositions can be found in the reprint of Krohn's book, Missouri Music, published by Da Capo Press in 1971.

== Awards ==
- In 1959, Krohn was awarded a citation of special merit by the Missouri Historical Society for his research and publications relating to musicology.
- In 1966, Krohn was named Honorary Curator by Washington University after he sold his musicology collection to the university.
- In 2015, Krohn was posthumously inducted into the Missouri Music Hall of Fame under the category "Academics and Musicology."
