= American Experience season 8 =

American Experience
- Season 8
- No. of episodes: 9

Release
- Original network: PBS
- Original release: October 16, 1995 – February 26, 1996

Season chronology
- ← Previous; Season 7 Next → Season 9

Season eight of the television program American Experience originally aired on the PBS network in the United States on October 16, 1995 and concluded on February 26, 1996. This is the eighth season to feature David McCullough as the host. The season contained nine new episodes and began with the film Murder of the Century.

== Episodes ==
No. overall	No. in season	Title	Directed by	Categories	Original release date
84	1	"Murder of the Century"	Carl Charlson	Popular Culture	October 16, 1995
A film about the 1906 murder of architect Stanford White by wealthy heir Harry Kendall Thaw over singer and model Evelyn Nesbit.
85	2	"Edison's Miracle of Light"	John Walter	Biographies, Technology	October 23, 1995
86	3	"Chicago 1968"	Chana Gazit	Politics, Popular Culture	November 13, 1995
The film examines the protest activity surrounding the 1968 Democratic National Convention in Chicago, Illinois.
87	4	"The Orphan Trains"	Janet Graham & Edward Gray	Popular Culture	November 27, 1995
88	5	"Freedom on My Mind"	Connie Field & Marilyn Mulford	Civil Rights	January 15, 1996
89	6	"Daley: The Last Boss"	Barak Goodman	Biographies, Politics	January 22, 1996
90	7	"The Battle Over Citizen Kane"	Michael Epstein & Thomas Lennon	Popular Culture	January 29, 1996
91	8	"The Wright Stuff"	Nancy Porter	Biographies, Technology	February 12, 1996
92	9	"Spy in the Sky"	Linda Garmon	Technology, War	February 26, 1996
The film chronicles the 1960 U-2 incident that involved CIA pilot Francis Gary Powers whose Lockheed U-2 spy plane was shot down over Soviet airspace during the Cold War.
