= American Experience season 7 =

American Experience
- Season 7
- No. of episodes: 8

Release
- Original network: PBS
- Original release: October 11, 1994 – May 9, 1995

Season chronology
- ← Previous; Season 6 Next → Season 8

Season seven of the television program American Experience originally aired on the PBS network in the United States on October 11, 1994 and concluded on May 9, 1995. This is the seventh season to feature David McCullough as the host. The season contained eight new episodes and began with the first two parts of the FDR film, "The Center of the World" and "Fear Itself". A new opening sequence was introduced in this season, set on a waving blue background, and featuring many stars morphing into shapes.

== Episodes ==
* Denotes multiple chapters that aired on the same date and share the same episode number

| No. overall | No. in season | Title | Directed by | Categories | Original release date |
|---|---|---|---|---|---|
| 76 | 1* | "FDR (Parts 1–2)" | David Grubin | Biographies, Politics, Presidents, War | October 11, 1994 |
Part 1: "The Center of the World"; Part 2: "Fear Itself"
| 77 | 2* | "FDR (Parts 3–4)" | David Grubin | Biographies, Politics, Presidents, War | October 12, 1994 |
Part 3: "The Grandest Job in the World"; Part 4: "The Juggler"
| 78 | 3 | "Telegrams from the Dead" | Matthew Collins | Popular Culture | October 19, 1994 |
| 79 | 4 | "Midnight Ramble" | Pearl Bowser & Bestor Cram | Civil Rights, Popular Culture | October 26, 1994 |
| 80 | 5 | "Battle of the Bulge" | Thomas Lennon | War | November 9, 1994 |
| 81 | 6 | "One Woman, One Vote" | Ruth Pollak | Biographies, Civil Rights | February 15, 1995 |
| 82 | 7* | "The Way West (Parts 1–2)" | Ric Burns | The American West | May 8, 1995 |
Part 1: "Westward 1845–1864"; Part 2: "Approach of Civilization, 1865–1869"
| 83 | 8* | "The Way West (Parts 3–4)" | Ric Burns | The American West | May 9, 1995 |
Part 3: "War for the Black Hills, 1870–1876"; Part 4: "Ghost Dance, 1877–1893"
