= Henry Hampton =

American film director (1940–1998)

- Born: Henry Eugene Hampton Jr. January 8, 1940; St. Louis, Missouri, U.S.
- Died: November 22, 1998 (aged 58); Boston, Massachusetts, U.S.
- Education: College of the Holy Cross; Washington University in St. Louis
- Known for: Eyes on the Prize; The Great Depression

Henry Eugene Hampton Jr. (8 January 1940 – 22 November 1998) was an American filmmaker. His production company, Blackside, Inc., produced over 80 programs—the most recognizable being the documentary Eyes on the Prize, which won six Emmy Awards, the Peabody Award, and was nominated for an Oscar.

Blackside became one of the largest minority-owned non-theatrical film production companies in the U.S. during the mid-1970s and until his death in the late 1990s.

== Biography ==
=== Early life and education ===
Hampton was the son of surgeon Henry Hampton Sr. and Julia Veva Hampton, raised in Richmond Heights, Missouri, a suburb adjacent to the western edge of St. Louis. Henry lived on the eastern edge of the all-black working class community of Hadley Township. His family converted to Catholicism after St Louis Archbishop Joseph Ritter led desegregation efforts in the region.

Hampton attended Little Flower School and later the Jesuits' St. Louis University High School and the College of the Holy Cross, before studying literature at Washington University in St. Louis. He graduated from WashU in 1961. Hampton attended medical school for a term at McGill University in Montreal, Quebec, before dropping out.

=== Career ===
In 1965, while working for the Unitarian church as information director, Hampton went to Selma, Alabama, to participate in the Selma Marches (flying down on the same plane as James Reeb, the UU minister who would later be murdered during his trip). The marches changed Hampton's life, as he recognized the power of media and television and began to conceptualize a film documenting the Civil Rights Movement.

Three years later, in 1968 (while living in Roxbury, Boston), he founded Blackside, Inc., which offered "special expertise in the design and production of film and audio-visual products aimed at minority audiences." It became one of the largest minority-owned non-theatrical film production companies in the U.S. during the mid-1970s and until his death in the late 1990s. Hampton and his company produced over 80 programs including documentaries, television spots, and other media productions.

Blackside's primary business between 1968 and 1979 was the production of films, television and radio spots, television programming, and audio-visual educational packages. Blackside also produced public service announcements and film-based training materials for government and commercial clients. In 1977, the Harvard School of Design granted Hampton a Loeb Fellowship to study constitutional limitations and the nature of media and government information programs. His studies focused on consumers' and citizens' rights to information.

Hampton made a commitment to social justice with later productions, including his 1987 magnum opus Eyes on the Prize: America's Civil Rights Years (1954–1965). He followed this with a series of pieces, including Eyes on the Prize II: America at the Racial Crossroads 1965–mid 1980s; The Great Depression (1993); Malcolm X: Make It Plain (1994); America's War on Poverty (1995); Breakthrough: The Changing Face of Science in America (1997); I'll Make Me a World: A Century of African-American Arts (1999); Hopes on the Horizon: Africa in the 1990s (2001); This Far by Faith: African American Spiritual Journeys (2003).

He returned to WashU in 1989 to deliver the commencement speech.

=== Health issues and death ===
Hampton had contracted polio as a child. In his later years, he had lung cancer, the treatment for which led to myelodysplastic syndrome.

He died at Brigham and Women's Hospital on November 22, 1998.

== Legacy ==
Hampton's film archive is held by the Washington University Film & Media Archive in St. Louis, Missouri. In addition to Hampton's films, the collection contains all of the elements that went into the production process such as interviews, stock footage, photographs, research, producer notes, scripts, and Hampton's personal papers.

=== Honorary degrees ===
He was the recipient of over 10 honorary degrees including an Honorary Doctorate of Humanities from his alma mater (1989); St. Louis University (1988); Doctor of Arts, Northeastern University (1988); Suffolk University (1988); Bridgewater State College (1989); Brandeis University (1993); Boston College (1993); Emerson College (1995); Lincoln University (1996) and Tufts University (1996).

== Awards ==
Hampton and Blackside won many major awards in television broadcasting. They were recognized by organizations in the fields of journalism, history, and the arts.

- 7 Emmy Awards
- One Academy Award nomination
- George Foster Peabody Awards (multiple)
- Ralph Lowell Award For Outstanding Contribution to Public Television(1993)
- The first Harold C. Fleming Award for "a lifetime of service in the field of political participation and community education against hatred in politics." (1994).
- The 1st Annual Heinz Award in the Arts and Humanities (1995)
- International Documentary Association Career Achievement Award
- Erik Barnouw Award, Organization of American Historians
- John Stoneman Rena Award, Outstanding contributions to the motion picture industry
- The DuPont Columbia Award, Excellence in Broadcast Journalism (multiple)
- Edward R. Murrow Brotherhood Award
- Who's Who in America: Fifty-second Edition
- African-American Achievement Award, City of Boston, For Excellence in the Arts
- PBS Salute, Prism Award: Lifetime of Achievement award

== Filmography ==
- America's War on Poverty (5-part series)
- Boston Black United Front
- Breakthrough: The Changing Face of Science in America (6-part series)
- Code Blue
- Crisis to Crisis: Voices of a Divided City
- Easy Street
- Eyes on the Prize (14-part series)
  - Eyes on the Prize I: America's Civil Rights Years 1954-1965
  - Eyes on the Prize II: America at the Racial Crossroads 1965-1985
- The Great Depression (7-part series)
- Head Start to Confidence
- Hopes on the Horizon: Africa in the 1990s
- I'll Make Me A World: A Century of African American Arts (6-part series)
- In Search of Help: Welfare or Survivor's Benefits
- Kinfolks
- Malcolm X: Make It Plain
- This Far By Faith: African American Spiritual Journeys (6-part series)
- Reorganizing the Nation's Hospitals (1975)

== Organizations ==
In addition to his work with Blackside Inc., Hampton was involved in a number of other organizations, including:

- Museum of Afro-American History in Boston, Chair of the Board.
- Children's Defense Fund, board member.
- Boston Center for the Arts, board member.
- Beacon Press, Advisory Board.
- Unitarian Universalist Association, Director of Information (1963–1968).
