= Judith Dwan Hallet =

American documentary filmmaker (born 1941)

- Born: Judith Ann Dwan; 1941 (age 84–85); San Francisco, California, U.S.
- Education: Sarah Lawrence College (BA); University of California, Los Angeles; University of Utah (MA)
- Occupation: Documentary filmmaker
- Spouse: Stanley Ira Hallet
- Parent(s): Robert Dwan; Lois Smith Dwan

Judith Dwan Hallet (born 1941) is an American documentary filmmaker who made 32 films covering people and events around the world during her 45 year career.

== Early life ==
Hallet was born Judith Ann Dwan in 1941 in San Francisco, California. Her father, Robert Dwan, was a radio and television producer, director and writer including for You Bet Your Life starring Groucho Marx (1947–1961). Her mother, Lois Smith Dwan, was a restaurant critic for the Los Angeles Times.

Hallet graduated in 1964 with a Bachelor of Arts degree from Sarah Lawrence College in Bronxville, New York, where she specialized in filmmaking her senior year. While a Peace Corps Volunteer in Tunisia teaching English as Second Language (1964-1966), Hallet co-directed her first hour-long documentary film in French on The Berber Villages of Southern Tunisia. After returning to the United States, she did graduate studies in film at UCLA and married Stanley Ira Hallet, an architect and professor of architecture. She moved to Salt Lake City where she made several short documentary films with her husband. In 1971, she received a Master of Arts degree in French from the University of Utah.

== Filmmaking career ==
In 1971, Stanley Hallet accepted a Fulbright lectureship to the Department of Architecture at Kabul University in Afghanistan. While there Hallet and her husband made two documentaries, The Painted Truck and The Nomads of Badakhshan. These films are still widely shown and have become classics for the Afghan diaspora living in the United States and Europe because they depict Afghanistan before recent wars ravaged the country.

After returning from Afghanistan, Hallet accepted a job as a documentary filmmaker and producer/reporter for KUTV, the NBC affiliate in Salt Lake City, Utah. During her 14 years as a member of the EXTRA team at KUTV, Hallet produced over 100 short films and 25 long form documentaries. The subjects were extremely varied and included the documentaries Buckaroos, Navajo Hopi Land Dispute, and A Very Special Dance.

After moving to Washington D.C., Hallet worked for National Geographic Television’s weekly show, National Geographic Explorer, as the Senior Producer supervising over 60 documentaries as well as producing and directing four of her own including The Life and Legend of Jane Goodall, Gauchos, and El Dorado Gold. After leaving National Geographic in 1991, Hallet produced and directed 17 hour-long documentary films through her own company, Judith Dwan Hallet Productions, Inc. Again her films were diverse from The American Buffalo Battling Back to Witness to Hope: The Life and Times of Pope John Paul II to Moby-Dick and Lords of the Garden (on a tribe in Western Papua New Guinea).

Numerous newspaper and magazine articles describe and review Hallet's films.

== Filmography ==
Hallet was producer and director of the following films, unless noted.

=== 1960s and 1970s films ===
- Berber Villages of Southern Tunisia (1968)(Co-directed with Stanley Hallet)
- The Painted Truck (1972)(Co-directed with Stanley Hallet)
- The Nomads of Badakhshan (1972) (Co-directed with Stanley Hallet) Finalist at American Film Festival (New York, 1975)
- The Longest War (1973)(Editor & cameraperson only; Director: Diane Orr)
- I Love to be Happy (1975)(Also writer) First place at International Festival of Women's Films (New York, 1977); Finalist at American Film Festival (New York, 1977)
- Polygamy, Prospering in Exile (1975)(Editor, sound person & cameraperson only; Director: Lucky Severson)
- Sure I can Dance (1976) Finalist at American Film Festival (New York, 1978)
- Her Honor the Judge: Riva Beck Besone (1977) (Editor & sound person only; Director: Diane Orr) Second place at Denver International Film Festival (1979)
- A Very Special Dance (1978) (Co-produced & co-directed with Karl Idsvoog) First place NATPE IRIS award (1979); First place at Denver International Film Festival (1979); Finalist at American Film Festival (New York, 1979)

=== 1980s films ===
- The Navajo Hopi Land Dispute: On the Verge of War (1981) Nominated for Rocky Mountain EMMY (1982)
- Love and the Mentally Handicapped: Special Love (1981) (Also writer) Nominated for Rocky Mountain EMMY (1982); First place NAPTE IRIS award (1983)
- Street People: Faces of the Street (1983) Nominated for Rocky Mountain EMMY (1983); First place at Utah Film & Video Festival (1983)
- A Life of Crime (1984)(Co-produced & co-directed with Deborah Lindner) Gold Award at International Film & TV Festival of New York (1984); Special Jury Award at San Francisco International Film Festival (1985)
- The Mormons: Living in Zion (1984) (Co-produced & co-directed with Deborah Lindner) Red Ribbon at American Film Festival (New York, 1985)
- The Buckaroos (1985) Rocky Mountain EMMY (1986); Second place NAPTE IRIS award (1986)
- The Last Stand of the Tarahumaras (1986)(Co-producer & co-director with Mike Rossen) Second place NAPTE IRIS award (1987)
- El Dorado Gold (1988) (Co-produced with Wolfgang Bayer)Produced for National Geographic Television, Explorer; Gold award at Houston International Film Festival (1989)

=== 1990s films ===
- The Life and Legend of Jane Goodall: My Life With the Chimpanzees (1990)
  Produced for National Geographic Television, Explorer; Lillian Gish Award for Best Woman Director of the Year (1990), Chris (First Place) Award, Columbus International Film Festival (1990)
- Gauchos (1991)
  Produced for National Geographic Television, Explorer; Nominated for EMMY for cinematography (1991)
- Battle for the Great Plains (1992)
  Produced for Audubon Society, aired on PBS; Golden Eagle Award at Cine Film & Video Festival (1992)
- An American Reunion Inauguration (1993)(Segment producer)
  Produced for JWM Productions & Time/Life Television; Golden Eagle Award at CINE Film & Video Festival (1993)
- Lords of the Garden: Tree House People Cannibal Justice (1994; also co-writer with Michael Olmert)
  Produced for Smithsonian Institution/Hearst Entertainment, aired on A&E; Outstanding Documentary & Golden Eagle Awards, CINE Film & Video Festival (1995), Gold Award, Houston International Film Festival (1995)
- Murphy Oil. A Story of Leadership and Innovation (1995; also writer)
  Winner of New York Film Festival (1995), Golden Eagle Award, CINE Film & Video Festival (1995)
- Moby-Dick (1996; also writer)
  Produced for Cronkite Ward TV for Discovery Communications, aired on The Learning Channel Great Books (TV Program); Gold Award, Houston International Film Festival (1997), Golden Eagle Award, CINE Film & Video Festival (1997)
- A Place in the Land (1997; field director)
  Produced for Guggenheim Productions; Academy Award nomination for Best Documentary (Short Subject)(1998)
- American Buffalo Battling Back, Spirit of a Nation (1998; also writer)
  Produced for The National Wildlife Federation & WNET for "Nature", aired on PBS; Best of Festival Masters Series Award, CINE (2000), Best Documentary, Malibu International Film Festival (1999)
- Stealing Time: The New Science of Aging. Turning Back the Clock (1999; also writer)
  Aired on PBS; Gold Award, Houston International Film Festival (2000), Golden Eagle, CINE Film & Video Festival (2000)

=== 2000s and 2010s films ===
- Building Big: Dams (2000)(Also co-written with Larry Klein)Produced for WGBH/NOVA & aired on PBS, George Peabody Award
- Witness to Hope. The Life of Karol Wojtyla, Pope John Paul II (2001)(Also writer; Co-produced with Catherine Wyler)Aired on PBS, Special Jury Gold Award, Houston International Film Festival (2002), Platinum Best of Show for Directing and Gold Award for Documentary, Aurora Awards (2005)
- The Strange Case of Dr. Jekyll and Mr.Hyde (2002)(Also writer)Produced for Cronkite Ward TV for Discovery Communications, aired on The Learning Channel; Golden Eagle Award at CINE Film & Video Festival (2003), Platinum Award at Houston International Film Festival (2003)
- John Kluge: The Will to Make a Difference (2003) (Also writer)
- The Force Behind the Veil: Women Leaders of Yemen (2006)(Director) Produced for The National Democratic Institute
- Tale of the Tongs (2013)(Co-produced & co-directed with Stanley Hallet; also writer)

== Publications ==
- Discovering Tunisian Cuisine. Co-authored with Raoudha Guellali Ben Taarit and Hasna Trabelsi. Spirit of Place/Spirit of Design, 2019. ISBN 978-1-7923-1830-6.
- From Groucho to Gauchos: Adventures of a Documentary Filmmaker. Spirit of Place/Spirit of Design, 2022. ISBN 979-8-3507-0418-1.

== General awards and recognition ==
Awards for specific films are in the Filmography section.

- Woman of Vision Award for Creative Excellence, 1995, Women in Film & Video, Washington DC (Also known as the Women in Film & Video-DC Women of Vision Awards)
- Mayor’s Art Award for Excellence in an Artistic Discipline, 2001, Washington DC Commission on the Arts and Humanities
- Emmy for Outstanding Contribution to the Profession in the Last 25 years, 2008, The National Capital Chesapeake Bay Chapter of the National Academy of Television Arts & Sciences
- Around the World on Film with Judy Dwan Hallet, 2013, Cosmos Club, Washington, D.C.
- An Evening with Judith Dwan Hallet, 2013, National Press Club, Washington, D.C.
- March Filmmaker of the Month Award, 2015, District of Columbia Office of Motion Picture & Television Development
- Women of Impact Award for Lifetime Achievement, 2023, Chesapeake Film Festival, Easton, Maryland
- Utah Documentary Association, 2024, Salt Lake City, Utah

== Archives ==
Hallet's films and videos are archived at The University of Utah, J. Willard Marriott Library Special Collections. Hallet's papers and journals are archived in the same Library.
