= A City Decides =

1956 film

- Directed by: Charles Guggenheim
- Production companies: Charles Guggenheim & Associates for the Fund for the Republic
- Distributed by: Universal Pictures
- Release date: 1956
- Running time: 27 minutes
- Country: United States
- Language: English

A City Decides is a 1956 American short documentary film directed by Charles Guggenheim about the racial integration of St. Louis Public Schools. It was nominated for an Academy Award for Best Documentary Short.

== See also ==
- Civil rights movement in popular culture
