= Robert Kennedy Remembered =

1968 film

- Directed by: Charles Guggenheim
- Written by: Charles Guggenheim; L.T. Iglehart
- Produced by: Charles Guggenheim
- Starring: Robert F. Kennedy
- Edited by: Robert Pierce; Michael Ritter; Werner Schumann
- Music by: Robert Wykes
- Production companies: Guggenheim Productions; National General Pictures
- Distributed by: Guggenheim Productions
- Release dates: August 26, 1968 (Chicago, Illinois)
- Running time: 30 minutes
- Country: United States
- Language: English

Robert Kennedy Remembered is a 1968 American short documentary film produced and directed by Charles Guggenheim. In 1969, it won an Oscar for Best Short Subject at the 41st Academy Awards.

== Cast ==
- Robert F. Kennedy as himself (archive footage)

== See also ==
- Robert F. Kennedy in media
