= A Place in the Land =

1998 film

- Film poster
- Directed by: Charles Guggenheim
- Written by: Charles Guggenheim (concept)
- Produced by: Judith Hallet (field producer); Grace Guggenheim (executive producer)
- Narrated by: Peter Coyote
- Cinematography: Erich Roland
- Edited by: Catherine Shields; Greg Henry
- Music by: Michael Bacon
- Production company: The Woodstock Foundation
- Distributed by: Billings Farm & Museum
- Release date: 1998
- Running time: 32 minutes
- Country: United States
- Language: English

A Place in the Land is a 1998 American short documentary film directed by Charles Guggenheim with field director Judith Dwan Hallet. It was nominated for an Academy Award for Best Documentary Short.

A Place in the Land considers the history of conservation stewardship in America as reflected in the property of Billings Farm, an operating dairy farm in Woodstock, Vermont first established in 1871, and the 555-acre (2.25 km^{2}) Mount Tom, as well as through the work of George Perkins Marsh, Frederick Billings, and Laurance Rockefeller, who were successive residents of the estate. The documentary is shown daily at the visitor center for the Billings Farm & Museum and the Marsh-Billings-Rockefeller National Historical Park. The National Park Service and the American Memory project of the Library of Congress served as advisers to the Woodstock Foundation in the production of the film.
