= The Klan: A Legacy of Hate in America =

1982 film

- Directed by: Werner Schumann
- Written by: Charles Guggenheim; Patsy Sims
- Produced by: Charles Guggenheim; Werner Schumann
- Narrated by: James Whitmore
- Cinematography: Wayne Ewing
- Edited by: Werner Schumann
- Production company: Guggenheim Productions
- Distributed by: Southern Poverty Law Center; Films Incorporated
- Release date: 1982
- Country: United States
- Language: English

The Klan: A Legacy of Hate in America is a 1982 American short documentary film directed by Werner Schumann. It was nominated for an Academy Award for Best Documentary Short.
