= The Wright Stuff (film) =

1996 television documentary film

- Genre: Documentary
- Written by: Nancy Porter
- Directed by: Nancy Porter
- Narrated by: Garrison Keillor
- Music by: Michael Bacon
- Country of origin: United States
- Original language: English

Production
- Producers: Nancy Porter; Kate Hudec
- Cinematography: Peter Hoving
- Editor: Jeanne Jordan
- Running time: 56 minutes
- Production company: Nancy Porter Productions

Original release
- Network: PBS
- Release: February 12, 1996

The Wright Stuff is a 1996 television documentary film about Orville and Wilbur Wright, the brothers who invented the first successful motor-powered airplane. Produced by PBS for The American Experience (now simply American Experience) documentary program, it recounts the lives of the Wright brothers from their early childhood in Ohio with dreams of flight to their subsequent fame after their successful 1908 demonstration in France. The film was written, produced, and directed by Nancy Porter, narrated by Garrison Keillor, and hosted by David McCullough, and was first aired on PBS in the United States on February 12, 1996.

McCullough himself would later become interested in the brothers' story, writing his own book about the Wright family in 2015.

== Interviewees ==
- Joseph Corn, historian
- Tom Crouch, National Air and Space Museum
- John Gillikin, national park service
- Peter Jakab, National Air and Space Museum
- Ivonette Wright-Miller, niece
- Robert Wohl, historian
- Wilkinson Wright, grand-nephew

== Release ==
"The Wright Stuff" originally aired on PBS as part of The American Experience documentary program on February 12, 1996.

For home media, the film was first released on VHS in 1996. Later, it was released on DVD in North America on August 5, 2003.
