= The Johnstown Flood (1989 film) =

1989 film

- Directed by: Charles Guggenheim
- Written by: Charles Guggenheim
- Produced by: Charles Guggenheim
- Narrated by: Len Cariou
- Cinematography: Erich Roland
- Edited by: Catherine Shields
- Production company: Guggenheim Productions
- Distributed by: Johnstown Flood Museum
- Release date: 1989
- Running time: 26 minutes
- Country: United States
- Language: English

The Johnstown Flood is a 1989 American short documentary film directed by Charles Guggenheim about the Johnstown Flood. An expanded version of the film aired on the television series American Experience in 1991.

== Plot ==
The film tells the story of the flooding of the blue collar industrial city known as Johnstown, Pennsylvania and the 2,000 residents who lived there caused by heavy rains on the neglected South Fork Dam owned by wealthy industrialists from Pittsburgh who used it as apleasure lake for their families.

== Cast ==
- Len Cariou as narrator

== Accolades ==
The film won the Oscar at the 62nd Academy Awards for Documentary Short Subject.

== See also ==
- Still image film
- Ken Burns effect
- Reenactments
