= Washington University Libraries =

Library system of Washington University in Missouri, United States

John M. Olin Library, Washington University in St. Louis
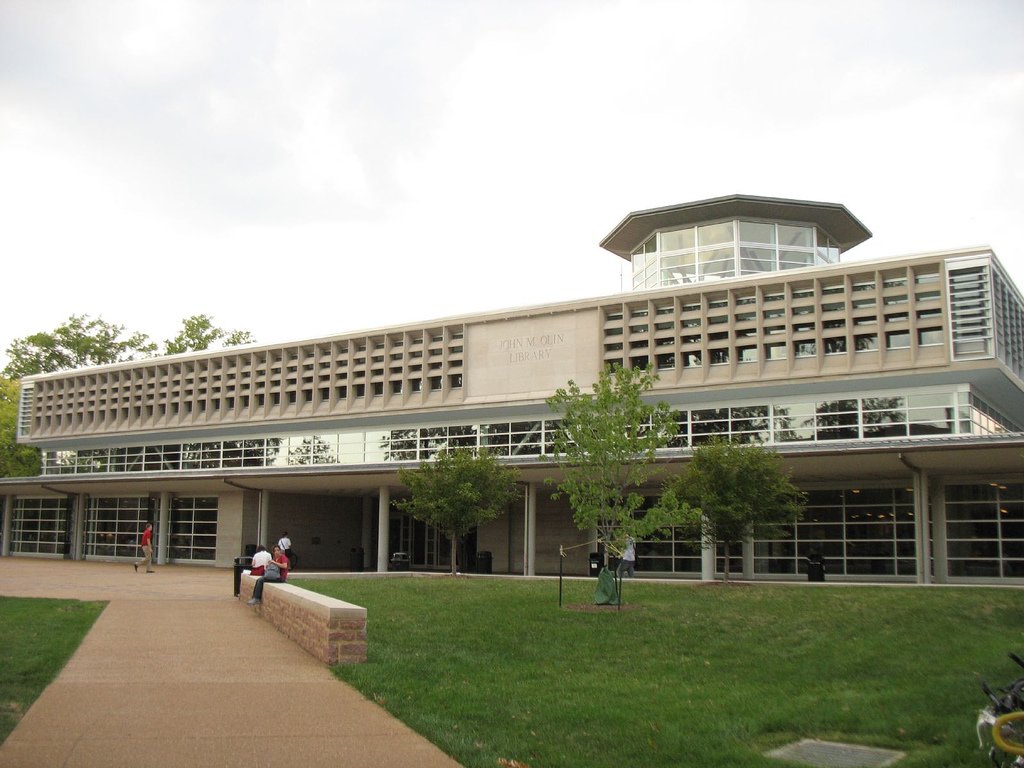
- John M. Olin Library
- 38.6486°N 90.3078°W
- Established: 1853
- Branches: 9

Collection
- Size: 5.5 million volumes

Other information
- Director: Mimi Calter
- Employees: 152
- Website: library.wustl.edu

Washington University Libraries is the library system of Washington University in St. Louis. The Washington University Libraries are a powerful network of academic resources featuring 9 University Libraries (7 locations on the Danforth Campus, one on the West Campus, and one at the Medical School); vast print and electronic collections; and expert librarians whose priority is helping students and faculty find the information they need. The John M. Olin Library is the central library.

== Olin Library ==
Centrally located on the Danforth Campus, just west of the Brookings Quadrangle, Olin Library houses general–interest materials and collections in the humanities, social sciences, biology, mathematics and engineering. It is also a designated federal depository library and houses over 70,000 microfilms.

Olin Library also houses the Julian Edison Department of Special Collections, which includes the literary papers of James Merrill, Samuel Beckett, Howard Nemerov, Stanley Elkin, William Gass, Mona Van Duyn, and many other important writers. Special Collections focuses on six primary areas: the Dowd Illustration Research Archive, Film & Media Archive, Local History, Manuscripts, Rare Books, and the University Archives. The Washington University Film & Media Archive within Special Collections includes material created by alumnus Henry Hampton documenting the Civil Rights Movement.

Built in the early 1960s after a gift from John M. Olin and opened in 1962, the John M. Olin Library replaced the university's former main library at Ridgley Hall. In 2004, the Olin Library was rededicated after a comprehensive renovation and an expansion of the main floor. This process took more than three years. The library contains a cafe/coffee shop, study spaces for graduate and undergraduate students, and many general services and administrative offices of the Washington University Libraries.

The Washington University Libraries closed three Danforth Campus locations in 2021: the Chemistry Library, Gustavus A. Pfeiffer Physics Library, and Ronald Rettner Earth & Planetary Science Library. Most of the physical collections for these three spaces moved to the John M. Olin Library.

== Washington University Film & Media Archive ==
The Washington University Film & Media Archive is an archive composed of completed films and videos, most notably Eyes on the Prize the definitive documentary on America's civil rights movement. The archive also holds numerous materials that went into the creation of other works. The Archive collects photos, interviews, stock footage, producer's research notes, correspondence, treatments, and scripts, all of which provide a distinctive look at the film making at storytelling process for scholars, teachers, filmmakers, and students.

Opened in the Fall of 2002, the Film & Media Archive's first acquisition was the Henry Hampton Collection, an archive of the work of one of the most influential African–American filmmakers. For the first time ever, the tens of thousands of materials created by his company Blackside, Inc. during the production process became available for study.

The Archive has expanded from its inaugural collection to include the collection of filmmaker Bill Miles, the St. Louis Public School's educational films, and material from Insignia Films' Reporting America at War series. It continues to grow, focusing on collecting film archives that examine the great social movements of American history and African–American life and culture, and supporting documentary studies. In addition to acquiring collections of major historical importance, the Archive preserves and organizes these materials, publicizes them, and creates related educational and outreach programs.

== Documenting Ferguson ==
Following the shooting of Michael Brown, Washington University Libraries implemented a crowd–sourced digital repository to collected ephemeral documentation of the Ferguson unrest called "Documenting Ferguson". The collection accepts submissions of written testimony, images, and video related to the protests.

== Bernard Becker Medical Library ==
Located on the Washington University School of Medicine campus, Becker Library serves the Washington University School of Medicine, Barnes–Jewish Hospital, and St. Louis Children's Hospital. The mission of the Becker Medical Library is to provide information resources and technology in support of the educational, research and patient care objectives of the School of Medicine. The library contains over 146,000 volumes, along with over 9,100 print and electronic journal titles.

Becker Medical Library is organized into several departments which play unique roles in serving the Washington University School of Medicine community, including: Archives and Rare Books, Collection Management Services, Health Information Resources (Reference), and Translational Research Support.

== Leadership ==
Shirley K. Baker served as dean of Washington University Libraries from 1989 until her retirement on June 30, 2012. Her replacement, Jeffrey Trzeciak, served from July 1, 2012, until July 21, 2016. After being led on an interim basis by Marion G. Crain, a Vice Provost and Professor of Law at Washington University, Denise Stephens took over as University Librarian and Vice Provost on June 15, 2017, until May 14, 2021.

Associate University Librarian Leland Deeds led the University Libraries on an interim appointment until Deputy University Librarian at Stanford University Mimi Calter took over as University Librarian and Vice Provost on September 20, 2021.

== Specialty libraries ==
- Al and Ruth Kopolow (Business) Library – serves the Olin Business School. Databases provided by Moody's, Standard & Poor's, Hoover's, and Disclosure; receives comprehensive real–time stock and other market information through the Bloomberg and Bridge Information Systems; maintains a book collection of around 30,000 volumes and subscriptions to more than 400 major business journals, magazines, and newspapers.
- Bernard Becker Medical Library – serves as an information resource and services hub for the Washington University Medical Center and the global health sciences community.
- Brown School Library – houses social work materials, including 50,000 books, journals, publications and videos; periodical holdings consist of more than 450 current subscriptions; adds more than 1,000 bound volumes to the collection each year; strong collections in the fields of child welfare, community development, family therapy, mental health, children and youth, gerontology, public welfare, management of human services, and social policy.
- East Asian Library – serves the information and research needs of the WashU East Asian Studies Program. The East Asian Library consists almost entirely of materials in the Chinese, Japanese, and Korean languages, with over 140,000 volumes. Special holdings include the Robert S. Elegant Collection; primarily the assorted files of clippings of newspapers, magazines, and news releases covering the period of the Chinese Cultural Revolution; Nelson Wu's collection on East Asian art, architecture, and Chinese culture; and the Thomas Temple Hoopes' collection on Japanese sword and Japanese art history.
- Gaylord Music Library – a music library holds over 100,500 books and scores, 40,500 recordings and tapes, 5,200 microform items and more than 24,000 pieces of sheet music, with strong holdings in Americana, Festschriften, early music, opera, and music literature. Special collections include the Tyson Collection of 168 Mozart and 100 Beethoven first and early editions.
- Kenneth and Nancy Kranzberg Art & Architecture Library – serves the Sam Fox School of Design & Visual Arts and the Department of Art History & Archaeology.
- Law Library – the law library of Washington University School of Law. Houses strong collections in the areas of tax law, urban law, environmental law, land use planning, Chinese law, Japanese law, and international law; an official depository for federal documents published by the Government Printing Office and a depository for government publications of the state of Missouri. Contains over 650,000 volumes and volume equivalents.
- West Campus Library – contains monographs, journals, folio books, government documents, maps, recordings, and microforms. Notable collections include all titles published prior to 1801 that are not part of Special Collections and a significant portion of the university's Government Document holdings. This facility also houses a number of library offices.
