= A Time for Justice =

1994 film

- Film poster
- Produced by: Charles Guggenheim; Dan Sturman
- Production company: Guggenheim Productions
- Distributed by: Southern Poverty Law Center
- Release date: 1994
- Running time: 38 minutes
- Country: United States
- Language: English

A Time for Justice is a 1994 American short documentary film produced by Charles Guggenheim. In 1995, it won an Oscar for Documentary Short Subject at the 67th Academy Awards.

== Summary ==
The 38-minute film, narrated by Julian Bond and featuring John Lewis, presents a short history of the Civil Rights Movement using historical footage and spoken accounts of participants. Events recounted are the Montgomery bus boycott; school integration in Little Rock, Arkansas; demonstrations in Birmingham; and the 1965 Selma to Montgomery march for voting rights.

== Production ==
The film was produced by Guggenheim for the Southern Poverty Law Center.

== See also ==
- Civil rights movement in popular culture
