= My Lai (film) =

2010 American documentary film

- Written by: Barak Goodman
- Directed by: Barak Goodman
- Theme music composer: Joel Goodman
- Country of origin: United States
- Original language: English

Production
- Producer: Barak Goodman
- Editor: Nancy Novack
- Running time: 83 minutes

Original release
- Network: PBS
- Release: April 26, 2010

My Lai is a documentary film detailing the My Lai massacre. It aired as an episode of American Experience on PBS.

== Summary ==
The documentary details the 1968 My Lai Massacre and its background. Topics of the video include the men of Company C, who perpetrated the massacre, and the cover-up of the event. Hugh Thompson Jr., the rescue helicopter pilot who confronted the ground forces personally, reported the killings, and helped halt the massacre, is also covered in the documentary.

== Accolades ==
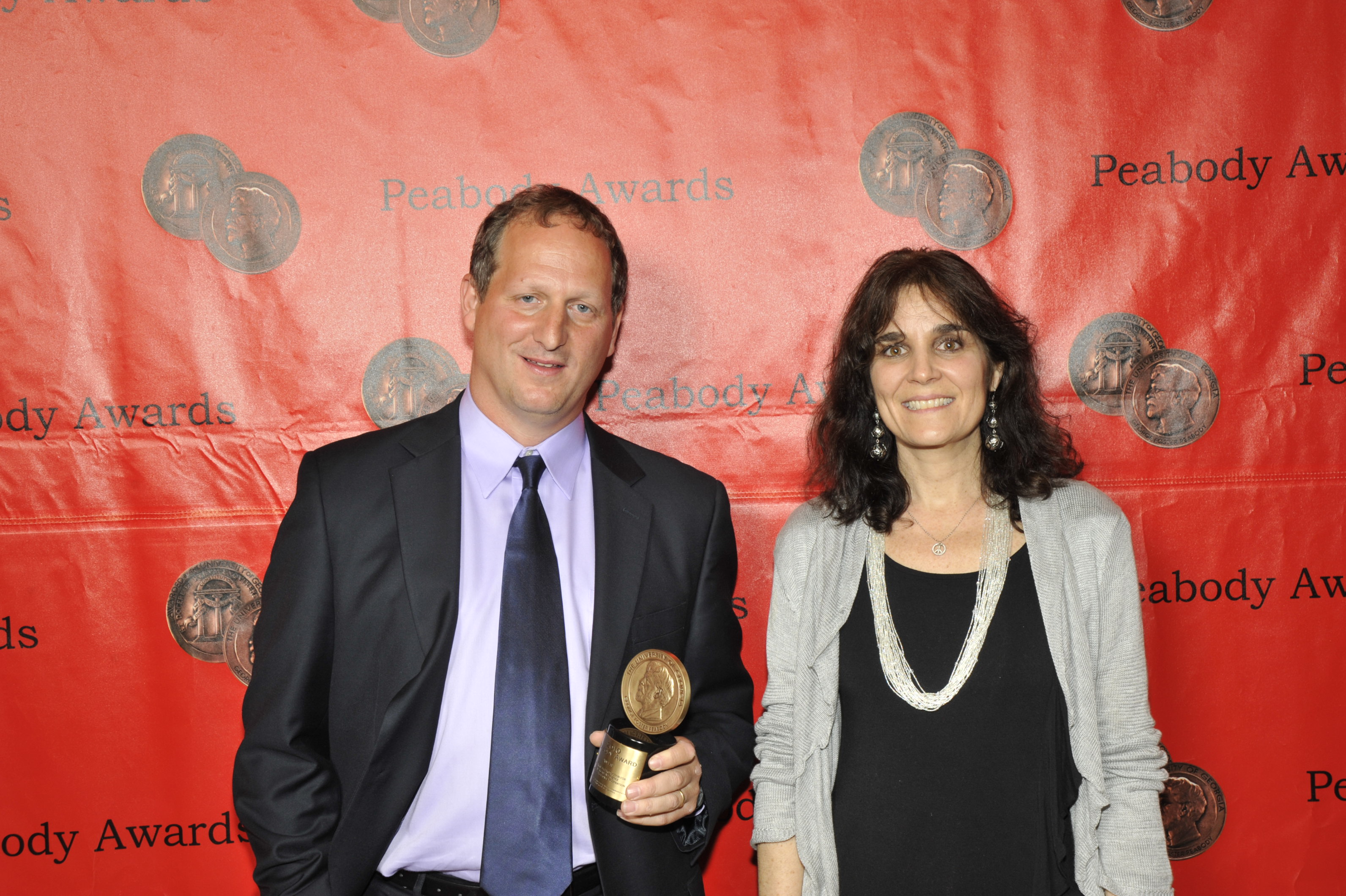
Barak Goodman and Nancy Novack, May 2011

My Lai was recognized as the 2010 Outstanding Directing For Nonfiction Programming during the Emmys. The documentary was also nominated as the 2010 Exceptional Merit In Nonfiction Filmmaking in the Emmys. The documentary was also awarded a 2010 Peabody Award.
