= Troublesome Creek: A Midwestern =

- Directed by: Steven Ascher; Jeanne Jordan
- Written by: Jeanne Jordan; Steven Ascher
- Cinematography: Steven Ascher
- Edited by: Jeanne Jordan
- Music by: Sheldon Mirowitz
- Production company: West City Films
- Distributed by: Artistic License Films
- Release date: 1995
- Running time: 88 minutes
- Country: United States
- Language: English

Troublesome Creek: A Midwestern is a 1995 documentary by filmmakers Jeanne Jordan and Steven Ascher. The film explores the family farm crisis through the story of Jordan's own family, as they take extraordinary measures to save their Iowa farm.

The film received the Grand Jury Prize and Audience Award for best documentary at the Sundance Film Festival, and was nominated for an Academy Award for Best Documentary Feature, among many other awards.

Awards
| Preceded by Crumb | Sundance Grand Jury Prize: Documentary; 1995 | Succeeded by Girls Like Us |
