= Malcolm X: Make It Plain =

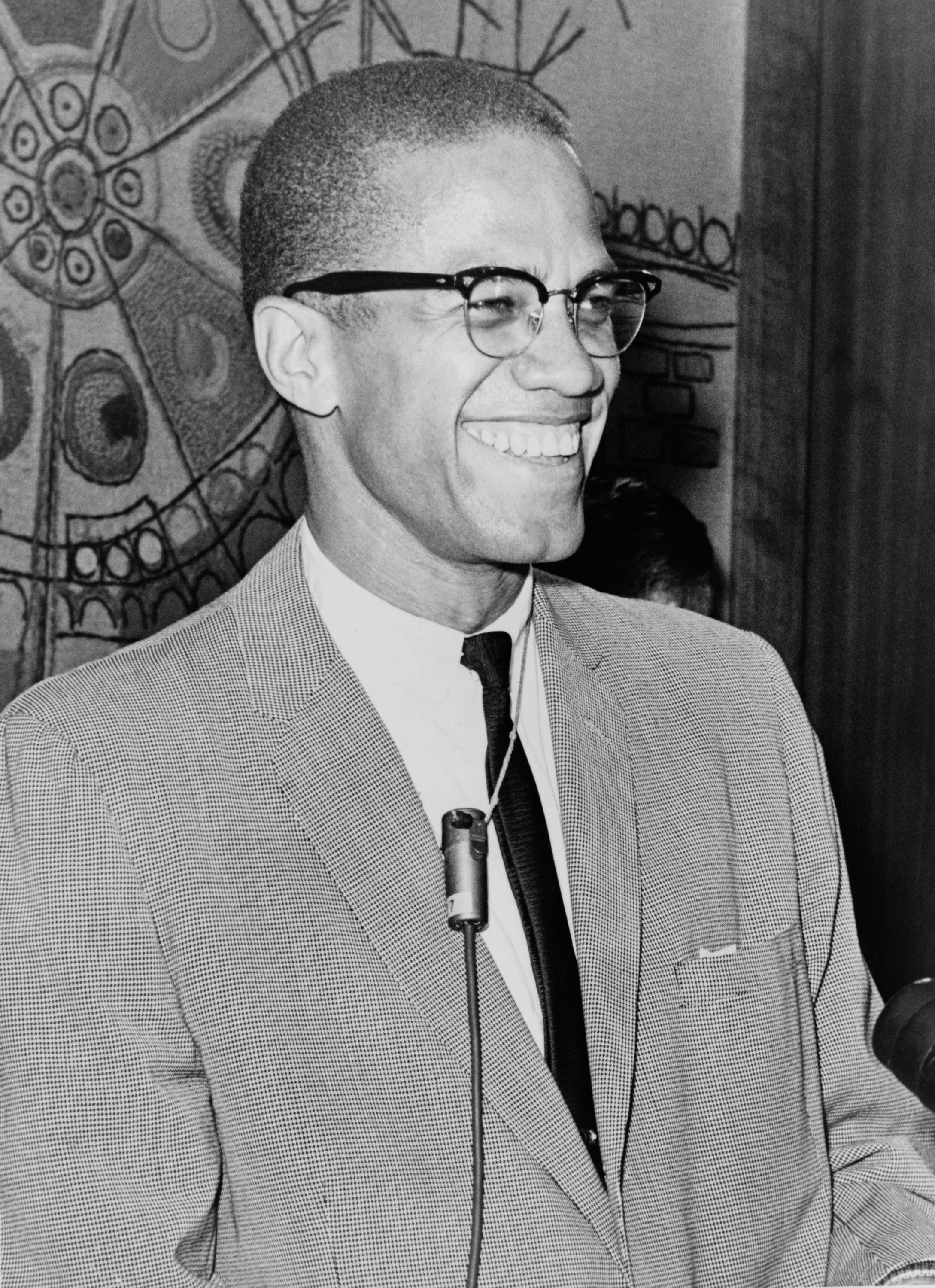
Malcom X in 1964

Malcolm X: Make It Plain is a 1994, English language documentary by PBS about the life of Malcolm X, or El-Hajj Malik El-Shabazz.

The documentary was narrated by Alfre Woodard, produced and directed by Orlando Bagwell, written by Steve Fayer and Orlando Bagwell and co-produced by Judy Richardson. Executive producer was Henry Hampton and it was shown on season 6 of American Experience.

The documentary has been screened on the BBC, History Channel, Discovery Channel, Biography and PBS.

The documentary is known for the amount of interviewees included, such as childhood friends, admirers, journalists, Nation of Islam associates, his wife, eldest child, and direct siblings, whom have never before gone public with their memories of their brother.

Interviewees include Ossie Davis, Alex Haley, Betty Shabazz and Wallace D. Muhammad, among others.

== See also ==
- The Autobiography of Malcolm X
