= Charles Guggenheim =

American documentary filmmaker (1924–2002)

- Born: Charles Eli Guggenheim; March 31, 1924; Cincinnati, Ohio, U.S.
- Died: October 9, 2002 (aged 78); Washington, D.C., U.S.
- Other name: Charles E. Guggenheim
- Education: Walnut Hills High School; University of Iowa
- Occupations: Film director; Film producer; Screenwriter
- Years active: 1952–2002
- Political party: Democratic
- Spouse: Marion Guggenheim (m. 1957; died 2002)
- Children: 3, including Davis Guggenheim

Charles Eli Guggenheim (March 31, 1924 – October 9, 2002) was an American documentary film director, producer, and screenwriter. He was the most honored documentary filmmaker in the academy history, winning four Oscars from twelve nominations.

== Early life ==
Guggenheim was born in Cincinnati, Ohio, into a prominent German-Jewish family, the son of Ruth Elizabeth (née Stix) and Jack Albert Guggenheim. His father and grandfather had a furniture business. He had dyslexia as a child but the condition went undiagnosed and he was thought to be a "slow learner." He did not learn to read until the age of nine. While studying farming at Colorado A&M in 1943, Guggenheim was drafted into the United States Army assigned to the 106th Division. Due to a severe foot infection, he avoided active duty in the Battle of the Bulge. Upon discharge from the service, he finished his college education at University of Iowa in 1948 and then moved to New York City to pursue a career in broadcasting.

== Career ==
Guggenheim's first job was working for Lew Cohen at CBS, where he was exposed to the new media of film and storytelling. He was subsequently recruited to St. Louis, Missouri, to serve as director of one of the first public television stations in the country, KETC. Two years later in 1954, Guggenheim founded his film production company, Charles Guggenheim and Associates, and produced his first feature film, The Great St. Louis Bank Robbery (1959).

In 1956, he produced the first political advertisement broadcast on television (for losing candidate Adlai Stevenson). In 1959, the Friends of the City Art Museum of Saint Louis commissioned Guggenheim to write and direct a documentary in celebration of the museum's 50th anniversary. In the early 1960s, Guggenheim formed a partnership with television and documentary film producer Shelby Storck and he and Storck collaborated on several documentaries which were nominated for and/or won Academy Awards. Guggenheim received his first Academy Award for Documentary Short Subject for 1964's Nine from Little Rock, about the desegregation effort in Little Rock, Arkansas in 1957. Storck and Guggenheim also collaborated on a well-received political film for Pennsylvania governor Milton Shapp in 1966. That year, Guggenheim moved his company and his family to Washington, D.C., where he became a media advisor to many Democratic political figures. He worked on four presidential campaigns and hundreds of gubernatorial and senatorial campaigns. He also directed several documentary films for the US Information Agency.

Guggenheim worked on Robert F. Kennedy's presidential campaign; after Sen. Kennedy was assassinated, Guggenheim was asked by the Kennedy family to put together a tribute for the 1968 Chicago Convention. It was completed in less than two months. It was shown at the convention and broadcast simultaneously. The convention hall came to a standstill for twenty minutes. The resulting film, Robert Kennedy Remembered (1968), won the Academy Award for Best Live Action Short Film.

Although Guggenheim occasionally ventured into feature and political film production, he stayed mostly with documentary films. He quit producing political campaign advertisements in the early 1980s saying, "If you play the piano in a house full of ill repute, it doesn't matter how well you play the piano." He won two more Oscars for short subject documentary film-making, for The Johnstown Flood (1989) and A Time for Justice (1995). He received twelve nominations in total.

His last documentary was produced with his daughter and colleague (since 1986), Grace Guggenheim, the 2003 TV documentary film Berga: Soldiers of Another War, a little-known story about a group of 350 American soldiers captured by the Nazis during the Battle of the Bulge who, because they were Jewish or the Nazis thought they "looked Jewish", were sent to slave labor camp and worked beside civilian political prisoners.

(Guggenheim, who was Jewish, had himself been a member of the 106th Division, which had the highest casualty rate of the Allied Divisions. But a severe leg infection caused him to be left behind when his unit was shipped overseas.)

Guggenheim finished the film six weeks before his death in October 2002 from pancreatic cancer. Soldiers and Slaves, a companion book to the film, was published by Roger Cohen, a New York Times and Herald Tribune columnist.

== Personal life ==
Guggenheim married Marion Streett in 1957. They had three children: Davis, Grace, and Jonathan. Davis followed in his father's footsteps as a documentary filmmaker and won an Oscar for best documentary in 2007 for An Inconvenient Truth.

== Honors and legacy ==
Guggenheim is recognized with a star on the St. Louis Walk of Fame.

== Archives ==
The moving image collection of Charles Guggenheim is held at the Academy Film Archive. The Charles Guggenheim papers at the academy's Margaret Herrick Library complement the film material at the Academy Film Archive. Guggenheim's film Children Without was preserved by the Academy Film Archive in 2016.

== Filmography ==
- A City Decides, 1956, nominated for the Academy Award for Best Documentary (Short Subject)
- An American Museum, 1959, documentary produced for the Friends of the City Art Museum of St. Louis
- The Great St. Louis Bank Robbery, 1959 (fictional drama)
- United in Progress, 1962, documentary produced for the US Information Agency on the tangible benefits of the Alliance for Progress
- Nine from Little Rock, 1964, winner of the 1965 Academy Award for Best Documentary (Short Subject), produced for the US Information Agency
- Children Without, 1964, nominated for the Academy Award for Best Documentary (Short Subject)
- Times of the West 1966, history of exploration and settlement of the American West and narrated by Richard Boone
- A President's Country 1966, documents the successful struggle waged by the people of the American Southwest and narrated by Gregory Peck
- Monument to the Dream, 1967, nominated for the Academy Award for Best Documentary (Short Subject) (continuously shown at the St. Louis Gateway Arch)
- Airport 1967, an impressionistic study of Kennedy Airport
- Robert Kennedy Remembered, 1968, winner of the 1969 Academy Award for Best Live Action Short Film
- Blaine Johnson 1969, story of a specialist in farm technology and a crop-duster pilot
- Jose Gonzalez 1968, the story of a 12-year-old Puerto Rican newspaper delivery boy in Chicago, IL
- Faces of Freedom 1976, an overview of American history through a walking tour of the National Portrait Gallery narrated by Charlton Heston
- An Act of Congress 1979, explores how the House of Representatives operates when considering a piece of legislation and narrated by E.G. Marshall
- The Klan: A Legacy of Hate in America, 1982 (producer only), nominated for the Academy Award for Best Documentary (Short Subject)
- High Schools, 1984, nominated for the Academy Award for Best Documentary Feature
- The Making of Liberty, 1986<
- Island of Hope, Island of Tears, 1989, narrated by Gene Hackman
- The Johnstown Flood, 1989, winner of the Academy Award for Best Documentary (Short Subject)
- A Life: The Story of Lady Bird Johnson, 1992, (feature)
- LBJ: A Remembrance, 1992
- A Time for Justice, 1994, winner of the Academy Award for Best Documentary (Short Subject)
- D-Day Remembered, 1994, nominated for the Academy Award for Best Documentary Feature
- The Shadow of Hate, 1995, nominated for Academy Award for Best Documentary (Short Subject)
- Harry S Truman 1984-1972, 1995, narrated by David McCullough
- A Place in the Land, 1998, nominated for Academy Award for Best Documentary (Short Subject)
- A Life: The Story of Lady Bird Johnson, 1999
- The First Freedom, 1999
- Berga: Soldiers of Another War, 2003, short listed for Academy Award for Best Documentary (Feature Subject)

== See also ==
- Charles Guggenheim Cinema St. Louis Award

== Sources ==
- "Charles Guggenheim". The Times. London. October 12, 2002.
- Saxon, Wolfgang (October 11, 2002). "Charles Guggenheim, Filmmaker, Dies at 78". The New York Times.
- McLellan, Dennis (October 11, 2002). "Charles Guggenheim, 78; Oscar-winning filmmaker shot political biographies". Los Angeles Times. Archived from the original on October 23, 2012.
- McLellan, Denis (October 11, 2002). "Charles Guggenheim, 78; His Documentaries Won 4 Academy Awards". Chicago Tribune. Archived from the original on October 23, 2012.
