= Truman (1997 film) =

1997 television documentary film

- Genre: Documentary
- Written by: David Grubin
- Directed by: David Grubin
- Narrated by: Jason Robards
- Music by: Michael Bacon
- Country of origin: United States
- Original language: English

Production
- Producers: Allyson Luchak (senior); David Grubin
- Cinematography: William B. Mccullough; James Callanan; Roger Phenix
- Editors: Geof Bartz; Howard Sharp
- Running time: 260 minutes
- Production company: David Grubin Productions

Original release
- Network: PBS
- Release: October 5, 1997

Truman is a 1997 two-part television documentary film about Harry S. Truman, the 33rd President of the United States. Produced by PBS for The American Experience (now American Experience) documentary program, it recounts Truman's life from childhood to his presidency. Written, co-produced, and directed by David Grubin, the film first aired on PBS in two parts on October 5 and 6, 1997.

In 1998, The American Experience became the inaugural recipient of the Primetime Emmy Award for Outstanding Documentary or Nonfiction Series for Truman.

== Interviewees ==
- Charles Babcock, Truman family neighbor
- Walt Bodine, journalist
- George M. Elsey, administrative assistant to the president
- Sue Gentry, editor, The Independence Examiner
- Ruth Gruber, Eddie Jacobson family friend
- Alonzo Hamby, biographer
- Pat Hannegan, daughter of Democratic Party chairman (Robert Hannegan)
- Ken Hechler, White House assistant
- Vernon Jarrett, journalist
- Walter LaFeber, historian
- David McCullough, biographer and historian
- Victor Reuther, assistant to the president, UAW
- Wilbur Sparks, Truman Investigating Committee
- McKinley Wooden, Battery D

== Home media ==
Truman was released on DVD by PBS on February 14, 2006. Later, it was also released in an American Experience DVD box set collecting its films about United States presidents on August 26, 2008.

== Accolades ==
Year	Group	Award	Result	Ref
1998	Primetime Emmy Awards	Outstanding Documentary or Nonfiction Series	Won	
