= The Jewish Americans =

2008 PBS miniseries

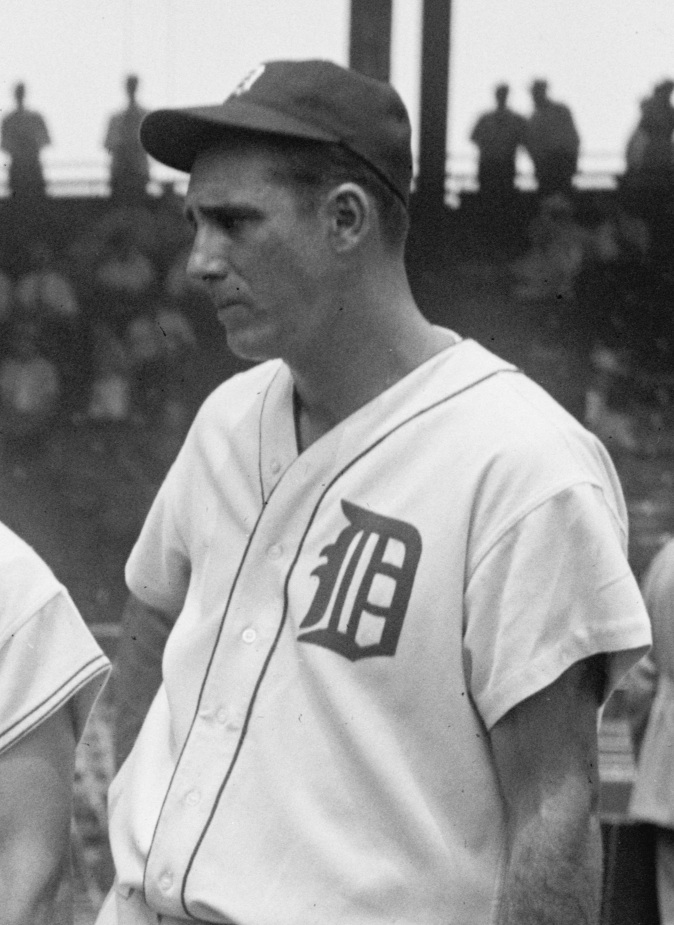
Hank Greenberg, Hall of Famer and 2-time MVP

The Jewish Americans was a three-part miniseries that originally aired on PBS during the month of January 2008. It was written and directed by David Grubin.

The series focused on the traditions and styles of American Jews, as well as their contribution to American culture and subsequent impact on American society at large.

The series was narrated by Liev Schreiber, and featured many well-known American Jews, including Louis D. Brandeis, Ruth Bader Ginsburg, Henry Morgenthau, Hank Greenberg, Betty Friedan, Molly Goldberg, Carl Reiner, Sid Caesar, and Tony Kushner.

Executive Produced by Jay Sanderson, JTN Productions
