= Michelle Ferrari =

Italian pornographic actress

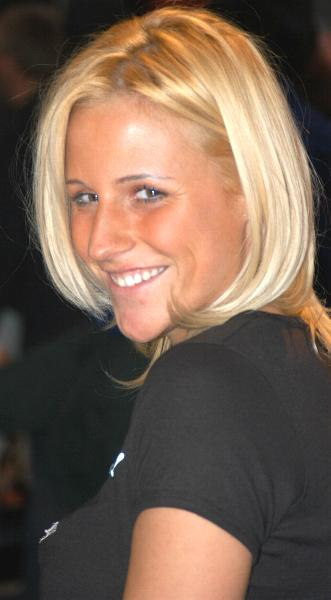
- Michelle Ferrari in 2007
- Born: Cristina Ricci; 22 December 1983 (age 42); La Spezia, Liguria, Italy
- Occupations: adult actress, TV personality

Michelle Ferrari (born 22 December 1983) is an Italian pornographic actress and television personality.

Born as Cristina Ricci in La Spezia, Ferrari started her career in 2005 with an amateur film shot with her then boyfriend. She chose her stage name thanks to a vague resemblance to the television personality Michelle Hunziker.

In 2007 she published an autobiography, Volevo essere Moana ("I wanted to be Moana"), edited by Mondadori; the book was released simultaneously with a novel of her mother, Fioralba Vittoria Latella, Ho trovato il punto G nel cuore (I have found the G-spot in my heart). Starting from 2009 until 2013, she took part in some tickling productions.

In 2012 she announced her candidature for the municipal elections in La Spezia with the Five Star Movement; her candidature was subsequently withdrawn by the same party following the ensuing clamor.

Ferrari took part in several television programmes, including Maurizio Costanzo Show and Il Bivio. In 2009 she took part at the Radio DeeJay variety television Quasi TG and co-hosted the Comedy Central show Il Filmaccio. She also starred in the practical jokes of the FX show Sexy Camera all'italiana (2009) and of the Comedy Central show Sexy Angels (2011).

In 2013 she founded a company together with adult actress Giada Da Vinci, "XXX M&G FuckTory".

Along with her career she runs an agritourism with her mother.

== Filmography ==
- Il vizio di coppia (2005)
- Michelle (2005)
- Incontro proibito (2005)
- Amami zio (2006)
- Sbattimi dietro fino a farmi male (2006)
- Sex Crime (2007)
- Irresistibile Michelle (2007)
- Luna's Angels (2007)
- Mente criminale (2007)
- Via col ventre (2007)
- Glamour Dolls #3 (2008)
- Lo stallone infuriato (2008)
- Nero familiare (2008)
- Pink'o Girls #1 (2009)
- La cura (2009)
- Ritratto di famiglia in un interno (2009)
- La superpoliziotta (2009)
- Nessuno deve sapere (2010)
- La fotografa (2010)
- Mutarno (2011)
- Fiche unite d'Italia (2011)
- I bastardi (2011)
- Collaudatrici della Catena di Pompaggio 1 (2013)
- Michelle e Giada Intimita Saffica (2013)
- Bambola del sesso (2014)
- Lesbian Orgy on Live Stage (2014)
- Michelle Ferrari (2014)
- Michelle Lick My Squirt (2014)
- SePartyAmo 1–5 (2015)
- Sofia Loves Her Friends 3 (2016)
