= The Battle Over Citizen Kane =

1996 documentary film by Thomas Lennon and Michael Epstein

- DVD cover
- Directed by: Thomas Lennon; Michael Epstein
- Written by: Thomas Lennon; Richard Ben Cramer
- Produced by: Thomas Lennon; Michael Epstein
- Cinematography: Greg Andracke; Michael Chin
- Edited by: Ken Eluto
- Music by: Brian Keane
- Production company: Lennon Documentary Group
- Distributed by: Films Transit International; Public Broadcasting Service; Warner Bros. Home Entertainment
- Release date: January 29, 1996
- Running time: 113 minutes
- Country: United States
- Language: English

The Battle Over Citizen Kane is a 1996 American documentary film directed and produced by Thomas Lennon and Michael Epstein, from a screenplay by Lennon and Richard Ben Cramer, who also narrates. It chronicles the clash between Orson Welles and William Randolph Hearst over the production and release of Welles's 1941 film Citizen Kane, which has been considered the greatest film ever made.

The Battle Over Citizen Kane was released as an episode of the eighth season of the television series American Experience, airing on PBS on January 29, 1996. It was nominated for Best Documentary Feature at the 68th Academy Awards. The documentary was the basis for the 1999 film RKO 281, which won Best Miniseries or Television Film at the 57th Golden Globe Awards.

== Synopsis ==
In Citizen Kane, Welles plays Charles Foster Kane, whose fictional life partially mirrors that of Hearst's, as well as Hearst's longtime rival, Joseph Pulitzer. However, Chicago inventor and utilities magnate Samuel Insull, Chicago Tribune publisher Robert R. McCormick, and even Welles's own life were used in creating Kane.

In 1939, based partly on the strength of his imaginative and successful New York plays, which were produced under the aegis of the Mercury Theatre (such as an adaptation of William Shakespeare's Macbeth, which featured an all-black cast and was set in the jungle), and the infamy of his October 30, 1938, radio broadcast of H. G. Wells' The War of the Worlds, which sent residents of Grovers Mill, New Jersey into a panic, Orson Welles was able to negotiate a virtually unheard-of two-picture deal with RKO Pictures, the smallest of the 'big five' major studios in this era. The deal gave him creative control under a budget limit.

The Battle Over Citizen Kane also details the lives of Orson Welles and William Randolph Hearst before Citizen Kane, and Hearst's manipulation of the heads of the four largest Hollywood studios—Columbia Pictures, Metro-Goldwyn-Mayer, Paramount Pictures, and Warner Bros.—to combine their efforts and financial strength to buy the camera negative of the film from RKO with the express purpose of destroying it, and how the film affected their lives after the release of the film.

During this period, however, William Randolph Hearst was actually millions of dollars in debt, mainly owing to his excessive spending, particularly on his continuing construction of his already sprawling mansion near San Simeon, California, which was located on a property approximately half the size of the state of Rhode Island. While married to Millicent Hearst, he kept a mistress over twenty years his junior, the actress Marion Davies. Davies had been a silent film-era star, who worked on a number of talkies, but with less success.

After the release of Citizen Kane to relatively positive critical reviews and largely indifferent popular response, Orson Welles moved on to his second project, The Magnificent Ambersons. However, after Citizen Kane did not become a money-maker, The Magnificent Ambersons was wrested from his control; this time he did not have the right of final cut. RKO re-edited the film itself and released it. William Randolph Hearst died in 1951; Orson Welles died in 1985.

== Reception ==
The Battle Over Citizen Kane was extremely well received by critics, and nominated for the 1995 Academy Award for Best Documentary Feature.

The documentary received some criticism by scholars and critics, including Jonathan Rosenbaum, for trying to tie the personalities of Welles and Hearst too closely together. "Perhaps the cardinal failing of The Battle Over Citizen Kane, a 1996 Oscar-nominated documentary, is its nearly groundless argument that Hearst and Welles had a lot of things in common," Rosenbaum wrote.

David Walsh observed, "This sort of superficial comparison—a cat has a head, a dog has a head, therefore a cat equals a dog—conceals far more than it reveals. … The documentary filmmakers fail to make any reference to this social and political context. Furthermore, because they identify success with a stable career and a steady income, they think Welles's subsequent work hardly worth considering."

Film scholar James Naremore served as a consultant for The Battle Over Citizen Kane but condemned it after seeing the finished film. While praising its use of archival footage, he dismissed the central thesis that Welles and Hearst were alike, which he described as "a tabloid trick worthy of 'News on the March'. … Among the many things it ignores or obfuscates is the fact that Welles was a political progressive who used most of the money he earned in the movies to create some of the most important works of art of the twentieth century (including the films he directed after Kane). Hearst, on the other hand, was a political reactionary who used the vast fortune he had inherited to assemble a relatively unremarkable private art collection."

"We can only hope that someday a good documentary on the making of Kane will be available", Naremore concluded.

== Home media ==
On September 25, 2001, Warner Bros. Home Entertainment released a restored version of Citizen Kane taken from the best available print (the original nitrate print was destroyed in a fire) and released with The Battle Over Citizen Kane as a two-DVD set. The documentary was subsequently included in both the DVD and Blu-ray editions of the 2011 70th anniversary re-issue of the film (although in the case of the Blu-ray release, the documentary was retained in standard definition and included as a bonus DVD).
