= 47th Writers Guild of America Awards =

47th WGA Awards
- Date: 1995
- Organized by: Writers Guild of America, East and the Writers Guild of America, West

The 47th Writers Guild of America Awards honored the best television, and film writers of 1994. Winners were announced in 1995.

== Winners and nominees ==
=== Film ===
Winners are listed first highlighted in boldface.

**Best Screenplay Written Directly for the Screen**: **Four Weddings and a Funeral, Written by Richard Curtis**; Bullets Over Broadway, Written by Woody Allen, and Douglas McGrath; Heavenly Creatures, Written by Fran Walsh, and Peter Jackson; Ed Wood, Written by Scott Alexander, and Larry Karaszewski; The Adventures of Priscilla, Queen of the Desert, Written by Stephan Elliott	**Best Screenplay Based on Material Previously Produced or Published**: **Forrest Gump, Screenplay by Eric Roth; based on the novel by Winston Groom**; Little Women, Screenplay by Robin Swicord; based on the novel by Louisa May Alcott; Quiz Show, Screenplay by Paul Attanasio; based on the book by Richard N. Goodwin; The Madness of King George, Screenplay by Alan Bennett; based on his play; The Shawshank Redemption, Screenplay by Frank Darabont; based on the short story "Rita Hayworth and Shawshank Redemption" by Stephen King

=== Television ===
**Episodic Comedy**: **"The Mango" – Seinfeld (NBC) – Larry David, and Lawrence H. Levy**; "A Mid-Winter Night's Dream" – Frasier (NBC) – Chuck Ranberg, and Anne Flett-Giordano; "A Stash from the Past" – Roseanne (CBS) – Kevin Abbott; "Don't Ask, Don't Tell" – Roseanne (CBS) – James Berg, Stan Zimmerman, and Michael Borkow; "The Hamptons" – Seinfeld (NBC) – Peter Mehlman, and Carol Leifer	**Episodic Drama**: **"Bop Gun" – Homicide: Life on the Street (NBC) – David Simon, David Mills, and Tom Fontana**; "A Many Splendored Thing" – Homicide: Life on the Street (NBC) – Noel Behn, and Tom Fontana; "Tempest in a C-Cup" – NYPD Blue (ABC) – Gardner Stern; "Pilot" – NYPD Blue (ABC) – David Milch, and Steven Bochco; "Hello, I Love You" – Northern Exposure (CBS) – Robin Green, and Mitchell Burgess
**Daytime Serials**: **General Hospital (ABC) – Claire Labine, Matt Labine, Eleanor Mancusi, Ralph Ellis, Meg Bennett, Michele Val Jean, Stephanie Braxton, Lewis Arlt, Karen Harris**; Another World (NBC) – Peggy Sloane, Victor Miller, Lorraine Broderick, Craig Carlson, Samuel D. Ratcliffe, Carolyn Culliton, Judith Pinsker, Janet Iacobuzio, Kathleen Klein, Mimi Leahey, Peter Brash, Kathleen Kennedy, Elizabeth Page, Sofia Landon Geier, Sharon Epstein; Guiding Light (CBS) – Nancy Curlee, Stephen Demorest, Patrick Mulcahey, Millee Taggart, Nancy Williams Watt, Leah Laiman, Jane Atkins, James H. Brown, Michael Conforti, Barbara Esensten, Jeannie Glynn, Lynda Myles, Roger Newman, Courtney Simon; One Life to Live (ABC) – Michael Malone, Josh Griffith, Jean Passanante, Susan Bedsow-Horgan, Christopher Whitesell, David Colson, Matthew T. Gannon, David Smilow, Becky Cole, Lloyd 'Lucky' Gold, Mike Cohen	**Original Long Form**: **Witness to the Execution (NBC) – Thomas Baum, Keith Pierce, and Priscilla Prestwidge**; Lily in Winter – Julie Moskowitz, Robert Elsele, Gary Stephens, and J. Michael Riva
**Adapted Long Form**: **A Family Torn Apart (NBC) – Matthew Bombeck**	**Children's Script**: **"The Coming Out of Heidi Leiter" – Lifestories: Families in Crisis (HBO) – Bruce Harmon**; **"Don't Stop the Music" – Ghostwriter (PBS) – Carin Greenberg Baker, and Kermit Frazier**; **"The Radish Cure" – Mrs. Piggle-Wiggle (Showtime) – Lynn Montgomery**
**Variety - Musical, Award, Tribute, Special Event**: **Tracey Takes on New York – Tony Sheehan, Dick Clement, Ian La Frenais, Stephen Nathan, and Marc Flanagan**

==== Documentary ====
**Documentary – Other Than Current Events**
- **"America and the Holocaust: Deceit and Indifference" – American Experience (PBS) – Marty Ostrow**

=== Special awards ===
Laurel Award for Screenwriting Achievement
**Charles Bennett**
Laurel Award for TV Writing Achievement
**Carl Reiner**
Valentine Davies Award
**Gary Marshall**
Morgan Cox Award
**Alfred Lewis Levitt, and Helen Levitt**
Paul Selvin Award
**Witness to the Execution – Thomas Baum, Priscilla Prestwidge, and Keith Pierce**
