= Steven Ascher =

American filmmaker

Steven Ascher is an American independent director, producer and writer. He was nominated for an Academy Award and has received the Grand Jury Prize at the Sundance Film Festival among many other awards. His book The Filmmaker’s Handbook is a bestselling text.

== Background ==
Ascher attended Wesleyan University for a year, he then went on to pursue filmmaking in New York. He worked at the MIT Film Section with documentarians Ed Pincus and Richard Leacock. He graduated from Harvard University, summa cum laude, in visual and environmental studies.

He and his wife Jeanne Jordan produced a wide variety of media through their production company, West City Films.

== Films ==
His feature documentaries include a trilogy about families in trouble, co-directed with Jeanne Jordan.

Troublesome Creek: a Midwestern is about the Jordan family and their effort to save their Iowa farm. It was released theatrically and broadcast on PBS The American Experience, the BBC premier documentary strand Storyville, ZDF Germany and many other networks around the world.

So Much So Fast tells the story of the Heywood family when son Stephen Heywood was diagnosed with ALS (Lou Gehrig’s disease) and his brother Jamie started a research group to try to find a cure. So Much So Fast was released theatrically and broadcast on PBS Frontline, BBC Storyville, ZDF Germany, Arte in France and others.

Raising Renee, part III of the trilogy, is about artist Beverly McIver and her promise to take care of her mentally disabled sister Renee when their mother died. Broadcast on HBO, AVRO Netherlands, SVT Sweden and Knowledge Network in Canada. Nominated for a 2013 Emmy for Best Arts and Culture Programming.

He and Jordan are producing Our Towns for HBO, a feature documentary based on James and Deborah Fallows book about resilient cities around the United States.

Ascher has produced, written and directed short dramas, including Seduction Theory, about psychoanalysis and family, starring Tony nominee Michael Cumpsty, which won Best Dark Comedy at Worldfest Houston. Del & Alex, starring Thomas Derrah and Polly Corman was broadcast on A&E and many European networks.

He has produced and directed several pieces for PBS Newshour, and films for the PBS series Art Close Up, which won and were nominated for Emmys. He received a Daytime Emmy nomination for an episode of the children’s series Postcards From Buster.

He has directed TV spots and branded content for major corporations, government agencies and nonprofits including Disney, Sheraton, Cisco Systems, Harvard Business School, Health Dialog, the Texas Rangers and the IRS.

He and Jordan have served as Executive Producers and advisers on many projects, including the Peabody award-winning film Deej.

== Awards ==
Among his awards are the Prix Italia, a Peabody award, an Emmy Award and an International Documentary Association Distinguished Achievement Award. He was nominated for an Oscar, two Daytime Emmy Awards, a Directors Guild of America Award and an Independent Spirit Award. His festival awards include Grand Jury Prize and Audience Award at Sundance, audience awards at the Sydney Film Festival and the San Francisco Film Festival and others. He received the Michael DeBakey Journalism Award and an Insight Award from the National Association of Film and Digital Media Artists.

He has received grants and awards from the LEF Foundation, the Artists Foundation, the Paul Robeson Fund, the Massachusetts Cultural Council, Iowa Humanities and many other state humanities and arts councils. His films are in the collections of the Museum of Modern Art, the Library of Congress, UCLA, and the Sundance Collection.

== Writing ==
He is author of the Filmmaker's Handbook (with Ed Pincus) a bestselling text and a staple of universities and film schools internationally. The Independent called it "the bible." The Boston Globe called it the "gold-standard technical reference." The fifth edition was published in 2019.

His articles have appeared various journals, including Whose Story is It Anyway, in Documentary Magazine.

== Teaching ==
Ascher has been a visiting professor at Harvard University, teaching fiction and nonfiction courses. He was twice recognized with the Thomas Hoopes prize for “excellence in the art of teaching.” He has taught filmmaking at the Massachusetts Institute of Technology and the Massachusetts College of Art and Design, and has lectured and held master classes in many countries.

He has served as a juror at Sundance and other festivals.

== Selected filmography ==
- Life and Other Anxieties
- Del and Alex
- Troublesome Creek
- So Much So Fast
- Cyberart
- Postcards from Buster
- Raising Renee
- A Woman’s Place
- Seduction Theory
- Cory Not Promised
- Our Towns
