= Jeanne Jordan =

American independent director, producer and editor

Jeanne Jordan is an American independent director, producer and editor. She was nominated for an Academy Award and has received the Grand Jury Prize at the Sundance Film Festival among many other awards.

== Background ==
Jordan graduated from the University of Iowa and began her career at Iowa Public Television. She moved to Boston to work as a freelance editor at WGBH, Boston's public television station. She went on to edit many programs for WGBH and was the series producer of the children's series Postcards from Buster.

She and her husband Steven Ascher produce a wide variety of media through their production company, West City Films.

== Films ==
Her feature documentaries include a trilogy about families in trouble, co-directed with Steven Ascher.

Troublesome Creek: a Midwestern is about the Jordan family and their effort to save their Iowa farm. It was released theatrically and broadcast on PBS The American Experience, the BBC premier documentary strand Storyville, ZDF Germany and many other networks around the world.

So Much So Fast tells the story of the Heywood family when son Stephen Heywood was diagnosed with ALS (Lou Gehrig's disease) and his brother Jamie started a research group to try to find a cure. So Much So Fast was released theatrically and broadcast on PBS Frontline, BBC Storyville, ZDF Germany, Arte in France and others.

Raising Renee, part III of the trilogy, is about artist Beverly McIver and her promise to take care of her mentally disabled sister Renee when their mother died. Broadcast on HBO, AVRO Netherlands, SVT Sweden and Knowledge Network in Canada. Nominated for a 2013 Emmy for Outstanding Arts and Culture Programming.

She and Ascher are producing Our Towns for HBO, a feature documentary based on James and Deborah Fallows book about resilient cities around the United States.

Jordan was Series Producer of the PBS children's series Postcards from Buster for two seasons, producing a new, international version of the show, nominated for the Outstanding Children's Series Emmy both years.

Jordan edited two films of the groundbreaking civil rights series Eyes on the Prize which won an Emmy Award and the DuPont Columbia Award, and films for American Experience, including, Amelia Earhart and The Wright Stuff. Her dramatic feature work includes films for American Playhouse, including Noon Wine, Lemon Sky and the Emmy-winning series Concealed Enemies on the trials of Alger Hiss. She edited the bilingual feature, Blue Diner which won the prestigious ALMA award. She produced and edited the short drama Seduction Theory, about psychoanalysis and family, starring Tony nominee Michael Cumpsty, which won Best Dark Comedy at Worldfest Houston.

Jordan and Orlando Bagwell produced Running With Jesse, a chronicle of Jesse Jackson's 1988 presidential run for Frontline, which Jordan also edited. She has produced and edited several pieces for The PBS Newshour and films for the PBS series Art Close Up, which won and were nominated for Emmys.

She and Ascher have served as Executive Producers and advisers on many projects, including the Peabody award-winning film Deej.

=== Selected filmography ===
- Eyes on the Prize
- Running with Jesse
- Troublesome Creek
- So Much So Fast
- Postcards from Buster
- Raising Renee
- Seduction Theory
- A Woman’s Place
- Cory Not Promised
- Our Towns

== Academics and teaching ==
Jordan has twice been a fellow at the Radcliffe Institute for Advanced Study at Harvard. She has taught filmmaking at Harvard and lectured and held master classes in several countries

== Awards ==
Among her awards are the Prix Italia, a Peabody award, an Emmy Award and an International Documentary Association Distinguished Achievement Award. She was nominated for an Oscar, two Daytime Emmy Awards, a Directors Guild of America Award and an Independent Spirit Award. Her festival awards include Grand Jury Prize and Audience Award at Sundance, audience awards at the Sydney Film Festival and the San Francisco Film Festival and others. She received the Michael DeBakey Journalism Award and an Insight Award from the National Association of Film and Digital Media Artists.

She has received grants and awards from the LEF Foundation, the Artists Foundation, the Paul Robeson Fund, the Massachusetts Cultural Council, Iowa Humanities and many other state humanities and arts councils. Her films are in the collections of the Museum of Modern Art, the Library of Congress, UCLA, and the Sundance Collection.
