= D-Day Remembered =

1994 film

- Directed by: Charles Guggenheim
- Written by: Charles Guggenheim
- Produced by: Charles Guggenheim
- Narrated by: David McCullough
- Edited by: Joseph Wiedenmayer
- Distributed by: Direct Cinema Limited
- Release date: May 25, 1994
- Running time: 54 minutes
- Country: United States
- Language: English

D-Day Remembered is a 1994 American documentary film directed by Charles Guggenheim for The National WWII Museum. It aired as an episode of the PBS series American Experience. It was nominated for an Academy Award for Best Documentary Feature.
