= David Grubin =

American documentary filmmaker (born 1944)

- Born: Washington, DC
- Occupation: Documentarian
- Employer: David Grubin Productions
- Spouse: Joan Grubin
- Website: http://www.grubin.com/

David Grubin (born 1944) is an American documentary filmmaker.

== Career ==
Grubin is best known for producing television documentaries for PBS, notably American Experience and Healing And The Mind with Bill Moyers. His work has won two Alfred I. Dupont awards, two Peabody Awards, five Writer's Guild prizes, and four Primetime Emmys.

A member of the executive committee of the Society of American Historians, Grubin has received a Guggenheim Fellowship, has been a Montgomery Fellow at Dartmouth College, and is the recipient of an honorary doctorate from his alma mater, Hamilton College. He is a member of the Writers Guild and Directors Guild, and is a former chairman of the board of directors of The Film Forum.

His independent feature film, Downtown Express, was selected for the Woodstock Film Festival, FilmColumbia Festival, and opening night at the Cinema Arts Festival Houston.

He teaches documentary filmmaking at Columbia University's Graduate Film Program.

== Personal life ==
Grubin is married to the artist Joan Grubin. He lives in New York City.

== Selected filmography ==
- The Great Air Race of 1924 (1989)
- LBJ (1991)
- FDR (1994)
- T.R.: The Story of Theodore Roosevelt (1996)
- Truman (1997)
- America 1900 (1998)
- Napoleon (2000 documentary) (2000) DeVillier Donegan Enterprises Public Broadcasting Service|PBS
- Money and Power TV special on Showtime (TV network) (2001)
- Abraham and Mary Lincoln: A House Divided (2001)
- The Secret Life of the Brain (2002) PBS
- Young Dr. Freud
- RFK (2004)
- Marie Antoinette: A Film by David Grubin (2005)
- The Jewish Americans (2008)
- The Trials of J. Robert Oppenheimer (2009)
- The Buddha (2010)
- Downtown Express (2011)
- Havana, Havana! (2012)
- Language Matters with Bob Holman (2015)
- Tesla (2016)
