= Miss America (film) =

- Opening titles
- Directed by: Lisa Ades
- Story by: Michelle Ferrari
- Produced by: Lisa Ades; Lesli Klainberg
- Starring: Julia Alvarez; Margaret Cho; William Goldman; Isaac Mizrahi; Kathy Peiss; Tricia Rose; Gloria Steinem; Bess Myerson; Lee Meriwether; Mary Ann Mobley; Katherine Shindle
- Narrated by: Cherry Jones
- Cinematography: Buddy Squires; Peter Nelson
- Edited by: Toby Shimin
- Music by: Douglas J. Cuomo
- Production companies: CLIO, Inc.; Orchard Films; Visualizing History; WGBH
- Distributed by: Women Make Movies; PBS (WGBH)
- Release date: January 27, 2002 (PBS)
- Running time: 96 Minutes
- Country: United States
- Language: English

Miss America is a 2002 American documentary film directed by Lisa Ades that chronicles the Miss America pageant from its beginnings in 1921 through 1998.

The film was released as an episode of American Experience season 14 on January 27, 2002.

== Synopsis ==
The documentary describes the Miss America Pageant as the national example of smaller beauty pageants held by various groups throughout the 1920s in the United States during a period of fascination with the concept of beauty. It details the beginnings of the pageant in Atlantic City, New Jersey and how the bathing suit competition was central to the success of the pageant, drawing 100,000 spectators to the beach. Leonard Horn states that this led advertisers to invest in the pageant as well as to use women in their ads to increase sales. The documentary explains how the contestants were able to leverage their participation into careers in entertainment in Hollywood and Vaudeville, as well as lucrative speaking engagements.

It covers protests in both the 1920s and later on in the 1960s, both of which resulted from the perception of objectification of women. It also covers numerous scandals that plagued the pageant, which began in 1935, when a nude statue was erected of winner Henrietta Leaver in Pittsburgh. The pageant hired Lenore Slaughter to create rules to prevent future scandal. She added a minimum age of eighteen, a talent competition, chaperones for the contestants upon arrival in Atlantic City, and a 1 AM curfew, with additional behavioral requirements. Vicki Gold Levi explains that these changes brought an element of respectability to draw women as participants. The documentary then notes that Slaughter later added a clause requiring all contestants be white and in good health. Sarah Banet-Weiser states that whiteness in the United States has been perceived as standard, and that the pageant was no different.

It covers the pageant's involvement in selling war bonds so they could continue to operate during World War II, and notes how cosmetics weren't rationed. Following the war, Slaughter instituted scholarships. As the U.S. media began printing details of the Holocaust, the pageant crowned the first Jewish Miss America, Bess Myerson. She had been told she would need to change her name if she won, which she refused to do and called out Slaughter on the antisemitism. Unlike other winners, she was not granted sponsorship opportunities. After six months, she informed the pageant she would be unavailable to them as she agreed to speaking engagements for the Anti-Defamation League.

It notes how the swimsuit competition changed with the advent of rubberized bathing suits. Yolande Betbeze Fox described it as awkward, and when she was informed after winning that they expected her to parade around a department store in winter in a bathing suit, she told them that wasn't her idea of Miss America, nor was it why she entered the pageant. Ric Ferentz notes that Betbeze Fox refused Catalina's demand saying that she was not a pin-up model. Afterward, Catalina launched Miss USA and Miss Universe.

From there, it goes on to cover the September 11, 1954 competition, the first televised crowning broadcast on ABC. It notes how this changed the way the pageant was presented, marked by the hiring of Bert Parks as the master of ceremonies. The theme song was introduced the same year. Television resulted in increased sponsorship which made more funds available for scholarships, with US$200,000 (equivalent to US$2,231,834 in 2025) available in 1958.

It also covers how the pageant was at odds with cultural movements in the 1960s, from the sexual revolution to the burgeoning civil rights and gay liberation movements, as well as the fact that pageant contestants traveled alongside the USO in the Vietnam War, despite widespread opposition to U.S. involvement. It notes Robin Morgan's protest in 1968, as well as the inaugural Miss Black America pageant taking place the same night at the Ritz-Carlton, with its winner, Saundra Williams, stating that Miss America didn't represent all American women. Following the protests, Pepsi-Cola withdrew from the pageant as a sponsor, saying that the pageant did not represent the change in American values.

It notes how Rebecca King Dreman forced the pageant to become political with her support of legalized abortion, and how despite attempts to modernize its image, the pageant continued to lose viewership. There is discussion of the type of woman that the pageant elevated to fame, noting that the first non-white contestant was Cheryl Browne, Miss Iowa, in 1970. Only ten other contestants over a period of ten years were Black, with only Lencola Sullivan finishing in the top five. The first Black woman crowned as Miss America was Vanessa Williams in 1983. The documentary covers the scandal with the nude pictures printed in Penthouse without Williams's consent and how the pageant rescinded her title but not her scholarship in requiring her to resign, giving her crown to Suzette Charles. The pageant subsequently drew up new rules, including one that banned transgender women from the competition. It also notes that in 1989, the pageant added a rule requiring contestants to participate in service projects.

The documentary ends with footage from the 1998 competition, including backstage scenes of the contestants gathered in their gowns with their heads bowed as one of the organizers leads a Christian prayer. There is discussion of why women might choose to compete, how the pageant defines women, and whether the youngest American generation even aspires to participate in such pageants. Banet-Weiser states that the pageant does not fit into a good or bad dichotomy.

== Cast ==
In alphabetical order:

- Kimberly Aiken Cockerham, Miss America 1994
- Julia Alvarez, commentator
- Sarah Banet-Weiser, commentator
- Marian Bergeron, Miss America 1933
- Yolande Betbeze Fox, Miss America 1951
- Margaret Cho, commentator
- Ric Ferentz, Pageant historian
- Vicki Gold Levi, Atlantic City historian
- William Goldman, commentator
- Leonard Horn, former Miss America CEO
- Cherry Jones, as the narrator
- Rebecca King Dreman, Miss America 1974
- Lee Meriwether, Miss America 1955
- Isaac Mizrahi, commentator
- Mary Ann Mobley, Miss America 1959
- Robin Morgan, commentator
- Bess Myerson, Miss America 1945
- Kathy Peiss, commentator
- Tricia Rose, commentator
- Katherine Shindle, Miss America 1998
- Gloria Steinem, commentator
- Lencola Sullivan, Miss Arkansas 1980

== Production ==
Miss America was directed and produced by Lisa Ades, and co-produced by Lesli Klainberg. The screenplay was written by Michelle Ferrari. Toby Shimin edited the film, with Peter Nelson and Buddy Squires handling cinematography. The music was composed by Douglas J. Cuomo. The documentary also includes the pageant's original theme song, composed by Bernie Wayne.

Production was approved by the Miss America organization, which permitted the crew to film the 1998 pageant in addition to providing access to archival footage. The National Endowment for the Humanities provided grants to Clio, which helped to fund the film.

== Release ==
Miss America aired on PBS on January 27, 2002. It competed for the Grand Jury Prize for Documentaries at the 2002 Sundance Film Festival. There was some concern regarding the documentary's selection for Sundance in light of the executive producer, Lola Van Wagenen, being Robert Redford's ex-wife, though Van Wagenen stated that the copy sent to Sundance had no credits attached.

It screened at South by Southwest Film Festival in March 2002, which was also its premiere for that region. It also screened as one of sixty-seven competition films at the Full Frame Documentary Film Festival in April 2002, where it was in consideration for the second annual MTV News Docs Prize. It also screened at Sheffield DocFest in October 2002, and at the November 2002 International Documentary Film Festival Amsterdam.

On June 20, 2003, Miss America screened at the Mary Pickford Theater as part of a tribute to women's history.

== Critical reception ==
John Curran, writing for the Associated Press, found the film to be "lively" and "refreshingly evenhanded." He noted that the documentary doesn't deride the pageant while covering its darker historical moments. Jonathan Storm, writing for The Philadelphia Inquirer, also noted that the documentary is all-encompassing in its coverage of the pageant, calling it "striking." He stated that it is "beautifully edited," saying that it would have done just as well without the "outside chatter."

Jill Vejnoska, writing for Cox News Service, enjoyed the documentary but found the lack of dating on some of the archival footage to be "frustrating." She also noted that the documentary is "thorough" in its examination of the pageant. Hal Boedeker, reviewing for the Tribune News Service was impressed with the pace and coverage, particularly with the profiles of past winners it includes. Boedeker was less enthused about the non-pageant commentators such as Steinem, Cho, and Mizrahi, and felt that the end of the documentary was rushed.

M. Alison Kibler, writing for The Journal of American History, stated that the documentary conveyed the contrast of the values of the Miss America pageant and the lived experiences of American women. Kibler also noted that the documentary's construction, including anecdotes for their humorous content that strayed from what Kibler perceived as the focus of the film, made it less useful for inclusion in history courses.

Laura Fries, reviewing for Variety, was impressed with the technical crew, as well as the way that Ades used popular music from various eras throughout the film. Regarding the interviews, Fries stated that they "ran the gamut" with respect to being relevant to the subject, and called the documentary "equal parts serious and satirical." A brief review in The Tampa Tribune noted that the documentary examined how the expectant role of women in the United States has changed. The reviewer particularly appreciated commentary provided in the film by Gold Levi.

Ray Richmond, reviewing for The Hollywood Reporter, was impressed with how the documentary handled the period values and the values of the pageant as each set changed, as well as the cultural impact of the pageant. Richmond appreciated the archival material included, as well as the various interviews, though Richmond expressed disappointment that an interview with Vanessa Williams was not included. Tim Merrill of Film Threat called Williams's absence "conspicuous" but thoroughly enjoyed the film.

Anne Lewis, reviewing for The Austin Chronicle, acknowledged the strength of the documentary, noting that viewers would come away from watching it with a "multidimensional understanding" of the pageant.
