= A Midwife's Tale (documentary) =

"A Midwife's Tale" is a 1997 documentary film, based on the book A Midwife's Tale. It aired as part of the PBS series The American Experience. The author of the book, Laurel Thatcher Ulrich, served as a consultant, script collaborator, and narrator for the film. It was directed by Richard P. Rogers, and produced by Laurie Kahn-Leavitt. Actress Kaiulani Lee played Martha Ballard. Lee is a direct descendant of the Sewall family of Maine, members of Ballard's community.

Kahn-Leavitt described the film as being "structured like a detective story".

== Background ==
Kahn-Leavitt herself read A Midwife's Tale and decided that it would make a potential film.

It was funded in part by the National Endowment for the Humanities. When filming the series, details were given close attention. The production crew chose King's Landing Historical Settlement in Fredericton in New Brunswick, and Historic Richmond Town on Staten Island to capture Maine's three seasons: "black flies, snow and mud." The actors wore mud-soaked shoes below historically-accurate costumes, and replicas were made of the hand sewn booklets that formed the diary, so that Lee could write in them. The music in the film, played by the ensemble Orison, included shape note singing by the Word of Mouth Chorus.

The film's development took a total of five years.

Filming began in 1995. Kahn-Leavitt stated that the crew "broke all the rules of low-budget, independent film making."

The actor who played Ballard stated that she "became unbelievably close to" Ballard and stated that she "adored her." Lynn Ascrizzi of the Morning Sentinel wrote that "Lee is impressed with Ballard's strong moral sense."

There were about 100 people in the cast of the documentary.

== Content ==
The sole dialog is made up of excerpts from the diary.

Steven Linan of the Los Angeles Times stated that the content shows "everyday existence after the American Revolution."

== Release ==
The opening of the film happened in 1997 at the Railroad Square Cinema in Waterville, Maine. That year, it played in the Hamptons International Film Festival. It was to air on PBS on January 19, 1998.

== Reception ==
Film critic Walter Goodman wrote that overall the documentary is "conscientious, often moving".

Gail Pennington, in the St. Louis Post-Dispatch, wrote that she would award the Pulitzer Prize to the documentary if she had the power to do so.

Anne Bendheim of the Central New Jersey Home News gave a positive review and wrote that "the performances are riveting and convincing and revealing."

== See also ==
- American Experience season 10
