= G. W. Martin =

G. W. Martin may refer to:

- George Washington Martin II (1876–1948), American lawyer
- George Willard Martin (1886–1971), American mycologist
