= Capasso =

Capasso is an Italian surname. Notable people with the surname include:

- Carl Andrew Capasso (1945–2001), American fraudster
- Federico Capasso (born 1949), American physicist
- Manuel Capasso (born 1996), Argentine footballer
- Michael Capasso (born 1960), American opera director
