= Vicki Gold Levi =

American author

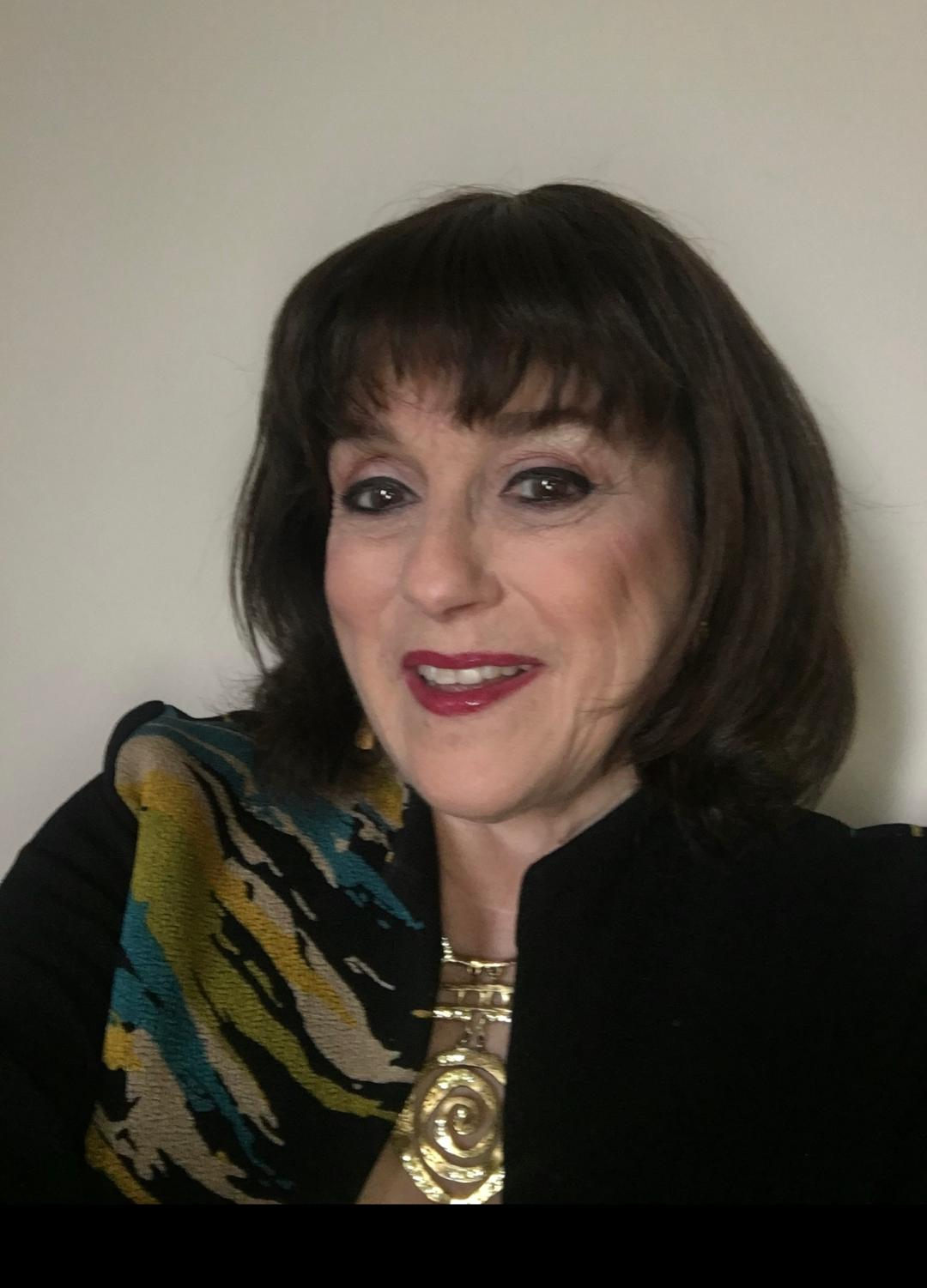
- Born: Victory Ellen Gold; September 16, 1941 (age 85); Atlantic City, New Jersey, U.S.
- Occupations: Historical consultant, historian, curator, author, photo editor, researcher
- Years active: 1946–present
- Known for: Historical consultant on the television series Boardwalk Empire

Vicki Gold Levi (born September 16, 1941) is an American author, curator, historical consultant and collector. She is best known as an Atlantic City, New Jersey historian and a consultant on the HBO television series Boardwalk Empire, and the 1997 musical Steel Pier.

== Early life ==
Vicki Gold Levi was born and raised in Atlantic City, New Jersey to parents Albert and Beverly Gold. Her father who went by the name Al, photographed the first Miss America Pageant in 1921 and became the city's first chief photographer in 1939.

In 1946, Levi was the page to the first Jewish Miss America Bess Myerson. In that same year at age 5, Levi had her own local radio show on WMID called, "Views By Vicki" where she interviewed children her own age. She also spent time and was photographed with singer and actor Frank Sinatra.

== Career ==
In 1985, Levi co-founded the Atlantic City Historical Museum along with Florence Miller and Anthony Kutschera. The museum contains over 150 years of the city's history. It was first located at Garden Pier on the Boardwalk until 2014 when the museum closed. In 2019, the artifacts were relocated to the lobby of the Jim Whelan Boardwalk Hall and is now called Atlantic City Experience .

Levi was credited as an historical consultant on the 2010 HBO television series, "Boardwalk Empire". She also was a consultant on the films Beaches in 1988, Atlantic City in 1980 and for the Broadway musical, Steel Pier.

Levi is the sponsor of Dionne Warwick's induction plaque for The Atlantic City Walk of Fame Presented by The National R&B Music Society. The induction was held on April 26, 2024.

Levi did the forward for the book, "Atlantic City Reader", The Rise and Decline of an American Resort, by Louis J. Parascandola, and John Parascandola. The book was released on, May 12, 2026.

On October 12, 2026, Levi presented, "Through The Lens of History" Vicki Gold Levi... Preserving The Stories Behind Atlantic City's Golden Age, at Marjorie & Lewis Katz JCC in Margate, New Jersey.

=== Author ===
In 1979, Levi's book entitled, "Atlantic City: 125 Years of Ocean Madness" 1st edition was published by Clarkson Porter.

In 1982, Levi co-authored, "Live & Be Well: A Celebration of Yiddish Culture In America" with writer Richard F Shepard.

Levi co-authored three books with design writer Steven Heller, "You Must Have Been a Beautiful Baby: Baby Pictures of the Stars" in 1992, "Cuba Style: Graphics from the Golden Age of Design" in 2002 and "Times Square Style: Graphics from the Golden Age of Broadway" in 2004.

=== Television appearances ===
In 1979, Levi appeared four times as a guest on season 18 of The Merv Griffin Show, when Griffin hosted his show for a week from Atlantic City, New Jersey.

- November 5th -Levi appeared on the show with, singers Glen Campbell, Ethel Merman and Gloria Gaynor.
- November 6th - Levi along with singer & actress Grace Jones, opera singer Robert Merrill, country singer Clint Holmes, and comedian Nancy Parker all appeared as guests on this episode.
- November 7th - Levi appeared as a guest along with actress Phyllis Newman, singer Debby Boone, and comedian Henry Youngman.
- November 9th - Levi, writer Ernest Chambers, singer Stephanie Mills and singer/dancer/actress Chita Rivera appeared on Griffin's last show of the week from Atlantic City.

In 2010, Levi appeared on the HBO promotional film, "Boardwalk Empire: Atlantic City: The Original Sin" as a commentator.

In 2015, Levi appeared on Anthony Bourdain television show, "New Jersey Episode Parts Unknown". Levi and Bourdain dined at the Knife and Fork Inn restaurant in Atlantic City, NJ.

In 2020, Levi was a featured commentator on the PBS series "UNLADYLIKE2020" on the episode entitled, "Sonora Webster Carver".

Levi also appeared in the PBS documentary entitled, "There She Is Miss America", and a Miss America Special on VH-1: Behind The Scenes.

On May 14, 2025, Levi was featured on season 2025 episode No.5 NJ PBS, Here's The Story: Miss Atlantic City. A documentary about the life and legacy of Vicki Gold Levi. Here's The Story: Miss Atlantic City was produced and directed by Steve Rogers.

== Personal life ==
Levi is married to clinical psychologist Dr. Alexander Levi. They have one son and three grandchildren. Levi and her husband reside in New York, New York.

Levi is a board trustee on the Historic Organ Restoration Committee in Atlantic City, New Jersey.
