= American Experience season 15 =

American Experience
- Season 15
- No. of episodes: 13

Release
- Original network: PBS
- Original release: November 11, 2002 – July 14, 2003

Season chronology
- ← Previous; Season 14 Next → Season 16

Season fifteen of the television program American Experience originally aired on the PBS network in the United States on November 11, 2002 and concluded on July 14, 2003. The season contained 13 new episodes and began with the first part of the film Jimmy Carter.

== Episodes ==
No. overall	No. in season	Title	Directed by	Categories	Original release date
173	1	"Jimmy Carter (Part 1)"	Adriana Bosch	Biographies, Politics, Presidents	November 11, 2002
174	2	"Jimmy Carter (Part 2)"	Adriana Bosch	Biographies, Politics, Presidents	November 12, 2002
175	3	"Chicago: City of the Century (Part 1)"	Austin Hoyt	Popular Culture	January 13, 2003
Part 1: "Mudhole to Metropolis"
176	4	"Chicago: City of the Century (Part 2)"	Austin Hoyt	Popular Culture	January 14, 2003
Part 2: "The Revolution Has Begun"
177	5	"Chicago: City of the Century (Part 3)"	Austin Hoyt	Popular Culture	January 15, 2003
Part 3: "Battle for Chicago"
178	6	"The Murder of Emmett Till"	Stanley Nelson	Civil Rights, Politics	January 20, 2003
179	7	"The Transcontinental Railroad"	Michael Chin & Mark Zwonitzer	Technology, The American West	January 27, 2003
180	8	"Partners of the Heart"	Andrea Kalin	Biographies, Civil Rights, Technology	February 10, 2003
181	9	"The Pill"	Chana Gazit	Popular Culture, Technology	February 24, 2003
182	10	"Daughter from Danang"	Gail Dolgin & Vicente Franco	Biographies, War	April 7, 2003
183	11	"Seabiscuit"	Stephen Ives	Biographies, Popular Culture	April 21, 2003
184	12	"Bataan Rescue"	Peter Jones	War	July 7, 2003
185	13	"Murder at Harvard"	Eric Stange	Popular Culture	July 14, 2003
