= American Experience season 11 =

American Experience
- Season 11
- No. of episodes: 10

Release
- Original network: PBS
- Original release: November 18, 1998 – May 24, 1999

Season chronology
- ← Previous; Season 10 Next → Season 12

Season eleven of the television program American Experience originally aired on the PBS network in the United States on November 18, 1998 and concluded on May 24, 1999. This is the eleventh season to feature David McCullough as the host, and the winner of the Primetime Emmy Awards. The season contained ten new episodes and began with all four parts of the film America 1900.

== Episodes ==
* Denotes multiple chapters that aired on the same date and share the same episode number

No. overall	No. in season	Title	Directed by	Categories	Original release date
122	1*	"America 1900 (Parts 1–4)"	David Grubin	Politics, Popular Culture, Technology	November 18, 1998
Part 1: "Winter, Spirit of the Age"; Part 2: "Spring, Change Is In the Air"; Part 3: "Summer, A Great Civilized Power"; Part 4: "Fall, Anything Seemed Possible"
123	2	"Race for the Superbomb"	Thomas Ott	Technology, War	January 11, 1999
124	3	"Hoover Dam"	Stephen Stept	Technology, The American West	January 18, 1999
125	4	"Alone on the Ice"	Nancy Porter	Biographies, Technology, The Natural Environment	February 8, 1999
126	5	"Rescue at Sea"	Ben Loeterman	Technology	February 15, 1999
127	6	"Meltdown at Three Mile Island"	Chana Gazit	Technology	February 22, 1999
128	7	"Lost in the Grand Canyon"	Mark Davis	Biographies, The American West, The Natural Environment	April 5, 1999
129	8	"MacArthur (Part 1)"	Sarah Holt & Austin Hoyt	Biographies, War	May 17, 1999
Part 1: "Destiny"
130	9	"MacArthur (Part 2)"	Sarah Holt & Austin Hoyt	Biographies, War	May 18, 1999
Part 2: "The Politics of War"
131	10	"Fly Girls"	Laurel Ladevich	Biographies, Technology, War	May 24, 1999
