= A Midwife's Tale =

1990 book by Laurel Thatcher Ulrich

A Midwife's Tale: The Life of Martha Ballard Based on her Diary, 1785–1812 is a 1989 book edited by Laurel Thatcher Ulrich. It includes portions of the diary of Martha Ballard. It was published by Knopf Books.

== Background ==
For many years, Martha Ballard's diary was not considered to be of scholarly interest since it was generally dismissed as repetitive and ordinary. However, historian Laurel Thatcher Ulrich saw potential in the diary, realizing how rare Ballard's first-hand account was after having researched a previous book on women in early New England. After eight years of research, Ulrich produced A Midwife's Tale: The Life of Martha Ballard based on her diary, 1785–1812. Each chapter in A Midwife's Tale represents one aspect of the life of a woman in the late 18th century. The overriding theme is the nature of women's work in the context and community. Ulrich stated that:

When I finally was able to connect Martha's work to her world, I could begin to create stories.

Supporting documents construct Ulrich's interpretation of terse and circumspect diary entries, dealing with medical practice and the prevalence of violence and crime. In "A Midwife’s Tale", Ulrich highlights ten key entries from Martha's diary. Ulrich places these entries in a historical context, elevating a seemingly-ordinary woman's life into a key figure of Kennebec.

The editor took eight years to compile the work.

== Content ==
Diary excerpts make up initial parts of each chapter. The author adds her commentary after the excerpts, and she chose not to publish the diary in full.

An appendix lists medicines made from plants.

=== Summary ===
The first entry in A Midwife's Tale puts midwifery in a broader medical context within the Kennebec region, beginning to put Ballard's diary in context of other primary sources at the time. This chapter establishes the relationship between doctors and midwives during this time period. Ulrich also introduces the concept of “social medicine” in this chapter, referring to the sharing of information among midwives and doctors. This is evident in midwife manuals that Ulrich cites.

Section 2 shows the separate economy among women in Hallowell. Ulrich describes this economy as facilitated by the 'social webs' of production and consumption.

Section 3 follows an important rape trial in Hallowell. A Mrs. Foster accused Judge North of raping her while her husband was away. Historians are able to contrast Martha's account of the trial with Henry Sewall's account. Henry Sewall opposed the Fosters' religious beliefs whereas Martha Ballard felt sympathetic toward the Fosters because others judged them for their religious beliefs.

Section 4 is concerned with the three Ballard family marriages which occurred in 1792, in which Ulrich explores the understanding of marriage and sex at this time. The mid-eighteenth century is seen as a turning point in history when children began only then to choose their own partners and Ballard's diary entries support this. It seems as though all the Ballard marriages in 1792 were courtships chosen by the children as opposed to arrangements proposed for economic benefits. Additionally, there is pre-marital sex.

Section 5 details the fifty-three deliveries of babies Ballard performed in 1793. Ulrich emphasizes that an average of one baby a week seems easy, but Martha often sat for weeks doing nothing, and for others, facing multiple births in a short time during poor weather.

1796, the focus of section 6, is a physically taxing year for Ballard and her husband. She is traveling to deliver babies in flea-infested cabins while her husband works in swamps swarming with mosquitos. Their children also have some health issues that year. In November, her husband Ephraim is robbed at musket point and all of his instruments were stolen at the outset of a planned extended surveying journey - canceling the trip, he returned five days later. On the same day, consequently (or around the same time), Martha delivered her 600th baby, a milestone. Ephraim's work continues to be difficult. Martha prays for strength to continue faring through her difficult and laborious life.

Section 7 follows the death and autopsy of John Davis, the son of John Vassall Davis in Kennebec. Ulrich fleshes out the significance of Martha Ballard's presence at the autopsy. Ulrich discusses that in 1820, a Harvard Medical School professor published a treatise stating that women should no longer be midwives as they are not educated enough to practice medicine.

Section 8 tracks Martha's entries while her husband, Ephraim Ballard, is in jail for debt. During this time, Martha's son, Jonathan, takes over Martha and Ephraim's house. These entries highlight Martha and Jonathan's rocky relationship. Additionally, Martha experiences a pseudo-widowhood during this time, acknowledging Ephraim's role in the household that now must be filled by her son. This entry gives important information regarding jail time in Kennebec, as Ephraim is allowed to continue working during the day and only has to sleep at the jail at night. There is flexibility regarding cases of debt.

Section 9 is centered around a mass murder that occurred in Hallowell. James Purrinton, one of Martha's neighbors, murdered his wife and all of his children but one, who escaped. Martha's entry adds another viewpoint on this historic event. Ulrich writes, “The economy of Martha’s telling contrasts with the more self-conscious narrative published (and probably composed) by Peter Edes, editor of Augusta’s Kennebec Gazette.”

In Section 10, Ulrich discusses the importance of women in field agriculture, as characterized by Martha's garden and her records of the flowers and vegetables she planted in her time. As Martha grows older, her diary recounts fewer births. Ulrich hypothesizes that this decrease in births is due to another midwife taking over Ballard's work.

== Reception ==
The book received a positive critical response and was praised for its insight into the lives of 18th-century women and life in early New England.

Carl N. Degler, in The New York Times, wrote that with the book one can "vicariously experience" the time period that Ballard lived in.

Florence King, in the Washington Post, wrote that the author contributed "her own exquisite sensitivity and scholarly insight".

Michael A. Fargo, in a review published in the Journal Tribune, wrote that the book "should be mandatory reading" for people learning about the history of women in the United States and the region as well as those learning about the state and people in the medical fields.

In 1991, A Midwife's Tale received the Pulitzer Prize, the Bancroft Prize, the John H. Dunning Prize, the Joan Kelly Memorial Prize in Women's History, the Berkshire Conference of Women Historians Book Prize, the Society for Historians of the Early Republic Book Prize, the William Henry Welch Medal of the American Association for the History of Medicine, and the New England Historical Association Award.

== PBS Documentary ==
In 1997, the PBS series The American Experience aired "A Midwife's Tale". This documentary film was based upon Ulrich’s book, and Ulrich served as a consultant, script collaborator, and narrator for the film. It was directed by Richard P. Rogers, and produced by Laurie Kahn-Leavitt. Actress Kaiulani Lee played Martha Ballard. It was funded in part by the National Endowment for the Humanities.

== Legacy ==
The book became a landmark in women's labor history since it provides scholars with rich insights into the life of a lay American rural healer around 1800. It rests not on the observations of outsiders, but on the words of the woman herself. At first glance, Ballard's encoded, repetitive, and quotidian diary often appears trivial, but as Ulrich found, "it is in the very dailiness, the exhaustive, repetitious dailiness, that the real power of Martha Ballard's book lies... For her, living was to be measured in doing." By knitting together "ordinary" sources to produce a meaningful, extraordinary socio-cultural narrative, Ulrich shows how a skilled practitioner functioned within the interstices of the private and public spheres. The book, divided into 10 sections, takes the "dailiness" of Ballard's diary and transforms it into a rich historical source.

A Midwife's Tale was not only methodologically influential for scholars, but also theoretically important. By showing clearly the economic contributions that midwives made to their households and local communities, and demonstrating the organizational skill of multitasking as a source of female empowerment, the book revises the understanding of prescribed gender roles. While A Midwife's Tale is obviously limited in terms of time (1785–1812) and place (rural Maine), it has attracted sustained attention of historians—especially those interested in gender relations and wage-earning, the economic value of domestic labor, and women's work before industrialization. Ulrich invokes these contributions to historical knowledge in a 2009 interview, stating, “I don’t think anonymous people need to be included in the historical record just because of fairness or justice. Studying them more carefully makes for more accurate history,” highlighting the potential for work like hers on historically non-dominant voices. The book has also been taught as an exemplar of archival and historical work and explored in conjunction with Ulrich's own life as a historian, writer, and activist.
