= Sarah M. S. Pearsall =

American historian

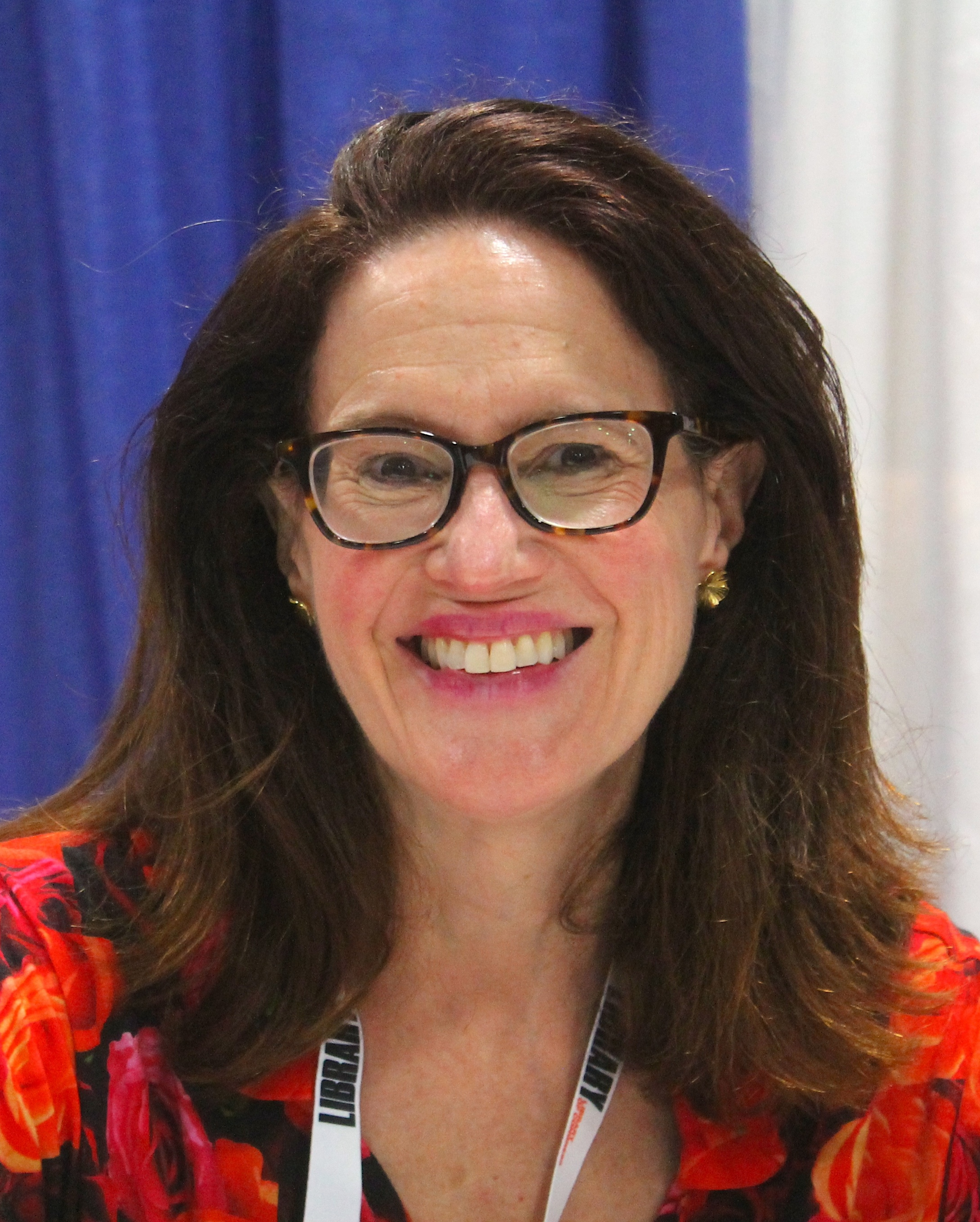
- Pearsall at the 2026 National Book Festival

Academic background
- Education: Harvard University
- Doctoral advisor: Laurel Thatcher Ulrich

Academic work
- Discipline: History of North America
- Institutions: Johns Hopkins University

Sarah Marjorie Savage Pearsall is an American historian specialized in the history of North America between c. 1500 and c. 1800.

She is a professor and director of undergraduate studies at the Johns Hopkins University Zanvyl Krieger School of Arts and Sciences.

== Life ==
Pearsall completed a Ph.D. at Harvard University. Her 2001 dissertation was titled After All These Revolutions: Epistolary Identities in an Atlantic World, 1760-1815. Her doctoral advisor was Laurel Thatcher Ulrich.

Pearsall is a fellow of the Royal Historical Society. She was co-editor of The Historical Journal.

== Selected works ==
- Pearsall, Sarah M. S. (2008). Atlantic Families: Lives and Letters in the Later Eighteenth Century. Oxford University Press. ISBN 978-0-19-953299-5.
- Pearsall, Sarah M. S. (2019). Polygamy: An Early American History. Yale University Press. ISBN 978-0-300-22684-3.
- Pearsall, Sarah M. S. (2022). Polygamy: A Very Short Introduction. Oxford University Press. ISBN 978-0-19-753317-8.
- Freedom Round the Globe: A World History of the American Revolution, Knopf Doubleday, 2026
