= Kaiulani Lee =

Actor

Kaiulani Lee (born 1950) is an American actress. She is best known for her portrayal of Rachel Carson in both the film and stage version of A Sense of Wonder, which she also wrote.

== Career ==
Lee is also a well-known stage, television, and film actress. She was nominated for a Drama Desk Award for Outstanding Featured Actress in a Play for Kennedy's Children. She received an Obie Award for Best Performance by an Actress for Safe House.

Her film and television work includes The World According to Garp, Cujo, Before and After, A Bird of the Air, Stephanie Daley, The Waltons, Law & Order, amongst others. She starred as Martha Ballard in PBS's A Midwife's Tale.

== Filmography ==
=== Film ===
Kaiulani Lee film credits
Year	Title	Role
1979	The Seduction of Joe Tynan	Angela
1981	The Fan	Douglas' Sister
1982	The World According to Garp	Chief Ellen Jamesian
1983	Cujo	Charity Camber
1985	Compromising Positions	Scotty Hughes
1987	Stacking	Connie Van Buskirk
1987	Hello Again	Miss Lee
1988	Zelly and Me	Nora
1992	Mac	Mrs. Stunder
1996	Before and After	Marian Raynor
1998	Hush	Sister O'Shaughnessy
1998	A Civil Action	Mrs. Granger
2006	Stephanie Daley	Pastor
2008	A Sense of Wonder	Rachel Carson
2011	A Bird of the Air	Mrs. Blair

=== Television ===
Kaiulani Lee television credits
Year	Title	Role	Notes
1976	The Waltons	Nurse Nora Taylor	2 episodes
1979	ABC Afterschool Special	Ms. Lanie	Episode: "The Late Great Me! Story of a Teenage Alcoholic"
1980	Paul's Case	Third Actress	TV movie
1981	American Playhouse	Alex	Episode: "Until She Talks"
1982	CBS Library	Mrs. Stolz	Episode: "Robbers, Rooftops and Witches"
1983	Jacobo Timerman: Prisoner Without a Name, Cell Without a Number		TV movie
1983	Chiefs	Mrs. Butts	2 episodes
1986	Tales from the Darkside	Mrs. Valeria Cantrell	Episode: "Deliver Us from Goodness"
1987	The Equalizer	Lorraine Watson	Episode: "First Light"
1988	American Playhouse	Dorothy Day	Episode: "Journey Into Genius"
1989	The Equalizer	Ms. Watson	Episode: "Trial by Ordeal"
1990	As the World Turns	Dr. Michaels	Episode #1.8958
1990	Vestige of Honor	Bonnie Boyle	TV movie
1991	Golden Years	Sybil	Episode: "The Final Blow"
1991	Law & Order	Mrs. Goddard / Nancy Driscoll	Episode: "God Bless the Child"
1998	American Experience	Martha Ballard	Episode: "A Midwife's Tale"
2001	Law & Order	Mrs. Goddard / Nancy Driscoll	Episode: "Phobia"
2007–2008	Bill Moyers Journal	Rachel Carson	2 episodes
