= Mary Hobart =

American physician

Mary Forrester Hobart
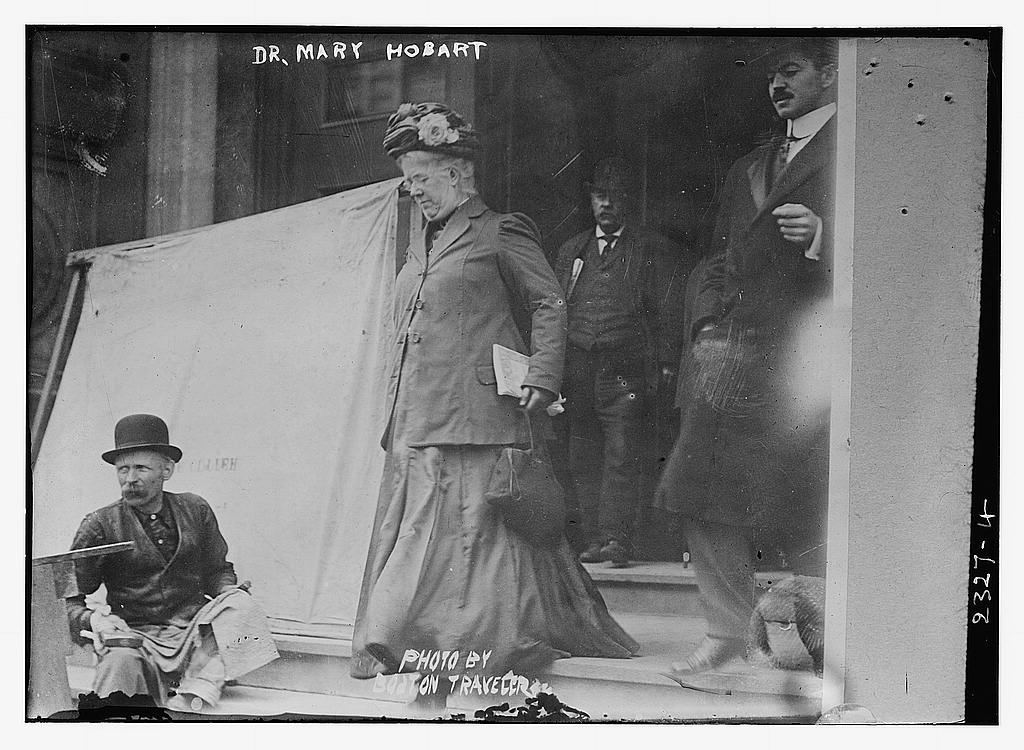
- Mary Hobart, sometime between 1910 and 1915, from the Library of Congress archives.
- Born: 1851; Boston, Massachusetts, US
- Died: March 21, 1940 (Age 89); Needham, Massachusetts, US
- Education: Women's Medical College of the New York Infirmary, 1884

Mary Forrester Hobart (1851 – March 21, 1940) was an American physician who practiced in Boston, Massachusetts from 1884 until her retirement in 1915. She specialized in obstetrics and was known for her independence and resourcefulness. Her career had parallels with that of her great-great-grandmother, Martha Ballard; but Mary Hobart sought out the medical profession by her own ambition as an early entrant. Her service was due in part to caring for the poor in hospitals.

Hobart chose to remain single for her entire life, since she could independently support herself. She practiced for 31 years in Boston before retiring in Needham Heights, Massachusetts, where she lived until her death.

== Early life and education ==
Hobart was born in Boston in 1851. She trained at the Women's Medical College, of the New York Infirmary for Women and Children until 1884.

== Martha Ballard's diary ==
By the time Hobart graduated from the Women's Medical College, her cousin Lucy Lambard Fessenden gathered her great-great-grandmother, Martha Ballard's, historical diary for her great aunts to give to Mary. Though Mary is known to be a pioneer in medicine, her great-great-grandmother, Martha Ballard, is a late 18th-century housewife whose diary is the main source for the book, A Midwife’s Tale. Since Hobart was one of few to graduate from medical school in her family, it was only fitting to have a diary of medical importance passed down to her. Hobart was 33 when she received "a hopeless pile of loose unconsecutive pages". Her great aunts, Sarah Lambard and Hannah Lambard Walcott, decided it was best for Hobart to take care of the diary. She decided to donate the diary to the Maine State Library in 1930. In exchange of the donation, Hobart expected a transcript copy of the diary. She never received a full translation of the work, but Hobart was grateful for the parts she was given.

== Adulthood ==
Following the Women's Medical College, she was practicing medicine at the New England Hospital for Women and Children from 1886 until 1913.^{[1]} The hospital was founded in 1862 by Marie Zakrzewska. Here, Hobart specialized in obstetrics^{[2]} concentrating on pregnancies, childbirth, and postpartum period.

Hobart retired in Needham Heights, Massachusetts. There, she became a member of the Massachusetts Medical Society. Women were allowed to enter the Massachusetts Medical Society on June 10, 1884, the same year Hobart received Martha Ballard's historical diary.

Mary Forrester Hobart died at her home in Needham Heights on March 21, 1940, at the age of 89.
