= A House Full of Females =

2017 book by Laurel Thatcher Ulrich

A House Full of Females: Plural Marriage and Women's Rights in Early Mormonism, 1835–1870
- Author: Laurel Thatcher Ulrich
- Subject: Women and polygamy in the early Latter Day Saint movement
- Genre: Non-fiction
- Publisher: Alfred A. Knopf
- Publication date: January 10, 2017

A House Full of Females: Plural Marriage and Women's Rights in Early Mormonism, 1835–1870 is a non-fiction book written by American historian Laurel Thatcher Ulrich. The book was published on January 10, 2017, by Knopf.

A House Full of Females analyzes the lives of women of the early Latter Day Saint movement who lived in polygamous relationships during the 19th century. In her book, Ulrich presents the concept of "sex radicalism" which she defines as "the idea that a woman should choose when and with whom to have children." Ulrich argues that analyzing polygamous Mormon women through the lens of sex radicalism presents a new understanding of gender relations in early Mormonism. Ulrich uses diaries and letters from polygamous Mormon men and women to describe their lifestyle.

== Synopsis ==
A House Full of Females draws on information from diaries, letters, photo albums, quilts, and minute books from Mormons in the nineteenth century who experienced polygamy. While telling the history of the church in the 1800s, Ulrich focuses on how Mormon women responded to polygamy. She also highlights suffrage in Utah during polygamy and women's place in the Church of Jesus Christ of Latter-day Saints (LDS Church). Ulrich shows that there was a great variety of opinions and feelings about the practice among its participants. She examines how polygamy allowed some women to have successful careers, escape previous marriages, have a place in society, and have a family. Ulrich also shows the confusion, religious sin, and social controversy as a result of instituting the practice. In framing polygamy as both a society structure and a religious practice, Ulrich shows how Mormon women, many of whom were involved in polygamous relationships, became actively involved in political and social causes. (Note: Utah became the second state to give women the right to vote, fifty years prior to the passage of the 19th Amendment.) Ulrich argues that polygamy empowered women to become political actors, particularly in the suffrage movement. Ulrich also analyzes women's place in the church and gender relations in Mormon society and hypothesizes that gender relations in the LDS Church today are partially a result of polygamy. Ulrich argues that polygamy was both complicated and empowering for the women involved.

== Development ==
=== Influences ===
When asked why she decided to write A House Full of Females, Ulrich said that after spending forty years in academia teaching and publishing about women's history and early American history, she wanted to write something about Mormon history. She also cites hearing stories about the Mormon pioneers as a child as inspiration for the book.

=== Research style ===
As Ulrich began research for the book, she became "totally entranced" by Wilford Woodruff's extensive diary. In an interview, Ulrich says that reading Woodruff's diary gave her the idea to use diaries as her main sources. In the book, Ulrich compares the book to a quilt because she considers it to be an "attempt to find an underlying unity in a collection of fragments."

Ulrich also comments on her research process in the introduction:

Because I want to understand early Mormonism from the perspective of those who embraced it, I have chosen to focus on diaries and other day-by-day records, such as letters, occasional poetry, and minutes of meetings. Some historians silently merge documents like these with autobiographies and memoirs written decades later. I have not done that. Retrospective accounts are valuable, but they have to be understood in relation to the conflicts and commemorations that produced them....This is not to say that diaries are more truthful than memoirs, just better at conveying the instability of events as they unfolded. Diarists did not know how things would turn out.

When asked how she interpreted the sources used in the book, Ulrich said that she does not see the diaries as a "set of facts," but rather focuses on what is important to the writer. Ulrich also noted that she studied the diaries by comparing them against each other.

=== Publication ===
A House Full of Females was published on January 10, 2017, by Knopf.

== Critical reception ==
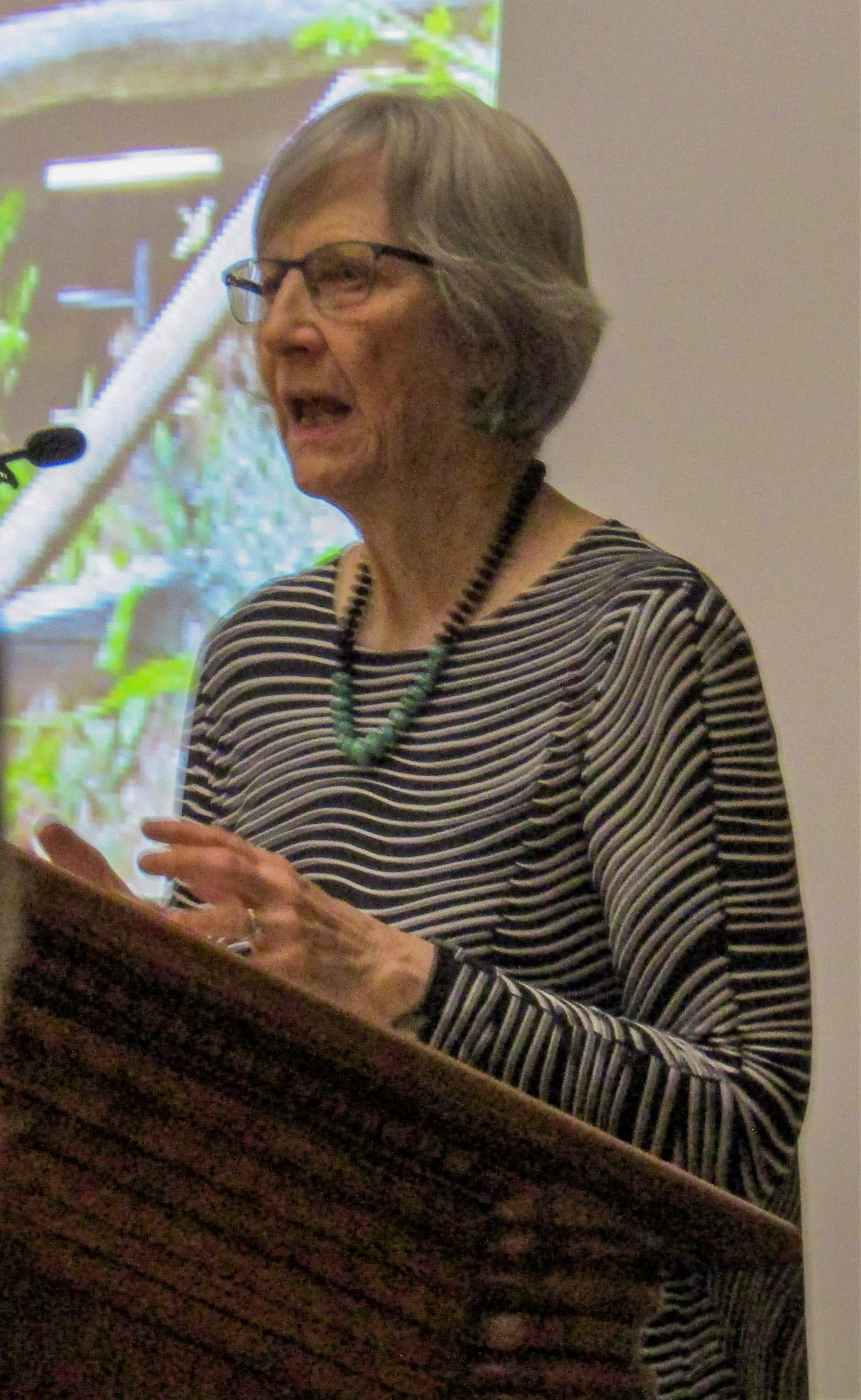
Ulrich speaking in 2017

=== Reviews ===
A number of women and early American historians praise Ulrich for her extensive research by reading journals and letters of Mormons who lived while polygamy was practiced rather than using memoirs published later. Reviewers also write that Ulrich's book is written in a way that is unbiased and factually accurate. Reviewer Lowell Bennion considered the book a "masterful work" though argued that it gives the impression that polygamy was more common in Utah than it actually was. Reviewers also praise Ulrich for writing about a complex topic in a way that shows the religious and social aspects of polygamy and highlights why Mormon women choose to defend polygamy. Many also describe the book as being enjoyable as well as educational. Historian and author Kate Holbrook writes in Nova Religio that the book is "required reading for scholars of American religious history" and refers Ulrich's use of sources as the book's "most significant" contribution. Beverly Gage writes that "[Ulrich] even makes a case for plural marriage as a vehicle for a form of feminist consciousness-raising."

=== Awards ===
A House Full of Females received the 2017 Evan Biography Award from the Mountain West Center at Utah State University.
