= American Experience season 14 =

American Experience
- Season 14
- No. of episodes: 14

Release
- Original network: PBS
- Original release: September 30, 2001 – May 12, 2002

Season chronology
- ← Previous; Season 13 Next → Season 15

Season fourteen of the television program American Experience originally aired on the PBS network in the United States on September 30, 2001 and concluded on May 12, 2002. The season contained 14 new episodes and began with the sixth part of the miniseries New York: A Documentary Film, "City of Tomorrow".

== Episodes ==
No. overall	No. in season	Title	Directed by	Categories	Original release date
159	1	"New York: A Documentary Film (Part 6)"	Ric Burns	Popular Culture	September 30, 2001
Part 6: "City of Tomorrow"
160	2	"New York: A Documentary Film (Part 7)"	Ric Burns	Popular Culture	October 1, 2001
Part 7: "The City and the World"
161	3	"War Letters"	Robert Kenner	War	November 11, 2001
162	4	"Woodrow Wilson (Part 1)"	Carl Byker & Mitch Wilson	Biographies, Presidents, War	January 6, 2002
Part 1: "A Passionate Man"
163	5	"Woodrow Wilson (Part 2)"	Carl Byker & Mitch Wilson	Biographies, Presidents, War	January 13, 2002
Part 2: "The Redemption of the World"
164	6	"Mount Rushmore"	Mark Zwonitzer	The Natural Environment	January 20, 2002
165	7	"Miss America"	Lisa Ades	Popular Culture	January 27, 2002
166	8	"Zoot Suit Riots"	Joseph Tovares	Civil Rights, Politics	February 10, 2002
167	9	"Monkey Trial"	Christine Lesiak	Politics, Popular Culture	February 17, 2002
168	10	"Public Enemy #1"	Ben Loeterman	Biographies, Politics, Popular Culture	February 24, 2002
169	11	"Ansel Adams: A Documentary Film"	Ric Burns	Biographies, Popular Culture, The Natural Environment	April 21, 2002
170	12	"A Brilliant Madness"	Mark Samels	Biographies	April 28, 2002
171	13	"Ulysses S. Grant (Part 1)"	Adriana Bosch	Biographies, Politics, Popular Culture, Presidents, War	May 5, 2002
Part 1: "Warrior"
172	14	"Ulysses S. Grant (Part 2)"	Elizabeth Deane	Biographies, Politics, Popular Culture, Presidents, War	May 12, 2002
Part 2: "President"
