= American Experience season 13 =

American Experience
- Season 13
- No. of episodes: 12

Release
- Original network: PBS
- Original release: October 16, 2000 – April 23, 2001

Season chronology
- ← Previous; Season 12 Next → Season 14

Season thirteen of the television program American Experience originally aired on the PBS network in the United States on October 16, 2000 and concluded on April 23, 2001. Beginning with this season, American Experience began broadcasting without a host, and the word "The" was dropped. The season contained 12 new episodes and began with the first part of the film The Rockefellers.

== Episodes ==
* Denotes multiple chapters that aired on the same date and share the same episode number

No. overall	No. in season	Title	Directed by	Categories	Original release date
147	1	"The Rockefellers (Part 1)"	Elizabeth Deane	Biographies, Popular Culture	October 16, 2000
148	2	"The Rockefellers (Part 2)"	Adriana Bosch	Biographies, Popular Culture	October 23, 2000
149	3	"Secrets of a Master Builder"	Carl Charlson	Biographies, Technology	October 30, 2000
150	4	"Return with Honor"	Freida Lee Mock & Terry Sanders	Politics, War	November 13, 2000
151	5	"Streamliners: America's Lost Trains"	Thomas Ott	Technology	February 5, 2001
152	6	"Marcus Garvey: Look For Me in the Whirlwind"	Stanley Nelson	Biographies, Civil Rights, Politics	February 12, 2001
153	7*	"Abraham and Mary Lincoln: A House Divided (Parts 1–2)"	David Grubin	Biographies, Presidents	February 19, 2001
Part 1: "Ambition"; Part 2: "We Are Elected"
154	8*	"Abraham and Mary Lincoln: A House Divided (Parts 3–4)"	David Grubin	Biographies, Presidents	February 20, 2001
Part 3: "Shattered"; Part 4: "The Dearest of All Things"
155	9*	"Abraham and Mary Lincoln: A House Divided (Parts 5–6)"	David Grubin	Biographies, Presidents	February 21, 2001
Part 5: "This Frightful War"; Part 6: "Blind with Weeping"
156	10	"Scottsboro: An American Tragedy"	Barak Goodman	Civil Rights	April 2, 2001
157	11	"Fatal Flood"	Chana Gazit	The Natural Environment	April 16, 2001
158	12	"Stephen Foster"	Randall MacLowry	Biographies, Popular Culture	April 23, 2001
