= American Experience season 10 =

American Experience
- Season 10
- No. of episodes: 9

Release
- Original network: PBS
- Original release: October 5, 1997 – April 13, 1998

Season chronology
- ← Previous; Season 9 Next → Season 11

Season ten of the television program American Experience originally aired on the PBS network in the United States on October 5, 1997 and concluded on April 13, 1998. This is the tenth season to feature David McCullough as the host, and the show celebrated its 10th anniversary. The season contained nine new episodes and began with the first part of the film Truman.

== Episodes ==
No. overall	No. in season	Title	Directed by	Categories	Original release date
113	1	"Truman (Part 1)"	David Grubin	Biographies, Politics, Presidents, War	October 5, 1997
114	2	"Truman (Part 2)"	David Grubin	Biographies, Politics, Presidents, War	October 6, 1997
115	3	"A Midwife's Tale"	Richard P. Rogers	Biographies	January 19, 1998
116	4	"Mr. Miami Beach"	Mark Davis	Biographies	February 2, 1998
117	5	"Influenza 1918"	Robert Kenner	Technology	February 9, 1998
The film examines the outbreak of the 1918 flu pandemic within the United States, one of the worst epidemics in the nations history.
118	6	"Reagan (Part 1)"	Adriana Bosch	Biographies, Politics, Presidents	February 23, 1998
Part 1: "Lifeguard"
119	7	"Reagan (Part 2)"	Austin Hoyt	Biographies, Politics, Presidents	February 24, 1998
Part 2: "An American Crusade"
120	8	"Surviving the Dust Bowl"	Chana Gazit	The Natural Environment	March 2, 1998
121	9	"Riding the Rails"	Lexy Lovell & Michael Uys	Popular Culture	April 13, 1998
