= American Experience season 16 =

American Experience
- Season 16
- No. of episodes: 9

Release
- Original network: PBS
- Original release: September 8, 2003 – May 3, 2004

Season chronology
- ← Previous; Season 15 Next → Season 17

Season sixteen of the television program American Experience originally aired on the PBS network in the United States on September 8, 2003 and concluded on May 3, 2004. The season contained nine new episodes and began with the eighth and final part of the miniseries New York: A Documentary Film, "The Center of the World".

== Episodes ==
No. overall	No. in season	Title	Directed by	Categories	Original release date
186	1	"New York: A Documentary Film (Part 8)"	Ric Burns	Popular Culture, Technology	September 8, 2003
Part 8: "The Center of the World" - Recounts the history of the World Trade Center. The film was produced following the September 11, 2001 terrorist attacks.
187	2	"Reconstruction: The Second Civil War (Part 1)"	Llewellyn M. Smith	Civil Rights, War	January 12, 2004
188	3	"Reconstruction: The Second Civil War (Part 2)"	Elizabeth Deane	Civil Rights, War	January 13, 2004
189	4	"Citizen King"	Orlando Bagwell & W. Noland Walker	Biographies, Civil Rights	January 19, 2004
The film chronicles the last five years of Martin Luther King Jr.'s life before his assassination in 1968. The film aired to coincide with the 75th anniversary of King's birthday.
190	5	"Remember the Alamo"	Joseph Tovares	The American West, War	February 2, 2004
191	6	"Tupperware!"	Laurie Kahn-Leavitt	Popular Culture	February 9, 2004
192	7	"Emma Goldman"	Mel Bucklin	Biographies, Politics	April 12, 2004
193	8	"Patriots Day"	Marian Marzynski	Popular Culture	April 19, 2004
The film examines the reenactment of the Battles of Lexington and Concord and the personal lives of the reenactors.
194	9	"Golden Gate Bridge"	Ben Loeterman	Technology	May 3, 2004
