= American Experience season 17 =

American Experience
- Season 17
- No. of episodes: 11

Release
- Original network: PBS
- Original release: October 4, 2004 – May 23, 2005

Season chronology
- ← Previous; Season 16 Next → Season 18

Season seventeen of the television program American Experience originally aired on the PBS network in the United States on October 4, 2004 and concluded on May 23, 2005. The season contained 11 new episodes and began with the film RFK.

== Episodes ==
No. overall	No. in season	Title	Directed by	Categories	Original release date
195	1	"RFK"	David Grubin	Biographies, Politics	October 4, 2004
196	2	"The Fight"	Barak Goodman	Biographies, Civil Rights, Popular Culture	October 18, 2004
The film chronicles the boxing matches between Joe Louis and Max Schmeling.
197	3	"Fidel Castro"	Adriana Bosch	Biographies	January 31, 2005
198	4	"Building the Alaska Highway"	Tracy Heather Strain	Technology, War	February 7, 2005
199	5	"Kinsey"	Barak Goodman & John Maggio	Biographies, Popular Culture	February 14, 2005
200	6	"Mary Pickford"	Sue Williams	Biographies, Popular Culture	April 4, 2005
201	7	"The Great Transatlantic Cable"	Peter Jones	Technology	April 11, 2005
202	8	"The Massie Affair"	Mark Zwonitzer	Popular Culture	April 18, 2005
Note: The episode reaired on April 17, 2018 as "The Island Murder".
203	9	"Victory in the Pacific"	Austin Hoyt	War	May 2, 2005
204	10	"The Carter Family: Will the Circle Be Unbroken"	Kathy Conkwright	Biographies, Popular Culture	May 9, 2005
Recounts the successes and failures of A. P. Carter and his singing partners known as the Carter Family. During the Great Depression, they became the first vocal group to become country music stars.
205	11	"Guerrilla: The Taking of Patty Hearst"	Robert Stone	Politics, Popular Culture	May 23, 2005
