= Believability: Sexual Violence, Media, and the Politics of Doubt =

2023 non-fiction book by Sarah Banet-Weiser and Kathryn Claire Higgins

- Author: Sarah Banet-Weiser and Kathryn Claire Higgins
- Language: English
- Subject: Sexual violence, mass media, credibility
- Publisher: Polity Press
- Publication date: June 2023
- ISBN: 978-1-5095-5381-5
- OCLC: 1353294092

Believability: Sexual Violence, Media, and the Politics of Doubt is a 2023 non-fiction book by Sarah Banet-Weiser and Kathryn Claire Higgins, published by Polity Press. It looks at how media culture decides which accounts of sexual violence get believed, and how that varies by gender and race.

== Publication ==
Banet-Weiser is a professor of communication at the Annenberg School for Communication at the University of Pennsylvania and the University of Southern California. Higgins was a postdoctoral fellow at the Annenberg School at the time of publication, and later became a lecturer in global digital politics at Goldsmiths, University of London. The book was published by Polity Press in June 2023.

== Synopsis ==
The book discusses the MeToo movement and the rise of post-truth and fake news discourse. Banet-Weiser and Higgins use these developments to examine how claims of sexual violence are believed or doubted. They describe this process as an "economy of believability", in which social and cultural factors influence whose accounts are treated as credible. The authors argue that marginalised people often face a greater burden in having their claims believed.

== Reception ==
Olumide Adisa, writing for the LSE Review of Books, described the book as a "transdisciplinary masterpiece" and argued that it contributed to understanding the role of media in framing women's accounts of violence. Adisa also questioned whether the book sufficiently distinguishes between credibility and believability and suggested that the intersections of class, gender, and race could have received greater attention.

In The Sociological Review, Catherine Rottenberg described the book as innovative in its approach to the authentication of sexual-violence claims beyond questions of evidence and testimony. She particularly discussed the book's treatment of believability as unequally distributed, while arguing that social media may reproduce dominant structures of credibility rather than redistribute them.

The book was also reviewed by Meenakshi Gigi Durham and Máiréad Casey in Feminist Media Studies, Jilly Boyce Kay in the International Journal of Communication, Melody House in Gender, Work & Organization and Andrea Jean Baker in the Australian Journalism Review.
