= Southampton Cemetery =

Cemetery in New York state, US

Coordinates: 40°54′02″N 72°24′16″W

The Southampton Cemetery is located in Southampton, New York, United States. Southampton has 47 public and private cemeteries.

== Notable burials ==
- Roone Pinckney Arledge (1931–2002) – sports and news broadcasting executive
- Carl Andrew Capasso (1945–2001) – sewer contractor convicted of tax fraud
- Jack Dempsey (1895–1983) – heavyweight boxing champion
- Catherine Murray di Montezemolo (1925–2009) – fashion editor for Vogue
- Tom Ewell (1909–1994) – actor
- Patricia Kennedy Lawford (1924–2006) – socialite and sister of U.S. President John F. Kennedy
- George Washington Martin II (1876–1948) – lawyer, jurist, and member of the Democratic Party
- Henry Augustus Reeves (1832–1916) – U.S. Representative
- James Alfred Van Allen (1914–2006) – astrophysicist who discovered the Van Allen Belts
