= Hortense Gabel =

American judge (1912-1990)

Hortense Wittstein Gabel (December 16, 1912 – December 6, 1990) was an American lawyer who served on the New York Supreme Court. Her judicial career came to an end after she was charged with lowering alimony payments for Carl Andrew Capasso in exchange for a position for her daughter at the New York City Department of Consumer Affairs, which was then headed by Capasso's lover Bess Myerson. In the ensuing trial, she was acquitted of all charges.

== Biography ==
She was born as Hortense Wittstein in the Bronx on December 16, 1912, to Bessie and Rubin J. Wittstein. She attended Hunter College High School. She graduated from Hunter College in 1934 and earned her law degree from Columbia Law School in 1937 and went to work at her father's law firm. She left her father's law firm in 1944 to marry Dr. Milton Gabel, a United States Army dentist stationed at Fort Hood, Texas.

Gabel had her first association with housing in 1955, when she was appointed as general counsel to the Temporary State Rent Commission. In May 1959 she was hired by the city to create a neighborhood conservation program and was given a second position in 1960 as an assistant to the mayor on slum clearance issues. On April 12, 1962, Mayor of New York City Robert F. Wagner, Jr. appointed her to head the city's Rent and Rehabilitation Agency, in which she oversaw the nearly 5,000,000 residents living in rent controlled apartments.

Gabel was appointed to the New York State Supreme Court in 1975. She was known as a compassionate judge who supported civil rights and women's causes. In 1986, she was named judge of the year by the National Association of Women Judges, an organization she helped found in 1979.

While under investigation in the Myerson case, Gabel was removed from her position as a trial judge in June 1987 by Milton Williams, the deputy chief administrative judge for the city's courts. After a two-month-long trial, Gabel was acquitted in December 1988 of charges that she had reduced Andy Capasso's alimony payments in exchange for Bess Myerson hiring Gabel's daughter Sukhreet to a $19,000 position as a special assistant.

Gabel died of heart failure at age 77 on December 6, 1990.

In the 2019 film Motherless Brooklyn, a community activist played by Cherry Jones was primarily based on Gabel.
