= Atlantic City Historical Museum =

Museum in Atlantic City, New Jersey

Coordinates: 39.355137°N 74.438450°W

The Atlantic City Historical Museum is a museum located in the Atlantic City Experience on Boardwalk Hall, in Atlantic City, New Jersey. The museum was opened in 1985 which was co-founded by Florence Miller, Vicki Gold Levi and Anthony Kutschera, and contains over a 150 years of the city's history.

== History ==
The Atlantic City Historical Museum opened in 1985 in the now defunct Garden Pier. The museum was opened near the Atlantic City Art Center and displays 150 years of the city's history including many photos from Al Gold, Atlantic City's official photographer from 1939 to 1964. The museum also contains a life-sized Mr. Peanut, posters displaying the city's golden era, relics from old eras and a documentary showcasing the most unique seaside resorts. Since, Miss America was first hosted at the Garden Pier, the museum also contains numerous old Miss America dresses.

In March 2016, the original location closed after the Garden Pier was sold to Philadelphia-based developer Bart Blatstein. As of 2019, both the Atlantic City Historical Museum and the Atlantic City Art Center moved to the Jim Whelan Boardwalk Hall and is now a part of the Atlantic City Experience.
