= American Experience season 12 =

American Experience
- Season 12
- No. of episodes: 15

Release
- Original network: PBS
- Original release: November 14, 1999 – May 22, 2000

Season chronology
- ← Previous; Season 11 Next → Season 13

Season twelve of the television program American Experience originally aired on the PBS network in the United States on November 14, 1999, and concluded on May 22, 2000. This is the last season to feature David McCullough as the host, he had been with them since the show's debut in 1988. The season contained 15 new episodes and began with the first part of the miniseries New York: A Documentary Film, "The Country and the City".

== Episodes ==
No. overall	No. in season	Title	Directed by	Categories	Original release date
132	1	"New York: A Documentary Film (Part 1)"	Ric Burns	Popular Culture	November 14, 1999
Part 1: "The Country and the City" - The series begins with the founding of New Amsterdam, a Dutch trading post. The city starts to take shape as New Amsterdam becomes British New York. By the time of the Revolutionary War, the city becomes the site for several key battles. This episode also covers the building of the Erie Canal.
133	2	"New York: A Documentary Film (Part 2)"	Ric Burns	Popular Culture	November 15, 1999
Part 2: "Order and Disorder" - New York City has the largest port in the country. Waves of Irish and German immigrants flood into the city between 1825 and 1865 only to find that New York is not so welcoming to immigrants. Frederick Law Olmsted and Calvert Vaux shape the city with their design for Central Park but social unrest still ran high for the working classes, coming to a climax with the draft riots of 1863.
134	3	"New York: A Documentary Film (Part 3)"	Ric Burns	Popular Culture	November 16, 1999
Part 3: "Sunshine and Shadow" - The Gilded Age following the Civil War saw the rise of the robber barons and the schism between wealth and poverty widen dramatically. The political life of the city, exemplified by William M. Tweed and Tammany Hall descended into total corruption. As the turn of the century dawned, New York City annexes Brooklyn, Queens, the Bronx, and Staten Island.
135	4	"New York: A Documentary Film (Part 4)"	Ric Burns	Popular Culture	November 17, 1999
Part 4: "The Power and the People" - As the city starts building the skyscrapers that would make its skyline iconic, 10 million immigrants arrive in New York. The immigrants lived in frequently squalid conditions and worked in the city's most undesirable jobs. In 1911, when 146 female Jewish and Italian immigrants died in the Triangle Shirtwaist Factory fire, the city was largely unified in the successful demand for legislation on new factory safety reforms and labor laws.
136	5	"New York: A Documentary Film (Part 5)"	Ric Burns	Popular Culture	November 18, 1999
Part 5: "Cosmopolis" - Following World War I, Manhattan becomes the cultural capital of the world, serving as the home to the brand new industries of radio broadcasting, magazines, advertising and public relations. Major cultural contributions were made by F. Scott Fitzgerald, George Gershwin, Duke Ellington and Louis Armstrong, and the Harlem Renaissance was the banner under which an explosion of African American culture and creativity lived. As the Great Depression dawned, the Chrysler Building and Empire State Building were completed.
137	6	"Eleanor Roosevelt"	Sue Williams	Biographies, Politics, Presidents	January 10, 2000
138	7	"Houdini"	Nancy Porter	Biographies, Popular Culture	January 24, 2000
139	8	"Nixon's China Game"	Mark Anderson & Michael Simkin	Biographies, Politics	January 31, 2000
140	9	"The Duel"	Carl Byker & Mitch Wilson	Politics	February 14, 2000
141	10	"John Brown's Holy War"	Robert Kenner	Biographies, Civil Rights	February 28, 2000
142	11	"George Wallace: Settin' the Woods on Fire (Part 1)"	Daniel McCabe & Paul Stekler	Biographies, Civil Rights, Politics	April 23, 2000
143	12	"George Wallace: Settin' the Woods on Fire (Part 2)"	Daniel McCabe & Paul Stekler	Biographies, Civil Rights, Politics	April 24, 2000
144	13	"Jubilee Singers: Sacrifice and Glory"	Llewellyn M. Smith	Civil Rights, Popular Culture	May 1, 2000
145	14	"Joe DiMaggio: The Hero's Life"	Mark Zwonitzer	Biographies, Popular Culture	May 8, 2000
146	15	"The Wizard of Photography"	James A. DeVinney	Biographies, Technology	May 22, 2000
