= A Brilliant Madness =

2002 TV documentary on mathematician John Nash

- American Experience episode
- Episode no.: Season 14; Episode 12
- Directed by: Mark Samels
- Original air date: April 28, 2002
- Running time: 55 minutes

Episode chronology
- American Experience season 14

A Brilliant Madness is a PBS American Experience documentary on the life of mathematician John Nash. It first aired April 28, 2002, and was produced by Randall MacLowry and directed by Mark Samels.
