= Carl Andrew Capasso =

Sewer contractor (1945–2001)

Carl Andrew "Andy" Capasso (September 10, 1945 – March 14, 2001) was a sewer contractor, who was convicted of tax fraud. He was later accused of bribing judge Hortense Gabel by arranging a job for the judge's daughter, Sukhreet Gabel, with Bess Myerson. Myerson was indicted and resigned her positions with the City of New York, but was ultimately acquitted. The scandal was the subject of When She Was Bad, a book by Shana Alexander published in 1991.

== Biography ==
Capasso was born in Brooklyn on September 10, 1945 to Josephine and Michael E. Capasso. He married Nancy Herbert in 1966.

Capasso started a construction company, Nanco Contracting Corporation, and won several contracts in New York City for sewer repair. In 1987, he was charged with writing off $1.2 million in renovations on his two Manhattan apartments as business expenses; and for receiving $300,000 in fraudulent damage claims against his own company without paying taxes on the income.

Capasso was convicted of tax evasion and his company was barred from working for New York City.

Capasso then served a four-year federal prison sentence at Federal Correctional Complex, Allenwood. In 1989 he used a front company to win a new contract.

Capasso started dating Bess Myerson, and when his wife learned of the affair, they divorced. He was ordered to pay $1,500 a week in support by Judge Hortense Gabel. Capasso had Bess Myerson hire the daughter of Judge Gabel at the New York City Department of Consumer Affairs. Gabel then lowered his support payments to $500 a week. He died of pancreatic cancer on March 14, 2001 at age 55. He is buried in Southampton Cemetery.
