= Bess Myerson =

American actress and politician (1924–2014)

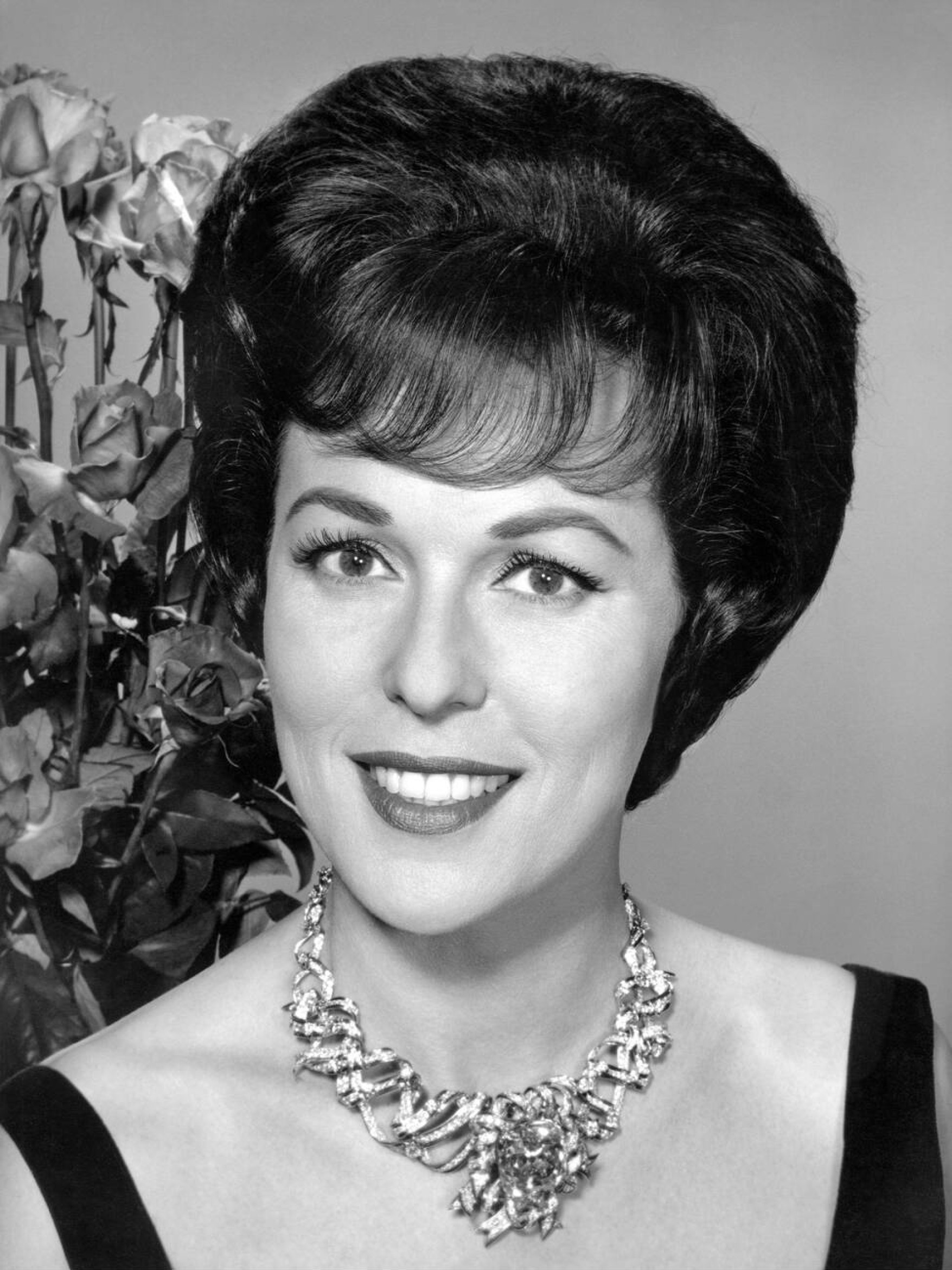
- Myerson in 1963

Commissioner of New York City Department of Consumer Affairs
- In office 1969–1973
- Appointed by: John V. Lindsay
- Preceded by: Gerard Maxwell Weisberg; as Commissioner of Public Markets
- Succeeded by: Betty Furness

Commissioner of New York City Department of Cultural Affairs
- In office 1983–1987
- Appointed by: Ed Koch

Personal details
- Born: July 16, 1924 New York City, U.S.
- Died: December 14, 2014 (aged 90) Santa Monica, California, U.S.
- Party: Democratic
- Height: 5 ft 10 in (178 cm)
- Spouses: Allan Wayne; Arnold M. Grant
- Children: Barra Grant
- Education: Hunter College
- Occupation: Model, city commissioner, TV show celebrity
- Known for: Miss America 1945; Miss New York City 1945; Only Jewish American and first Miss New York selected as Miss America, and subsequent television, and New York City political career.
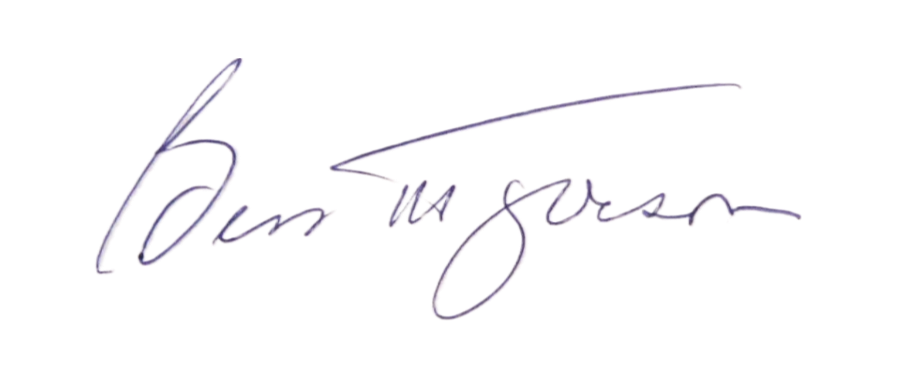
- Signature

Bess Myerson (July 16, 1924 – December 14, 2014) was an American politician, model, and television actress who in 1945 became the first Miss America who was Jewish. Her achievement, in the aftermath of the Holocaust, was seen as an affirmation of the Jewish place in American life. She was a heroine to parts of the Jewish community, where "she was the most famous pretty girl since Queen Esther".

Myerson made frequent television appearances during the 1950s and 1960s. She was a commissioner in the New York City government, served on presidential commissions from the 1960s through the 1980s, and ran unsuccessfully for the U.S. Senate. Her career in public service ended in the late 1980s when she was indicted on bribery and conspiracy charges. She was acquitted after a highly publicized trial.

== Biography ==
Myerson was born in the Bronx, New York, to Louis Myerson and Bella (née Podell), who were Jewish immigrants from Russia. Myerson's father worked as a housepainter, handyman and carpenter. After Myerson's birth, the family moved from the South Bronx to Shalom Aleichem Houses, a cooperative apartment complex in the northern Bronx. She had three siblings: a younger sister, Helen; an elder sister, Sylvia; and a brother, Joseph, who died at age 3, before Myerson was born.

Bess's upbringing emphasized the importance of scholarship over physical beauty. In addition to tradesmen, her neighbors included poets, writers and artists. Myerson reached her adult height when she was 12, and she towered over other children, something that she said made her feel "awkward and gawky" during her preadolescence. Myerson recalled one of her worst childhood memories was playing the tall and thin Popeye cartoon character Olive Oyl in an elementary school play.

Myerson began studying piano when she was 9 years old and was in the second class of New York's High School of Music and Art in 1937, graduating in 1941. She went to Hunter College, graduating with honors in 1945 with a Bachelor of Arts degree in music. To support herself and her family while in college, she gave piano lessons for fifty cents an hour, and worked as a music counselor at a girl's summer camp in Vermont.

=== Miss America ===
By the time she was 21, Myerson was 5 feet 10 inches (178 cm) tall with "luxuriant brown hair". Myerson was entered without her knowledge into the Miss New York City competition by John C. Pape, a retired steel magnate and amateur photographer who had employed her as a model while she was in college. When Myerson was told about the pageant by her sister Sylvia, who was acquainted with Pape, Myerson was angry because she felt that the beauty business was "embarrassing". However, she was persuaded to compete by Sylvia, and she competed in the swimsuit competition using a borrowed bathing suit.

Myerson enjoyed competing in the pageant, in which she stood out from the other contestants because of her height. On August 15, 1945, the day of Japan's surrender (VJ Day), she won the competition for the pageant and moved on to the Miss America competition, partly motivated by the $5,000 scholarship awarded to the winner. She told interviewers that she wanted to buy a black Steinway grand piano with the scholarship money.

Myerson was the Miss New York entry in the 1945 Miss America pageant, and she competed in the talent portion of the contest by performing the music of Edvard Grieg and George Gershwin. Prior to the competition, she was pressured to use a pseudonym that "sounded less Jewish". Despite revelations of the Holocaust in the previous months, America was still an Anglo-Saxon Protestant society that manifested hostility toward people of Jewish ancestry. Myerson refused and was subjected to substantial antisemitism. After she won the title on September 8, 1945, three of the pageant's five sponsors withdrew from having her represent their companies as Miss America.

She paid for graduate studies at Juilliard and Columbia University with the pageant scholarship money. An aspiring pianist, she briefly gave recitals on the vaudeville circuit before realizing that audiences were more interested in seeing her in a bathing suit. In 1946, she played in a Carnegie Hall popular music concert with members of the New York Philharmonic.

While Myerson was on her year-long tour as Miss America, she encountered "No Jews" signs posted in places such as hotels and country clubs. Such experiences led her to conduct lectures on behalf of the Anti-Defamation League titled "You Can't Be Beautiful and Hate". Myerson became a vocal opponent of antisemitism and racism, and her speaking tour became the highlight of her Miss America reign.

In 2015, Religion News Service observed that at the time when she won the pageant, emaciated concentration camp survivors had just shed their prison clothes. "Bess Myerson represented the resurrection of the Jewish body—the journey from degradation to beauty."

=== Television and politics ===
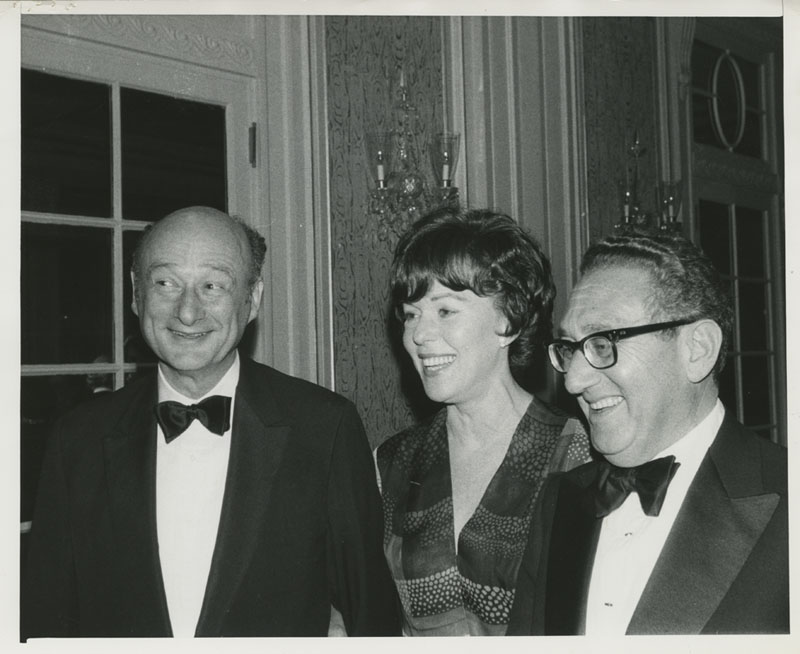
Ed Koch, Myerson, and Henry Kissinger, 1977

A few years after hearing her speak at an ADL function, television producer Walt Framer hired Myerson for the 1950s game show The Big Payoff. She was the "Lady in Mink" modeling the grand prize mink coat, and introducing guests and prizes, throughout the 1951 to 1959 network run of the program. Recognized for her wit and hard work, in 1954 Myerson was a panelist on the game show The Name's the Same and from 1958 through 1967 a panelist on I've Got a Secret. She regularly substituted for Dave Garroway on the Today Show. She was also a host of the television broadcast of the Miss America pageant from 1954 to 1968.

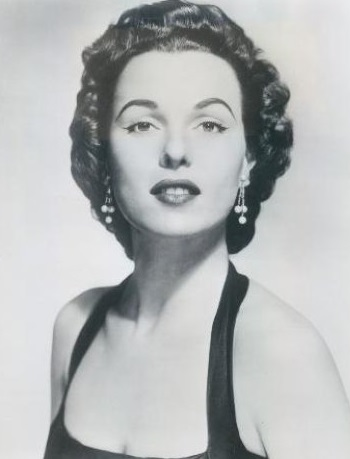
Myerson in 1957

Myerson stepped down from her other commitments in 1969 when appointed by Mayor John V. Lindsay to become the first Commissioner of the New York City Department of Consumer Affairs. Her career as a commercial pitchwoman for a number of products throughout the 1950s and 1960s had led to her becoming a consultant to several consumer products companies. In her consumer affairs position, which she held until 1973, she became a pioneer in consumer protection law.

She also served on several presidential commissions on violence, mental health, workplace issues and hunger in the 1960s and 1970s. Myerson was a frequent public companion of then-Congressman Ed Koch throughout the late 1970s and the beginning of his mayoral ambitions, and chaired his successful 1977 campaign for New York City mayor.

In the 1980 United States Senate election, Myerson vied for the Democratic nomination in New York against Congresswoman Elizabeth Holtzman, Queens District Attorney John J. Santucci, and Lindsay. Myerson lost to Holtzman by a wide margin. Holtzman was subsequently defeated by Al D'Amato.

In 2002, Myerson appeared in the documentary film Miss America as a former Miss America interviewee.

=== The "Bess Mess" ===
After serving in the Koch administration in 1983 as Commissioner of the Department of Cultural Affairs, Myerson's career became overshadowed by controversy. She became romantically involved with a married sewer contractor, Carl Andrew Capasso. It soon emerged that Hortense Gabel—the judge involved in Capasso's divorce case—had started socializing with Myerson. Judge Gabel's daughter (Sukhreet) was also hired by Myerson. After Gabel cut Capasso's child support payments, investigations began as to whether Gabel had been bribed. In April 1987, after Myerson invoked the Fifth Amendment, she was forced to resign her position in the Koch administration. The scandal became known as the "Bess Mess".

Myerson, Capasso and Gabel were indicted a year later and tried on federal charges of conspiracy, mail fraud, obstruction of justice, and using interstate facilities to violate state bribery laws, accused of conspiring to reduce Capasso's child support payments. With Sukhreet as the prosecution's chief witness, the main issue at the U.S. District Court trial was whether Myerson's decision to hire Sukhreet constituted bribery. After four months of trial proceedings, all three defendants were acquitted. Capasso remained in prison, having previously been convicted of unrelated tax charges.

=== Personal life ===
In October 1946, Myerson married Allan Wayne, a recently discharged U.S. Navy captain. They had one daughter, Barbara, born in 1947. The marriage was marred by domestic violence, and the couple divorced after eleven years. Myerson's second marriage was to attorney Arnold Grant, who legally adopted her daughter in 1962. The couple divorced in the early 1970s. Daughter Barbara became an actress, director and screenwriter who is better known as Barra Grant.

Before her federal trial began, Myerson was arrested in May 1988 for shoplifting at a department store in South Williamsport, Pennsylvania. She pleaded guilty to retail theft and was ordered to pay a fine.

Myerson was very connected to her Jewish roots, and was filmed in conversation with the Lubavitcher Rebbe. She donated funds to help build "Bessie's Bistro" at the Jewish Museum of Florida-FIU in memory of her parents, Bella and Louis Myerson, who lived in the neighborhood near the museum.

Myerson survived ovarian cancer in the 1970s and experienced a mild stroke in 1981, from which she made a full recovery. She moved to Florida in 2002 and later moved to California, where she remained until her death. In 2013, she was reported to be suffering from dementia.

=== Death ===
Myerson died on December 14, 2014, in Santa Monica, California, at age 90. Her death was not immediately announced publicly, but it was confirmed by the Los Angeles County Coroner's Office three weeks after she died. She was interred at Woodlawn Memorial Cemetery in Santa Monica.

== See also ==
Awards and achievements
Preceded by Venus Ramey	Miss America; 1945	Succeeded by Marilyn Buferd
Preceded by Bobby MacAdam	Miss New York; 1945	Succeeded by June Jenkins
