= Sarah Banet-Weiser =

American author (born 1966)

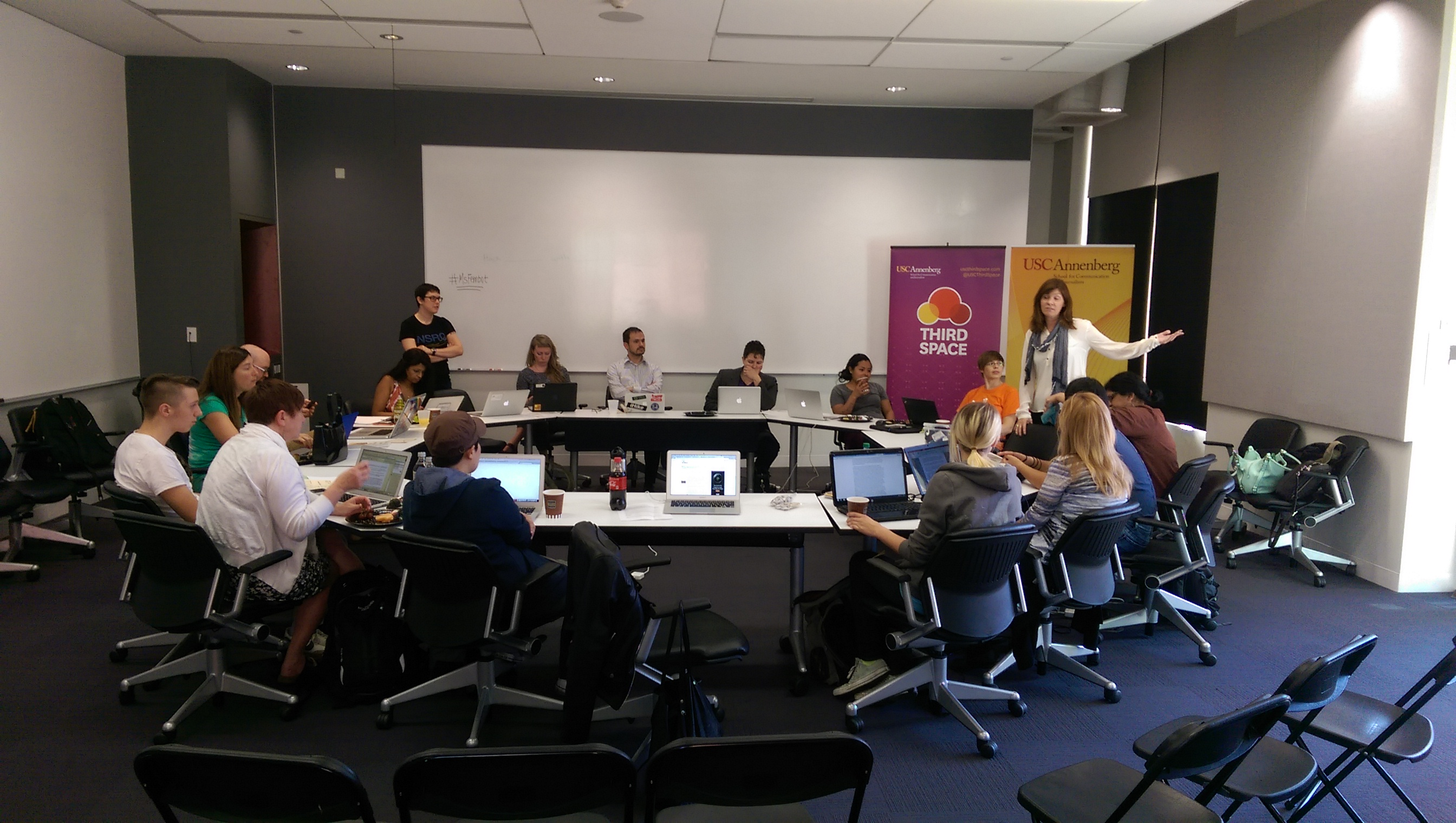
- Sarah Banet-Weiser at USC Annenberg, 2015
- Born: 1966 (age 59–60)

Sarah Banet-Weiser (born 1966) is an American distinguished professor of communication and author. She is currently the Walter H. Annenberg Dean of the Annenberg School for Communication at the University of Pennsylvania as well as a joint professor at the Annenberg School of Communication and Journalism at the University of Southern California and at the University of Pennsylvania. She previously was the head of the London School of Economics and Political Science's (LSE) Media and Communication Department between September 2018 and June 2021. In July 2014, Banet-Weiser became director of the USC Annenberg School for Communication.

== Professional work ==
In 2012, Banet-Weiser's book, Authentic™: The Politics of Ambivalence in a Brand Culture, was released. The book looks at consumerism and brands. The book was reviewed in Slate. Her work has been featured in The Wall Street Journal, Media, Culture & Society, Journal of Consumer Culture. In 2018, Banet-Weiser's book, Empowered: Popular Feminism and Popular Misogyny was released in the United Kingdom and the United States.

== Works ==
- Banet-Weiser, Sarah. Authentic™: The Politics of Ambivalence in a Brand Culture. New York: New York University Press (2012). ISBN 0814787142
- —, with Chris, Cynthia; Freitas, Anthony, eds. (September 2007). Cable Visions. New York, NY: New York University Press Academic. ISBN 9780814799499.
- —. Kids Rule!: Nickelodeon and Consumer Citizenship (Console-ing Passions). Durham: Duke University (2007).
- —.The Most Beautiful Girl in the World: Beauty Pageants and National Identity. Berkeley: University of California Press (1999).
- —. Empowered: Popular Feminism and Popular Misogyny. Duke University Press Books (2018). ISBN 9781478001683
- —, with Higgins, Kathryn Clare (2023). Believability: Sexual Violence, Media, and the Politics of Doubt. Cambridge, UK and Hoboken, New Jersey: Polity Press. ISBN 978-1-5095-5381-5.
