= George Washington Martin II =

American lawyer

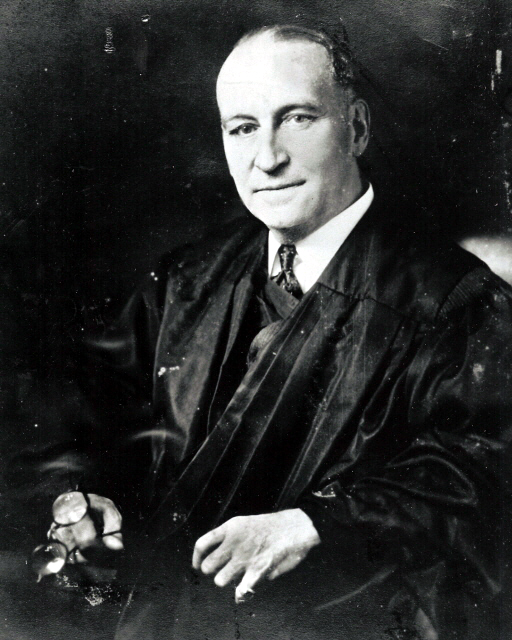
- Born: June 25, 1876; Brooklyn, New York
- Died: November 21, 1948 (aged 72)
- Spouse(s): Susie L. Phillips m. c. 1900; Maud Ainsworth (1892–1966) m. 1910
- Children: Audrey Martin (c1904), James McIntyre Martin (1912–2003), Peggy Martin (1915–1986), Jean Martin (c1916), Betsy Martin (1919–2001), George Washington Martin III (1921–1985), and Walter Ralston Martin (1928–1989)
- Parent(s): George Washington Martin I (1847–1910); Emma Frances de Revere (1853–1910)
- Relatives: Ephraim Story Martin, Sr. (1745–1833), great-grandfather

George Washington Martin, Jr. (June 25, 1876 – November 21, 1948) was a prominent lawyer, jurist, and member of the Democratic Party in Kings County, Brooklyn, New York. As a lawyer he defended many criminals at trial, and then later as a judge presided over a number of trials involving underworld figures associated with Murder, Inc. He was a controversial figure in the history of New York City law in the 1930s when the judiciary and police force of Brooklyn were investigated for corrupt activities. In 1939 he was the subject of criminal charges of bribery and judicial corruption that he successfully defended at trial. In late 1939 impeachment proceedings were taken against him through the New York state senate, but the charges were dismissed.

== Ancestry ==
Martin's great-great-grandfather, Ephraim Story Martin, Sr. (1745–1833) was born in Lunenburg, Massachusetts, on February 2, 1745. Ephraim served as a sergeant in the Revolutionary War, and married Mary Burnham. He died in Vermont on August 8, 1833. Martin's great-grandfather, Ephraim Story Martin, Jr. (1777–1842), was born on June 10, 1777, and grew up in Lunenburg, Massachusetts, where he married Nancy Haywood (1788–1862). She was born on February 25, 1788, and raised several children before she died in Springfield, Vermont. One of those children was Ephraim Dexter Martin (1809–?). He was born on May 13, 1809, and he married Charlotte Lee in Springfield, Vermont. Another one of those children, Jonas Amos Martin (1821–1862), grew up in Vermont, married Marion Betts (1829–1913), and worked as a ship's carpenter in Brooklyn. Jonas and Marion raised a son, George Washington Martin, Sr. (1847–1910), who was trained in engineering, rose to prominence in the commercial enterprise known as the Produce Exchange and served as Brooklyn's Superintendent of Street Repairs in the Department of City Works. In October 1869 he married Emma Frances De Revere (1853–1910). George and Emma lived for many years in her parents' home in Macdonough Street, Brooklyn. At that time Macdonough Street was designated as belonging to that exclusive part of Brooklyn known as Stuyvesant Heights, that featured brownstone townhouses. They raised a daughter, Emma Frances Martin (1874–1921), and their son George Washington Martin, Jr. (1876–1948).

== Education, early life and marriages ==
Martin was educated at the Mohegan Lake School in Peekskill, New York. He then studied the law at Yale University and graduated with the LLB degree in 1897. He entered the legal profession and served for five and a half years in Kings County as an assistant District attorney with John F. Clark. When that political appointment ended, he then became a partner in the law firm of Martin and Kesselman, which was situated at 215 Montague Street, Brooklyn. Here he developed a high-profile reputation throughout Kings County as a criminal trial lawyer.

Martin was married around 1900 to Susie L. Phillips and together they had a daughter Audrey born around 1904. However Martin's wife died prematurely. According to the 1910 US Federal Census, Martin and his daughter Audrey were living with his mother Emma, his sister Emma Rice (née Martin) and his brother-in-law John De Revere.

In the middle part of 1910 Martin remarried. His second wife was Maud Ainsworth (June 14, 1892 – February 28, 1966). She was born in Chicago as the fourth child of Joseph Charles Ainsworth and Annie Young. However, she was adopted by her aunt Emma Young McIntyre and James McIntyre. Her adoptive parents were both theatrical stars. Emma McIntyre was known on stage in the late nineteenth century as "Maude Clifford" the dancer and balladeer. James McIntyre was one member of the famous vaudevillian duo of Heath and McIntyre. The duo were the first stars of the stage to act as "black and white" minstrels, "black-face comedy", and were credited with introducing tap-dancing to Broadway.

There were six children born to the second marriage: James McIntyre Martin (1912–2003), Peggy Martin (1915–1986), Jean Martin (1916–2006), Betsy Martin (1919–2001), George Washington Martin III (1921–1985), and Walter Ralston Martin (1928–1989) of the Christian countercult movement.

Audrey Martin, the daughter of his first marriage, grew up with her half-siblings and around 1928 married John Francis Oberry (1904–1979), however she died in 1929 in childbirth. That child, Audrey Martin Oberry (1929–1939), was then adopted by her grandparents Maud and George Martin, because her father was financially incapable of supporting her. His granddaughter suffered from heart disease owing to a streptococcus infection at birth.

The family lived from around 1910 until early 1930 in Macdonough Street, and then during 1930 relocated to Bainbridge Street, Brooklyn. Martin, his wife and younger children resided in Bainbridge Street for many years. Toward the end of his life Martin and his wife resided in Clinton Street, Brooklyn.

On September 12, 1918, Martin was conscripted for military service in the U.S. Army. However, he never saw active duty in World War I as the Armistice was reached two months after his enlistment.

== County judge ==
Martin was an active member of the Democratic party in Brooklyn and sought election for a judicial post on its Kings County ticket. In 1920 the New York state governor Al Smith appointed Martin to a vacant position on the Kings County bench. In November 1921 he was successful in his election bid and was appointed to a six-year term of office as a county judge. In 1927 he was elected again and on this occasion was appointed to a term of fourteen years in office.

During his judicial service Martin presided over many criminal cases brought before the county court. Cases that were presented before him ranged from robbery, assaults and extortion perpetrated by young offenders through to major murder trials involving gangs. The trials he presided over were often reported on The New York Times and in other newspapers such as the Syracuse Herald.

== Lifestyle ==
As a prominent member of Brooklyn society and the judiciary, and as a Democratic party member, Martin was acquainted with notable contemporaries of his such as Franklin D. Roosevelt, the Brooklyn banker Herbert Losee, and the Long Island oyster farmer and entrepreneur Royal Toner. Martin was a member of the Episcopalian church, and was related to the Methodist Episcopal minister Reverend Dr. William Wallace Martin of Nashville, Tennessee. Although he belonged to the Episcopalian church, Martin's second wife was a Roman Catholic. He had his youngest son Walter Martin baptized as an Episcopalian, but arranged for his school education in a Catholic school and then at the evangelical The Stony Brook School. He maintained friendly relationships with many Catholics, and in 1922 was a guest speaker at the Brooklyn chapter of the Knights of Columbus.

Martin employed various European immigrants as household servants in his Brooklyn home for many years. He also owned a summer vacation home in Water Mill, New York, on Long Island. Throughout much of Martin's life he wasted much of his salary in excessive spending, regularly gambled on horse races, and was often the victim of his own poor judgment in risky business investments.

In the 1920s he accepted a post on the board of directors of the Foreign Petroleum Corporation only to subsequently discover the company was a phony. He obtained stock in Filmland Incorporated and in the Bayside Amusement Company, and these two organizations had ostensibly earmarked property for the development of a theater complex on Long Island. He also held shares and a directorship in the Buckmoran Realty Corporation. These various business ventures failed leaving Martin with lost income and many accumulated debts. Martin's financial problems were further compounded by two household mortgages, general living expenses, and medical costs associated with the treatment of his granddaughter Audrey's heart disease. Martin himself also underwent regular hospital treatment for diabetes.

In 1930 the Federal grand jury for the Eastern District of New York conducted a three-month investigation into Martin's business affairs. The grand jury did not find any grounds to warrant any indictments against Martin. However, in May 1931 the Supreme Court Justice Faber directed that Martin and his business partner had to repay the sum of twenty-four thousand dollars to a defunct company.

== Attempted impeachment ==
In the late 1930s John Harlan Amen was appointed as a special assistant Attorney General to investigate corruption among both the Brooklyn police and judiciary. Amen was the son-in-law of the former President Grover Cleveland and later in life served as a prosecutor at the Nuremberg trials of Nazi war criminals.

During that investigation into judicial corruption Amen examined the trial of Dr Louis Duke who was charged with practicing illegal abortions. Judge Martin had presided over the case and dismissed the charges. In April 1939 Amen gathered evidence of judicial bribes involving a number of people in the legal profession connected with Dr Duke, including Assistant District Attorney Francis A. Madden and Assistant District Attorney William F. Guinness.

Amen also had Martin indicted on bribery charges. The case against Martin proceeded to trial but the jury found no evidence to sustain the bribery charges and he was exonerated.

In July 1939 the New York state Governor Herbert H. Lehman received formal complaints from both the New York City Mayor Fiorello H. La Guardia and from Amen concerning the conduct of Judge Martin. Governor Lehman then ordered that a formal petition of impeachment be presented to the New York state senate. Under the provisions of Section 6, Article 9 of the New York state constitution the senate was empowered to remove a judicial officer after a two-thirds vote majority is obtained. This was the first time in seventy years that a request for the impeachment of a judicial officer had arisen in the history of New York.

The charges laid against Martin included that he had corruptly used his office to receive gifts of money from attorneys who appeared in cases before him, and that he had serious defects of character rendering him unfit to serve on the bench. The hearings proceeded before the state senate between September and November 1939. In the course of the proceedings Martin's business affairs and bad debts were examined for evidence of corruption. His personal relationships with court officers and lawyers who had been found guilty of bribery were also examined, as was his friendship with the notorious underworld "slot machine king" Leo P. Byk.

On November 16, 1939, the senate voted 28 to 19 to retain Judge Martin on the bench thus clearing him of the charges for impeachment. The entire proceedings of the senate hearings, together with the written evidences presented against Martin, amounted to over 1,700 pages, which were subsequently bound in book form in 1959 and deposited on file in the law library of Yale University.

In April 1940 Martin resumed his position on the bench until his term expired in 1941. By that time the Democrats had evidently come to regard Martin as a political liability, and so they dropped Martin from their county election ticket in August 1941.

== Death ==
Martin then resumed his private law practice until his death in 1948. He was survived by his wife and six children, and was buried in Southampton Cemetery on Long Island.

== Official records ==
- "Gilbert De Revere, Mary A. De Revere, John De Revere, George W. Martin and Emma F. Martin", in the Ninth Census of the United States 1870, Kings County, New York, 21st Ward, Page no. 85, records available to subscribers at ancestry.com
- "Emma F. Martin, George W. Martin, Audrey Martin" in the Thirteenth Census of the United States 1910, Kings County, New York, 23rd Ward, Enumeration District 618, Sheet 7B, records available to subscribers at ancestry.com
- "James McIntyre, Emma McIntyre, Maud McIntyre [adopted daughter]" in the Thirteenth Census of the United States 1910, Kings County, New York, 32 Ward, Enumeration District 1000, Sheet 9B, records available to subscribers at ancestry.com
- "George W. Martin, Maud Martin, Audrey Martin, James Martin, Peggy Martin, Jean Martin and Betty Martin" in the Fourteenth Census of the United States 1920, Kings County, New York, Enumeration District 292, Sheet 3A, records available to subscribers at ancestry.com
- "George Martin, Maud Martin, James Martin, Peggy Martin, Jean Martin, Betsy Martin, George Martin, Walter Martin and Audrey Oberry" in the Fifteenth Census of the United States 1930, Kings County, New York, Enumeration District 24-274, Sheet 10A, records available to subscribers at ancestry.com
- "Joseph Ainsworth and Annie Ainsworth" in the Twelfth Census of the United States 1900, Cook County, Chicago, Illinois, Ward 18, Enumeration District 579, Sheet 7B, records available to subscribers at ancestry.com
- "John F. Oberry", in the Fourteenth Census of the United States 1920, Kings County, New York, Enumeration District 293, Sheet 7A, records available to subscribers at ancestry.com
- "John Francis Oberry", U.S. World War II Army Enlistment Records, 1938–1946, records available to subscribers at ancestry.com
