= Martha Ballard =

American midwife, healer and diarist (1735–1812)

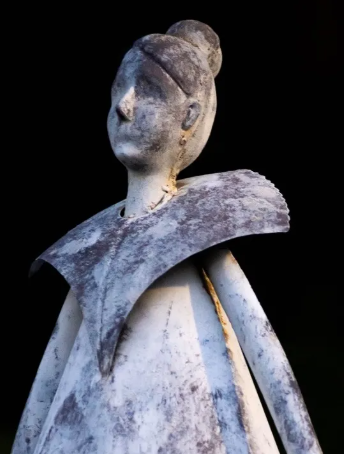
- Artist representation of the proposed Martha Ballard memorial statue to be erected in Mill Park, Augusta Maine.
- Born: Martha Moore; February 9, 1735; Oxford, Province of Massachusetts
- Died: May 7, 1812 (aged 77); Hallowell, Maine, US
- Occupations: Midwife, healer, mortician
- Known for: Diary with 10,000 entries kept over 27 years
- Spouse: Ephraim Ballard (m. 19 December 1754)
- Children: 9
- Relatives: Clara Barton; Mary Hobart

Martha Moore Ballard (February 9, 1735 – May 7, 1812) was an American midwife, healer, and diarist. Unusual for the time, Ballard kept a diary with hundreds of entries over nearly three decades, which has provided historians with invaluable insight into colonial frontier-women's lives.

Ballard was made famous by the publication of A Midwife's Tale: The Life of Martha Ballard based on her diary, 1785–1812 by historian Laurel Thatcher Ulrich in 1990.

== Early life and family ==
Martha Moore was born in Oxford, Province of Massachusetts, on February 9, 1735, to the family of Elijah Moore and Dorothy Learned Moore. There is little known about her childhood, education, and life before she began keeping her diary at age 50, but it is known that her family had medical links. Her uncle Abijah Moore and brother-in-law Stephen Barton were both physicians. In addition, her family is linked to Clara Barton, founder of the American Red Cross and granddaughter of Ballard's sister. She married Ephraim Ballard, a land surveyor, in 1754. The couple had nine children between 1756 and 1779, losing three of them to a diphtheria epidemic in Oxford between June 17 and July 5, 1769.

Ballard moved to the Kennebec Valley in Maine in 1777, two years after her husband moved there for surveying. There, Ballard earned an income as a midwife until her old age. She and her family experienced difficult times during 1803–1804, when her husband was imprisoned for debt and her son was indicted for fraud.

== Midwifery and medical history ==
Ballard never received any formal medical training, but her methods of treating local maladies seem to have been a culmination of her experience as a colonial woman. She was, in many ways, an herbalist. She harvested herbs, creating teas, salves, syrups and vapors to treat anything from a cough to an aching limb. This type of medicine was practiced often by women as they were not allowed to attend medical school. Thus, books such as The Compleat Housewife: OR, Accomplish'd Gentlewoman's Companion accompanied many women in their daily medical tasks. Ballard never mentions any such books in her writing, implying she must have gained her medical knowledge through her life's experience as opposed to education.

Ballard delivered 816 babies over the 27 years that she wrote her diary and was present at more than 1,000 births; the mortality rates of infants and mothers that she visited were ordinary for the United States before the 1940s. Ballard was among community medical personnel, with numerous male doctors often called as well as Ballard at births; however, male physicians could override midwives when they wished to, despite the experience and expertise of the midwife. Ballard was sometimes called to observe autopsies and recorded 85 instances of what she called "desections" in her diary. She also took testimonies from unwed mothers that were used in paternity suits. In addition to her medical and judicial responsibilities, Ballard frequently carried out tasks such as trading, weaving, and social visits.

== Legal context ==
In addition to aiding in births and illnesses, the time that she spent with patients was often used in the local court systems as expert testimony.

She often weighed in on paternity cases in Hallowell. Under a 1668 Massachusetts law, midwives were often asked to pressure young unwed mothers into naming the father of their child in the throes of labor, an action which Ballard frequently participated in. Ulrich notes that "for thirteen of the twenty" out-of-wedlock births Ballard had attended, she had "taken testimony" of the father in accordance with the laws. It appears that these records were not taken to shame women for participating in premarital sex, but more so to prevent the state from having to support children with unknown parentage.

=== Foster case ===
Martha Ballard served as a witness in the trial of Judge Joseph North in 1789 held at Pownalborough Courthouse. In this case, Rebecca Foster, the wife of a local minister, Issac Foster, claimed to have been brutally "ravisht" by a local judge of Hallowell and two other men.

At first not believing her due to the social standing of the judge, Ballard began to serve as a witness for the case, providing crucial contextual evidence to the validity of Foster's accusation. Foster began to confide in Ballard, reporting her fear of the abuses by the local men. In her diary, Ballard writes that "shee [Rebecca] had received great abuses from people unknown to her," and even experienced groups of men throwing rocks at the windows of her home. Ballard was not one for judgement or gossip about the goings on in Hallowell so it was out of character for her when Ulrich writes that it was "the great surprise" when Judge North was acquitted. This trial was a significant event for the tiny town of Hallowell and was born out of dislike for Mr. Issac Foster due to his unorthodox preaching style and religious history. In the event of Rebecca Foster’s rape and accusation of the Colonel Judge North, the town inevitably turned their backs on the family, resulting in their flight from Hallowell shortly after the trial.

The occurrence and sentiment around the trial of Mrs. Foster follows very closely the way in which many rape trials at the time were treated. If reported, these women's cases were largely ignored or treated with disdain, so much so that there were popular satirical plays made about cases of sexual assault. One of the most notable of these, "The Trial of Atticus, Before Justice Beau, For a Rape" was published in 1771 in Boston and was used to mock Rebecca Foster at the time of her trial.

== Diary ==
From when she was 50 (1785) until her death in 1812, Martha Ballard kept a diary that recorded her work and domestic life in Hallowell on the Kennebec River, District of Maine. The log of daily events, written with a quill pen and homemade ink, records numerous babies delivered and illnesses treated as she travelled by horse or canoe around the Massachusetts frontier in what is today the state of Maine. For 27 years, she wrote in the diary daily, often by candlelight when her family had gone to bed.

The diary consists of more than 1,400 pages, with entries that start with the weather and the time. Many of her early records are short and choppy, but her later entries are longer and detailed. Her writing illustrates struggles and tragedies within her own family and local crimes and scandals. One includes the comment that children in New England are allowed to choose their romantic interest if they were in the same economic class, rare for the time. Many of the people mentioned in the diary do not appear on official records, such as censuses or deeds and probate, and so the diary helps to provide insight into the lives of ordinary people who might otherwise have remained invisible. Because of the scale of the diary, scholars have been able to use digital tools to mine it for information. Such studies have revealed, for instance, that because Ballard's deliveries spike significantly between February and April, her neighbours are most likely to be having sex between May and July.

The last birth that Ballard attended was on April 26, 1812. Ballard's final diary entry, dated May 7th, 1812, ends thusly: "Revd mr Tippin Came and Converst Swetly and made A Prayer adapted to my Case." After Ballard's death, the diary was kept by Dolly Lambard. The diary was then passed on to Dolly's daughters, Sarah Lambard and Hannah Lambard Walcott after Dolly's death in 1861. Sarah Lambard and Hannah Lambard gifted the diary to Ballard's great-great-granddaughter, Mary Hobart, one of the first female US physicians to graduate from the New York Infirmary for Women and Children in 1884, the same year that she received the diary.

In 1930, Hobart donated the diary to the Maine State Library in Augusta. Maine State Library promised Hobart a transcript of the diary, but the promise was never fulfilled. Charles Elventon Nash included parts of the diary in a proposed two-volume history of Augusta, which was kept in a descendant's home for almost 60 years before the descendant offered it to the Maine State Library. Edith Hary took the papers and published The History of Augusta: First Settlements and Early Days As A Town Including The Diary of Mrs. Martha Moore Ballard in 1961. In July 1982, E. Wheaton of the Maine State Archive created a microfilm copy of the diary. Robert R. McCausland and Cynthia MacAlman McCausland later spent ten years producing a verbatim transcription on the diary, which they made freely available online as well as for purchase in hard-copy.

== Representations in Media ==
=== Legacy ===
Ballard's obituary was published on June 9, 1812, in the American Advocate and simply stated:

Died in Augusta, Mrs Martha, consort of Mr Ephraim Ballard, aged 77 years.

=== A Midwife's Tale, by Laurel Thatcher Ulrich (1989) ===
For many years, Martha Ballard's diary was not considered to be of scholarly interest since it was generally dismissed as repetitive and ordinary. However, historian Laurel Thatcher Ulrich saw potential in the diary, realizing how rare Ballard's first-hand account was after having researched a previous book on women in early New England. After eight years of research, Ulrich produced A Midwife's Tale: The Life of Martha Ballard based on her diary, 1785–1812. Each chapter in A Midwife's Tale represents one aspect of the life of a woman in the late 18th century. The overriding theme is the nature of women's work in the context and community. Ulrich stated that:

When I finally was able to connect Martha's work to her world, I could begin to create stories.

Supporting documents construct Ulrich's interpretation of terse and circumspect diary entries, dealing with medical practice and the prevalence of violence and crime. In "A Midwife’s Tale", Ulrich highlights ten key entries from Martha's diary. Ulrich places these entries in a historical context, elevating a seemingly-ordinary woman's life into a key figure of Kennebec.

In 1997, the PBS series The American Experience aired A Midwife's Tale. This documentary film was based upon Ulrich’s book, and Ulrich served as a consultant, script collaborator, and narrator for the film.

=== The Frozen River, by Ariel Lawhon (2023) ===
In 2023, author Ariel Lawhon's The Frozen River was published. The work of fiction was inspired by Martha Ballard's life and, specifically, her role in the 1789 trial of Judge Joseph North.
