= MacArthur (1999 film) =

Television documentary film

- Genre: Documentary
- Written by: Austin Hoyt
- Directed by: Austin Hoyt; Sarah Holt
- Narrated by: David Ogden Stiers
- Music by: Michael Bacon
- Country of origin: United States
- Original language: English

Production
- Producers: Austin Hoyt; Sarah Holt (coproducer)
- Cinematography: Terry Hopkins
- Editors: Bernice K. Schneider; Sarah Holt
- Running time: 240 minutes
- Production company: WGBH Educational Foundation

Original release
- Network: PBS
- Release: May 17, 1999

MacArthur is a 1999 two-part television documentary film about Douglas MacArthur, a United States General of the Army. Produced by PBS for The American Experience (now simply American Experience) documentary program, it recounts the significant events and controversies in MacArthur's life, from childhood to his death in 1964. Written and produced by Austin Hoyt, directed by Hoyt and Sarah Holt, and narrated by David Ogden Stiers, the film first aired on PBS in two parts on May 17 and 18, 1999.

== Interviewees ==
- Stephen E. Ambrose, historian
- Zeneida Quezon Avenceña, daughter of Manuel L. Quezon
- Leon Beck, U.S. Army
- Faubion Bowers, aide to MacArthur
- Tanya Brooks, daughter-in-law
- Alfred X. Burgos, Manila resident
- Charles Canada Jr., friend of Arthur MacArthur Jr.
- Robert Dallek, historian
- John Dower, historian
- Daniel Finn, U.S. Army
- Carol Gluck, historian
- Beate Sirota-Gordon, constitution drafter for Japan
- Richard M. Gordon, U.S. Army
- Joseph C. Harsch, journalist
- Stanley Karnow, author
- Hal Lamar, aide to Admiral Chester Nimitz
- Robert W. Love, Ernest J. King biographer
- Harry J. Maihafer, military historian
- Merrill Pasco, aide to George Marshall
- Geoffrey Perret, biographer
- Carol Petillo, biographer
- Edwin Ramsey, U.S. Army guerilla
- Beth Day Romulo, Manila journalist
- Frank J. Sackton, aide to MacArthur
- Michael Schaller, historian
- Donald Showers, aide to Admiral Nimitz
- Edwin H. Simmons, marine historian
- Mark Stoler, George Marshall biographer
- Stephen Taaffe, historian
- Frank Tremaine, journalist
- Vernon A. Walters, U.S. Army
- Yoshida Yutaka, historian
- Kenneth R. Young, Arthur MacArthur Jr. biographer

== Critical response ==
Walter Goodman of The New York Times gave MacArthur a positive review, stating that "Although far from uncritical, Austin Hoyt's carefully balanced approach does justice to MacArthur's tactical abilities even as it takes account of a political obtuseness that at times verged on megalomania." Shannon Jones of World Socialist Web Site also gave an overall positive review, although with reservations, stating that "To the producers' credit the program attempts to deal with the subject in a serious way. [...] However, as one expects with American television, the commentary, while often informative, does not probe too deeply the political issues raised by Douglas MacArthur's career, nor does the production seriously challenge the image of the general as a 'hero'".

== Home media ==
MacArthur was first released on VHS by PBS on May 11, 1999, a few days before its television broadcast. PBS would later release the film on DVD by February 10, 2004.
