= Jimmy Carter (film) =

2002 television documentary film

- Genre: Documentary
- Written by: Adriana Bosch
- Directed by: Adriana Bosch
- Narrated by: Linda Hunt
- Music by: Mason Daring
- Country of origin: United States
- Original language: English

Production
- Producer: Adriana Bosch
- Cinematography: Michael Chin; Stephen McCarthy
- Editor: James Rutenbeck
- Running time: 180 minutes

Original release
- Network: PBS
- Release: November 11, 2002

Jimmy Carter is a 2002 two-part television documentary film about Jimmy Carter, the 39th President of the United States. Produced by PBS for the American Experience documentary program, it recounts Carter's life from childhood in Georgia to his post-presidency as peacemaker. The film was written, produced, and directed by Adriana Bosch, and was first aired on PBS in two parts on November 11 and 12, 2002.

== Interviewees ==
- Peter Bourne, biographer
- Douglas Brinkley, historian
- Pat Caddell, pollster
- Chip Carter, son
- Dan T. Carter, historian
- Rosalynn Carter, first lady
- Elizabeth Drew, journalist
- Warren Fortson, lawyer
- Betty Glad, political scientist
- E. Stanly Godbold, historian
- Hendrik Hertzberg, speechwriter
- Leroy Johnson, Georgia state senator
- Bert Lance, Advisor
- Walter Mondale, Vice President
- Andrew Young, U.N. ambassador

== Home media ==
Jimmy Carter was first released on VHS by PBS on November 19, 2002, a week after it first aired on television. On March 7, 2006, PBS released the film on DVD. Later, it would also be included in an American Experience DVD box set collecting the program's films about United States presidents, released on August 26, 2008.
