= Garden Pier =

The Garden Pier was a historic pier located in uptown Atlantic City, New Jersey at the northern end of the boardwalk and South New Jersey Ave. The pier was opened on July 19, 1913, and was home to the B.F. Keith's Theatre, Atlantic City Historical Museum and the Atlantic City Art Center. Garden Pier closed for a period of time in 2010 due to damage by hurricanes and then re-renovated in 2012. Garden Pier location was purchased in 2016 by Philadelphia-based developer Bart Blatstein.

== History ==
The Garden Pier opened on July 19, 1913, and had a garden with statues. The pier was home to the B.F. Keith's Theatre which rivaled Broadway at the time. Multiple performers including Douglas Fairbanks and Sophie Tucker. Tobacco Road and George White's Scandals also premiered at the theatre. Due to the number of visitors companies such as Underwood Typewriter Company, Hoover, and Pennsylvania Rubber Company.

In 1921, the first Miss America pageant, then known as the Atlantic City Pageant, was hosted at the pier. The pageant was designed to attract visitors after Labor Day. The pier was damaged in the 1944 Great Atlantic hurricane and reopened in the 1950s. A new art center called Atlantic City Art Center opened when the pier reopened during the Atlantic City's Centennial celebrations as the Garden Pier Civic Center.

In 1985, the Atlantic City Historical Museum opened and displayed 150 years of the city's history. The pier closed in 2010 after hurricane damage and went under extensive renovation in 2012.

Garden Pier location was purchased in March 2016 by Philadelphia-based developer Bart Blatstein. As of the 2019, both the Atlantic City Historical Museum and the Atlantic City Art Center moved and is now a part of the Atlantic City Experience located at the Jim Whelan Boardwalk Hall.
