= Laurel Thatcher Ulrich =

American historian (born 1938)

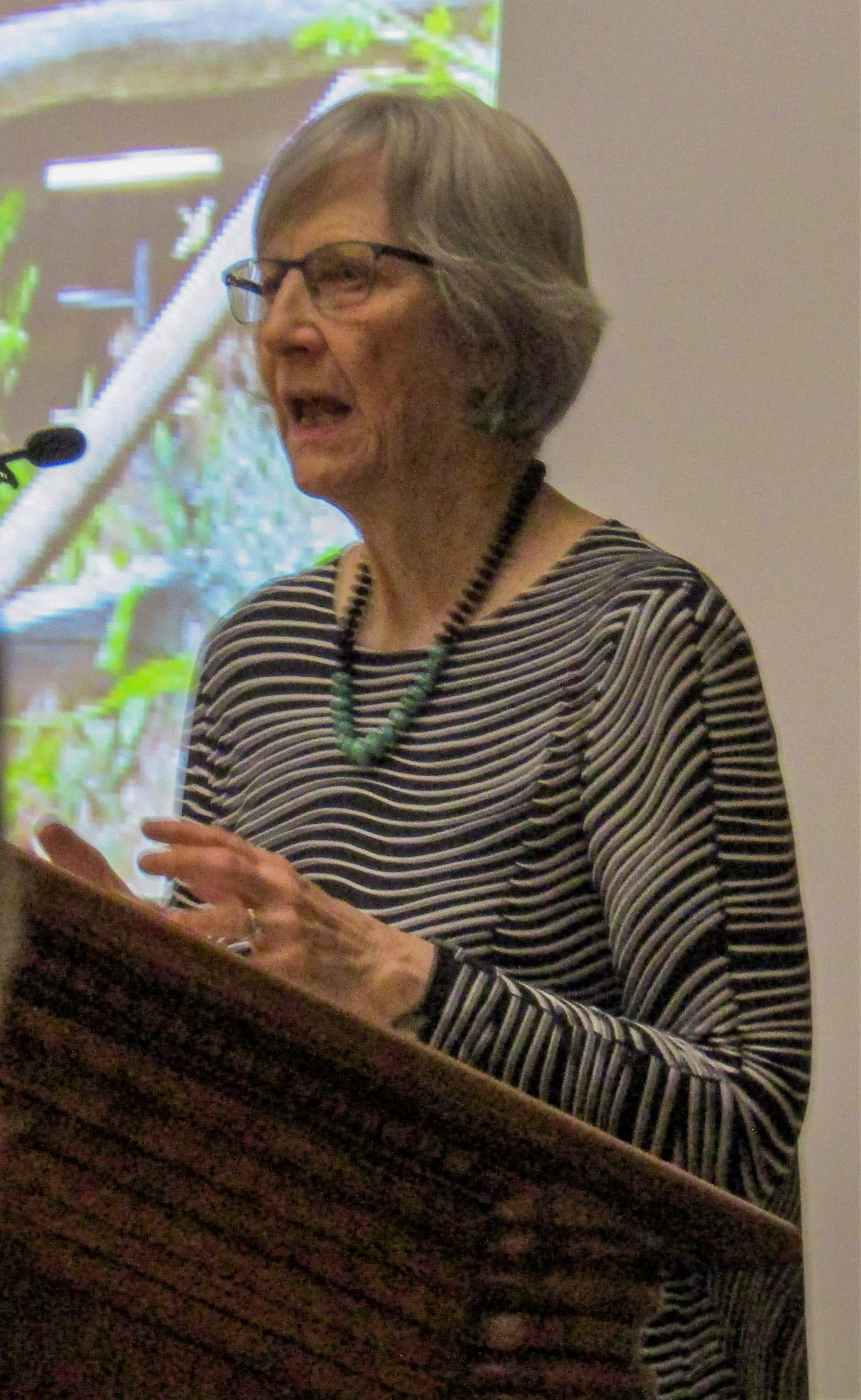
- Ulrich in 2017
- Born: Laurel Thatcher; July 11, 1938 (age 88); Sugar City, Idaho, U.S.
- Title: 300th Anniversary University Professor, Emerita
- Awards: Pulitzer Prize; Bancroft Prize

Academic background
- Education: University of Utah (BA); Simmons University (MA); University of New Hampshire (PhD)

Academic work
- Discipline: History
- Institutions: University of New Hampshire; Harvard University
- Doctoral students: Sarah Pearsall
- Notable works: A Midwife's Tale (1990)

Laurel Thatcher Ulrich (born July 11, 1938) is an American Pulitzer Prize-winning historian specializing in the early history of the United States and the history of women. She joined the faculty of Harvard University in 1995 and in 2006 was appointed 300th Anniversary University Professor. Her approach to history has been described as a tribute to "the silent work of ordinary people". Ulrich was a recipient of a "Genius Grant" from the MacArthur Fellows Program in 1992. Her most famous book, A Midwife's Tale, was later the basis for a PBS documentary film.

== Early life and education ==
Laurel Thatcher was born July 11, 1938, in Sugar City, Idaho, to Alice Siddoway Thatcher and John Kenneth Thatcher, school teacher and superintendent as well as state legislator and farmer. She graduated from the University of Utah, majoring in English and journalism, and gave the valedictory speech at commencement.

In 1971, she earned a master's degree in English at Simmons University, and subsequently a doctorate in history from the University of New Hampshire, in 1980.

== Career ==
After completing her Ph.D., Ulrich joined the faculty at the University of New Hampshire. Starting as a graduate assistant, she was eventually a tenured faculty member at UNH until 1995 when she joined the Harvard University faculty. In 1991, Ulrich received both the Pulitzer Prize and the Bancroft Prize for her work of history, A Midwife's Tale. In 1992, the MacArthur Foundation chose Ulrich as a MacArthur Fellow.

She was appointed James Duncan Phillips Professor of Early American History at Harvard University and was the director of the Charles Warren Center of Studies in American History. She was elected to the American Philosophical Society in 2003. She also served as President of the American Historical Association from 2009 to 2010, and of the Mormon History Association from 2014 to 2015. In 2006, Ulrich was appointed Harvard's 300th Anniversary University Professor. She held that professorship until she retired from Harvard in 2018.

=== "Well-behaved women seldom make history." ===
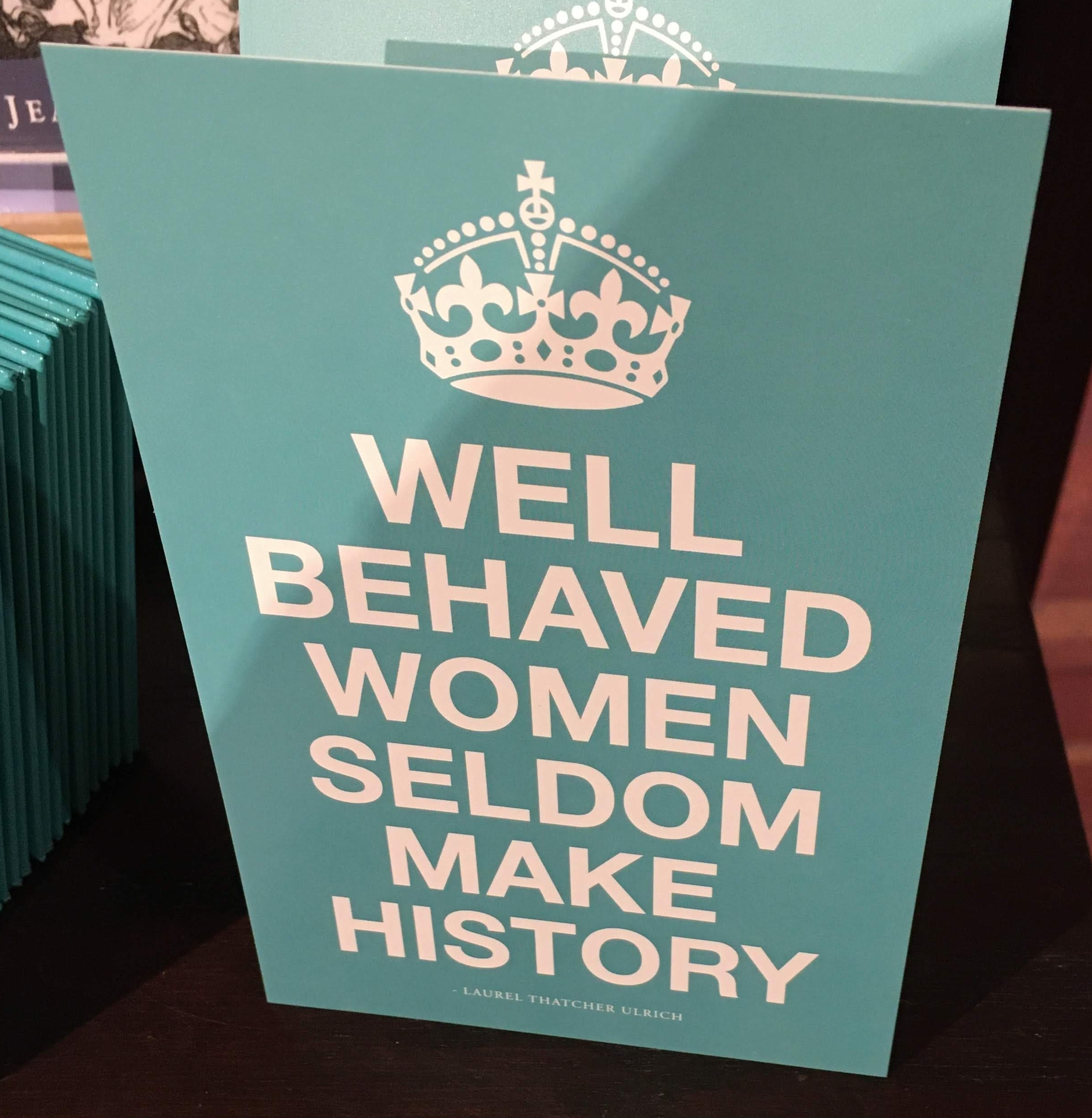
Gift card containing the "Well-behaved women seldom make history" slogan.

In a 1976 scholarly article about little-studied Puritan funeral services, Ulrich coined the phrase "well-behaved women seldom make history." Her point was that well-behaved women are not studied by historians; she did not intend to encourage women to be less "well-behaved". However, when T-shirts, mugs, bumper stickers and cocktail napkins picked up the phrase, it took on new meaning.

In an October 2007 interview, Ulrich said: "It was a weird escape into popular culture. I got constant e-mails about it, and I thought it was humorous. Then I started looking at where it was coming from. Once I turned up as a character in a novel—and a tennis star from India wore the T-shirt at Wimbledon. It seemed like a teaching moment—and so I wrote a book using the title." Well-Behaved Women examines the ways in which women shaped history, citing examples from the lives of Rosa Parks, Christine de Pizan, Elizabeth Cady Stanton, Harriet Tubman, and Virginia Woolf.

=== A Midwife's Tale ===
A Midwife's Tale examines the life of Northern New England midwife Martha Ballard, and provides a vivid examination of ordinary life in the early American republic, including the role of women in the household and local market economy, the nature of marriage and sexual relations, aspects of medical practice, and the prevalence of violence and crime. In this book, Ulrich effectively and simultaneously builds historical knowledge of the colonial world and Martha Ballard's biography.

Ulrich's book received the Pulitzer Prize. A Midwife's Tale also received the Bancroft Prize (prompting a speech by Ulrich which compares her own diary and life to Ballard's), the John H. Dunning Prize, the Joan Kelly Memorial Prize, the Berkshire Conference of Women Historians Book Prize, the Society for Historians of the Early Republic Book Prize, the William Henry Welch Medal of the American Association for the History of Medicine, and the New England Historical Association Award. A Midwife's Tale was later developed into a docudrama film for the PBS series American Experience by producer Laurie Kahn-Levitt and director Richard P. Rogers. The film was based upon both Ulrich's book and her archival process, and Ulrich served as a consultant, script collaborator, and narrator.

=== Other work ===
In January 2017, Ulrich's book A House Full of Females: Plural Marriage and Women's Rights in Early Mormonism, 1835-1870, was released. This text explores Mormon women living in Utah during the 19th century who had entered into plural marriages. Ulrich argues that this system was both complicated and empowering for the women in these relationships.

In 2001, Ulrich wrote The Age of Homespun: Objects and Stories in the Creation of an American Myth, published by Alfred Knopf. Historian John Demos praises the book in his review, "Venturing off in a new and highly original direction, she has put physical objects ― mainly but not entirely textiles ― at the center of her inquiry. The result is, among other things, an exemplary response to a longstanding historians' challenge ― to treat objects, no less than writings, as documents that speak to us from and about the past."

== Personal life ==
While she was an undergraduate student, she married Gael Dennis Ulrich and both graduated from the University of Utah. They lived in Cambridge, Massachusetts, while Gael got his Sci.D. from MIT. As he began his career in chemical engineering, Laurel worked on a Master's Degree in English from Simmons College. They moved to Durham, New Hampshire, in 1970 when Gael was appointed to the University of New Hampshire faculty. Laurel completed a Ph.D. in history at UNH in 1980. Together they had five children.

=== Religion ===
Ulrich describes herself as a feminist and as an active member of the Church of Jesus Christ of Latter-day Saints (Mormon). She has written about her experiences as both a feminist and a Mormon. She co-edited (with Emma Lou Thayne) All God's Critters Got a Place in the Choir, a collection of essays about the lives of Mormon women. Ulrich was an early editor and one of the "foundational leaders" who started Exponent II, an independent newspaper which invited women to write about their experiences as a Latter-day Saint women.

In late 1992, Brigham Young University's board of trustees vetoed without comment a BYU proposal to invite Ulrich to address the annual BYU Women's Conference. Ulrich did give addresses at BYU in 2004 and 2006.

=== First published book ===
A Beginner's Boston, a self-published guidebook, was Laurel Ulrich's first book. Written with the help of other friends, the book raised funds for the women's organization of her church. Its first printing in 1966 sold out quickly, and it was reprinted in 1970 and then again in 1973.

== Selected publications ==
Books

- A House Full of Females: Plural Marriage and Women's Rights in Early Mormonism, 1835–1870. (2017). Alfred A. Knopf, Inc. ISBN 978-0-307-59490-7
- Well-Behaved Women Seldom Make History. (2007). Alfred A. Knopf, Inc. ISBN 978-1-4000-4159-6
- Editor, Yards and Gates: Gender in Harvard and Radcliffe History. (2004). Palgrave Macmillan, ISBN 978-1-4039-6098-6
- The Age of Homespun: Objects and Stories in the Creation of an American Myth. (2001). Alfred A. Knopf, Inc. ISBN 978-0-679-44594-4
- All God's Critters Got a Place in the Choir, a collection of essays coauthored with the Utah poet Emma Lou Thayne. (1995). Aspen Books, ISBN 978-1-56236-226-3
- A Midwife’s Tale: The Life of Martha Ballard based on her diary, 1785–1812. (1990). Alfred A. Knopf, Inc. ISBN 978-0-394-56844-7. Reissued in Vintage paperback, ISBN 978-0-679-73376-8
- Good Wives: Image and Reality in the Lives of Women in Northern New England, 1650–1750. (1982). Alfred A. Knopf, Inc. ISBN 978-0-394-51940-1. Reissued by Vintage (1991), ISBN 978-0-679-73257-0

Online articles

- "How Betsy Ross Became Famous" in Common-Place Vol. 8, No. 1 (October 2007), American Antiquarian Society
- "An American Album, 1857", 2009 Presidential Address to the American Historical Association

== See also ==
- Mormon feminism
