= American Experience season 5 =

American Experience
- Season 5
- No. of episodes: 12

Release
- Original network: PBS
- Original release: September 20, 1992 – March 1, 1993

Season chronology
- ← Previous; Season 4 Next → Season 6

Season five of the television program American Experience originally aired on the PBS network in the United States on September 20, 1992 and concluded on March 1, 1993. This is the fifth season to feature David McCullough as the host. The season contained 12 new episodes and began with the first part of The Kennedys film, "The Father, 1900–1961".

== Episodes ==
No. overall	No. in season	Title	Directed by	Categories	Original release date
57	1	"The Kennedys (Part 1)"	James A. Devinney, David Espar, Marilyn H. Mellowes & Phillip Whitehead	Biographies, Politics, Presidents	September 20, 1992
Part 1: "The Father, 1900–1961"
58	2	"The Kennedys (Part 2)"	David Espar & James A. Devinney	Biographies, Politics, Presidents	September 21, 1992
Part 2: "The Sons, 1961–1980"
59	3	"The Donner Party"	Ric Burns	The American West	October 28, 1992
— (Note: The film episode Liberators: Fighting on Two Fronts in World War II is not shown among an alphabetical listing of films on the American Experience series website. However, the film aired as an American Experience installment on November 11, 1992. WNET later refuted the claim that the racially segregated all-black 761st Tank Battalion and 183rd Engineer Combat Battalion liberated the Nazi death camps Dachau and Buchenwald in April 1945.)	4	"Liberators: Fighting on Two Fronts in World War II"	William Miles & Nina Rosenblum	—	November 11, 1992
60	5	"George Washington: The Man Who Wouldn't Be King"	David Sutherland	Biographies, Presidents	November 18, 1992
61	6	"Last Stand at Little Big Horn"	Paul Stekler	Native American History	November 25, 1992
62	7	"If You Knew Sousa"	Tom Spain	Popular Culture	December 9, 1992
63	8	"Simple Justice"	Helaine Head	Civil Rights	January 18, 1993
The film dramatizes the struggle of Charles Hamilton Houston and Thurgood Marshall to achieve racial justice. The film is in part based on the book, Simple Justice: The History of Brown v. Board of Education and Black America's Struggle for Equality, by Richard Kluger.
64	9	"Knute Rockne and His Fighting Irish"	Diane Garey & Lawrence Hott	Biographies	January 25, 1993
65	10	"Sit Down and Fight"	Charlotte Mitchell Zwerin	Biographies	February 1, 1993
66	11	"Rachel Carson's Silent Spring"	Neil Goodwin	The Natural Environment	February 8, 1993
67	12	"Goin' Back to T–Town"	Samuel D. Pollard & Joyce Vaughn	Biographies, Civil Rights	March 1, 1993
