= American Experience season 1 =

American Experience
- Season 1
- No. of episodes: 16

Release
- Original network: PBS
- Original release: October 4, 1988 – January 17, 1989

Season chronology
- Next → Season 2

Season one of the television program American Experience originally aired on the PBS network in the United States on October 4, 1988 and concluded on January 17, 1989. The season contained 16 new episodes and began with the film The Great San Francisco Earthquake. This is the first season to feature David McCullough as the host, who previously hosted the PBS show Smithsonian World from 1984 to 1988.

== Episodes ==
| No. overall | No. in season | Title | Directed by | Categories | Original release date |
|---|---|---|---|---|---|
| 1 | 1 | "The Great San Francisco Earthquake" | Tom Weidlinger | The Natural Environment | October 4, 1988 |
| 2 | 2 | "Radio Bikini" | Robert Stone | Technology, War | October 11, 1988 |
| 3 | 3 | "Indians, Outlaws, and Angie Debo" | Martha Sandlin | Biographies, Native American History | October 18, 1988 |
| 4 | 4 | "Eric Sevareid's Not So Wild a Dream" (Note: The film episode Eric Sevareid's Not So Wild a Dream is sometimes listed in news reports as Eric Sevareid: Not So Wild a Dream or as Eric Sevareid's "Not So Wild a Dream".) | Frank J. DeMeo & Anthony Potter | Biographies | October 25, 1988 |
| 5 | 5 | "The Life and Times of Rosie the Riveter" | Connie Field | Popular Culture, War | November 1, 1988 |
| 6 | 6 | "Do You Mean There Are Still Real Cowboys?" | Jon Blair | Popular Culture, The American West | November 8, 1988 |
| 7 | 7 | "Kennedy vs. Wallace: A Crisis Up Close" | Robert Drew | Civil Rights, Politics | November 15, 1988 |
| 8 | 8 | "Geronimo and the Apache Resistance" | Neil Goodwin | Native American History | November 22, 1988 |
| 9 | 9 | "Let Us Now Praise Famous Men: Revisited" | Carol Bell | Popular Culture | November 29, 1988 |
| 10 | 10 | "That Rhythm, Those Blues" | George T. Nierenberg | Civil Rights, Popular Culture | December 6, 1988 |
| 11 | 11 | "The Radio Priest" | Irv Drasnin | Popular Culture | December 13, 1988 |
| 12 | 12 | "Hearts and Hands" | Pat Ferrero | Biographies | December 20, 1988 |
| 13 | 13 | "Views of a Vanishing Frontier" | Craig B. Fisher | Native American History, The Natural Environment | December 27, 1988 |
| 14 | 14 | "Eudora Welty: One Writer's Beginnings" | Patchy Wheatley | Biographies | January 3, 1989 |
| 15 | 15 | "The World That Moses Built" | Edward Gray & Mark Obenhaus | Biographies, Technology | January 10, 1989 |
| 16 | 16 | "Sins of Our Mothers" | Matthew Collins | Biographies | January 17, 1989 |
