= Peggy Dennis =

American-Russian journalist, author, and Communist activist

- Born: January 1, 1909
- Died: September 25, 1993
- Occupation: Journalist

Peggy Dennis (January 1, 1909 – September 25, 1993) was an American–Russian journalist, author, and Communist activist known for her association with the Communist Party USA (CPUSA). She wrote a memoir, The Autobiography of an American Communist: A Personal View of a Political Life, that provides information about the CPUSA and the life of its female leaders.

== Early life ==
Dennis was born Regina Karasick on January 1, 1909, in New York City to Russian Jewish immigrants, Meyer and Berta Karasick. The family moved to Los Angeles in 1912 and was part of the local immigrant radical community. At the age of 13, she joined the Communist children's group, organized by her older sister, Mini, with whom she attended the Socialist Party Sunday school. In 1925, upon graduation from Roosevelt High School, she joined the Young Communist League and changed her name to Reggie Carson.

== Political activism ==
Dennis worked in the Communist children's movement on assignment from the CPUSA after leaving Teachers College at the University of California after a year. She married a fellow Communist named Bill, but the marriage didn't last long. She then entered a relationship with Frank Waldron, the educational director for the Communist Party in Southern California, who later became known as Eugene Dennis. The couple lived together for 33 years but never legally married. She had a son, Tim, with Eugene in 1929.

=== Communist movement in the Soviet Union ===
In 1930, Eugene fled to the Soviet Union after being indicted for his labor activities, and Dennis and Tim joined him the next year. After this, he began representation work for the international Communist movement in Moscow, traveling to different countries and helping with the Communist parties struggle. Then, in 1933, Dennis was recognized by the Comintern for her political talents and became an official courier.

In 1935, the couple was ordered to return to the United States, but Tim, who only spoke Russian, was left behind in Moscow. The family never lived together again but saw Tim on several occasions.

=== Return to the United States ===
Upon returning to the United States, Dennis and Eugene settled in Milwaukee, Wisconsin, and later New York City. This is when they adopted the names with which they are known today, that is Peggy and Gene Dennis.

Eugene joined the national leadership of the CPUSA, and she did research and worked on a CP magazine. Their second son, Eugene Jr., was born in 1942. In 1948, Eugene and ten other CPUSA leaders were indicted under the Smith Act, but she gained recognition for her political work as a vocal opponent of McCarthyism and editor of the women's pages of the Daily Worker.

== Post-Communist career and memoir ==
After Eugene's death in 1961, Dennis moved to San Francisco and became foreign affairs editor of People's World. She became a vocal critic of the Soviet Union and the CPUSA's isolation from the US Left. She resigned from the Communist Party in 1976 and continued working as a freelance writer. Her 1977 memoir, The Autobiography of an American Communist: A Personal View of a Political Life, is considered a valuable contribution to the history of the American Communist Party and the experiences of its female leaders.

== Death ==
Dennis was disabled by a severe stroke in 1989 and died four years later at the Jewish Home for the Aged in San Francisco. She was buried next to Eugene at the German Waldheim Cemetery in Chicago in a plot reserved for Communist leaders.

The life of Dennis and Eugene was featured in episode 10 (Love in the Cold War), season 4 of the American Experience documentary directed by David Dugan.
