= American Experience season 4 =

American Experience
- Season 4
- No. of episodes: 13

Release
- Original network: PBS
- Original release: September 30, 1991 – February 17, 1992

Season chronology
- ← Previous; Season 3 Next → Season 5

Season four of the television program American Experience originally aired on the PBS network in the United States on September 30, 1991 and concluded on February 17, 1992. This is the fourth season to feature David McCullough as the host. The season contained 13 new episodes and began with the first two parts of the LBJ film, "Beautiful Texas" and "My Fellow Americans".

== Episodes ==
* Denotes multiple chapters that aired on the same date and share the same episode number

No. overall	No. in season	Title	Directed by	Categories	Original release date
44	1*	"LBJ (Parts 1–2)"	David Grubin	Biographies, Politics, Presidents, War	September 30, 1991
Part 1: "Beautiful Texas"; Part 2: "My Fellow Americans"
45	2*	"LBJ (Parts 3–4)"	David Grubin	Biographies, Politics, Presidents, War	October 1, 1991
Part 3: "We Shall Overcome"; Part 4: "The Last Believer"
46	3	"The Massachusetts 54th Colored Infantry"	Jacqueline Shearer	War	October 14, 1991
47	4	"Scandalous Mayor"	Ken Eluto	Biographies	October 28, 1991
48	5	"The Johnstown Flood"	Charles Guggenheim	The Natural Environment	November 4, 1991
49	6	"Pearl Harbor: Surprise and Remembrance"	Lance Bird, John Crowley & Tom Johnson	War	November 11, 1991
50	7	"G-Men: The Rise of J. Edgar Hoover"	Irv Drasnin	Popular Culture	November 18, 1991
51	8	"Duke Ellington: Reminiscing in Tempo"	Robert Levi	Biographies	December 9, 1991
52	9	"The Quiz Show Scandal"	Michael R. Lawrence	Popular Culture	January 6, 1992
53	10	"Love in the Cold War"	David Dugan & Eric Stange	War	January 13, 1992
54	11	"Wild by Law"	Diane Garey & Lawrence Hott	The Natural Environment	January 27, 1992
55	12	"Barnum's Big Top"	Matthew Collins	Biographies, Popular Culture	February 10, 1992
56	13	"In the White Man's Image"	Christine Lesiak	Native American History	February 17, 1992
