= American Experience season 2 =

American Experience
- Season 2
- No. of episodes: 15

Release
- Original network: PBS
- Original release: October 3, 1989 – January 16, 1990

Season chronology
- ← Previous; Season 1 Next → Season 3

Season two of the television program American Experience originally aired on the PBS network in the United States on October 3, 1989 and concluded on January 16, 1990. This is the second season to feature David McCullough as the host. The season contained 15 new episodes and began with the film The Great Air Race of 1924.

== Episodes ==
No. overall	No. in season	Title	Directed by	Categories	Original release date
17	1	"The Great Air Race of 1924"	David Grubin	Technology	October 3, 1989
18	2	"Demon Rum"	Thomas Lennon	Popular Culture	October 10, 1989
19	3	"A Family Gathering"	Lise Yasui	Biographies, Popular Culture	October 17, 1989
20	4	"The Great War: 1918"	Tom Weidlinger	War	October 31, 1989
21	5	"Forever Baseball"	Irv Drasnin	Popular Culture	November 7, 1989
22	6	"Mr. Sears' Catalogue"	Edward Gray & Mark Obenhaus	Biographies	November 14, 1989
23	7	"Yosemite: The Fate of Heaven"	Jon Else	Native American History, The Natural Environment	November 21, 1989
24	8	"Adam Clayton Powell"	Richard Kilberg	Biographies, Civil Rights, Politics	November 28, 1989
25	9	"Journey to America"	Charles Guggenheim	Popular Culture	December 5, 1989
26	10	"Ballad of a Mountain Man"	David Hoffman	Biographies, Popular Culture	December 12, 1989
27	11	"Ida B. Wells: A Passion for Justice"	William Greaves	Biographies, Civil Rights	December 19, 1989
28	12	"Orphans of the Storm"	Gill Barnes	War	December 26, 1989
29	13	"Forbidden City, USA"	Arthur Dong	Popular Culture	January 2, 1990
30	14	"Battle for Wilderness"	Diane Garey & Lawrence Hott	The American West, The Natural Environment	January 9, 1990
31	15	"Roots of Resistance: The Story of the Underground Railroad"	Orlando Bagwell	Civil Rights	January 16, 1990
