= Augustus Prince =

American nuclear scientist

Augustus "Gus" Prince
- Born: 1924; Philadelphia, Pennsylvania
- Died: 2018
- Education: B.S. University of Pennsylvania, M.S. Drexel Institute of Technology, Ph.D. University of Cincinnati
- Occupation: Nuclear scientist
- Employer: Brookhaven National Laboratory

Augustus “Gus” Prince was an American nuclear scientist at the Brookhaven National Laboratory who developed the standard methodology for the analysis of deformed nuclei. He was the first Black radarman in the Navy, having served as a second class officer radarman during World War II from 1944 to 1945. He died on January 5, 2018.

== Early life and education ==
Prince was born on January 11, 1924, in Philadelphia, Pennsylvania. He grew up in a single-parent household where his mother emphasized discipline and education. His favorite subjects in school were math and science. Upon graduating high school, Prince began working at the Sun Shipyard in Chester, Pennsylvania, to afford a college education. Prince later served on a Navy ship that was built at the same Sun Shipyard.

Prince began his career in the Navy during World War II, 1944 to 1945. He was accepted to radar school and served as the first Black radarman in the Navy. During the war, he served as a radarman on board the escort carrier USS Santee (CVE-29). While on tour, Prince taught algebra to other radar men and would spend his free time training as a middleweight boxer. During his service with the Navy, he earned the rank of second class officer radarman.

Following an honorable discharge from the Navy in 1945, Prince graduated from the University of Pennsylvania in 1952 with a bachelor's degree in science. He then continued his education with a master's degree in physics from the Drexel Institute of Technology, specializing in nuclear physics. Later, Prince obtained his Ph.D. in physics from the University of Cincinnati, where he served as a faculty advisor for the Kappa Alpha Psi fraternity as well as an instructor for several years. From 1962 to 1964, he served as a laboratory instructor for general physics at the University of Cincinnati. In 1964, he taught evening courses in atomic and nuclear physics at the University of Cincinnati while concurrently working as a senior physicist in the nuclear material and propulsion division at General Electric.

== Family life ==
Prince was born to August Prince and Jeanette Prince. He had two brothers, Eugene and Walter. While working at the University of Cincinnati he met his wife Willa L. Prince. With his wife, he had two daughters Gloria Chapman and Marilyn Prince.

== Career ==
In 1966, Prince joined the Brookhaven National Laboratory (BNL) as a nuclear scientist in the data evaluation management group. At BNL, Prince developed the standard method for analyzing deformed nuclei and contributed to the Evaluated Nuclear Data File, along with codes used for the design, operation, and decommissioning of nuclear reactors. During his time at BNL, he also served as a consultant on France's nuclear physics program, carrying out theoretical nuclear investigations for France's Atomic Energy Commission.

Prince retired from BNL in 1993, but continued to drive recruitment of minority students for BNL. After retiring to Florida, he became an adjunct professor of mathematics at the Daytona Beach Community College and tutored at Flagler-Palm Coast High School.

== See also ==
- Racial segregation in the United States Armed Forces
