= Simple Justice =

Book by Richard Kluger

Simple Justice: The History of Brown v. Board of Education and Black America's Struggle for Equality
- First edition
- Author: Richard Kluger
- Genre: Legal history
- Published: 1975 (Alfred A. Knopf)
- Publication place: United States
- Pages: 823 (1st ed.)
- ISBN: 0-394-47289-6
- OCLC: 1602027
- Dewey Decimal: 344/.73/0798
- LC Class: KF4155 .K55 1976

Simple Justice: The History of Brown v. Board of Education and Black America's Struggle for Equality, written by Richard Kluger and published by Alfred A. Knopf in two volumes 1975 and in a single-volume edition in 1976, was a finalist for the 1977 National Book Award in the History category. It is a detailed history of the litigation leading up to the United States Supreme Court decision in Brown v. Board of Education (1954) and its aftermath. The book has been called "a classic of legal history." On January 18, 1993, a documentary based on the book was broadcast as an episode of the American Experience series during the fifth season. A revised and expanded edition was published in 2004.

== Content ==
Simple Justice traces the legal campaign against racial segregation in American public education that culminated in the Supreme Court's 1954 decision in Brown v. Board of Education. Kluger places the litigation within the broader history of race relations in the United States, discussing the development of Jim Crow, the competing approaches of Booker T. Washington and W. E. B. Du Bois, and the legal doctrine of separate but equal.

A major focus of the book is the long-term legal strategy developed by lawyers associated with the NAACP Legal Defense and Educational Fund and its predecessors. Kluger recounts the work of Charles Hamilton Houston, Thurgood Marshall and other attorneys who challenged segregation through a series of cases involving unequal educational opportunities before mounting a direct challenge to segregation itself. The narrative also describes the plaintiffs and families who participated in the litigation and the personal risks they faced.

Kluger conducted extensive research for the book, including interviews with people who had participated in the legal campaign. Kirkus Reviews reported that he interviewed 135 people involved in major civil-rights cases. The resulting narrative combines legal history with biographical accounts of lawyers, judges, plaintiffs and other participants in the struggle over school segregation.

The book follows the development of the litigation through the Supreme Court's consideration of Brown, including the roles of the justices and the effort to produce a unanimous decision. It also examines the relationship between the legal campaign against segregated education and the broader struggle for racial equality in the United States.

== Reception ==
Simple Justice received extensive attention from legal scholars and reviewers following its publication. Writing in the Yale Law Journal, former U.S. Assistant Attorney General Burke Marshall praised the book's account of the lawyers and plaintiffs involved in the campaign against segregation, while also arguing that Kluger's treatment did not always fully reflect the complexities of legal processes and the Supreme Court.

The Harvard Law Review published a review of the book in 1976 by Edward N. Beiser. Time also reviewed the book in 1976, describing its account of the events surrounding Brown and the people involved in the litigation.

The book was a finalist for the 1976 National Book Critics Circle Award for General Nonfiction. It received the 1977 Anisfield-Wolf Book Award for nonfiction.

== Later edition ==
A revised and expanded edition of Simple Justice was published in 2004 to coincide with the 50th anniversary of the Brown decision. Kluger added a final chapter addressing developments since the original publication, including the subsequent course of civil rights and legal controversies involving affirmative action.
