= American Experience season 3 =

American Experience
- Season 3
- No. of episodes: 12

Release
- Original network: PBS
- Original release: October 1, 1990 – February 4, 1991

Season chronology
- ← Previous; Season 2 Next → Season 4

Season three of the television program American Experience originally aired on the PBS network in the United States on October 1, 1990 and concluded on February 4, 1991. This is the third season to feature David McCullough as the host. The season contained 12 new episodes and began with the film Lindbergh.

== Episodes ==
* Denotes multiple chapters that aired on the same date and share the same episode number

No. overall	No. in season	Title	Directed by	Categories	Original release date
32	1	"Lindbergh"	Stephen Ives	Biographies, Popular Culture	October 1, 1990
33	2*	"Nixon (Parts 1–3)"	David Espar (Part 1), Elizabeth Deane (Part 2) & Marilyn H. Mellowes (Part 3)	Biographies, Politics, Presidents	October 15, 1990
Part 1: "The Quest"; Part 2: "Triumph"; Part 3: "The Fall"
34	3	"God Bless America and Poland, Too"	Marian Marzynski	Biographies	October 22, 1990
35	4	"Insanity on Trial"	Matthew Collins	Biographies, Politics	October 29, 1990
36	5	"The Satellite Sky"	Robert Stone	Technology	November 5, 1990
37	6	"The Crash of 1929"	Ellen Hovde & Muffie Meyer	Popular Culture	November 19, 1990
38	7	"The Iron Road"	Neil Goodwin	Technology, The American West	November 26, 1990
39	8	"French Dance Tonight"	Les Blank & Chris Strachwitz	Popular Culture	December 10, 1990
40	9	"Wildcatter: A Story of Texas Oil"	Robert Tranchin	Technology	December 17, 1990
41	10	"After the Crash"	Eric Neudel	Politics	January 7, 1991
42	11	"Los Mineros"	Hector Galan	Civil Rights	January 28, 1991
43	12	"Coney Island"	Ric Burns	Popular Culture, Technology	February 4, 1991
