= Ashes to Ashes (Kluger book) =

1996 nonfiction book by Richard Kluger

Ashes to Ashes: America's Hundred-Year Cigarette War, the Public Health, and the Unabashed Triumph of Philip Morris
- Author: Richard Kluger
- Publisher: Alfred A. Knopf
- Publication date: 1996
- Pages: 807
- ISBN: 0-394-57076-6

Ashes to Ashes: America's Hundred-Year Cigarette War, the Public Health, and the Unabashed Triumph of Philip Morris, written by Richard Kluger and published by Alfred A. Knopf in 1996, won the 1997 Pulitzer Prize for General Nonfiction. It is a detailed account of the American tobacco industry, focusing particularly on the Philip Morris tobacco company.

The book took Kluger seven years to research and write.
