= Craig B. Fisher =

American television producer (1932–2006)

- Born: January 19, 1932; Manila, Philippines
- Died: September 18, 2006 (aged 74); White Plains, New York, United States
- Occupations: Television producer, film producer, writer and director
- Employer(s): NBC, PBS, CBS, ABC, New York University Film School
- Known for: Network and cable television producer.
- Spouse: Helen Ashton (Fisher)
- Children: 4

Craig B. Fisher (January 19, 1932 – September 18, 2006) was an American network and cable television producer. He spent more than 25 years with ABC, CBS, and NBC News Division in New York and Washington, D.C., and more than two decades as a freelance writer and producer. Fisher was responsible for over one thousand hours of live, film and videotape, studio and location television and corporate productions.

He was born in 1932 to Col. Dale D. and Francise Fisher, during Col. Fisher's tour of duty in Manila, the Philippines. Fisher was president of the student government at the University of Maryland, graduating in 1954. As a U.S. Air Force captain, he was a public relations and motion picture officer from 1955 to 1957.

== Today program ==
Fisher created, produced, and wrote numerous NBC network news programs, from hard-news to special events. He was hired by NBC as Associate Producer of Today under Dave Garroway, where, over the years Fisher provided many unknown talents with a first network break, including Simon and Garfunkel’s first national TV appearance. He hired Barbara Walters for her first job in TV as a writer for Hugh Downs, when Downs was the star of Today. Later, Fisher promoted Walters to the on-air “Today Girl.”

== NBC producer ==
Among Fisher’s award-winning programs, his NBC network series included Sunday, a weekly magazine format series; the mini-series Testing; and Exploring, a weekly children’s series featuring art, dance, theater, music, and science segments. Fisher’s other credits as producer/writer were The Smithsonian; Louis Rukeyser’s Business Journal; The New York Times of the Air; Views of a Vanishing Frontier, Anyplace Wild; Washington Redskins Games, a Super Bowl pre-game show; and segments for 20/20. While director of the NBC Science Unit, Fisher wrote, produced, and directed an award-winning series of programs about ecology and anthropology. Fisher was nominated for six Emmy Awards for his nature series for: "The Ice People"; "The Prairie"; "The Great Barrier Reef"; "Man, Beast and The Land"; "The First Americans," and won an Emmy in 1971 for his documentary The Everglades.

== PBS producer ==
For PBS Fisher created, co-wrote, and produced Outerscope, a children's dramatic series to help overcome the effects of prejudice, using actors such as Andrea McCardle and Daniel Stern, with life-sized puppets. Fisher was producer and director of the popular children's series Alphabet Soup. Also for PBS he produced and wrote individual programs for the series Feeling Good and Heritage: Civilization & the Jews.

Fisher wrote and produced The Big Little World of Roman Vishniac, a television special and a 32 screen multi-media program for the Jewish Museum in New York on the work of the celebrated photographer/scientist Roman Vishniac. He produced and co-wrote specials on the opening of the Israel Museum in Jerusalem and on the Museum of Modern Art in New York, interviewing many artists, including Stuart Davis, Georgia O'Keeffe, Alexander Calder, Marc Chagall, Alberto Giacometti, Joan Miró, and Henry Moore. The segments and specials are in MOMA's permanent collections.

== Freelance producer ==
As a freelance writer/producer, Fisher created program segments for Walter Cronkite’s Universe. Fisher wrote an IMAX script for the National Air and Space Museum and produced an exhibits program for the Seashore Museum of the National Park Service documenting a barrier-beach ecosystem. For several years he was media consultant to and primary independent producer for Greenpeace and worked extensively for numerous other non-profit organizations.

== The environment ==
After leaving NBC, Fisher wrote and produced the official version of the report of the White House-appointed Commission on Population Growth and the American Future in 1970 and was media consultant to the commission under the chairman, John D. Rockefeller III. Fisher also testified before Congress on behalf of the National Endowment for the Arts.

== Directorships ==
Fisher was president and executive director of the Writers Guild of America, East and incorporated the WGAE Foundation, established to assist professional screen and television writers. The National Endowment for the Arts was that project’s primary underwriter.

In 2002, he wrote and edited Legacy of Heroes, about medical personnel in World War II, published by the American Academy of Orthopedic Surgeons. Fisher originated and was award chairman for the worldwide Peter Ustinov Writing Competition for the Foundation of the International Council, in association with UNICEF. He was a judge for the International Emmys. He has been President of CADEAN, Phoenix, Osprey, and Kingfisher Productions.

== Awards ==
- Thomas Alva Edison award
- George Foster Peabody Award for “Excellence in Journalism”
- Emmy award,
- Nominated for six Emmy awards
- Writers Guild of America Award: Best Written Documentary
- Eight CINE awards
- A Golden Eagle
- Nine American Film Festival honors
- The Freedom Foundation Medallion
- Chris award
- TV Today and Motion Picture Daily Fame award
- American Film Festival blue ribbon award,
- Adelaide Film Festival certificate,
- IFPA Cindy award
- UNICEF citation.

== Educator ==
Fisher was Adjunct Associate Professor, teaching television, film writing and production at St John's University and was Adjunct Associate Professor at New York University Film School, teaching courses in film and video production, documentary writing and producing theory, and funding for independent productions. For two years he was an instructor at the Maine Media Workshops and director of the MFA/Film program at Maine Media College. He taught master classes in documentary writing and production for the Boston Film & Video Foundation.

== Death ==
Fisher died September 18, 2006, in White Plains, New York, from complications of a heart condition. leaving his wife and four children
