= Racial segregation in the United States Armed Forces =

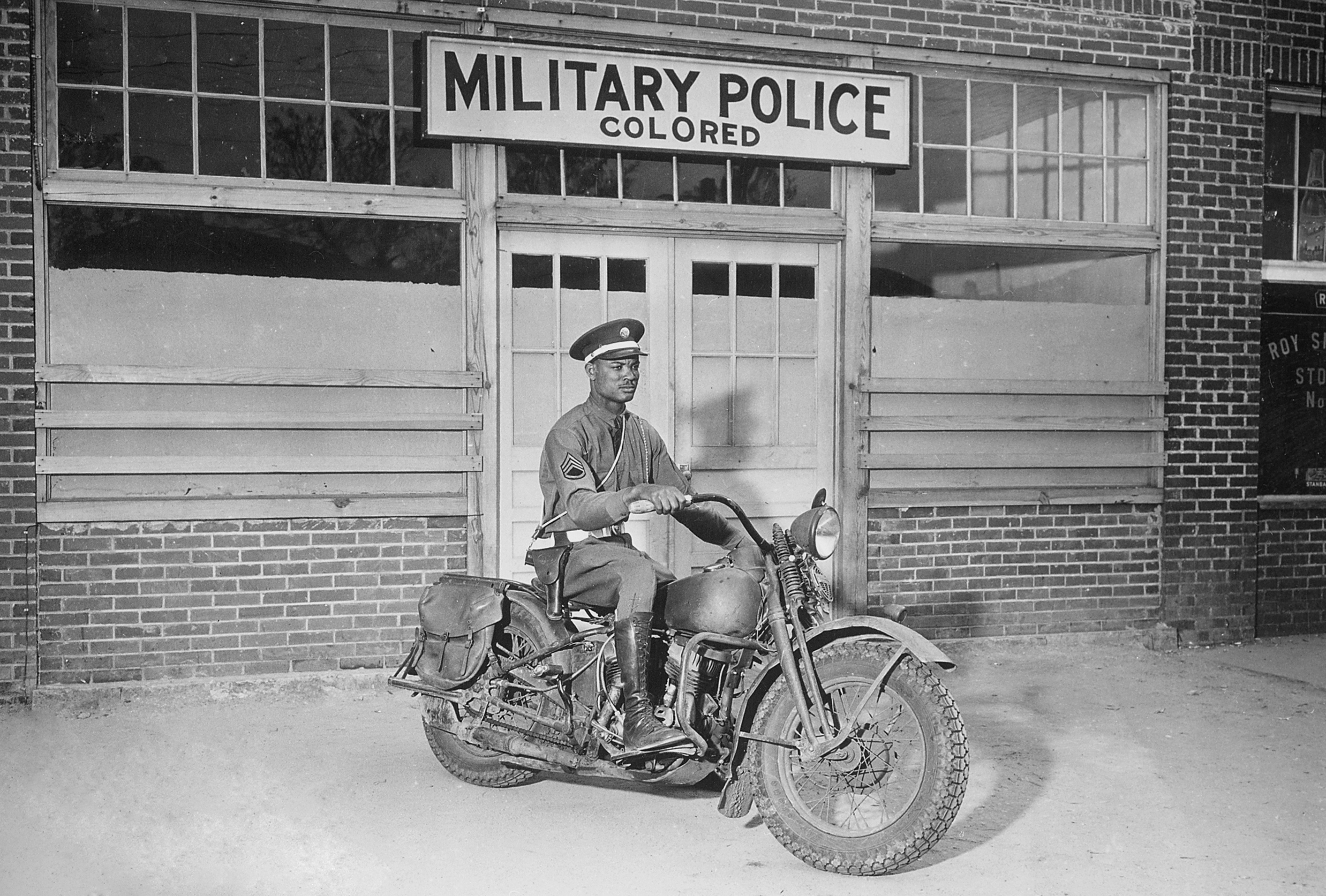
A Black military policeman in front of a "colored" entrance in Columbus, Georgia, 1942

A series of policies were formerly issued by the United States Armed Forces which entailed the segregation of white and non-white American servicemen, prohibitions on the recruitment of people of color and restrictions of ethnic minorities to supporting roles. Since the American Revolutionary War, each branch of the U.S. military implemented differing policies surrounding racial segregation. Racial discrimination in the U.S. military was officially opposed by Harry S. Truman's Executive Order 9981 in 1948. The goal was equality of treatment and opportunity. Jon Taylor says, "The wording of the Executive Order was vague because it neither mentioned segregation or integration." Racial segregation was ended in the mid-1950s.

== American Revolutionary War ==
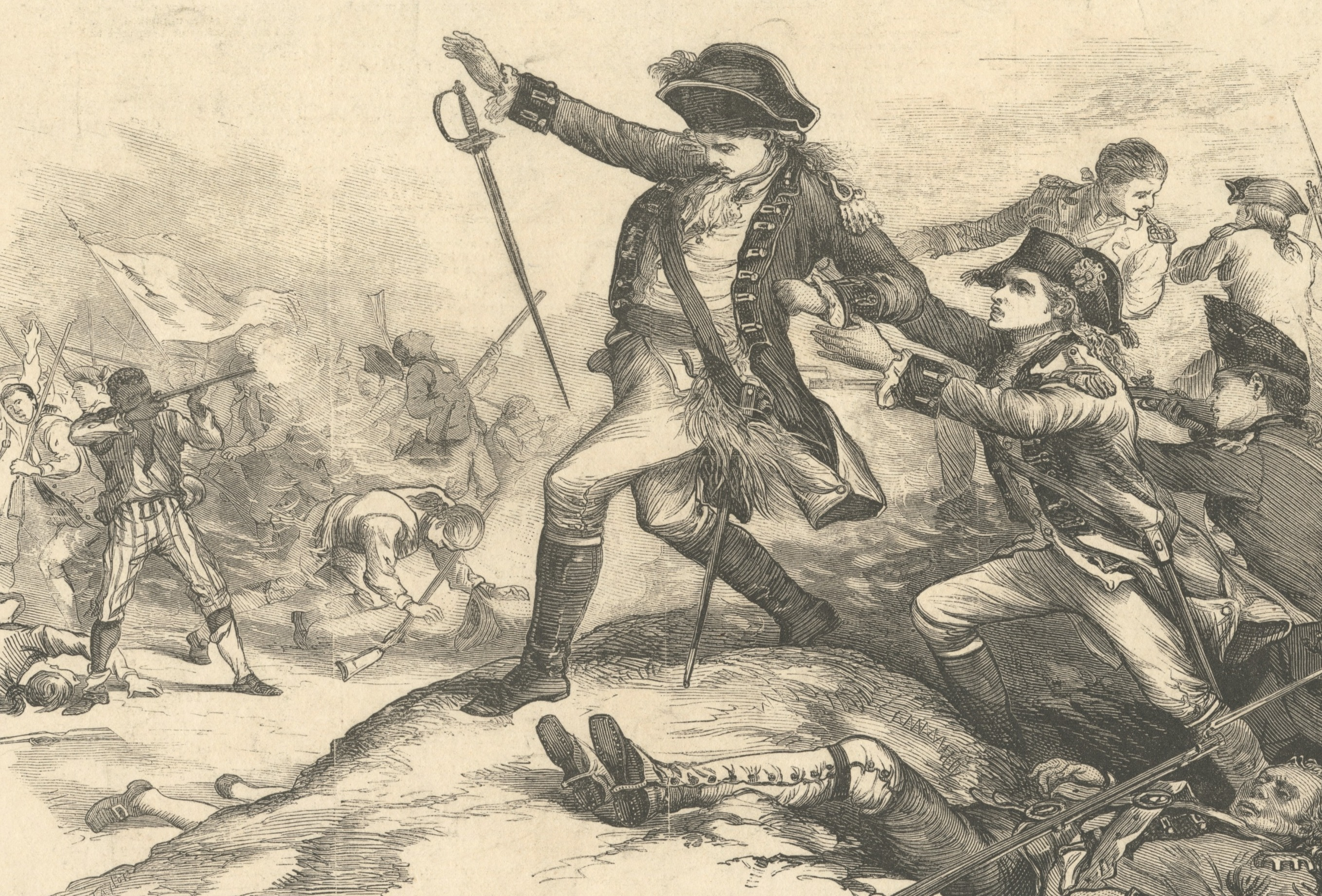
Peter Salem shooting John Pitcairn at the Battle of Bunker Hill

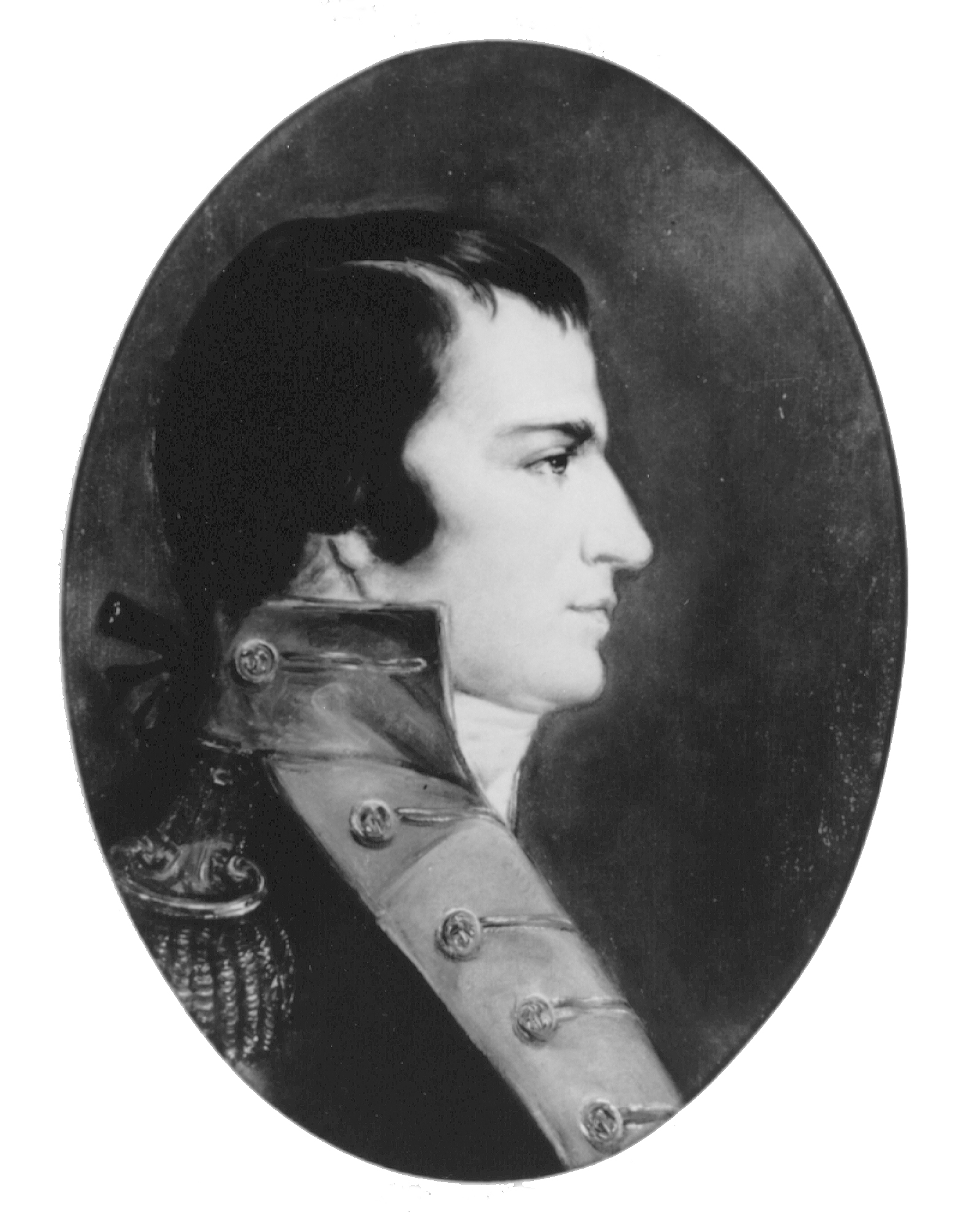
William Ward Burrows I, who enforced a policy against enlisting "Blacks and Mulattoes" into the United States Marine Corps.

During the American Revolutionary War, there were varying opinions surrounding the enlistment of African Americans into the Continental Army. Though Black men had a long history of service in the militias and provincial forces of the Thirteen Colonies during the French and Indian Wars, most Patriots believed that arming Black soldiers would pose a threat to the existing American racial hierarchy and institution of slavery. Despite the death of Crispus Attucks in the 1770 Boston Massacre along with the participation of Black soldiers in the Battles of Lexington and Concord and the Battle of Bunker Hill, Patriot leaders continued to argue against the enlistment of African Americans on racial grounds. Due to fears of potential slave rebellions, one of George Washington's first acts as commander-in-chief of the Continental Army was to sign an order forbidding the recruitment of any Black person into the army. He later rescinded this order, and in total approximately 9,000 African Americans (mostly freedmen from the American North) ended up serving in the Continental Army, most of them in integrated units.

== United States Army ==
After the enactment of the Militia Acts of 1792, the U.S. Army refused to enlist black men, and, with very few exceptions, the prohibition remained in effect until the second year of the Civil War.

=== War of 1812 ===
Approximately a million black people lived in the United States at the outset of the War of 1812. However, the U.S. military remained segregated during the first years of the war, and African Americans remained mostly barred from enlisting. However, after British forces launched several invasions into the United States, Black soldiers began to be recruited by the U.S. authorities. In 1814, 2,000 free Black soldiers were trained in New York, and received the same compensation as their white counterparts. However, due to the U.S. Army' s exclusion policies the majority of black service members either served in the U.S. Navy or escaped to the Royal Navy to gain their freedom.

=== American Civil War ===
The history of African Americans in the Civil War involves 186,097 (7,122 officers, 178,975 enlisted) African American men, forming 163 units, who served in the Union Army. African Americans also served in the Union Navy, with both free African Americans and fugitives from slavery joining the fight.

On the Confederate side, black soldiers, both free and enslaved, were used for labor. The issue of whether to arm them and under what terms became a major source of debate among Southerners. At the start of the war, a Louisiana Confederate militia unit composed of free black soldiers from the extensive New Orleans Creoles of color was raised, but the Confederacy refused their service. On March 13, 1865, the Confederate Congress enacted a statute to allow the enlistment of African Americans, but few were recruited.

Asian and Pacific Islander troops also served with African Americans in the United States Colored Troops, and a few served with white troops.

Native Americans, such as General Stand Watie's Confederate Cherokee Battalion, fought in their own tribal regiments or battalions on both sides of the Civil War.

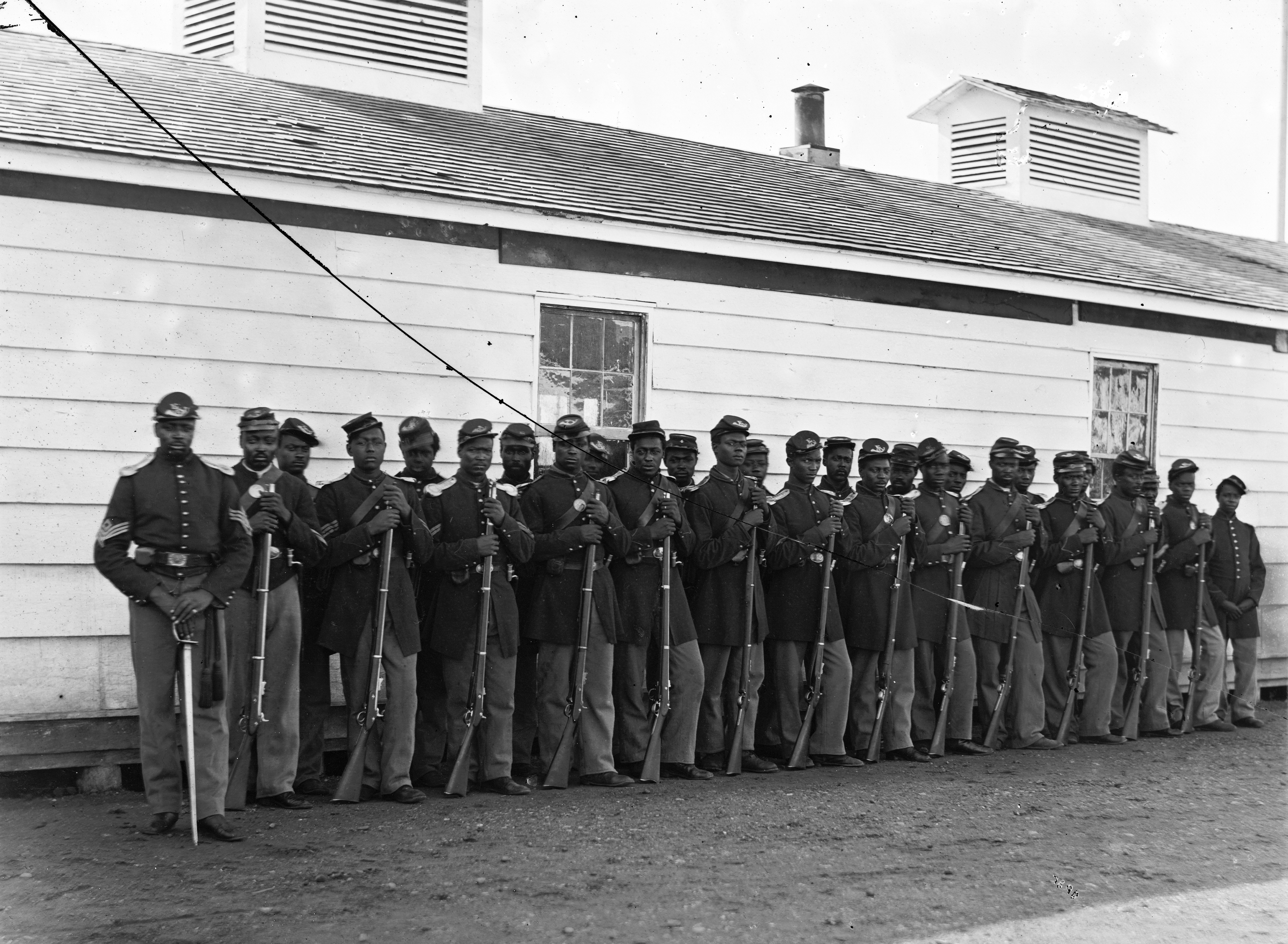
Company E of the 4th Colored Regiment

=== Buffalo Soldiers ===
The Buffalo Soldiers were established by Congress in 1866 as the first peacetime all-black regiments in the regular U.S. Army. They were tasked with guarding settlements on the western frontier; this involved fighting the native people and bandits that frequented and occupied the area. The Buffalo soldiers were paid $13 a month, and maintained some of the lowest desertion rates in the Army.

=== Spanish–American War ===
During the Spanish–American War (1898), the Illinois 8th Infantry National Guard was federalized, and made history when its all-African-American officer corps led the unit in the combat zone.

=== Philippine Scouts ===
In February 1901, Congress passed a law allowing the Commander-in-chief to recruit members of the Filipino community into Army service. Fifty two companies, all from the same regions of the country, were enlisted to push past enemy lines. The Philippine Scouts were known as highly proficient soldiers with low desertion rates; their regiment lasted until the end of World War II, in which they were compelled to surrender to Japanese troops due to a dearth of resources and numbers.

=== World War I ===
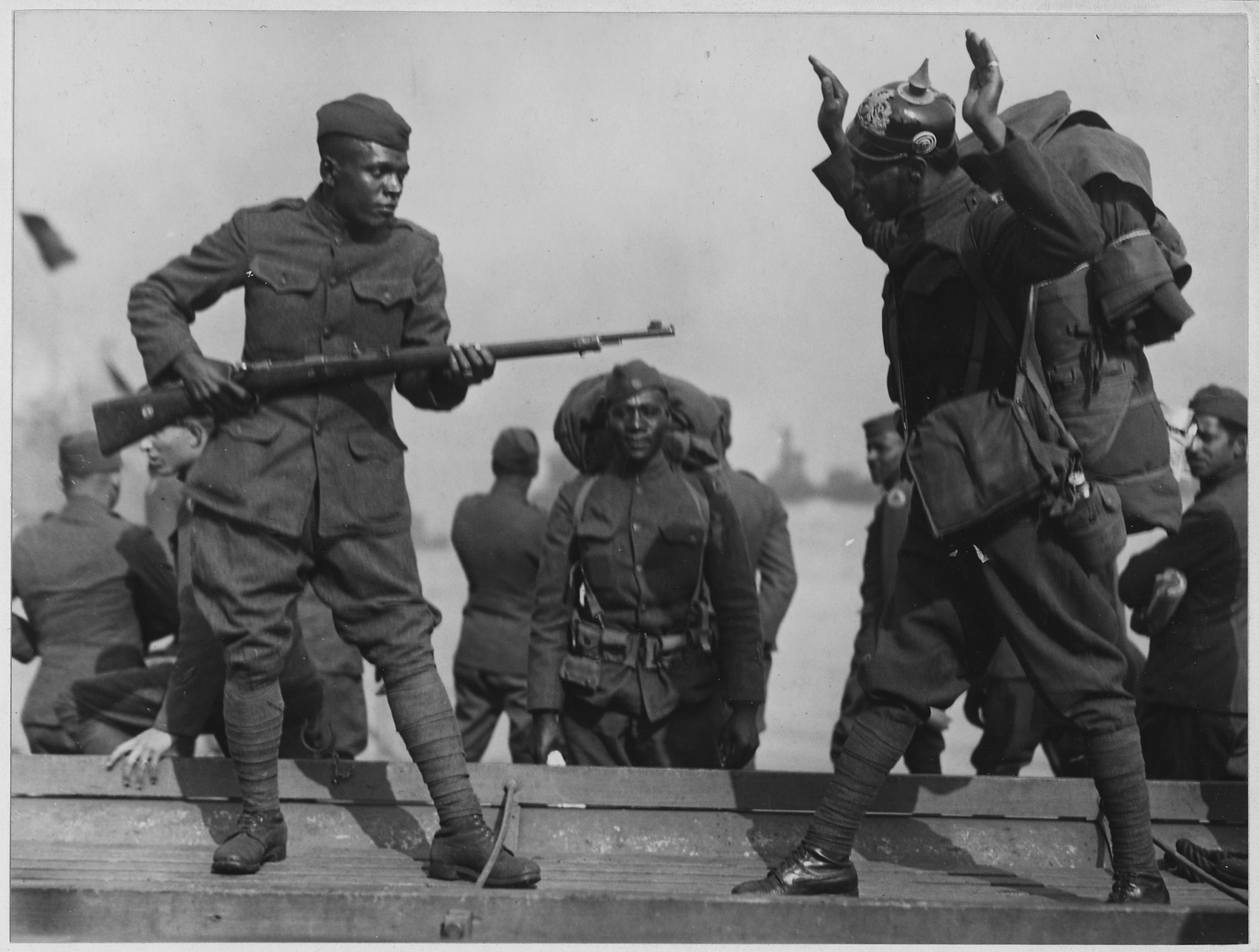
African-American troops of the 505th Engineers

==== African Americans ====
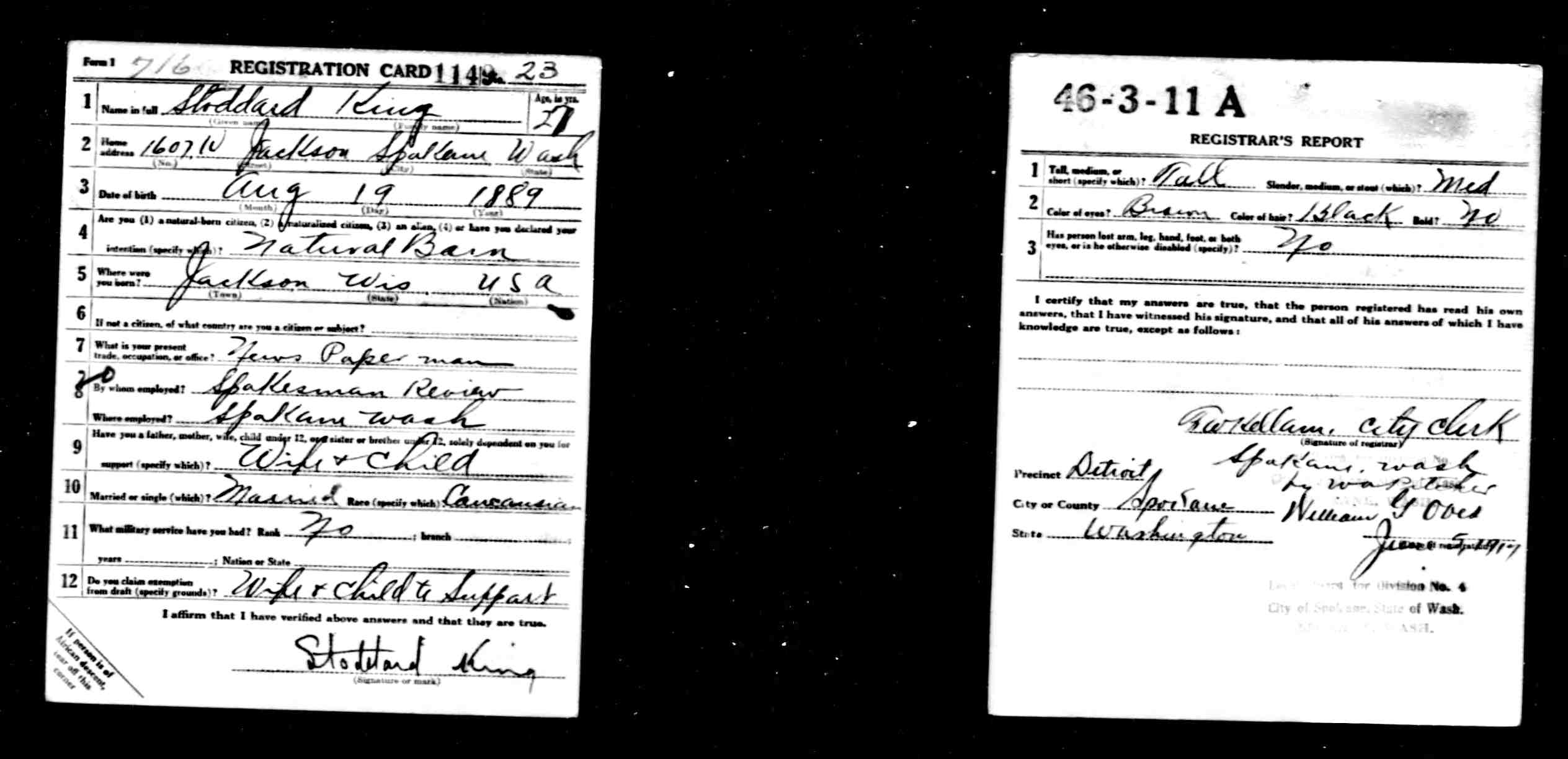
WWI draft card. Lower left corner to be removed by men of African background to help keep military segregated

The American military was entirely segregated for African Americans during World War I. Despite expressed opposition to military training for black Americans by white supremacist politicians such as Sen. James K. Vardaman (D-MS) and Sen. Benjamin Tillman (D-SC), Congress passed the Selective Service Act in May 1917. This mandated draft registry included all male citizens over the age of 21. A total of 290,527 black Americans were ultimately registered for the draft. The rate at which black soldiers were drafted—especially by southern draft boards—was much higher than that of white soldiers. Though black people made up only 10 percent of the United States population at the time, black soldiers made up roughly 13 percent of those drafted. Draft board officials were instructed to tear off the lower left corner of the Selective Service forms filled out by black registrants to mark these for segregated units.

At the start of World War I, there were four regiments composed entirely of black soldiers. Two combat units of African-Americans were established: the 92nd and 93rd Infantry Divisions. The August 1917 Houston Riot of armed African-American soldiers, spurred by racist behavior by Houston police officers, additionally shaped the War Department's decision-making, and the great majority of black soldiers were assigned jobs like the building of roads, unloading of shipping, and other forms of common labor.

Including volunteers, 350,000 African-Americans served in the American Expeditionary Force on the western front, with one combat unit, the 369th Infantry "Hell Fighters from Harlem" being awarded the Croix de Guerre by the French allies for their bravery and competence in combat. The 370th Infantry was given the name "The Black Devils" by the Germans and following their pre-war organization in Illinois, were the only American unit to have black officers.

==== Asian Americans ====
Asian Americans fought in integrated units during World War I, and non-citizens were offered citizenship after the war as a result of their service.

=== World War II ===
During World War II, the United States Army established several new segregated units, and maintained several historic segregated units.

==== African Americans ====
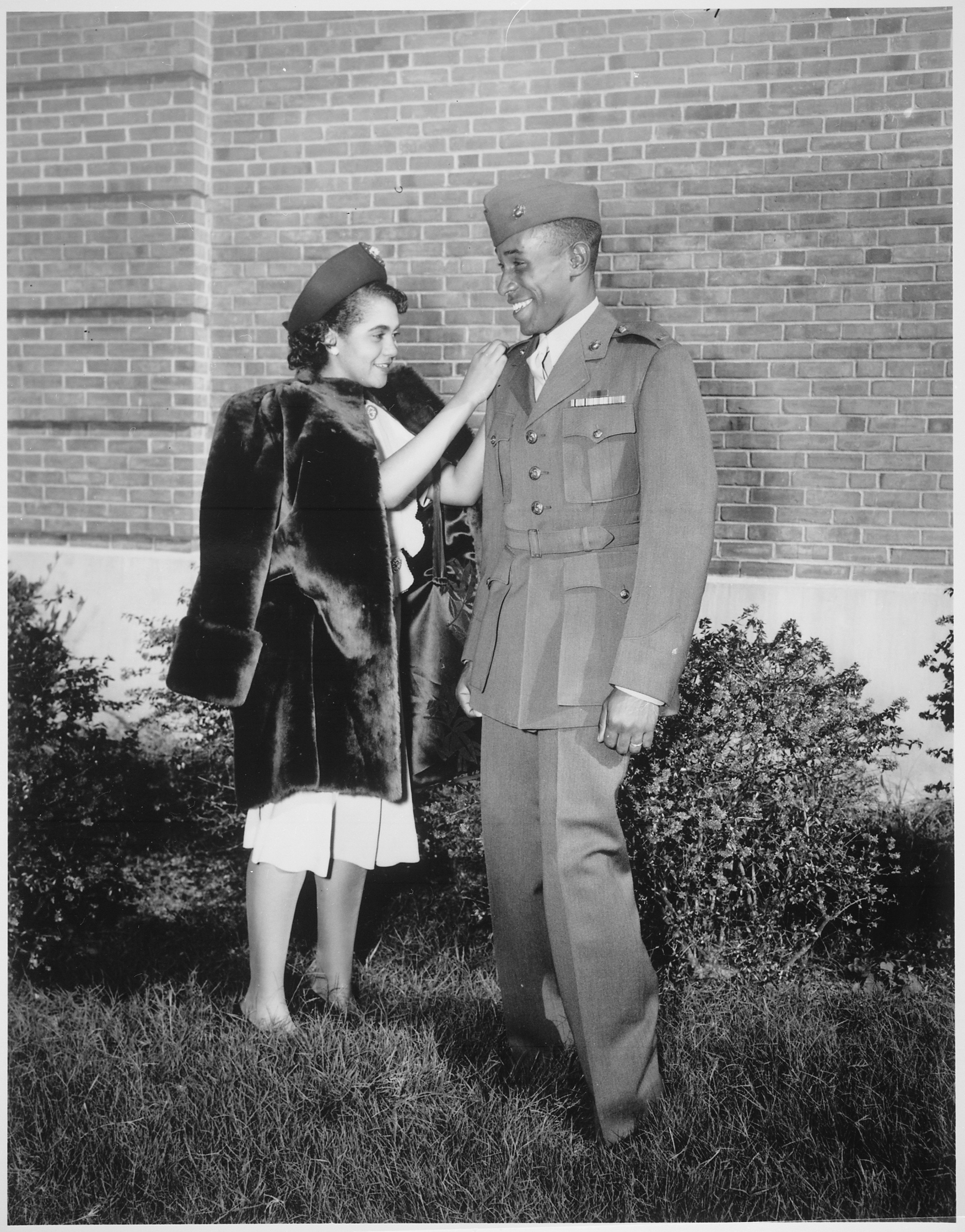
Frederick C. Branch, of North Carolina, is considered the first African-American commissioned officer in the United States Marine Corps.

When the U.S. entered World War II, the U.S. Army was racially segregated. Despite the service of African American soldiers in every previous American conflict, exclusion and discrimination from the American War Department made it difficult for black soldiers to serve. In 1939, only 3,640 black soldiers were enlisted under white leadership. Led by Rayford W. Logan, head of the Committee for the Participation of Negroes in National Defense, the push for greater black participation and nondiscrimination in the military was reflected in the Selective Service Act of 1940. Members of the NAACP also met with Roosevelt to outline demands for the betterment of black soldiers' conditions in the military.

Because of this resistance to the Army's treatment of its black soldiers, military leadership began to attempt to address the issue beginning in 1943, but segregation in the armed forces remained official policy until 1948. Roosevelt's racial quotas limited the black military population to nine percent—a proportion that the Army never even reached. Furthermore, vast majority of black soldiers were never sent overseas, due to exclusionary requests and discriminatory treatment from foreign governments.

The Army Nurse Corps was established in 1901. With the exception of 18 female African-American nurses who had served in World War I, it remained white until 1941, when pressure from the National Association of Colored Graduate Nurses, and Eleanor Roosevelt, caused the Army to admit black nurses. A quota of 48 nurses was set, and the women were segregated from white nurses and white soldiers for much of the war. Over time, more black nurses enlisted. They were assigned to care for black soldiers, and served in the China-Burma-India theater, Australia, New Guinea, Liberia, England and the Philippines.

==== Japanese Americans ====
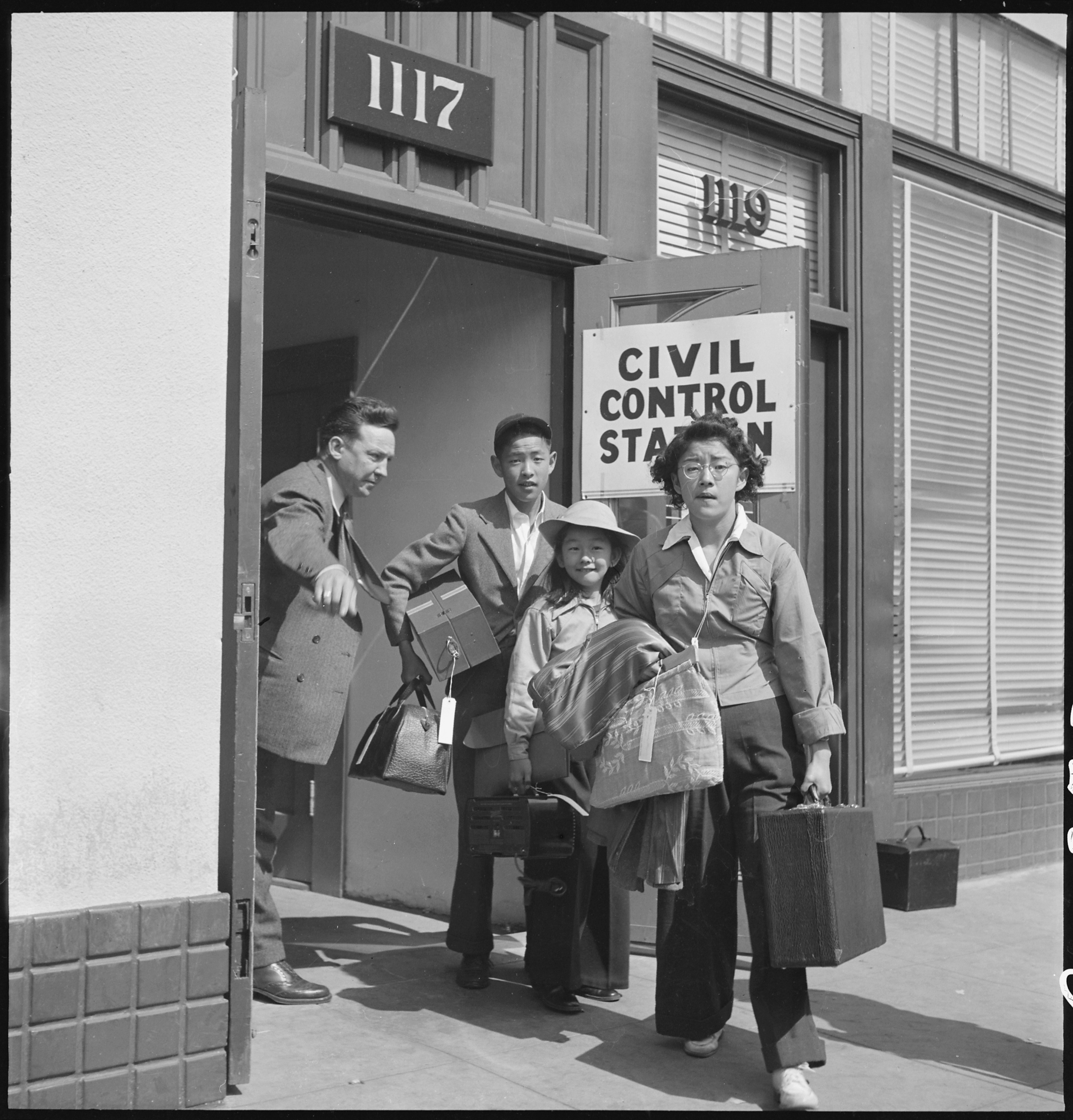
Oakland, California. Part of family unit of Japanese ancestry leave Wartime Civil Control Administer . . . - NARA - 537706

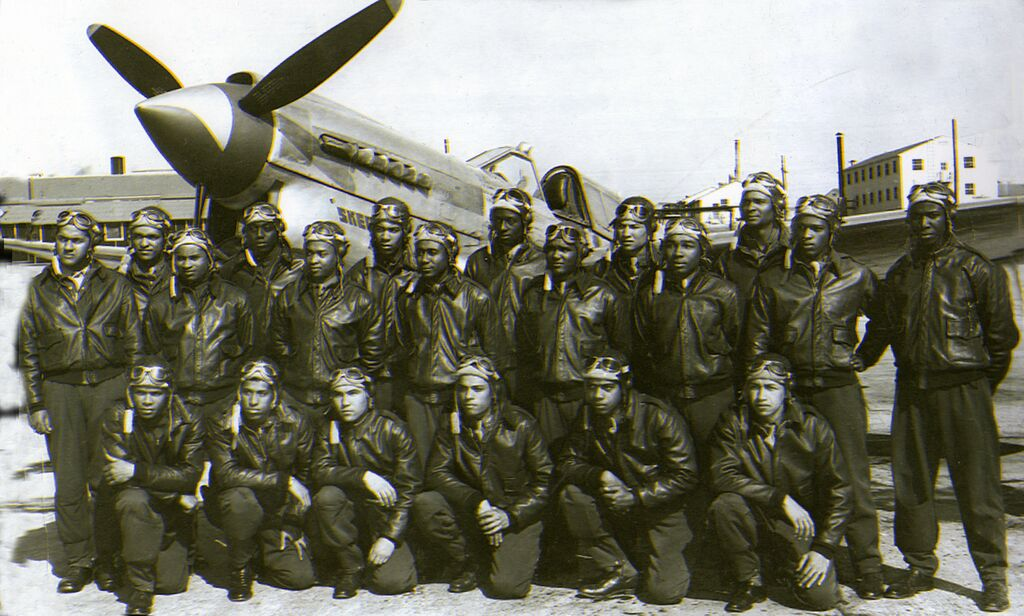
Tuskegee Squadron 001

After the Japanese attack on Pearl Harbor, men of Japanese birth and descent were classified as enemy aliens and the Army stopped accepting new Nisei recruits on January 5, 1942; however, there were 3,000 men already in the military. In Hawaii, nearly 1,500 men were sent to the continental U.S. in June 1942 to form the 100th Infantry Battalion (Separate) and trained at both Camp McCoy WI and Camp Shelby MS. Assistant Secretary of War John J. McCloy stated that one of the original purposes for the activation of the 100th Infantry Battalion (Separate) was to see if Americans of Japanese descent "were loyal and willing to fight for the country." This battalion became the War Department's test on whether they could be trustworthy soldiers when the unit landed in Italy in September 1943 as part of the 34th Infantry Division. This unit performed brilliantly, removing all doubts of the loyalty issue, that led to the eventual deployment of the 442nd Regimental Combat Team in June 1944.

In addition, on the U.S. mainland, the federal government forced most ethnic Japanese Americans and legal Japanese immigrants to relocate from Pacific coastal areas to incarceration camps located inland of the Pacific and controlled by armed guards.

After the Army stopped accepting new Nisei recruits in early 1942, because of the exemplary training record of the 100th Infantry Battalion, supporters like Hawaii military governor General Delos Emmons and War Department officials like John J. McCloy soon began to push the Roosevelt administration to allow Nisei to serve in combat. A military board was convened in June 1942 to address the issue, but their final report opposed forming a Nisei unit, citing "the universal distrust in which they [Japanese Americans] are held." Despite resistance from military and War Relocation Authority leaders, the President eventually sided with the War Department, and on February 1, 1943, Roosevelt announced the creation of the segregated the 442nd Infantry Regimental Combat Team composed of Nisei soldiers and commanded by white officers that fought in Europe. Japanese Americans were allowed to join only the Army.

The 442nd RCT formed in April 1943 of volunteers, mostly from Hawaii and some from the mainland US where many came from the internment camps, joined the 100th Infantry Battalion in Italy in June 1944. The combined units earned an extraordinary combat record in Europe, emerging as one of the most decorated units in American military history. Its motto was "Go for Broke!"

==== Chinese Americans ====
Unlike the Japanese Americans, 75% of Chinese American soldiers served in non-segregated units. An estimated 13,000 Chinese-Americans served in World War II, with two units consisting of only Chinese-Americans, the 407th Air Service Squadron, and the 987th Signal Company, based in the China Burma India Theater.

=== 1950s desegregation ===
In 1948, President Truman issued Executive Order 9981, which declared a policy of equal treatment and opportunity, but did not mention desegregation. He ordered: "It is hereby declared to be the policy of the President that there shall be equality of treatment and opportunity for all persons in the armed services without regard to race, color, religion or national origin. This policy shall be put into effect as rapidly as possible, having due regard to the time required to effectuate any necessary changes without impairing efficiency or morale." Only the Air Force used the opportunity to integrate its units. The Army was especially resistant to the order, and only cooperated when a shortage of troops in the Korean War required that black soldiers serve alongside their white counterparts. Military units were officially desegregated after the Korean War in 1954. However, racial tensions continued to give rise to segregation and in-fighting amongst various units, especially during the Vietnam War. The military inefficiencies caused by this internal conflict incentivized military leaders to seek to establish more harmonious racial relationships in the Army. One scholar argued that, in being forced to actively root out institutional racial tensions, "the military radically revised the moral contract governing relations between it and its members."

=== Vietnam War ===
During the Vietnam War, black soldiers faced two fights: one against discrimination both within the army and civilian life, and the other on the battlefield. Throughout the Vietnam War, African American soldiers were more likely to be drafted, maintained higher casualty rates, and went for the most part unsung and underrepresented in popular culture. However, despite some discrimination controversies, the Vietnam War was considered to be the first American war in which the U.S. military was fully integrated and at one point saw African Americans consist of 23% of the war's battlefield combat troops, while consisting of only 16.3% of the draft population. This growth in battlefield combat during the Vietnam War was considered to be a turnaround from the attitude in previous wars that black men were not fit for combat. According to a 2025 study, white men who were drafted to serve in the Vietnam War developed more positive attitudes towards black people.

== United States Air Force ==
When the United States Army Air Service, the precursor to the Air Force, was formed in 1918, only white soldiers were allowed.

During World War II, the Army Air Service needed more people, and recruited black men to train as pilots in the Tuskegee Airmen program. Black men and women also served in administrative and support roles. With the exception of Japanese-Americans, Asian-American men and women were recruited into integrated units of the Army Air Service during World War II.

=== Tuskegee Airmen ===
The Tuskegee Airmen were the first African American military aviators in the United States armed forces. During World War II, African Americans in southern states remained subject to the Jim Crow laws. (Note: US state and local laws enacted between 1876 and 1965 that mandated de jure racial segregation in all public activities were collectively known as the "Jim Crow laws"; the name derivation from a contemporary pejorative for African Americans.) The American military was racially segregated, as was much of the federal government. Though they faced fierce opposition from many members of Congress, The War Department, and the general public, the Tuskegee Airmen began their training in October 1940. The Tuskegee Airmen were subjected to racial discrimination, both within and outside the army. Despite these adversities, they trained and flew with distinction. All black military pilots who trained in the United States trained at Tuskegee.

It wasn't until April 1 of 1943, that the Tuskegee airmen, also known as the 99th Fighter Squadron, began preparing for departure overseas. Though their white counterparts had been sent overseas after comparably less training (some as little as five weeks), African American pilots had been given extensive instruction on radio communication, radar, combat, night flying, forced marches, and much more.

Although the 477th Bombardment Group "worked up" on North American B-25 Mitchell bombers, they never served in combat. The Tuskegee 332nd Fighter Group was the only operational unit, first sent overseas as part of Operation Torch, then seeing action in Sicily and Italy. They were deployed as bomber escorts in Europe, where they were very successful.

== United States Navy ==
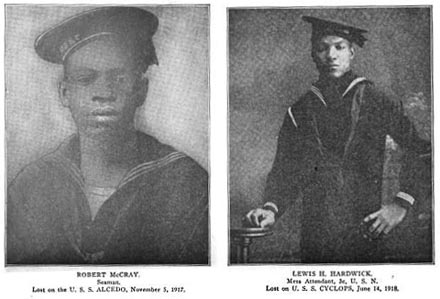
Robert McCray and Louis Hardwick, two sailors in the U.S. Navy lost at sea, 1917-18

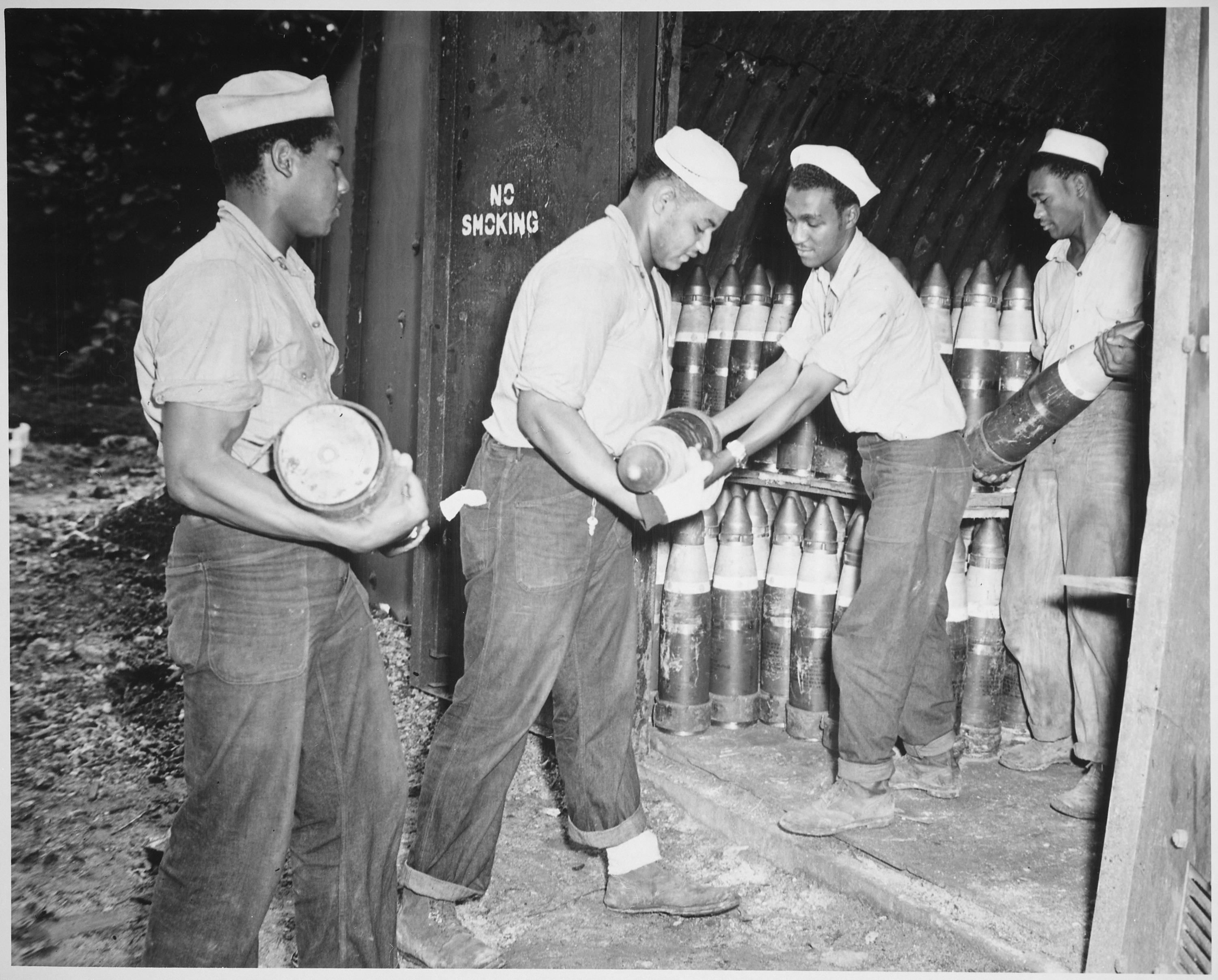
"Enlisted men serving on Espiritu Santo in the New Hebrides... placing 6-inch shells in magazines at the Naval Ammunition" - NARA - 520631

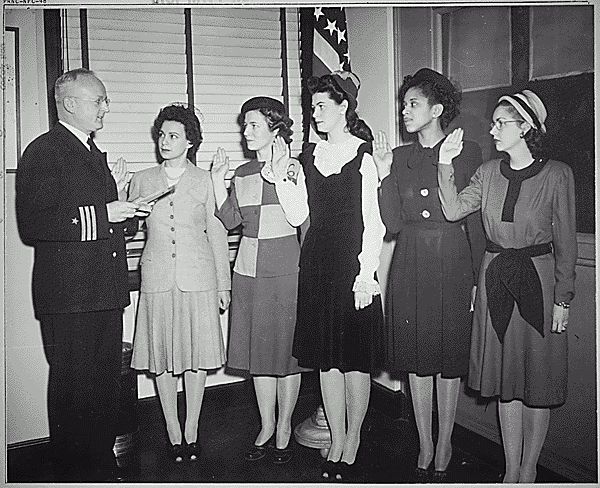
Phyllis Mae Dailey is sworn in as the first black nurse in the Navy.

=== War of 1812 ===
At the beginning of the war, official U.S. policy forbade the recruitment of black sailors. However, a shortage of manpower forced the Navy to accept any able-bodied man. Modern estimates place the number of black sailors serving in the War of 1812 at 15-20% of naval manpower. On some privateers, non-military ships which harassed enemy merchant ships, more than half of the crew was black. Life in the cramped quarters of the ships created a more egalitarian camaraderie, as well as mutual respect based on performance. However, numerous enslaved African-Americans defected to the Royal Navy after the British promised them freedom and allowed them to serve on their ships. In a letter to Commodore Perry, who had complained about being given black crew members, Commodore Isaac Chauncey wrote that he had fifty black sailors on his ship, called them "excellent seamen" and said, "I have yet to learn that the color of skin, or the cut and trimmings of the coat, can affect a man's qualifications and usefulness." Just before the Battle of Bladensburg Commodore Joshua Barney, on being asked by President James Madison "...if his negroes would not run on the approach of the British?" replied: "No Sir…they don't know how to run; they will die by their guns first." The Commodore was correct, the men did not run, one such man was young sailor Harry Jones a free black. Jones was wounded in the final action at the Battle of Bladensburg when Commodore Barney's Naval and Marine contingent were overrun. He remained a patient at the Naval Hospital Washington DC for nearly two months. African Americans like Charles Ball and Harry Jones, despite prejudice and segregation, played a significant role in the Battle of Bladensburg and contributed to the American war effort in general. Michael Shiner, a black man who worked in the Washington DC Navy yard in the early to mid 19th century, chronicled the War of 1812, as well as the racial tension of the era, in his diary.

=== 1839: number of black sailors reduced ===
From the end of the War of 1812 until the Civil War, modern scholars have had little reliable data regarding the number of black men in the naval service. The fortuitous discovery of a remarkable letter from Commodore Lewis Warrington, dated 17 September 1839, gives a better picture of the recruitment of African Americans during this period. Commodore Warrington was a vocal critic of black recruitment, writing "I deem it proper to represent to you what is a considered a great inconvenience if not an evil; and that is the number of negroes which are entered at various places for the general Service" Nonetheless, Warrington to make his case that too many blacks were already in the naval service forwarded to the Secretary of the Navy a memorandum enumerating the number of black seamen recruited over a one-year period at five naval recruiting stations. This document provides data for naval recruiting stations at New York City, Philadelphia Pa., Baltimore Md., Boston Ma., and Norfolk Va. In total for that year, 1016 men were entered for naval service, "of which 122 were Black" or 12% of the total. On 13 September 1839, acting Secretary of the Navy, Isaac Chauncey issued a circular declaring that in view of complaints, the number of blacks in the naval service would henceforth be no more than 5 percent of the total number entered under any circumstances and no slave was to be entered under any circumstances.

=== American Civil War ===
Unlike the U.S. Army, the U.S. Navy was integrated during the Civil War. During the 1840s, federal regulations limited black sailors to 5 percent of the enlisted force, but during the Civil War black participation grew to 20 per cent of the Union navy's total enlisted force, nearly double the percentage that served in the Army. Almost eighteen thousand men of African descent, and eleven women, served in the U.S. Navy during the Civil War. The ranking and status of black crew members depended on whether they had come on board as free or formerly enslaved, with the latter classified as "Boys" and given lower pay and rating.

=== World War I ===
On Navy ships, black sailors frequently worked as mess attendants, firemen, or coal passers, who hauled massive quantities of coal to fuel the ships. They were also promoted to petty officers. Navy ships continued to be integrated.

=== Interwar period ===
"The Navy's racial segregation policies limited African Americans' participation in World War I and, after the war, barred black enlistments altogether from 1919 to 1932. The only black sailors in uniform during that period were the ones aboard in 1919 who were allowed to stay to retire."

In 1932, blacks were allowed to serve on U.S. Navy ships as stewards and mess attendants.

=== World War II ===
==== African Americans ====
In June 1940, the U.S. Navy had 4,007 African American personnel, representing 2.3 percent of its total strength of nearly 170,000. All of these African Americans were enlisted men, and with the exception of six regular-rated seamen, all were steward's mates. They were characterized by the black press as "seagoing bellhops." Within a month after the attack on Pearl Harbor, the number of African Americans in the Navy had increased to 5,026; however, they were still restricted to working as steward's mates. One exception was the black navy bandmaster Alton Augustus Adams, who was recalled to active duty after Pearl Harbor along with eight other black musicians and sent to Guantanamo Bay, creating the Navy's first racially integrated ensemble. Another was the first black radarman in the U.S. Navy, Augustus Prince, who served aboard the USS Santee (CVE-29) and who later became a nuclear scientist at Brookhaven National Laboratory.

The destroyer-escort USS Mason was the only Navy vessel in World War II with an entirely black crew who were not cooks or waiters. In 1995, 11 surviving crew members were all given belated recognition and letters of commendation from Navy Secretary John Dalton for having braved harsh weather and quickly welding the cracks in their ship so they could continue escorting support ships to England.

The Navy did not allow women of color until January 25, 1945. The first African-American woman sworn into the Navy was Phyllis Mae Dailey, a nurse and Columbia University student from New York. She was the first of only four African American women to serve in the Navy during World War II.

Publicity surrounding the Port Chicago disaster on July 17, 1944, and the ensuing mutiny convictions of 50 black sailors spotlighted racism in the Navy and was a major impetus for Circular Order 48-46, published on February 27, 1946, which desegregated the Navy.

African American Seabees

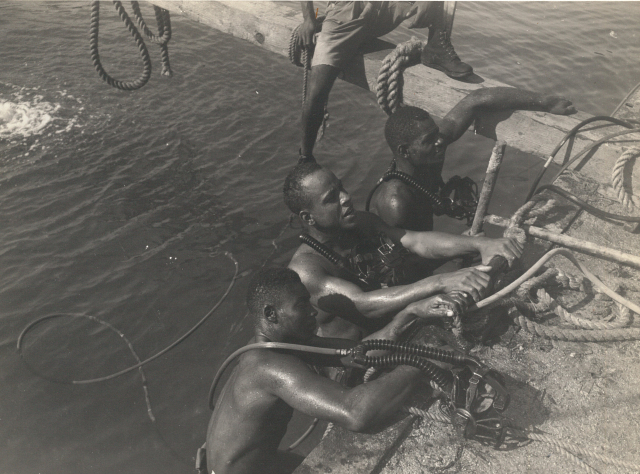
Construction divers from the 34th CB at Gavutu, Solomon Islands, Nov. 8, 1943 installing a marine railway.

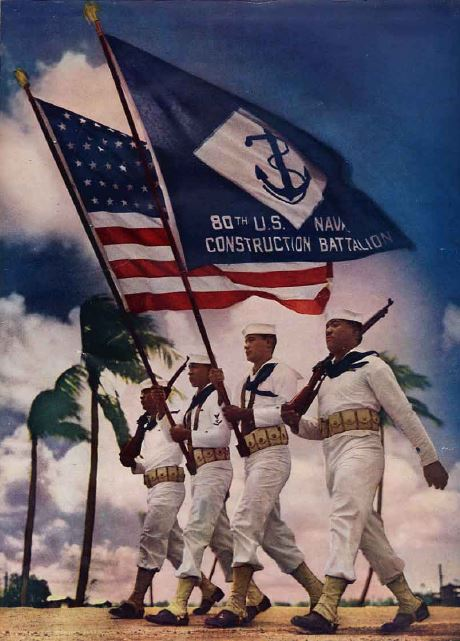
80th Naval Construction Battalion color guard. The 80th CB was the second of two African American battalions in the Naval Construction Force known as the Seabees

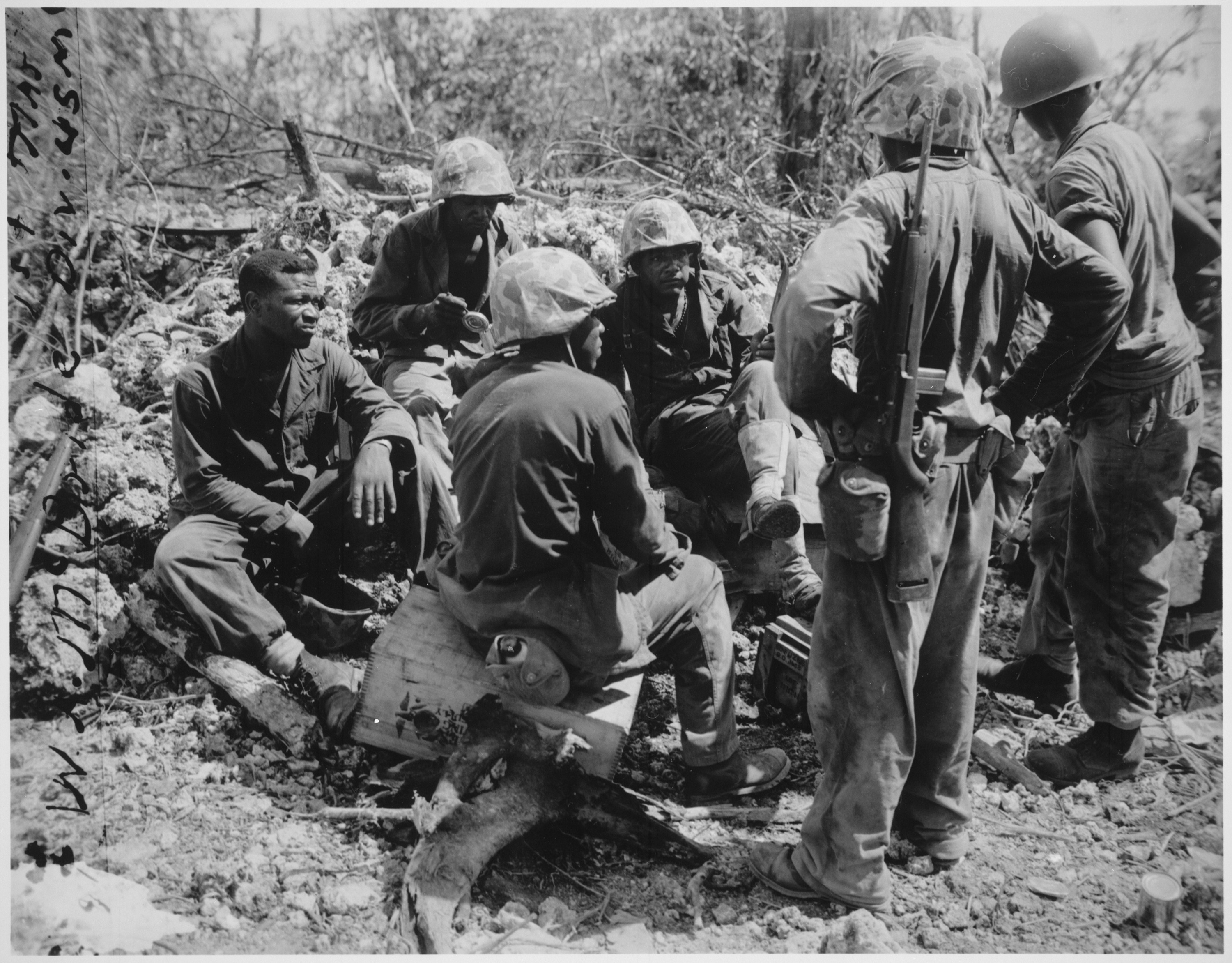
"17th Special" Seabees with the 7th Marines on Peleliu made national news in an official U.S. Navy press release. NARA-532537

In February 1942 CNO Admiral Harold Rainsford Stark recommended African Americans for ratings in the construction trades. In April the Navy announced it would enlist African Americans in the first segregated construction battalions (or "CBs"). There were only two regular CBs (better known as "Seabees") that were entirely segregated units: the 34th and 80th NCBs. Both units enlisted white Southern officers and black sailors. Both battalions experienced problems with this arrangement which led to the replacement of the officers.

The Navy had a huge need for cargo handlers. The lack of stevedores for unloading ships in combat zones was creating a problem. On 18 September 1942 authorization was granted for the formation of a different type of CB denoted by the tag "Special" for cargo handling. The Navy created 17 Special and two regular CBs, all of which had white officers. Over 14,000 African American military personnel were enlisted in these units over the course of World War II. By the end of the war, 41 Special Construction Battalions were commissioned, 15 of which remained segregated. The Special CBs later became the first fully integrated units in the U.S. Navy. The war's end brought the decommissioning of every one of these units.

The Seabees carried out important infrastructural work overseas on behalf of the Navy. This included the construction of roads, housing, storage units, airfields, and bridges. They also fought alongside Army troops. Of particular note were the actions of the 17th Special at Peleliu 15–18 September 1944. On D-day, the 7th Marines found themselves outnumbered and unable to get their wounded to safety. 2 segregated companies of the 16 Marine Field Depot and 17th Special Seabee came to their aid. The Japanese mounted a counter-attack at 0200 hours on D-day night. By the time it was over nearly the entire 17th had volunteered to hump ammunition to the front lines on the stretchers they had used to save the wounded. They also volunteered to supplement the lack of troops to man the lines. The 17th remained with the 7th Marines until the right flank had been secured. Half of the 200 African American Seabees which aided in this battle became casualties during the first week of combat. According to the Military History Encyclopedia on the Web, were it not for the "Black Marine shore party personnel" the counterattack on the 7th Marines would not have been repulsed.

- African American Seabees

==== Asian Americans ====
Prior to World War II, the U.S. Navy had recruited Chinese Americans but they had been restricted to serve only as stewards; This continued until May 1942, when restrictions ceased and they were allowed to serve in other ratings. The Korean-American Susan Ahn Cuddy was the first Asian-American woman to join the Navy in 1942 and the first female to operate flexible-mount or turret-mounted machine guns on an aircraft in the Navy. The Navy refused to accept Japanese-American recruits throughout World War II.

== United States Marine Corps ==
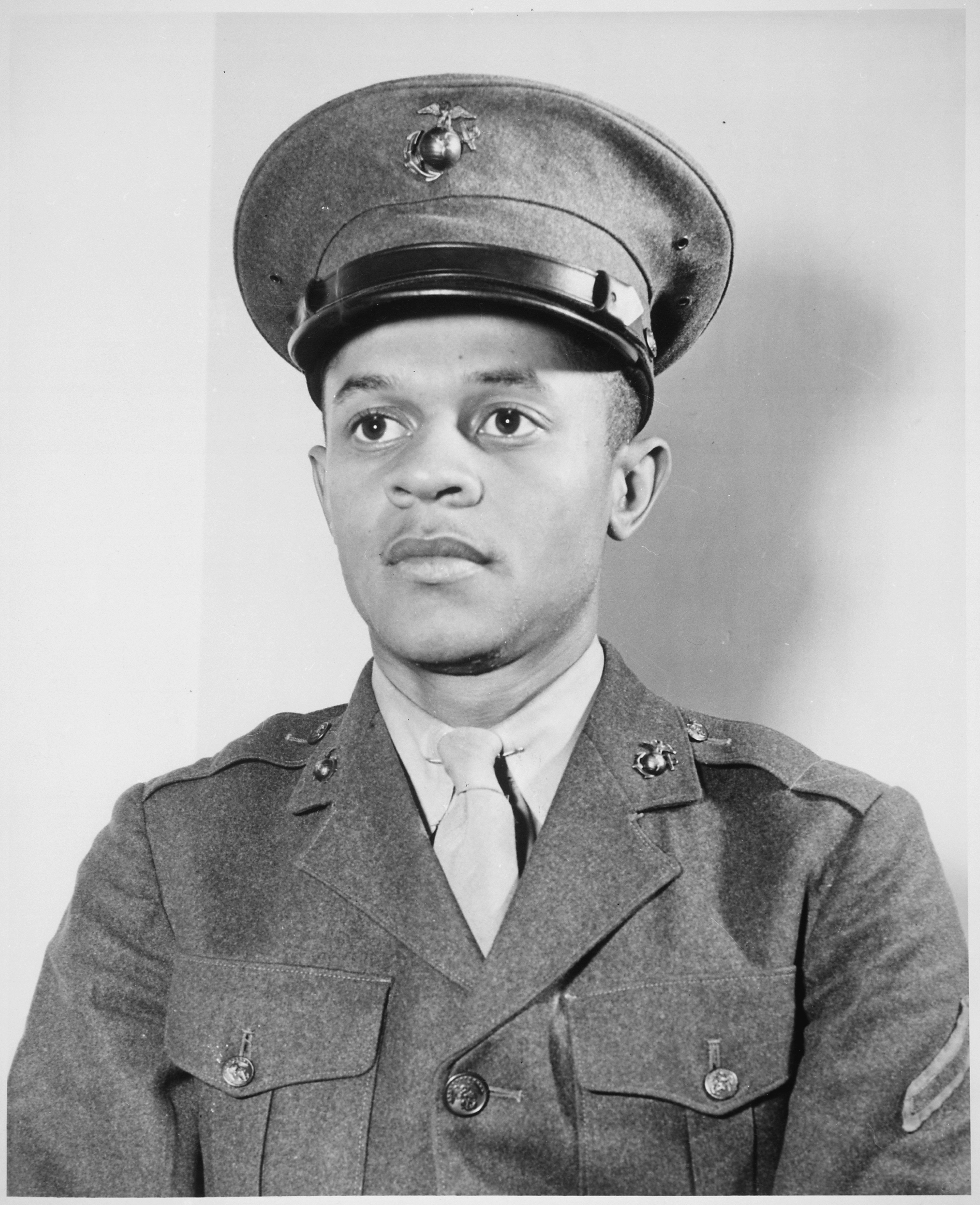
Howard P. Perry, the first African-American US Marine Corps recruit to arrive at Montford Point training camp. He enlisted in July 1942.

In 1776 and 1777, a dozen African American Marines served in the American Revolutionary War, but from 1798 to 1942, the USMC followed a racially discriminatory policy of denying African Americans the opportunity to serve as Marines. For 144 years, the Marines recruited primarily European Americans and Hispanic Americans, along with a few Asian Americans.

The USMC opened its doors to African Americans in June 1942, with the acceptance of African Americans as recruits in segregated all-black units. Other races were accepted somewhat more easily, joining white Marine units. For the next few decades, the incorporation of black troops was not widely accepted within the Corps, nor was desegregation smoothly or quickly achieved.

Spurred by executive orders in 1941 and 1948, the integration of non-white USMC personnel proceeded in stages from segregated battalions in 1942, to unified training in 1949, and finally full integration in 1960.

By 2006, approximately 20% of the USMC was Black American and 15–18% Hispanic; slightly more than the 30 to 31% of the U.S. ratio of minorities in the general population.

=== Background ===
The first African American to fight in a Marine role was John Martin, also known as Keto, the slave of a Delaware man, recruited in April 1776 without his owner's permission by Captain of the Marines Miles Pennington of the Continental brig USS Reprisal. Martin served with the Marine platoon on the Reprisal for a year and a half, involved in hard ship-to-ship fighting, but was lost with the rest of his unit when the brig sank in October 1777.

At least 12 other black men served with various American Marine units in 1776–1777; more may have been in service but not identified as blacks in the records. However, in 1798 when the Marine Corps was officially re-instituted, Secretary of War James McHenry specified in its rules: "No Negro, Mulatto or Indian to be enlisted". Marine Commandant William Ward Burrows instructed his recruiters regarding USMC racial policy, "You can make use of Blacks and Mulattoes while you recruit, but you cannot enlist them." This policy was designed to set a higher standard of unit cohesion for Marines so that they would remain loyal, maintain shipboard discipline and help put down mutinies, as it was believed a multiracial crew would cause disputes and thus lower unit cohesion.

The Marine Corps, being a combat arm of the Navy, did not recruit any black soldiers: instead, the USMC was serviced by US Navy supply personnel including black laborers. Unlike the United States Army which had separate regiments that a soldier could remain in for his entire military career, Marines were individually transferred to various ship's detachments and naval bases. After World War I, the number of blacks in both the Navy and the Army was reduced to about 1.5% of the total number of active servicemen, a proportion much lower than the number of blacks in the general population.

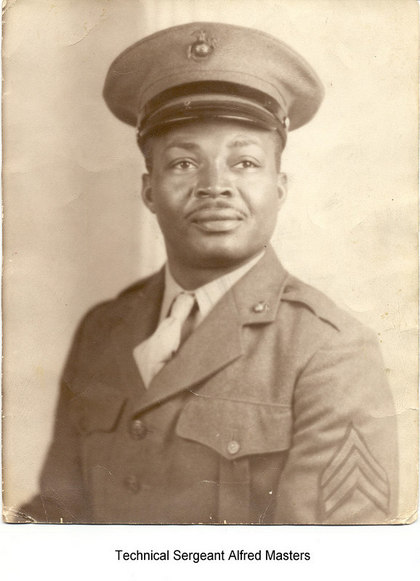
Alfred Masters is the first African-American to enlist in the US Marine Corps since the Revolutionary War and after Executive Order 8802. Masters enlisted June 1, 1942, arrived at Montford Point Nov 17, 1942, and rose to the rank of Technical Sergeant.

=== Franklin Roosevelt administration ===
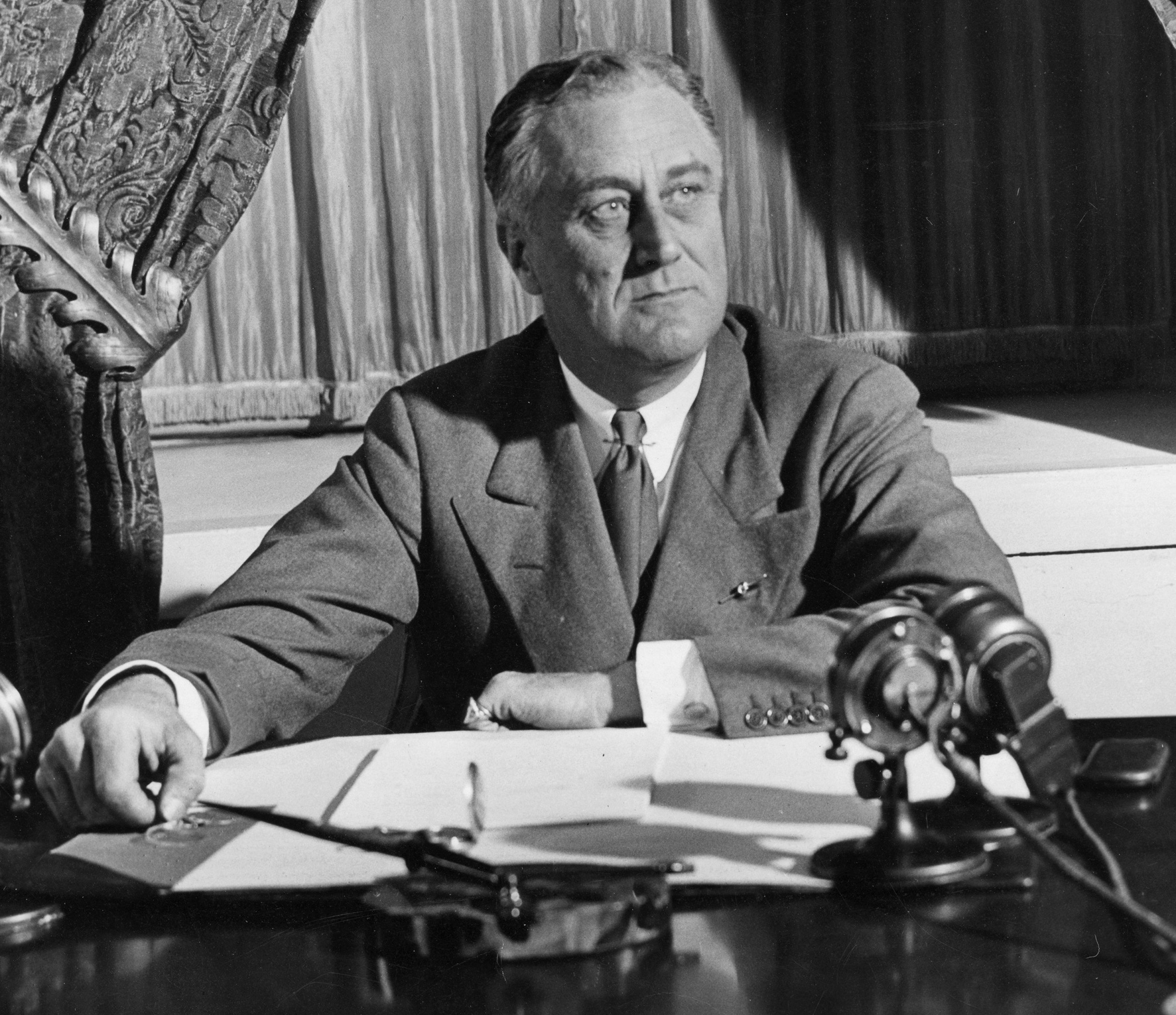
President Franklin Delano Roosevelt prohibited racial discrimination in the military.

During the administration of Franklin Delano Roosevelt, the growing political power of African Americans was increasingly felt in Washington, DC. Civil rights groups such as the National Association for the Advancement of Colored People (NAACP), the National Urban League, and the National Negro Congress called for greater equality between the races. In 1938, the Committee on Participation of Negroes in the National Defense Program was formed by the Pittsburgh Courier, a newspaper with a large black readership. Further calls to increase the proportion of blacks in the military were published in 1939.

After wars broke out in the late 1930s in Africa, China and Europe, black community leaders determined to use the black workforce's loyalty as leverage to gain greater racial equality at home. In June 1940, the NAACP's magazine, The Crisis, published a declaration that the fighting around the world was certainly bad, "but the hysterical cries of the preachers of democracy for Europe leave us cold. We want democracy in Alabama, Arkansas, in Mississippi and Michigan, in the District of Columbia, in the Senate of the United States." During the 1940 presidential election, both parties courted the black vote. Incumbent President Franklin Delano Roosevelt was re-elected, partly because substantial numbers of black voters crossed previous party lines and voted for the Democratic Party candidate.

In April 1941, the U.S. Navy convened its General Board to discuss expansion of the USMC. Major General Thomas Holcomb, Commandant of the Marines said that African Americans had no right to serve as Marines. He said, "If it were a question of having a Marine Corps of 5,000 whites or 250,000 Negroes, I would rather have the whites."

In 1941, civil rights activists Bayard Rustin, A. Philip Randolph, and A. J. Muste pushed Roosevelt to order fair employment for blacks in the federal government. Many rural southern African-Americans who had arrived in urban Northern and Western states in search of defense industry jobs during the second phase of the Great Migration were faced with constant discrimination in housing, on the job market, and in their recreational activities.

After the activists threatened to march on Washington D.C. in July 1941, Roosevelt - faced with a public relations disaster for his presidency and wanting to unite all Americans in striving towards defeating fascism - issued Executive Order 8802 on June 25, 1941, which ordered the elimination of racial discrimination from federal departments, agencies, the military, and private defense contractors, after which the planned march was cancelled.

Directed by Roosevelt and U.S. Navy Secretary Frank Knox to accept black recruits, Holcomb proposed a separate battalion of African Americans, a seacoast defense battalion armed with anti-aircraft and anti-shipping artillery. To make this battalion self-supporting, Holcomb determined that it would contain a rifle company, special weapons platoons, and a light tank platoon—all manned by black Marines.

=== World War II ===
In early 1942, Philip Johnston, a U.S. Army veteran of World War I, suggested to the USMC that they follow the example of the Army and recruit native speakers of the Navajo language to pass important tactical messages by radio, to serve as code talkers on the battlefield. On May 5, 1942, the first group of 29 Navajo recruits was accepted at Marine Corps Recruit Depot San Diego. From 1942 to 1945, some 375 to 420 Navajo trained as code talkers, part of about 540 Marines who were native Navajo speakers during World War II. All of these soldiers served in desegregated units alongside Marines of various races. A total of 874 Native Americans of various tribes served in the USMC in World War II.

The USMC did not form battalions of Asian Americans. Rather, it integrated Asian American recruits with European American soldiers. The first Chinese American USMC officer, Wilbur Carl Sze, was commissioned as a second lieutenant in December 1943. In contemporary times, proportionately fewer Asian Americans join the U.S. military than appear in the U.S. general population.

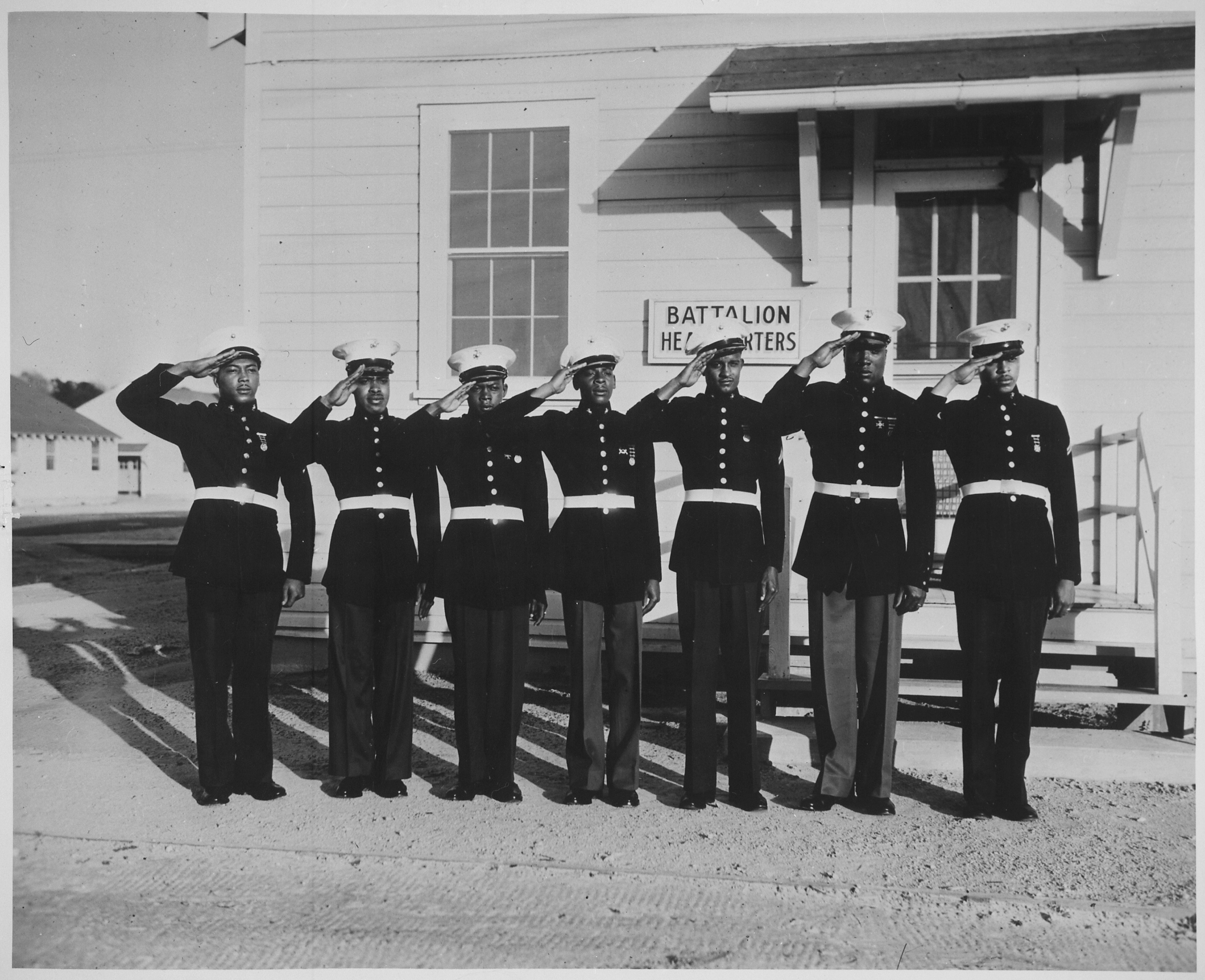
Marines at Montford Point show their dress uniforms.

On June 1, 1942, the initial group of black USMC recruits was admitted, but they were not immediately trained because separate, segregated facilities had not yet been completed. The first Black enlisted Marine was Alfred Masters from Oklahoma City who enlisted June 1, 1942 at 12:01 midnight. Black volunteers began their basic training in August at Montford Point in North Carolina, a satellite base to Marine Barracks, New River, later called Marine Corps Base Camp Lejeune. The first black recruit to arrive in camp was Howard P. Perry on August 26, followed that day by 12 others. Perry enlisted in July. These and subsequent recruits were organized into the 51st Defense Battalion, a static artillery unit intended to hold land against attack.

By October 29, only 647 of a planned 1,200 recruits had passed entrance examinations: to avoid forming segregated training units to teach typing, truck driving and other specialist skills necessary to run the battalion, Holcomb required more than half of the recruits to demonstrate proficiency in these skills prior to acceptance. This requirement was dropped in view of the delay it caused in bringing the battalion up to strength. Recruits were taught specialist skills by white USMC instructors brought into Montford Point, or they were sent to nearby Army classes.

The black recruits were not allowed in Camp Lejeune unless accompanied by a white Marine, and their service papers were stamped "Colored". Although the U.S. was by this time fully engaged in war, the recruits were assigned to inactive duty in the Marine Corps Reserve. Their units were segregated, as all the enlisted servicemen were black, with white officers and drill instructors. The commander of the black Marines at Montford Point was Samuel A. Woods Jr who worked to enforce segregation, protecting his troops from being detained by local authorities while they were visiting town. By early 1943, the white drill instructors were leaving for war and were being replaced by black sergeants and corporals.

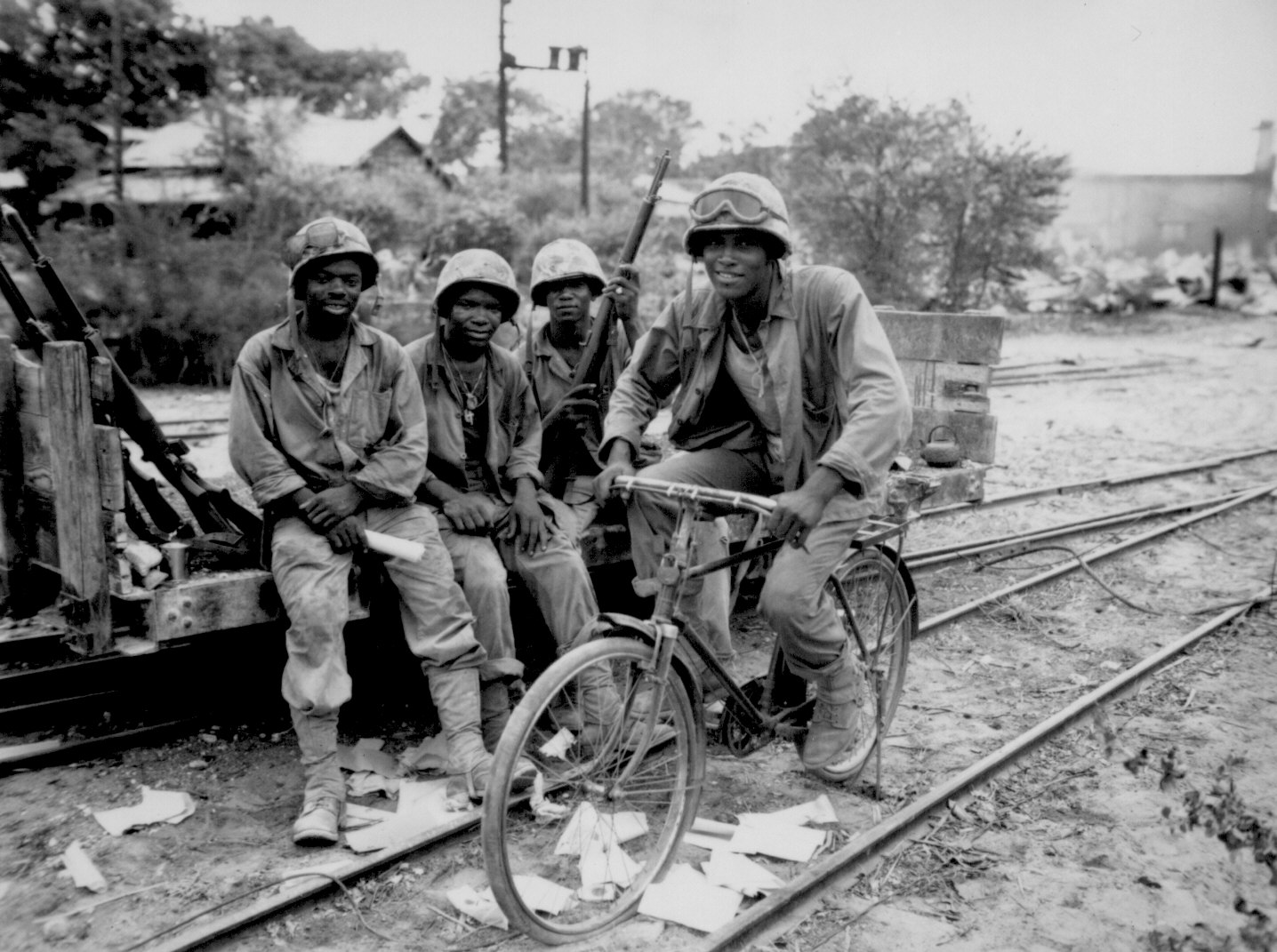
Members of the 3d Ammunition Company, part of the 2nd Marine Division, relax with a captured bicycle after the Battle of Saipan

After accepting more black recruits, the USMC formed the 52nd Defense Battalion. Both the 51st and 52nd shipped out to fight in the Pacific War, but as defense units holding land far behind the front lines they did not see much action. In total, 19,168 African Americans joined the Marines, about 4% of the USMC's strength; some 75% of them performed their duties overseas. About 8,000 black USMC stevedores and ammunition handlers served under enemy fire during offensive operations in the Pacific. Following the June 1944 Battle of Saipan, USMC General Alexander Vandegrift said of the steadfast performance of the all-black 3d Marine Ammunition Company: "The Negro Marines are no longer on trial. They are Marines, period."

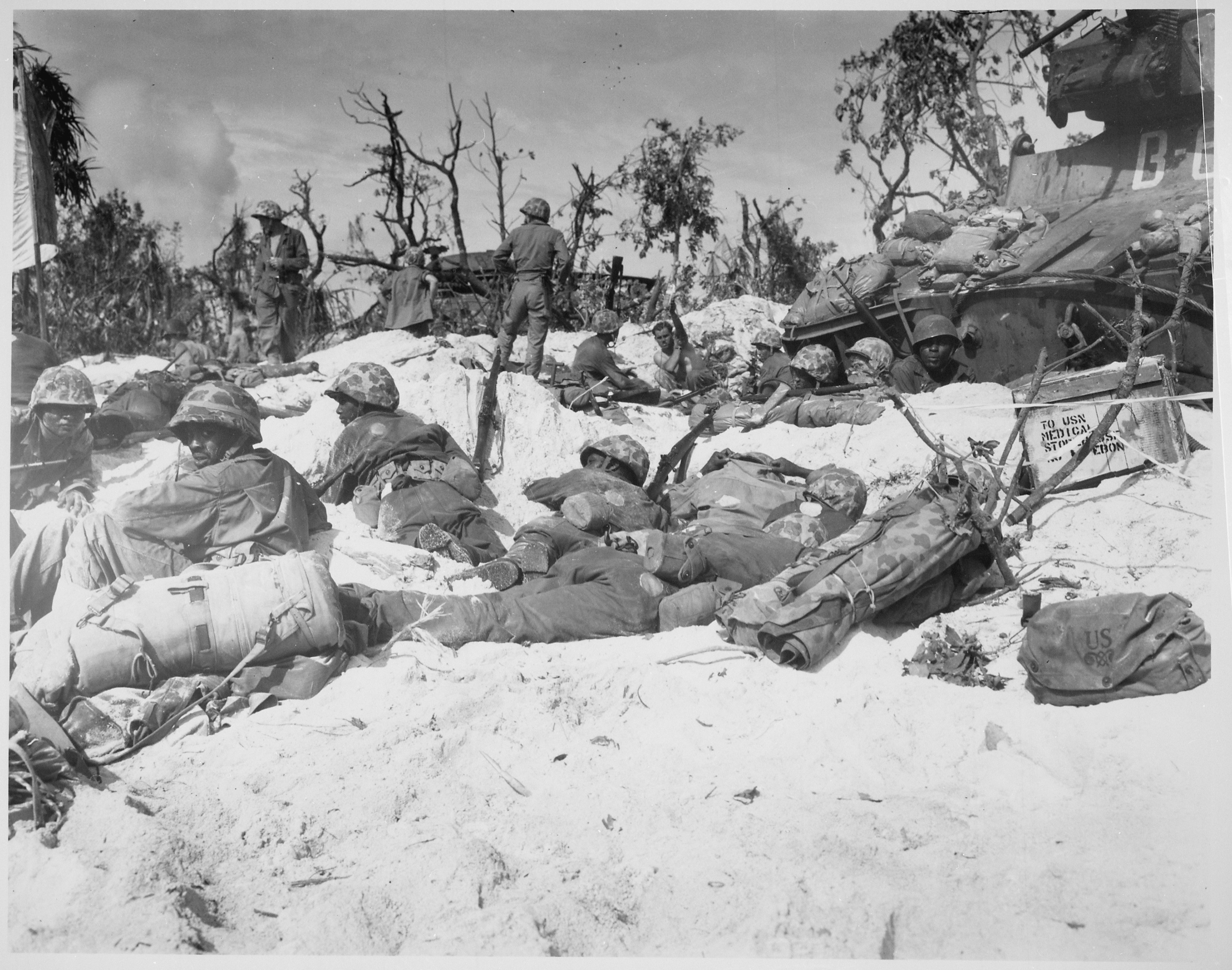
D-day Peleliu, African Americans of one of the two segregated units that supported the 7th Marines - the 16th Marine Field Depot or the 17th Naval Construction Battalion Special take a break in the 115 degree heat., 09-15-1944 - NARA - 532535

A testament to this came at Peleliu 15–18 September 1944. On D-day the 7th Marines were in a situation where they did not have enough men to man the lines and get the wounded to safety. Coming to their aid were the 2 companies of the 16 Marine Field Depot(segregated) and the 17th Special Seabee(segregated). That night the Japanese mounted a counter-attack at 0200 hours. The Field Depot Marines are recorded as again having humped ammunition, to the front lines on the stretchers they brought the wounded back on and picked up rifles to become infantrymen. By the time it was over nearly the entire 17th CB had volunteered alongside them. According to the Military History Encyclopedia on the Web, were it not for the "Black Marine shore party personnel" the counterattack on the 7th Marines would not have been repulsed.

- On Peleliu, shore party detachments from the 33rd and 73rd CBs received Presidential Unit Citations along with the primary shore party, 1st Marine Pioneers. The three Commanders of the 7th Marine Ammo Co., the 11th Marine Depot Co. and the 17th Special CB all received the same commendatory letter. Before the battle was even over, Major General Rupertus USMC wrote to each that: "THE NEGRO RACE CAN WELL BE PROUD OF THE WORK PERFORMED [by the 11th Marine Depot Company/ 7th Marine Ammunition Company/ 17th CB]. THE WHOLEHEARTED CO-OPERATION AND UNTIRING EFFORTS WHICH DEMONSTRATED IN EVERY RESPECT THAT THEY APPRECIATED THE PRIVILEGE OF WEARING A MARINE UNIFORM AND SERVING WITH THE MARINES IN COMBAT. PLEASE CONVEY TO YOUR COMMAND THESE SENTIMENTS AND INFORM THEM THAT IN THE EYES OF THE ENTIRE DIVISION THEY HAVE EARNED A "WELL DONE"." The U.S.Navy made an official press release November 28, 1944 of the 17th CB's copy of the "Well Done" letter from the Marine Corps.

=== 1946 to 1960 ===
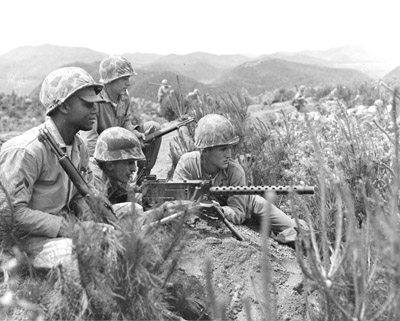
U.S. soldiers in the Korean War

After World War II, the USMC reduced in size; the number of African-American Marines dropped to 2,000 men, which was one-tenth of wartime levels. In 1947, the Marine Corps forced African-American men to choose between leaving the service or becoming a steward (a food service position). A few non-white Marines advanced in grade, such as Kurt Chew-Een Lee, a Chinese-American soldier who was commissioned a second lieutenant in 1946. Lee earned the Navy Cross under fire in Korea in September 1950, serving in the 1st Battalion 7th Marines; at the time this was a primarily Euro-American unit.

On July 26, 1948, President Harry S. Truman issued Executive Order 9981 establishing equality of treatment and opportunity in the U.S. military regardless of race. He appointed the President's Committee on Equality of Treatment and Opportunity in the Armed Services, two of whose five members were African American. In January 1949, the Fahy Committee (nicknamed after its chairman) met to hear concerns by armed forces' leaders about the new executive order, and both the Army and the Marine Corps leadership defended their practices of segregation. The Navy and the newly formed United States Air Force announced their intentions to follow the order. The USMC said that it had only one black officer among 8,200 white ones.

In late 1949, all-black USMC units persisted, but the Marines had black and white recruits beginning to train together. The few black USMC officers were assigned exclusively to black units; they were not asked to lead white Marines into combat. In 1952, after two years of the Korean War, the Marines cautiously integrated blacks into combat units. In the late 1950s, black Marines were not rewarded with preferred or high-visibility assignments, such as embassy guard duty and guard duty in the nation's capital. By 1960, full integration of the races had been completed by the USMC, but racial tensions flared up through the next decade, a period of civil rights activism in the larger society.

== See also ==
- Ethnic minorities in the US armed forces during World War II
- Hispanic Americans in World War II
- Military history of African Americans
- Military history of Asian Americans
- Racism against African Americans in the U.S. military
