= LBJ (1991 film) =

1991 television documentary film

- Genre: Documentary
- Written by: David Grubin
- Directed by: David Grubin
- Narrated by: David McCullough
- Music by: Michael Bacon
- Country of origin: United States
- Original language: English

Production
- Producers: Chana Gazit (senior); David Grubin
- Cinematography: William B. Mccullough
- Editors: Geof Bartz; Tom Haneke
- Running time: 240 minutes
- Production companies: KERA; David Grubin Productions

Original release
- Network: PBS
- Release: September 30, 1991

LBJ is a 1991 two-part (four episode) television documentary film about Lyndon B. Johnson, the 36th president of the United States. Produced by PBS for The American Experience (now American Experience) documentary program, it recounts Johnson's life from his childhood to his presidency up to his death. Written, co-produced and directed by David Grubin and narrated by David McCullough, the film first aired on PBS in two parts on September 30 and October 1, 1991. Part 1, Episode 1: Beautiful Texas; Episode 2: My Fellow Americans; Part 2, Episode 3: We Shall Overcome; Episode 4: The Last Believer.

== Interviewees ==
- Robert Baker, Senate aide
- George Ball, Undersecretary of State
- Larry Berman, Vietnam historian
- William P. Bundy, Assistant Secretary of State
- S. Douglas Cater, Washington, D.C. reporter
- Clark Clifford, presidential adviser
- John Connally, campaign aide; advisor
- Ava Cox, cousin
- Robert Dallek, biographer
- Homer Dean, campaign supporter
- Rebecca Doggert, Newark Head Start
- Ronnie Dugger, biographer
- Daniel Ellsberg, Defense Department staff
- James Farmer, civil rights activist
- J. William Fulbright, Senate Foreign Relations Committee
- Doris Kearns Goodwin, biographer
- Richard Goodwin, presidential speechwriter
- Lewis Gould, historian
- Nicholas Katzenbach, Attorney General
- Eliot Janeway, economist; family friend
- Lady Bird Johnson, First Lady
- Donald Malafronte, aide to Mayor of Newark
- Harry McPherson, Senate staff
- Rep. James Pickle, campaign worker
- George Reedy, White House press secretary
- Dean Rusk, Secretary of State
- Howard Schuman, Senate aide
- Sergeant Shriver, Peace Corps director
- E. Babe Smith, Pedernales Electric Co-op
- James Thomson Jr., National Security Council staff
- Jack Valenti, special assistant to the president
- Elizabeth Wickenden, family friend
- Roger Wilkins, Johnson administration attorney
- Lee Williams, aide to Senator Fulbright
- Andrew Young, civil rights activist

== Critical response ==
Walter Goodman of The New York Times gave LBJ a positive review, stating that "Mr. Grubin demonstrates the mastery of the television documentary that makes his work an absorbing start to a new season of 'The American Experience.' [...] It is a powerful story, powerfully rendered."

== Home media ==
LBJ was first released by PBS on VHS in two separate editions for both of its two parts, and was later given a single VHS release on September 23, 1997. PBS released the film on DVD without extras on February 14, 2006, and later included it in an American Experience DVD box set collecting its films about United States presidents on August 26, 2008.
