= Richard Kluger =

American author (born 1934)

Richard Kluger (born 1934) is an American author who has won a Pulitzer Prize. He focuses his writing chiefly on society, politics and history. He has been a journalist and book publisher.

== Early life and family ==
Born in Paterson, New Jersey, in September 1934. Kluger grew up living with his mother, Ida, and older brother, Alan, on the Upper West Side of New York after his parents were divorced when he was seven. Though neither of his parents completed high school, they made sure their two sons had the advantage of a good education. Kluger enrolled in the Columbia School of Journalism but did not graduate. He attended the Horace Mann School in the Riverdale section of the Bronx and Princeton University, attaining honors as an English major, but his principal pursuit at college was the school newspaper where he was the 1955–56 chair of the Daily Princetonian.

Kluger has been greatly assisted in his nonfiction work by the research skills of his wife, the former Phyllis Schlain, whom he married in South Orange, New Jersey, in March 1957. She attended Douglass College and later graduated from Columbia University, where she majored in art history. Her academic background and a remarkable gift for the fiber arts stood her in good stead when she authored two books of her own, A Needlepoint Gallery of Patterns from the Past (Knopf) and Victorian Designs for Needlepoint (Holt, Rinehart & Winston). Phyllis is also the creator of satiric and documentary quilts with titles like "Cereal Killer Strikes Again" and "The Real George Washington, Warts and All" and dealing with, among other subjects, the rise and fall of the British empire, American homes, and the fall of Soviet communism. Her six-foot-square quilt "The Princeton-Yale Game Increases in Intensity" is on permanent display at Princeton University's Frist Student Center.

The Klugers have two sons, Matthew Kluger, a disbarred attorney, and Ted, a builder-contractor, and six grandsons.

== Writing career ==
Kluger began his career as a journalist, writing for various small newspapers. He later wrote for the Wall Street Journal, the New York Post, and the New York Herald Tribune (he was its last literary editor), and magazines, including Forbes. Kluger left journalism to serve as executive editor at Simon & Schuster and editor-in-chief at Atheneum. Afterward, he set up his own publishing house, Charterhouse Books, in partnership with David McKay. McKay acquired Charterhouse in 1973 when Kluger left publishing to become a full-time writer. Kluger has written books of fiction and social history. He is the author of six novels (and two others with his wife, Phyllis). Two of his books were National Book Award finalists, Simple Justice and The Paper (a history of the Herald Tribune). His historical study of the American cigarette business, Ashes to Ashes: America's Hundred-Year Cigarette War, the Public Health, and the Unabashed Triumph of Philip Morris, won the Pulitzer Prize in 1997.

In 2011, Kluger published The Bitter Waters of Medicine Creek: A Tragic Clash Between White and Native America.

In 2006, Kluger published Seizing Destiny: How America Grew from Sea to Shining Sea, an extended investigation of how the current territory of the United States was amassed. The book received mixed reviews, alternately complimenting its detailed insights into the under-reported history of this issue, and criticizing the author's alleged biases, errors, inferences and presumptions, and allegedly verbose writing style.

== Politics ==
Kluger's writing has been described as liberal, and/or emphasizing racial-injustice perspectives.

In 1968, he signed the "Writers and Editors War Tax Protest" pledge, vowing to refuse tax payments in protest against the Vietnam War.

== Bibliography ==
=== Non-fiction ===
- Simple Justice: A History of Brown v. Board of Education & Black America's Struggle for Equality (1976)
- The Paper: The Life and Death of the New York Herald Tribune (1986)
- Ashes to Ashes: America's Hundred-Year Cigarette War, the Public Health, and the Unabashed Triumph of Philip Morris (1996), 1997 Pulitzer Prize Winner in General Nonfiction
- Seizing Destiny: How America Grew from Sea to Shining Sea (2007)
- The Bitter Waters of Medicine Creek: A Tragic Clash Between White and Native America (2011)
- Indelible Ink: The Trials of John Peter Zenger and the Birth of America's Free Press (2016)

=== Fiction ===
- When the Bough Breaks (1964)
- National Anthem (1969)
- Members of the Tribe (1978)
- Star Witness (1979)
- Un-American Activities (1982)
- The Sheriff of Nottingham (1992), co-authored with Phyllis Kluger
- Good Goods (1982)
- Royal Poinciana (1987) (under pseudonym Thea Coy Douglass)
- Beethoven's Tenth (2018)
- Hamlet's Children (2023)

== Sources ==
- Richard Kluger: Biographical Sketch - The writings of Richard Kluger
- Author Spotlight: Richard Kluger at Random House
