= Michael Lawrence (filmmaker) =

American filmmaker

Michael R. Lawrence is an American filmmaker and screenwriter living in Baltimore, Maryland. He has produced documentary films for PBS, HBO, CNN, and the Library of Congress, as well as making independent films.

== Life ==
While still a teenager, Michael Lawrence performed widely on the guitar and five-string banjo in the Midwest and on the East Coast, both as a folk instrumentalist and vocalist. This included a summer as banjoist with The Stephen Foster Story in Bardstown, Kentucky. Lawrence studied classical guitar with Aaron Shearer, composition with Stephan Grové, and jazz with David Baker. A graduate of the first guitar class at The Peabody Conservatory of Music (The Peabody Institute of the Johns Hopkins University). Mr. Lawrence performed widely on the classical guitar - in recitals as well as on radio and television.

Prior to producing films, Mr. Lawrence composed original music for over a dozen films, including Julian Krainin's Emmy Award-winning documentary The Other Americans, which won more awards than any other television documentary in 1969, and was honored with a special screening at the White House.

Lawrence has written, produced, and directed over twenty documentaries. His films have been honored by awards from major film festivals around the world. He has initiated personal film projects that have received production grants from both local and national foundations, including the Ford Foundation. The National Endowment for the Humanities funded three of his productions. Lawrence also serves as film editor on all his documentary productions.

In 1990, Julian Krainin and Michael Lawrence began working together to jointly produce documentaries, television movies, and theatrical motion pictures. Their first project was the documentary The Quiz Show Scandal, which Lawrence directed for American Experience. After seeing the PBS broadcast, Robert Redford became interested in the story and eventually directed the Disney Oscar-nominated feature Quiz Show, starring Ralph Fiennes. Krainin produced while Lawrence assisted by writing an initial dramatic treatment.

Michael Lawrence initiated the 2004 Emmy Award- and Peabody Award-winning HBO original movie Something the Lord Made, for which he wrote an original dramatic treatment and which Mr. Krainin produced. Michael Lawrence wrote and directed the first film ever commissioned by the Library of Congress, titled Memory and Imagination: New Pathways to the Library of Congress.

Lawrence's documentary Bach & Friends combines Lawrence's passion for music and filmmaking and was released in early 2010. Bach & Friends brings together many today's most renowned musicians and captures them playing Bach and discussing his legacy. The variety of performances in the film include Bach renditions on the organ, piano, cello, violin, banjo, guitar, double bass, ukulele, mandolin, glass harp, and string quartet. Among the film's many unique moments is a scene in which musicians are scanned in an fMRI machine in an effort to study the neural basis of musical improvisation.

== Filmography ==
- Bach & Friends, 2010. This two-hour documentary explores the power of Bach's music through interviews and performances including: Zuill Bailey, Manuel Barrueco, John Bayless, Joshua Bell, Harlan Brothers, Uri Caine, Simone Dinnerstein, The Emerson String Quartet, Béla Fleck, Philip Glass, Glenn Gould (in re-performance), Hilary Hahn, Matt Haimovitz, Mike Hawley, Felix Hell, Anatoly Larkin, Bobby McFerrin, Sid Meier, Edgar Meyer, Tim Page, Peter Schickele, Jake Shimabukuro, Richard Stoltzman, The Swingle Singers, Chris Thile, John Q. Walker, and Marc Wienert.
- Manuel Barrueco: A Gift and A Life, 2006. An hour documentary on internationally acclaimed classical guitar concert and recording artist Manuel Barrueco.
- Aaron Shearer: A Life with the Guitar, 2005. An hour documentary celebrating the life and work of Aaron Shearer "the most influential classic guitar author and teacher of the 20th Century."
- The John Glenn Story: A Return to Space and Return of the Hero, 1998. Two one-hour documentaries for CNN Productions with John Glenn and Walter Cronkite.
- Deadly Mail, 1996. The search for the elusive serial bomber, the Unabomber. HBO's America Undercover. It was in the final editing stage when Theodore Kaczynski was apprehended. Sheila Nevins (head of documentaries at HBO) decided to drop the project because the theme of the mystery man bomber was now known and no longer a mystery.
- The Quiz Show Scandal, 1992. A look at one of the most bizarre and disillusioning chapters in the history of broadcasting. American Experience, PBS.
- Getting Away with Murder, 1991. A true story of terror in the small Vermont town of Essex. Based on the book "Death of Innocence" by Peter Meyer, Lawrence's script was developed for ABC Television.
- Memory & Imagination: New Pathways to the Library of Congress, 1990. The memory bank of mankind. With Stewart Brand, Julia Child, Francis Ford Coppola, Steve Jobs, Ted Koppel, Penn and Teller, Isaac Stern, and Richard Saul Wurman.
- Plutonium, 1986. A 15-minute theatrical trailer. Key scenes from Mr. Lawrence's original screenplay for a low-budget thriller on nuclear terrorism. Screened at the Independent Feature Market.
- Lives of the City, 1982. A film essay on mankind's greatest invention: the city.
- The Mind of Music, 1980. An exploration of the magical force of music in the lives of human beings. A personal film essay with Yehudi Menuhin, George Rochberg, Gunther Schuller, and Dr. Lewis Thomas.
- The 30-Second Dream, 1978. The seductive power of television advertising. A look at the multi-billion-dollar fantasy world of television commercials.
- The Shared Experience, 1977. The evolution of human thought and culture. A broad look at information and the transmission of human experience across the ages with Noam Chomsky, John Kenneth Galbraith, Alexander Marchack, Dr. Lewis Thomas, and William Irwin Thompson.
- Koinonia, 1975. A look at daily life in a 40-member alternative educational and spiritual community.
- Spacecraft America, 1973. A satire on politics and media in America, focusing on Richard Nixon's second inauguration.
