= TIMARA =

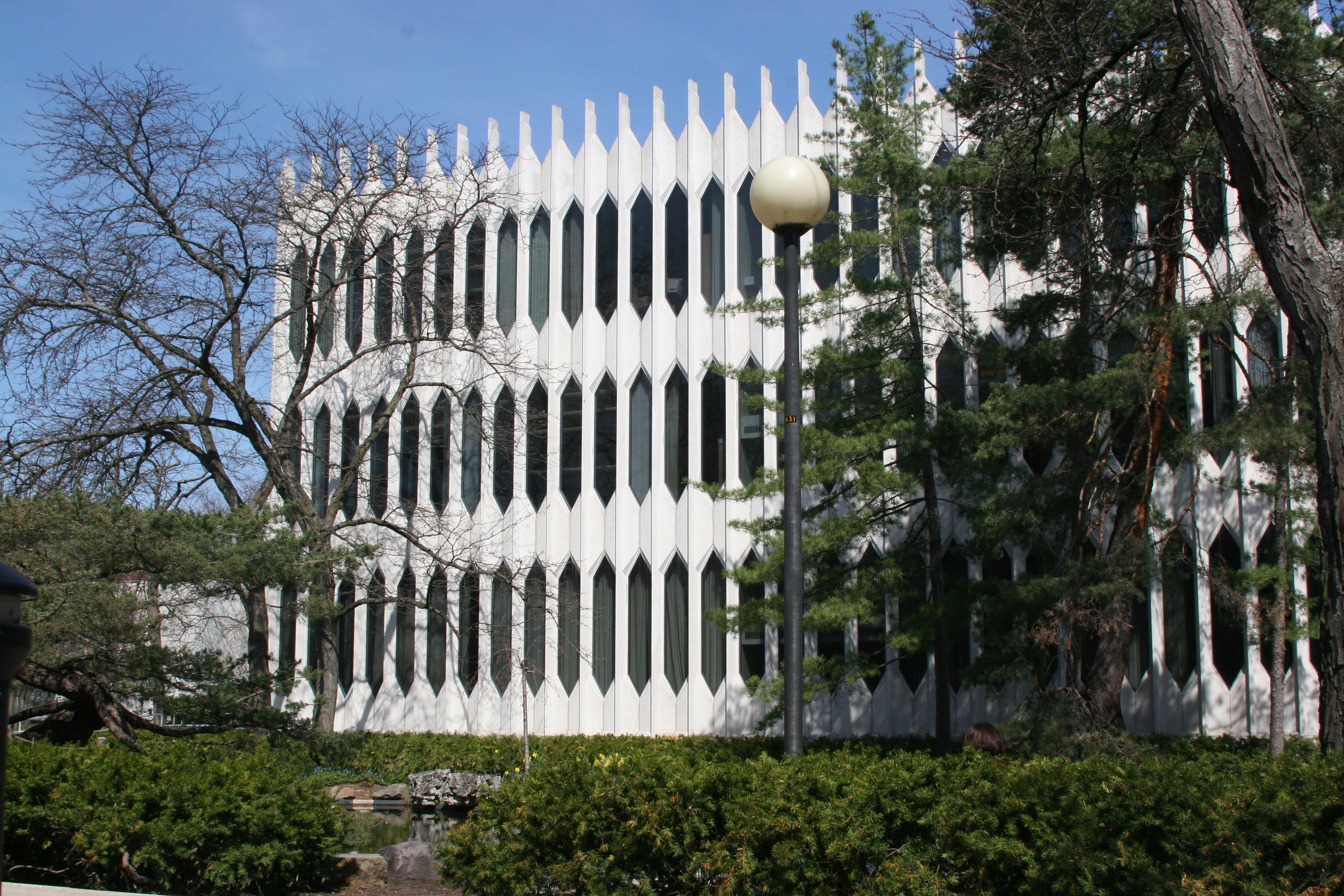
Bibbins Hall, home of Oberlin's TIMARA Laboratories.

TIMARA (Technology in Music and Related Arts) is a program at the Oberlin Conservatory of Music notable for its importance in the history of electronic music. Established in 1967, TIMARA is well known as the world's first conservatory program in electronic music. Department alumni have included Cory Arcangel, Christopher Rouse, Dary John Mizelle, Dan Forden, Amy X Neuburg, and Diana Starshine.

The major in Technology in Music and Related Arts is intended for students who desire a career in which traditional musical skills and understanding are combined with the exploration of the very latest techniques for musical expression. The program prepares a student for specialized graduate study in computer music, digital media and new performance.

== Early History ==
Oberlin's extensive history with electronic music dates back to the mid-19th century due to its relationship with inventor Elisha Gray. Gray, considered to be the father of the modern music synthesizer, served as adjunct professor of physics at Oberlin and following his tenure, was granted over 70 patents for his inventions.

Grey's electromechanical oscillator paved the way for another Oberlin physicist, Thaddeus Cahill, who created the telharmonium in 1877. The instrument, although no recordings have survived, is considered one of the first electronic instruments to garner international attention.

The TIMARA department was officially founded in 1967 by composer Olly Wilson as a response to the number of composition students who pursued studies in electronics. The program became the first in a series of departments in American universities to allow for experimentation in analog synthesis as well as mixed media art.

== Current History ==
TIMARA boasts multiple ensembles, including OINC (Oberlin Improvisation and Newmusic Collective) and Oberlin Synthesizer Ensemble (OSE). Silent Film Ensemble and Creative Music Lab have also been offered in recent years. Its current faculty include professors Tom Lopez, Steven Kemper, Eli Stine, and Francis Wilson, along with technical director Kyle Hartzell. Recent faculty include the engineer John Talbert as well as composers Morton Subotnik, George Lewis, David Lang, Gary Lee Nelson, Per Bloland, Joo Won Park, Lyn Goeringer, Peter Swendsen, Abby Aresty, and Heather Mease.

=== TIMARA Studios ===
The TIMARA studios, formerly known as the TIMARA Laboratories, consist of five recording studios. Each of these studios contains a state of the art audio workstation, including a Mac Studio computer, a mixer, and speakers, with several of the studios offering multichannel speaker setups. The workstations run ProTools, Ableton, Reaper, Max/MSP, Amadeus, Adobe Creative Suite, and other programs for editing and processing audio and video. The Analog Synth Studio contains the department's extensive collection of instruments, including original models of the ARP 2600, the Buchla 200 and the EMS VCS 3.

The studios were the recording location of Josh Ritter's eponymous debut album, as well as the original recordings of The Mars Volta, Chris Eldridge, The Yeah Yeah Yeahs and Liz Phair.

The laboratory was also the space where REAPER, a digital audio workstation, was first created.

=== Renovations ===
In 2017, the TIMARA studios were fully renovated and expanded. In this expansion, TIMARA added a makerspace with vinyl and laser cutters, a 3D printer, sewing machines, soldering stations, and other related tools. The makerspace serves as a classroom and research lab, focusing on themes including computer aided design, digital fabrication, electronics, electronic textiles, sound art installation, and new interfaces for musical expression, among others.

These renovations also included the addition of TIMARA's Performance Technology Lab (PTL), a classroom and multipurpose venue for installations and performances. Originally known as the TIMARA Gallery, the space was upgraded into the PTL in the early 2020s with the addition of a theatrical light and sound grid, a wraparound curtain, and green screens. The grid allows for flexible speaker, projector, and light placement to broaden the creative potential of the space.

=== Alles Machine ===
The Bell Labs Digital Synthesizer, better known as the Alles Machine or Alice, was an experimental additive synthesizer designed by Hal Alles at Bell Labs during the 1970s. The Alles Machine, the world's first digital additive synthesizer, used 72 computer controlled oscillators whose output was mixed to produce a number of discrete "voices." Only one full-length composition was recorded for the machine, before being acquired by TIMARA in 1981. Several commercial synthesizers based on the Alles design were released during the 1980s, including the Atari AMY sound chip.
