= Dandy (video game) =

1983 video game

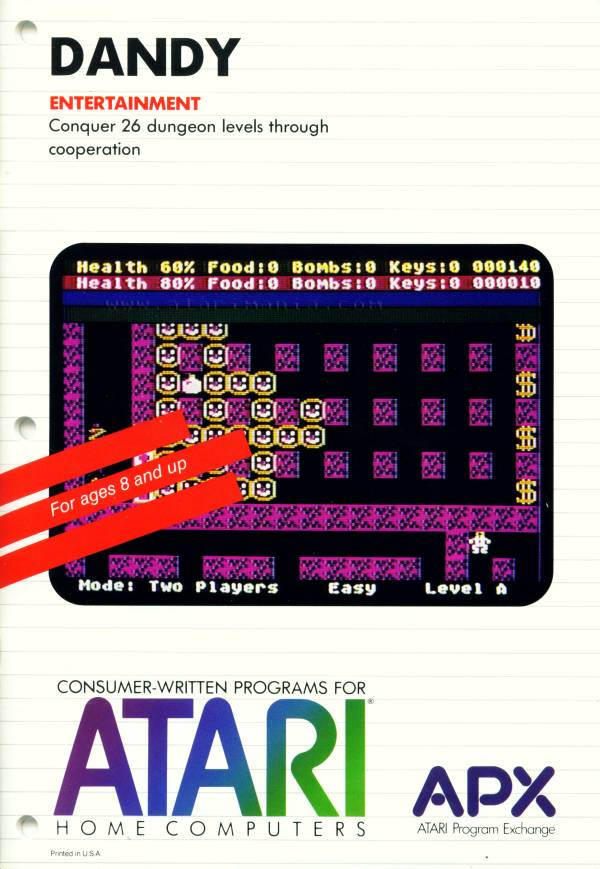
- Developer: John Howard Palevich
- Publishers: Atari Program Exchange; Antic Software; Electric Dreams; Atari Corporation
- Designers: John Howard Palevich; Joel Gluck
- Programmer: John Howard Palevich
- Platforms: Atari 8-bit, Amstrad CPC, Atari 2600, Atari 7800, Commodore 64, ZX Spectrum
- Release: 1983
- Genres: Dungeon crawl, maze
- Modes: Single-player, multiplayer

Dandy (later Dandy Dungeon) is a 1983 dungeon crawl maze video game developed by John Howard Palevich and published by the Atari Program Exchange for Atari 8-bit computers. It is one of the first video games with four-player, simultaneous cooperative play. Players equipped with bows and unlimited arrows fight through a maze containing monsters, monster spawners, keys, locked doors, food, and bombs in search of the exit leading to the next level. If a player dies, they can be revived by finding and shooting a heart. The game includes an editor for making new dungeons.

Dandy was written by John Howard Palevich for his undergraduate thesis while attending MIT, drawing inspiration from Dungeons & Dragons, Defender, and arcade maze games. Some of the levels and level design elements, which have become standard in dungeon crawls, were designed by fellow student Joel Gluck.

The 1985 Atari Games arcade video game Gauntlet built upon the core design of Dandy, and a lawsuit from Palevich was settled out of court. Gauntlet designer Ed Logg later called Dandy a direct influence. Electric Dreams Software published versions of Dandy for the ZX Spectrum, Commodore 64, and Amstrad CPC in 1986. Dandy was reworked into Dark Chambers by Atari Corporation under license from Palevich for the Atari 2600, Atari 7800, and Atari 8-bit computers.

The name Dandy is a play on D&D, the common abbreviation for Dungeons & Dragons.

== Gameplay ==
Dandy takes place in a maze-like dungeon, seen from an overhead view. The goal is to reach the exit in each dungeon and warp to the next. Dungeons are labeled "A" (the first) through "Z". Portions of the mazes are blocked by locked doors, which can be opened with keys found throughout each level.

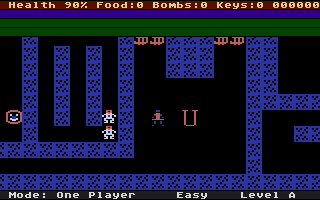
Atari 8-bit screenshot

Each player is armed with a bow and arrow which can be shot in eight directions. Monsters come in several varieties, though the differences are strictly graphical. When hit, the monsters "devolve" to the next less-powerful state, before eventually being killed and disappearing. Some monsters are placed in the maze during its pre-game creation and appear as soon as that level is entered, while others are produced in skull-shaped monster generators.

Monsters touching the player reduce the player's health, which can be replenished by eating food scattered around the dungeon. Potions destroy all monsters on the screen when activated. Potions can be either shot with an arrow, or picked up and carried for later use. A special "heart of gold" can also be collected to revive dead party members.

Players move and shoot via the joystick and use keypresses to eat food and activate bombs. With two or more players, the screen scrolls according to the average location of the group.

== Development ==
=== Thesis of Terror ===
The game that eventually became Dandy was written in the fall of 1982 as Thesis of Terror, Jack Palevich's MIT bachelor's thesis. The concept was for a five-person game: four players using an Atari computer as graphical terminal, and a fifth player acting as dungeon master controlling the action from a separate computer. The machines would communicate via serial ports. Time constraints prevented the dungeon master role from being implemented. The second machine, a Hewlett-Packard Pascal Workstation in the HP 9000 family, was used as a file server, sending new maps to the Atari on demand.

The gameplay design of Thesis of Terror was heavily influenced by Dungeons & Dragons; Palevich had never played D&D, but he had read through the manuals and watched campaigns in the lounge of MIT's New House II dormitory. It was also influenced by the arcade video game Defender (1981), which contributed the idea of the smart bomb (potions), and by several "half-forgotten" maze-exploration arcade games, which contributed the idea of using keys to unlock doors. Dandy was not influenced by any of the roguelike games, as Palevich was unaware of Rogue at the time.

Thesis of Terror's gameplay was designed with help from MIT freshman Joel Gluck. Gluck designed several of the levels and invented dungeon crawl idioms such as the "funnel trap", where treasure is placed in such a way that the players run to it, causing a wall of monsters placed just off screen to activate and charge the party.

Early versions of the game let players shoot each other. This was removed after testing showed that the game quickly degenerated into a free-for-all. Dead players originally had to sit out the rest of the game, but playtesters would start the game over when one member died. To keep the game going, the revival heart was added.

=== Creation of Dandy ===
After graduating from MIT, Palevich went to work for Atari, Inc. in the Atari Research division. He helped design the operating system for the unreleased Atari Sierra personal computer. He worked on the Atari AMY sound chip which was never used in a shipping product.

While working at Atari, Palevich continued developing the game. During the period from February to May 1983, the original was cleaned-up for release. The new name, Dandy, is a play on the phonetic pronunciation of D and D, which at the time was a generic term for dungeon adventure role-playing games. According to Palevich, the file server was removed.

Another change was to remove the ability to return to higher levels of the dungeon, after playtesting revealed that nobody ever went up to previous levels, except by mistake. Removing this feature sped up level changes, because the maze state no longer had to be written out to disk before the next level was loaded. It also enabled the game to work on cassette tape as well as on disk; on the tape version the cassette was stopped between levels, and then started again to load the next level.

Palevich programmed the game on an Atari 800 with an AXLON RAMPOWER 128K memory expansion card and the SynAssembler from Synapse Software.

== Release ==
Atari Program Exchange advertised Dandy as "the great new team game ... Bring up to three friends! Work as a team to battle monsters!", with a cartoon of four children exploring a dungeon. After APX folded, Antic Software published the game as Dandy Dungeon in 1985.

Typical Gauntlet scene, with treasure, monsters, and two monster generators

In the fall of 1985, Atari Games released Gauntlet, a project led by Ed Logg, with the same fundamental gameplay as Dandy. A lawsuit from John Palevich was settled out of court. During a speech given at the 2012 Game Developers Conference, Ed Logg said that Dandy served as a direct inspiration for Gauntlet.

Palevich later released the game's source code under the Apache License 2.0.

== Ports ==
Reception

Awards
Publication	Award
Sinclair User	SU Classic
Your Sinclair	Megagame

In 1986, Electric Dreams Software, having failed to secure the Gauntlet license, acquired the rights to produce the home computer ports of Dandy. Their intent to release their game as Dauntless led to a dispute with U.S. Gold who were publishing the computer versions of Gauntlet at the same time. Electric Dreams published the game as Dandy for the ZX Spectrum, Commodore 64, and Amstrad CPC. It received a Your Sinclair Megagame award.

In 1988, Atari Corporation released a Dandy-like game named Dark Chambers for the Atari 2600, Atari 7800, and Atari 8-bit computers (with the packaging in the style of Atari XEGS games). The manual states "Copyright 1983 John Howard Palevich. All rights reserved". It supports one or two players and has many fewer on-screen enemies than either Dandy or Gauntlet.
