= Bell Labs Digital Synthesizer =

1970s experimental musical synthesizer

Don Slepian at the Bell Labs Digital Synthesizer, 1980

The Bell Labs Digital Synthesizer, better known as the Alles Machine or Alice, was an experimental additive synthesizer designed by Hal Alles at Bell Labs during the 1970s. The Alles Machine used computer-controlled 16-bit digital synthesizer operating at 30k samples/sec with 32 sine-wave oscillators. The Alles Machine has been called the first true digital additive synthesizer, following on earlier Bell experiments that were partially or wholly implemented as software on large computers. Only one full-length composition was recorded for the machine, before it was disassembled and donated to Oberlin Conservatory's TIMARA department in 1981. Several commercial synthesizers based on the Alles design were released during the 1980s, including the Atari AMY sound chip.

== Description ==
The Alles Machine consisted of three main parts; an LSI-11 microcomputer, the programmable sound generators, and a number of different input devices. The system was packaged into a large single unit, and weighed 300 pounds – the designers optimistically referred to it as being portable.

The microcomputer was supplied with two 8-inch floppy disk drives (from Heathkit, which sold their own LSI-11 machine, the H11) and an AT&T color video terminal. It was connected to a customized analog-to-digital converter that sampled the inputs at 7 bit resolution 250 times a second. The input devices consisted of two 61-key piano keyboards, four 3-axis analog joysticks, a bank of 72 sliders, and various switches. Any of the controllers could be used to control any parameter, under program control. The inputs were interpreted and then used to generate outputs that were sent to the sound generators as a series of parameters. The bandwidth needed to control the synthesizer was quite limited. The computer could process about 1,000 parameter changes per second before it would bog down in the CPU.

The sound generator was fairly complex, containing 1,400 integrated circuits. The first bank of 32 oscillators were used as master signals, and generally meant the system had up to 32-note polyphony (see below). A second set of 32 oscillators was slaved to one of the masters, generating the first N harmonics, where N was from 1 (first harmonic) to 127. Additionally there were a bank of 32 programmable filters, 32 amplitude multipliers, and 256 envelope generators. All of these signals could be mixed in an arbitrary fashion into a bank of 192 accumulators. These were then sent to one of four 16-bit output channels, and from there to a digital-to-analog converter for output.

The actual waveforms were generated by looking up the amplitude for a given time from a 64 kWord ROM-based table. Alles used several tricks in the table in order to reduce the amount of math the system needed to run in the controller CPU. In one instance, a multiplication was avoided by looking up two numbers from the table and subtracting them, as it was noticed the result was the same as a multiplication of two related numbers. Running everything was a set of 255 timers with 16 FIFO stacks for events. The controller posted events into the queues which were then sorted by timestamp and fed into the generator in order.

== Influence ==
The Alles Machine was highly influential within the industry, but the cost of implementation was so high that it was some time before machines based on its principles were available at a price point most musicians could afford.

Crumar of Italy and Music Technologies' of New York collaborated to form Digital Keyboards in an effort to re-package the Alles Machine. The result was a smaller two-part system, with a Z80-based microcomputer and disk drives as one unit, and a single keyboard and limited set of input sliders as the second unit. Known as the Crumar General Development System, or GDS, it was released in 1980 for $30,000. It was sold to studios that needed a flexible system that could guarantee the same performance time after time. Analog synths of the same era were subject to environmental changes in the input controls that meant every performance, even after a short delay, would be different. Wendy Carlos owned a GDS and used it on the Tron soundtrack. She was also one of the instrument's most devoted users, and still uses it to this day.

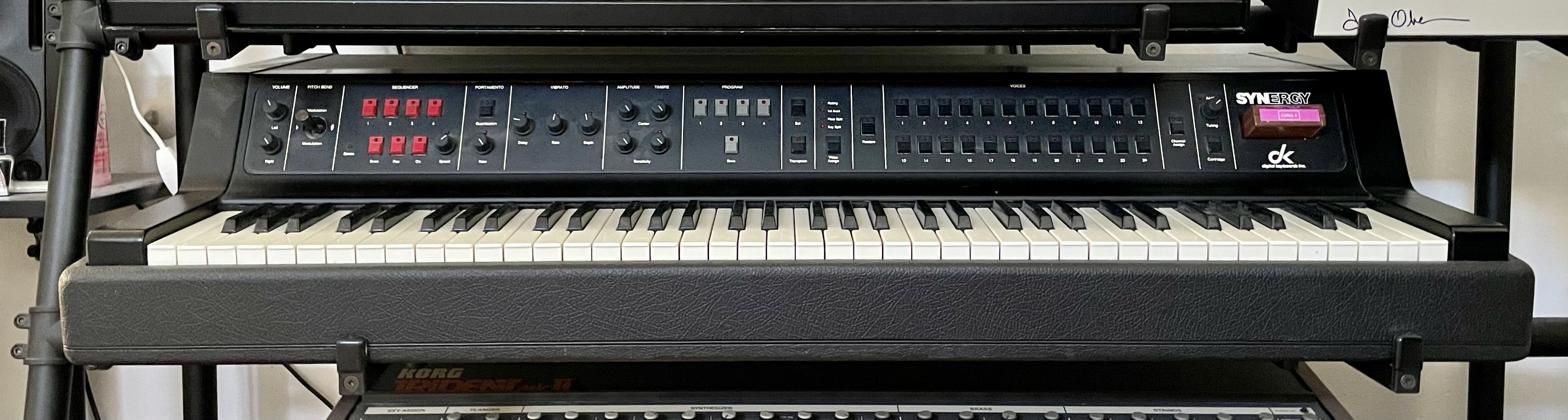
Digital Keyboards Synergy

Further work on the same basic concept produced the lower-cost Synergy, released in 1981. The Synergy removed the computer component, and re-packaged the entire system into a case with a 77-key keyboard. Another additive synth reached the market at about the same time, the Con Brio ADS200, at the slightly lower price of $20,000. Neither the Con Brio or GDS sold well, while the Synergy managed to find some market share. However, when the famous Yamaha DX7 was released in 1983, it quickly took over the market.

The DX7 used FM synthesis rather than additive synthesis. By modulating one oscillator with another at audio frequencies, FM can generate spectra containing many harmonic or inharmonic partials from only a few oscillators, whereas an additive synthesizer normally generates such partials individually. The DX7's six operators could therefore produce complex, evolving timbres with substantially less hardware than contemporary additive designs. Its $2,000 price point eliminated any competition from the additive synths. Production of the Synergy ended in 1985.

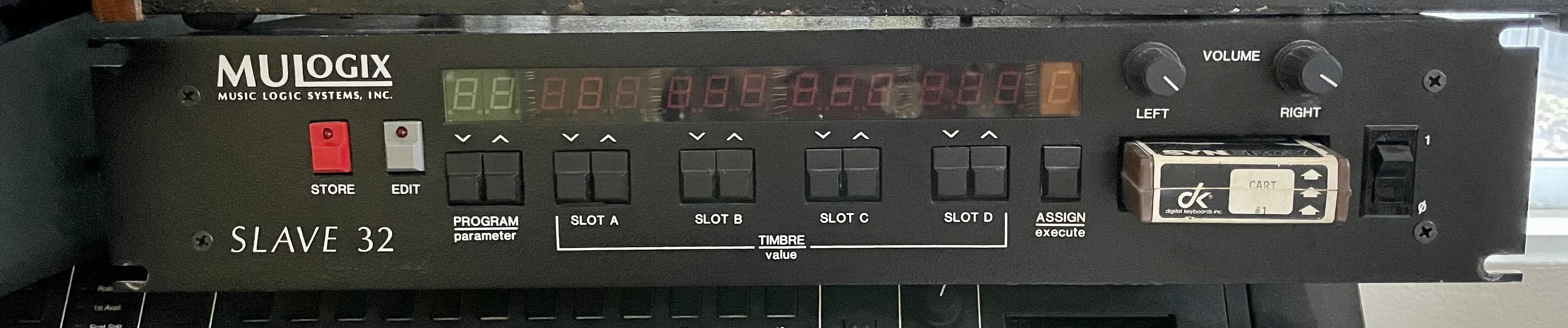
Mulogix Slave 32

A final version of the original machine was produced after Digital Keyboards was shut down in early 1985. Digital Keyboards' chief designer, Mercer "Stoney" Stockell, decamped and formed Mulogix with Jim Wright and Jerry Ptascynski. The Mulogix Slave 32 was a Synergy re-packaged into a 2U rack-mount module with a MIDI interface. The Slave 32 could read and write EPROM cartridges from the Synergy.

In 1981, Caesar Castro and Allen Heaberlin introduced their Casheab S-100 board. It also bore striking resemblance to Alles & Bayer's design. One early adopter was Roger Powell who designed his "Databoy" system around it. Powell used a home-brew 8800 system to scan the keyboard and modulation controllers as well as provide access to a custom library of sounds he created.

Starting in 1984, Atari started an effort to develop a single-chip implementation of the Alles Machine in their Sierra project. The resulting AMY 1 chip used 64 oscillators and added noise generators to provide special effects needed in games. However the AMY was never released, and a 3rd party effort to produce a low-cost synth based on the chip ended when Atari threatened a lawsuit.

== Artists who performed on the instrument ==
Two artists of note known to have performed on the Alles Machine are Roger Powell and Laurie Spiegel. Powell gave the first public Live performance. Unfortunately, this performance was never recorded. The other known performance is by composer Laurie Spiegel.

Several tracks on the album Games by Larry Fast (Synergy) were taken from sessions recorded at Bell Labs on the digital synthesizer.

Greg Smith is credited with playing a Synergy on the liner notes to Michael Jackson's hit "Beat It."

Composer and electronic keyboardist Don Slepian was hired as Artist in Residence in the Acoustics and Behavioral Research department of Bell Labs under director Max V. Mathews from 1979 to 1982 to develop works using the Bell Labs Digital Synthesizer. During this time he produced Sea of Bliss and Rhythm of Life, two full length pieces based on the Alles Machine.
