= Monument to the Dream =

1967 film

- Directed by: Charles Guggenheim; L. T. Iglehart
- Written by: Shelby Storck
- Produced by: Charles Guggenheim; Shelby Storck
- Narrated by: Paul Richards
- Music by: Robert Wykes
- Production company: Guggenheim Productions for the National Park Service
- Release date: 1967
- Country: United States
- Language: English

Monument to the Dream is a 1967 American short documentary film about the Gateway Arch National Park directed by Charles Guggenheim and narrated by Paul Richards. At the time of the film's production, the park was known as the Jefferson National Expansion Memorial. It was nominated for an Academy Award for Best Documentary Short.

== See also ==
- List of American films of 1967
