= Robert Wykes =

American classical composer (1926–2021)

Robert A. Wykes (May 19, 1926 in Aliquippa, Pennsylvania; - June 29, 2021 in St. Louis, Missouri) was an American composer of contemporary classical music and flautist.

He began studying the flute as a child, then served in World War II. He then attended the Eastman School of Music, obtaining a master's degree in music theory.

He taught at Bowling Green State University from 1950 to 1952, also playing flute with the Toledo Symphony. His opera The Prankster premiered at the University in January 1952. Later that year, Wykes left Bowling Green to study and teach at the University of Illinois Urbana-Champaign where he stayed until he graduated with a doctorate in music in 1955. He was appointed to the music faculty of Washington University in St. Louis in 1955, becoming a full professor in 1965. He played flute with the St. Louis Symphony Orchestra from 1963 to 1967 and with the Studio for New Music from 1966 to 1969. He retired from Washington University in 1988. He was appointed composer-in-residence at the Djerassi Foundation in Woodside, California in 1989 and was a visiting scholar at the Computer Center for Research in Music and Acoustics (CCRMA) at Stanford University in 1991. His notable students include Oliver Nelson, Olly Wilson, Jocy de Oliveira, Rhian Samuel, Gary Lee Nelson, Greg Danner and John Elwood Price.

Wykes's orchestral works have been performed by the Philadelphia Orchestra, the Minnesota Orchestra, the Saint Louis Symphony Orchestra, the National Orchestra of Brazil and the Pro Arte Symphony of Brazil, and the Denver Symphony Orchestra.

Wykes's music is published by Fallen Leaf Press.

== Works ==
Film Scores

- Monument to the Dream (1968); Venice Film Festival Mercuro d'Oro.
- Robert Kennedy Remembered (1969); Oscar and Cindy awards.
- MoPac Delivers (1975); An Industrial Film for the Missouri Pacific Railroad
- The Eye of Jefferson (1977); Cine Golden Eagle Award and Chicago Film Festival Silver Plaque.
- John F. Kennedy: 1917-1963 (1977); Cine Golden Eagle Award.
- Water: The Source of Life (1984): for the American Pavilion, 1984 Louisiana World Exposition.

Concert Works

- Toward Time’s Receding (1972); Orchestra.
- A Lyric Symphony (1980); Orchestra, Friedheim Award, Honorable Mention.
- Sonata for Flute and Piano, to Albert Tipton and Mary Norris, (revised 1982).
- For Cello (1989); Solo Cello, Fallen Leaf Press, Berkeley, CA.
- Three concert etudes: for flute alone (1989); Fallen Leaf Press, Berkeley, CA.
- 9 Miniatures : (three sets of three) (1993); Violin, Cello and Piano, Fallen Leaf Press, Berkeley, CA.
- Lake Music (2004); Solo Alto Flute, in New Music for Solo Alto/Bass Flute, Southeast Missouri State University.
