= Harold Blumenfeld =

- Born: Murray Harold Blumenfeld; October 15, 1923; Seattle, Washington, U.S.
- Died: November 1, 2014 (aged 91) Clayton, Missouri, U.S.
- Genres: opera, song cycles
- Occupations: Composer, conductor, educator
- Years active: 1950-2007
- notable works: Seasons in Hell, Borgia Infami
- Awards: American Academy of Arts and Letters; National Endowment for the Arts

Murray Harold Blumenfeld (October 15, 1923 – November 1, 2014) was an American classical composer. He wrote over thirty musical compositions. He was also a conductor, a music critic, and an educator, having taught in the Washington University in St. Louis music department for almost thirty years.

== Biography ==
Blumenfeld was born in Seattle, Washington, to Herman and Margaret "Peg" Blumenfeld. He was the eldest of three children. His family traveled widely, especially during the Depression, when his father sought work in retail. Near the end of his high school years, the family settled in St. Louis. Blumenfeld was educated at the Eastman School of Music (1941–43), where he studied with Bernard Rogers, but his studies there were interrupted by World War II. He later earned the Bachelor of Music degree at Yale University in 1948 and the Master of Music in 1949. His primary mentor at Yale was Paul Hindemith. He studied at the University of Zurich in 1948. During the summers of 1949-52 he attended Tanglewood Music Center, where he trained as a conductor with Robert Shaw, Leonard Bernstein, and Boris Goldovsky.

Blumenfeld was director of Opera Theater in St. Louis from 1962 to 1966. He directed Washington University Opera Studio from 1960 to 1971.

One of his students at Washington University was African American composer John Elwood Price.

== Works and bibliography ==
=== Musical compositions ===
==== Songs and song cycles ====
- Eroscapes (text: Isabella Tate Gardner), for chamber ensemble (Mezzo-Soprano Solo, Flute, Oboe, Clarinet, Bassoon, Horn, Violin, Viola, Cello), published by MMB Music Inc (MU.X081028)
- Songs of War (text: Siegfried Sassoon), SATB chorus a cappella (1971)
- Songs of Innocence (text: William Blake), double mixed chorus, with mezzo-soprano and tenor soli and orchestra (1972-1973)
- Elegy for the nightingale, (text: Matthew Arnold), baritone, chorus, orchestra (1975)
- Rilke for Voice and Guitar, recorded by Turnabout TV, 1978; and Vox Box CDX 5145, 1995
- Voyages (text: Hart Crane) (1978)
- Circle of The Eye: Eleven Poems by Tom McKeown for Medium Voice & Piano, published by King's Crown Music Press, 1982
- Diluvial from Illuminations, Symphonic Fragments after Rimbaud for Orchestra (1992), published by MMB Music, Inc., 1992
- Mythologies (text: Derek Walcott) (2001)
- Sterne und Stein, three songs after Rudolf Gelpke (2003)
- Songs of Cassis (2004)
- Oak, Feather, and Stone: To Friends Past and Present, Medium Voice and Piano (2004)

==== Music for piano and other works ====
- Transformations: expansion fugues for piano (1963), published by Seesaw Music, 1971
- Expansions, for woodwind quintet, published by MMB Music, Inc., 1970

==== Operas ====
- Amphitryon 4 (1963)
- Gentle Boy (1968), based on a story by Nathaniel Hawthorne
- The Road to Salem (1969)
- Breakfast Waltzes: bagatelle opera in one act (1988)
- Fourscore: an opera of opposites (1989)
- Seasons in hell: The lives of Arthur Rimbaud : opera in two acts, published by MMB Music, Inc., 1996. A first draft of this opera was completed during his 1992 residency at the Camargo Foundation.
- Borgia Infami: Opera in Two Acts (2002)

=== Writing and translations ===
==== Prose ====
- "Two Articles on Opera" (1952)
- "A Controversial Look at a Controversial Genius," Los Angeles Times, September 22, 1974. (On Arnold Schoenberg)

==== Translations ====
- Leoncavallo, Ruggero, I pagliacci: two acts (1955)
- Praetorius, Michael, The Syntagma Musicum of Michael Praetorius: Volume Two: De Organographia, First and Second Parts, Barenreiter Verlag, 1949, 1962; Da Capo, 1975.

=== Bibliography ===
- S. Jenkins, Jr.: "Waiting at the Gateway," Opera News, xxxii/26 (1968), 19
- J. Wierzbicki: "Blumenfeld’s Music," St. Louis Globe-Democrat (Feb 3–4, 1979)

== Honors and awards ==
- American Academy and Institute of Arts and Letters (1977)
- National Endowment for the Arts (1979)
