= John Elwood Price =

- Born: June 21, 1935; Tulsa, Oklahoma, U.S.
- Died: May 9, 1995 (aged 59) Tuskegee, Alabama, U.S.
- Occupations: Composer, pianist, educator
- Instrument: Piano

John Elwood Price (June 21, 1935 – May 9, 1995) was an American composer, pianist, ethnomusicologist, and music teacher. He composed approximately 600 musical works in a wide variety of genres. His works are widely performed in the United States by professional groups.

== Biography ==
Elwood began to study piano when he was five years old. He was a musical prodigy. In sixth grade he wrote a piece for piano that he performed at the graduation ceremony. In high school, he learned (and composed for) orchestral instruments. He earned a Bachelor of Music degree in piano and composition from Lincoln University in 1957. There he studied composition with David Baker. In 1963, he earned a Master of Music at the University of Tulsa, where he studied with Oscar Anderson Fuller and Bela Rozsa. He later studied music at Washington University in St. Louis, working with Robert Wykes and Harold Blumenfeld. From 1957 to 1959, Elwood was the staff pianist at the Karamu House, a historic Black theater in the Fairfax neighborhood on the east side of Cleveland, Ohio. He composed incidental music for theater and worked as a vocal coach. He taught at Florida Memorial College, where he was Chairman of Music and Fine Arts and composer-in-residence. He then taught at Eastern Illinois University, and finally at Tuskegee University, where he began his employment as the Portia Washington Pittman Fellow and artist-in-residence.

== Works ==
=== Works for orchestra ===
- 1950 Rhapsody Symphonique for piano and orchestra
- 1950 Serenade for Tulsa, for piano and orchestra
- 1951 For L'Overture, for piano and orchestra
- 1952 Dance for English horn and orchestra
- 1952 rev. 1955 Scherzo I, for solo clarinet and orchestra
- 1955 - 1975 Two Pieces for string quartet and brass

1. The Solent 2. Inertia

- 1956 Nocturne for a Winter Night, horn, harp and strings
- 1956 - 1,957 Episodes for piano and chamber orchestra
- 1957 Scherzo II, for Clarinet and Orchestra (Revision of Rhapsody Symphonique)
- 1959 - 1974 Concerto for cello and orchestra

1. Recitative 2. Spiritual 3. Variations

- 1963 rev. 1989 ... And so Faustus Gained the World and Lost his Soul (Whatever Happened to Humanity?), For chamber orchestra; revised version for orchestra
- 1968 Scherzo IV, for clarinet and orchestra
- 1968 - 1975 Harambee (Let's all pull together), for orchestra
- 1969 Concerto for piano and orchestra
- 1969 Editorial I, for orchestra
- 1969 Scherzo III, for clarinet and orchestra
- 1972-1973 Overture, for orchestra
- 1973 Scherzo for Cello and Orchestra
- 1974-1975 Two Pieces for trumpet and string orchestra

1. Spiritual 3. Jumpin 'Dance

- 1976-1978 Tutankhamen: Trumpets, trumpet, trumpet (tape), string orchestra and percussion
- 1979-1980 From Remembering the vainglorious Luminescene revealed on That Day ... at Olduvai, for orchestra
- 1980-1981 O Sun of real Peace, for chamber orchestra
- 1980-1981 Three Orchestra Pieces, for orchestra

1. Arawak 2. Citadel 3. Makandal

- 1983 Abeng, for horn and string orchestra
- 1987 No Ideology in the World (or out of it) is worth the death of a Worm, for chamber orchestra
- 1988 - 1989 Adams-Campbell: "Whosoever Will", for orchestra
- 1988 - 1989 Concert for tuba and orchestra

=== Works for band ===
- 1951 March No. 1 in C minor., For piano and wind band (dedicated to: Booker T. Washington)
- 1953 March No. 2 for piano and wind band
- 1954 March
- 1969-1971 Four Marches
- 1981 Booker T. Washington Speech: 1897 Boston, Massachusetts, for mixed choir and band
- 1982 54th Regiment, for choir and band
- 1982 We Wear the Mask, for choir, organ and concert

=== Masses and other church music ===
- 1957 Ps 2000, for baritone solo, mixed choir, woodwinds and brass, and percussion - text: the composer
- 1970, rev. 1975 - 1976, rev. 1977 Barely time to study Jesus, for seven readers, soloists and mixed choir, orchestra and percussion - text: Robert Chute poem about Nat Turner
- 1972 - 1973 Lest thou bless me, for speaker, mixed choir, concert band and organ - text: Robert Chute 3rd poem by black history
- 1974 rev. 1978 Magnificat, for alto, baritone, mixed choir, organ, woodwinds and brass - text: William Edward Burghardt Du Bois

=== Operas ===
- 1957 College Sonata
- 1972 - 1974 The Other Foot, Ray Bradbury

=== Theatre music ===
- 1955 Foresight of time and the university, monologue (a science fiction scene of the creation of the world) with clarinet, trumpet and percussion - text: the composer
- 1962 Entr'acte for "The chairs", horn, bassoon and piano - text: Eugène Ionesco
- 1965 The Tempest - text: William Shakespeare
- 1969 The Feast of Unity, for soprano, alto, tenor, baritone, mixed choir, flute, oboe, alto saxophone, two trumpets, two trombones, tuba, piano / harp, percussion, string octet, actors and dancers - text: Sam White, Sharon Lockhard and others

=== Works for choir ===
- 1953 Greenwood Rhythm, for dancers, mixed (or unison) choir, wind ensemble (clarinets, saxophones, horns, trumpets) and percussion - text: the composer
- 1962 -1963 The Damnation of Doctor Faustus, for tenor, mixed choir and chamber orchestra - text: Christopher Marlowe
- 1973 St. Peter relates an incident, for readers, soprano, tenor bass solo, mixed choir, (small) band and organ - Text: James Weldon Johnson
- 1976 -1978 Song of the Liberty Bell, for three speakers, baritone solo, mixed choir and orchestra - text: Lewis Allan
- 1985 - 1986 Harriet Tubman: Booker T. Washington speech Auburn, New York ... 1913, for mixed choir and orchestra
- Confession, for speaker, soloists, mixed choir and orchestra - text: Nat Turner "Confession"

=== Vocal ===
- 1954 rev. 1958 Suggestion for the Century, men's quartet and orchestra (dedicated to Russell Jelliffe and John F. Kennedy)
- 1969 Song on a Poem of William Blake, for high voice and piano
- 1983 - 1984 Mandolin, for mezzo-soprano / baritone and small orchestra - Text: Rita Dove

=== Chamber music ===
- 1954 Meditation and Change of Thought, trumpet, horn, trombone and tuba
- 1954 Fanfare and March, for trumpet and organ
- 1956 Hymn and Deviation (Brass Quartet), for brass quartet (trumpet, horn, trombone and tuba)
- 1956 Sonata for tuba and piano
- 1957 Blues and Dance I, for clarinet and piano
- 1959 Duet for horn and trombone
- 1962 Quartet for violin, viola, horn and bassoon
- 1967 Lament for dancers, clarinet, trumpet, trombone and percussion
- 1968 Sonata for trombone and piano
- 1968 Trio for clarinet, horn and tuba
- 1974 Fanfayre, five trumpets
- 1974 - 1975 Sonata II, for tuba and piano

1. Recitation 2. Rag 3. Spiritual

- 1988 On the Third Day ... Osiris Rose, for double bass and piano
- 1988 Where are you Robert Johnson?, For instrumental ensemble
- 1992 Isis and Osiris, for bass, keyboard, drums and dancers

For three instruments, clarinet, tuba and piano

=== Works for piano ===
- 1977 5 Folksongs

== Bibliography ==
- Evelyn Davidson White, Choral Music by African American Composers - A Selected, Annotated Bibliography, Second Edition, Lanham, MD: Scarecrow Press, 1996, 226. ISBN 978-0-810-83037-0
- Aaron Horne, David N. Baker, Brass Music of Black Composers: A Bibliography, Westport: Greenwood Press, 1996. 521. ISBN 978-0-313-29826-4
- Aaron Horne, Dominique-Rene de Lerma, String Music of Black Composers: A Bibliography, New York: Greenwood Press, 1991.
- Aaron Horne, Woodwind Music of Black Composers, New York: Greenwood Press, 1990, 145. ISBN 978-0-313-27265-3
- Jacqueline Lynn Pickett, John Elwood Price: A coalescence of life, culture, and music in his Jumbo Deviation and I for unaccompanied double bass, Center for Black Music Research (618 S Michigan) in 1996.
- Hildred Roach, Black American Music: Past and Present, Second Edition, Malabar, Florida: Krieger Publishing Company, 1992, 3668.
- Madison H. Carter, An Annotated Catalog of Composers of African Ancestry, New York: Vantage Press, 1986.
- Ruth E. Anderson, Contemporary American Composers: A Biographical Dictionary, Second Edition, Boston: GK Hall, 1982, 578.
- Carol Tomasic, Alice Tischler: 15 black American composers: A Bibliography of Their Works, Detroit: Information Coordinators, 1981.
- Eileen Southern, Biographical Dictionary of African-American and African Musicians, Westport, Connecticut: Greenwood Press, 1981, 478.
- Composers of the Americas: Biographical Data and Catalog of Their Works, Volume 19, Washington, DC: Secretaria General, Organizacion de los Estados Americanos, 1977.

== Awards ==
- ASCAP Award
- Ford Foundation Study Grant
- Phelps-Stokes Research and Scholar Exchange Grant
- Illinois Arts Council Completion Grant
