= Crumar =

Italian synthesiser manufacturer

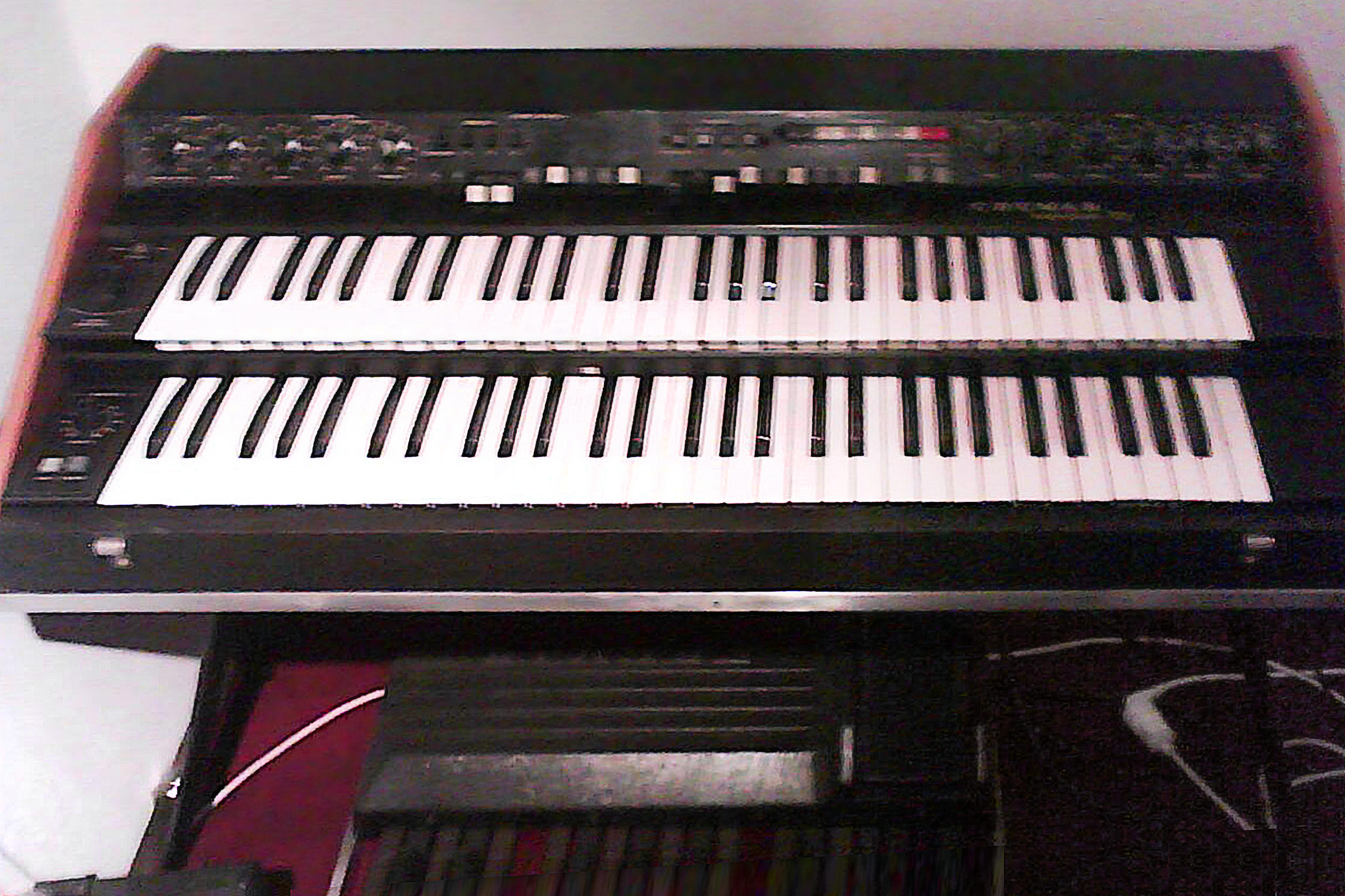
Crumar T2 Organizer (1978) drawbar organ

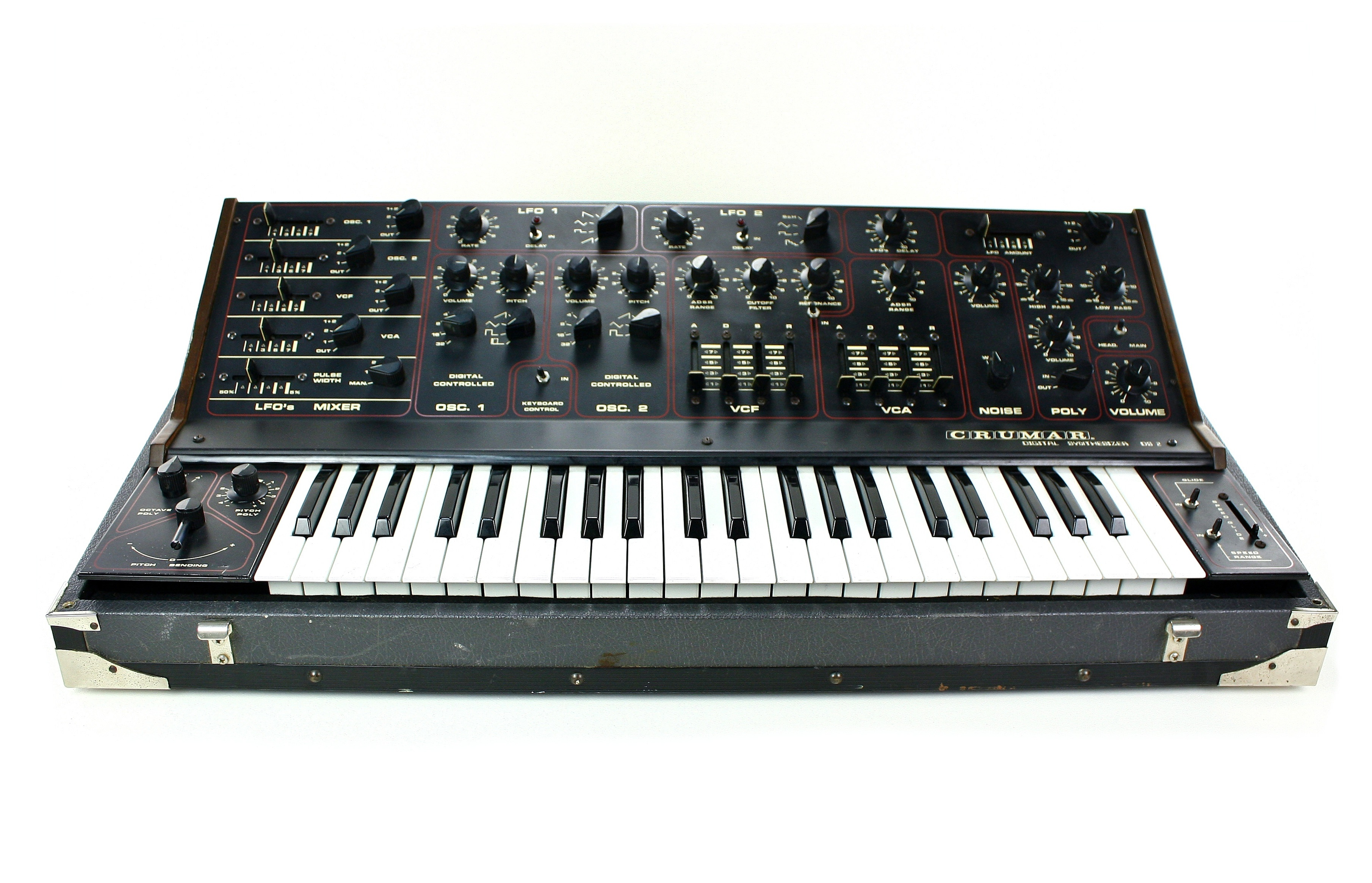
Crumar Digital Synthesizer DS2 (1978)

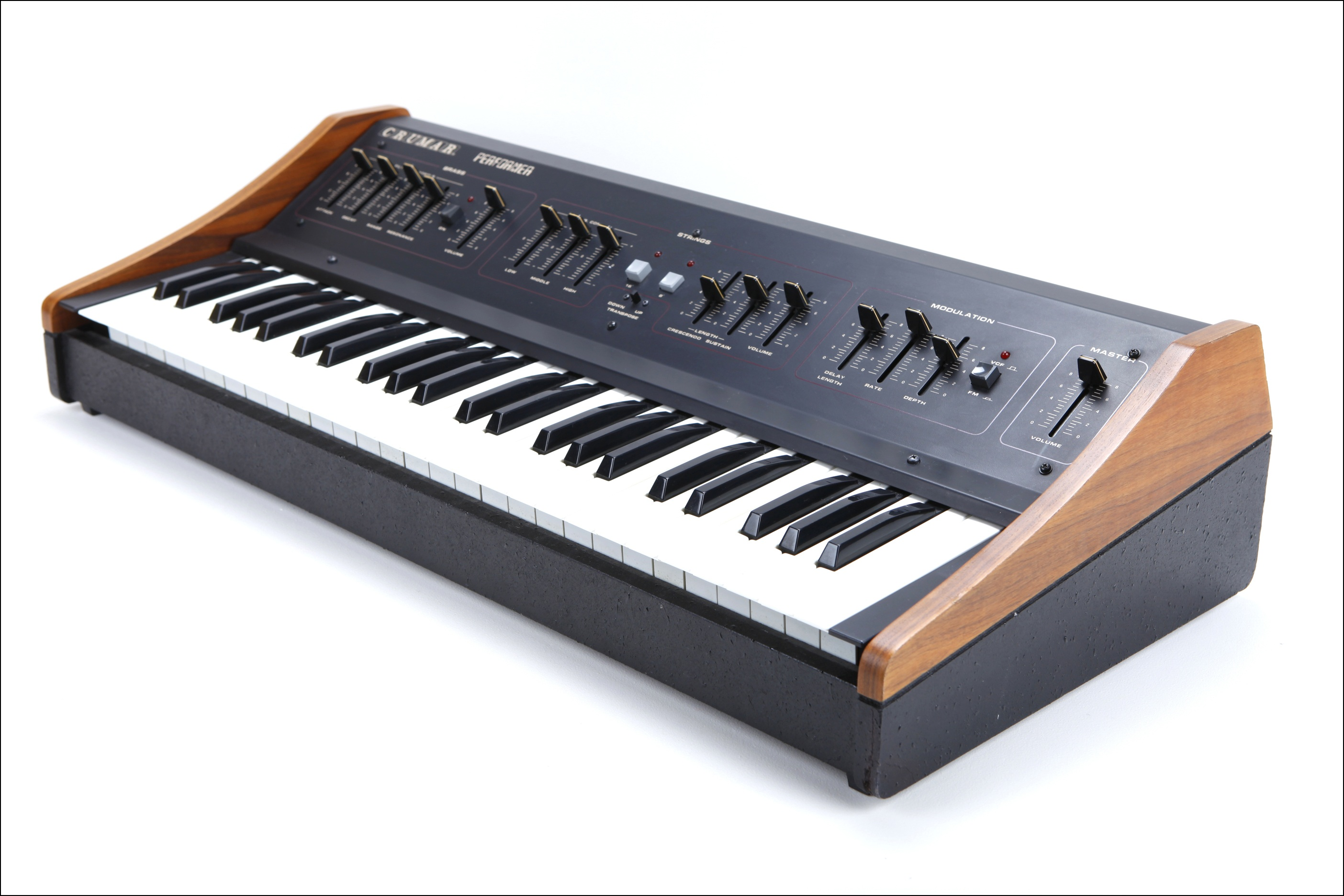
Crumar Performer (1979) analog polyphonic ensemble keyboard.

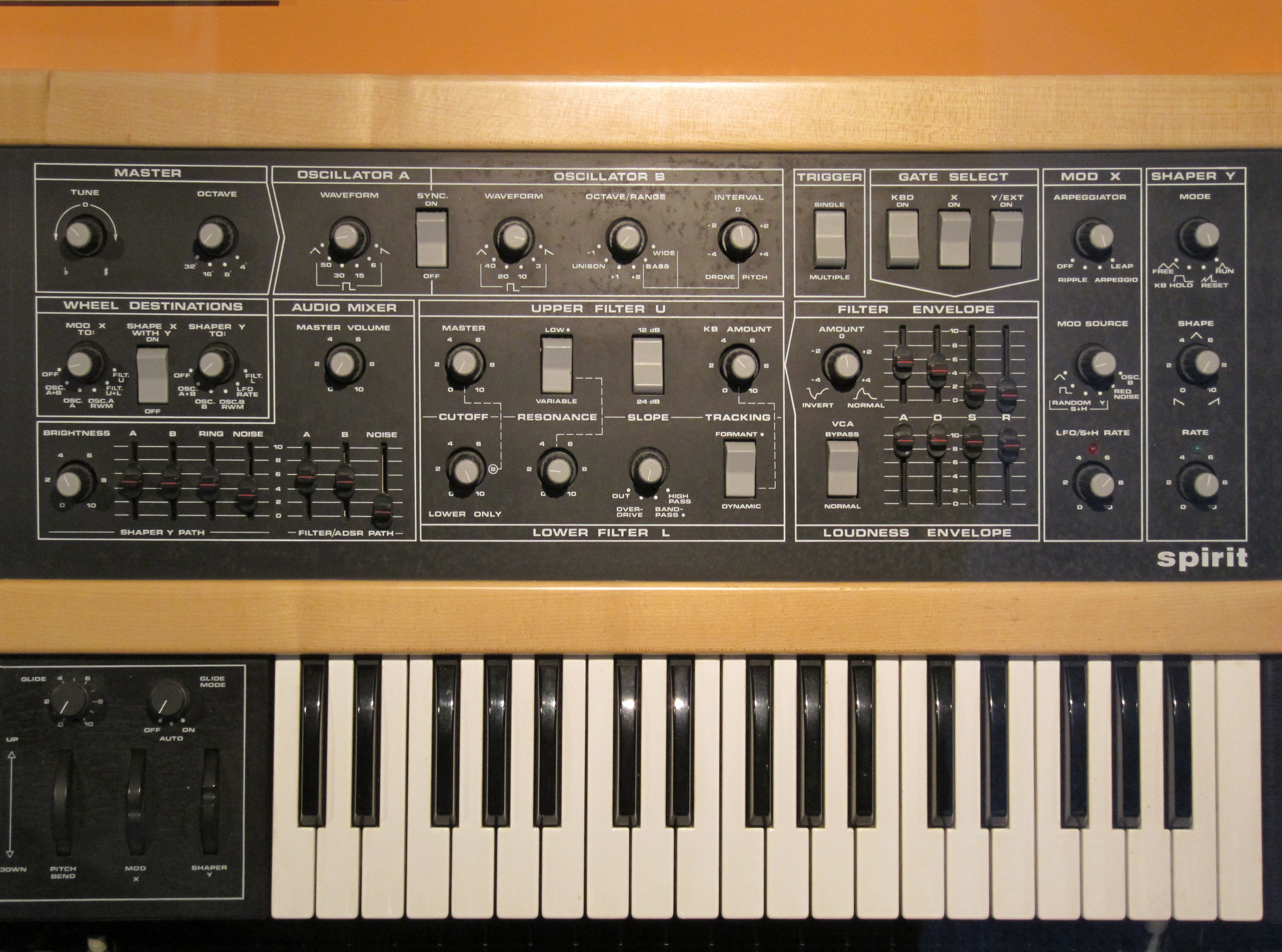
Crumar Spirit (1983) analog synthesizer

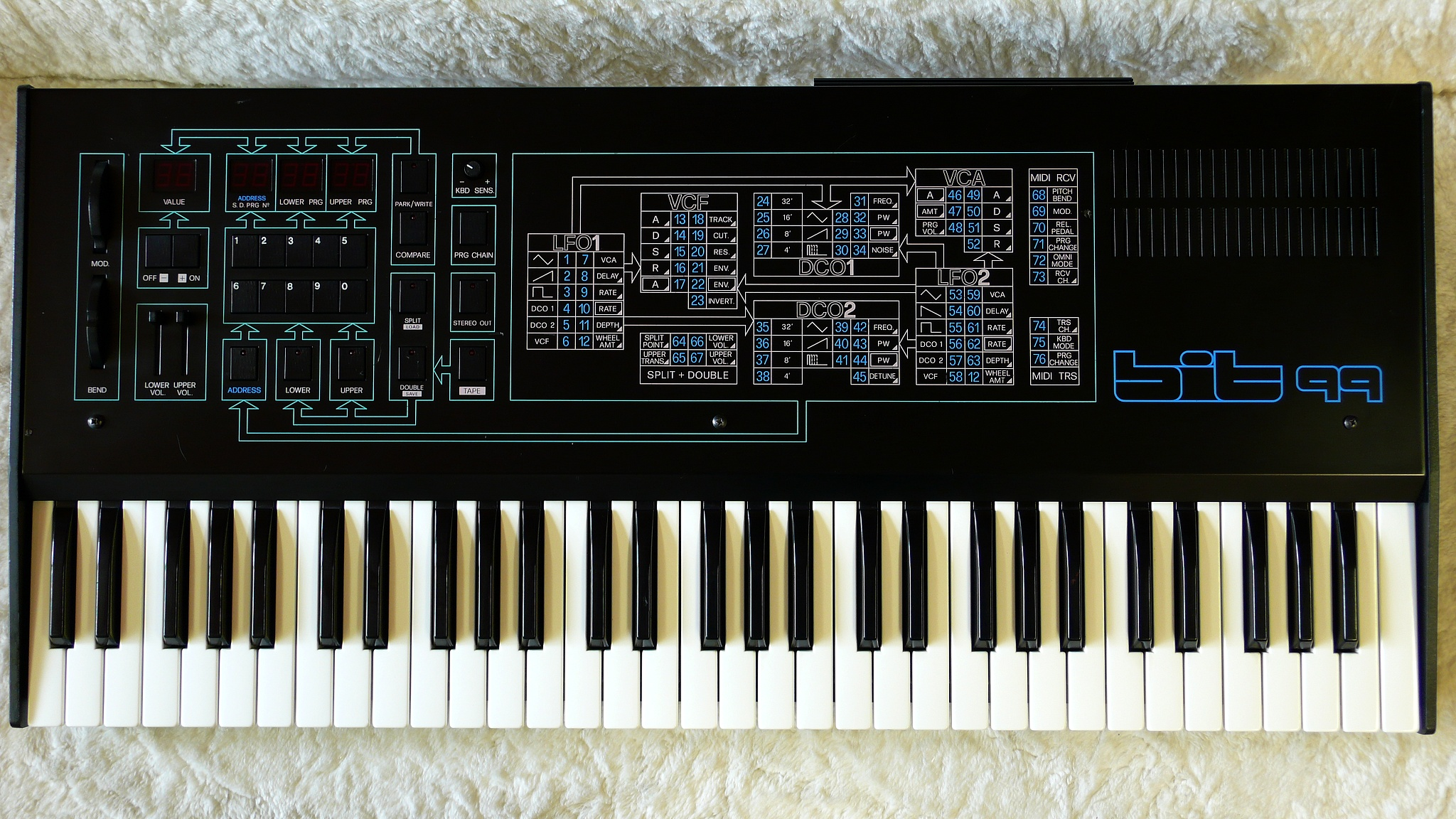
Crumar Bit 99 (1984) analog polyphonic synthesizer utilizing DCOs.

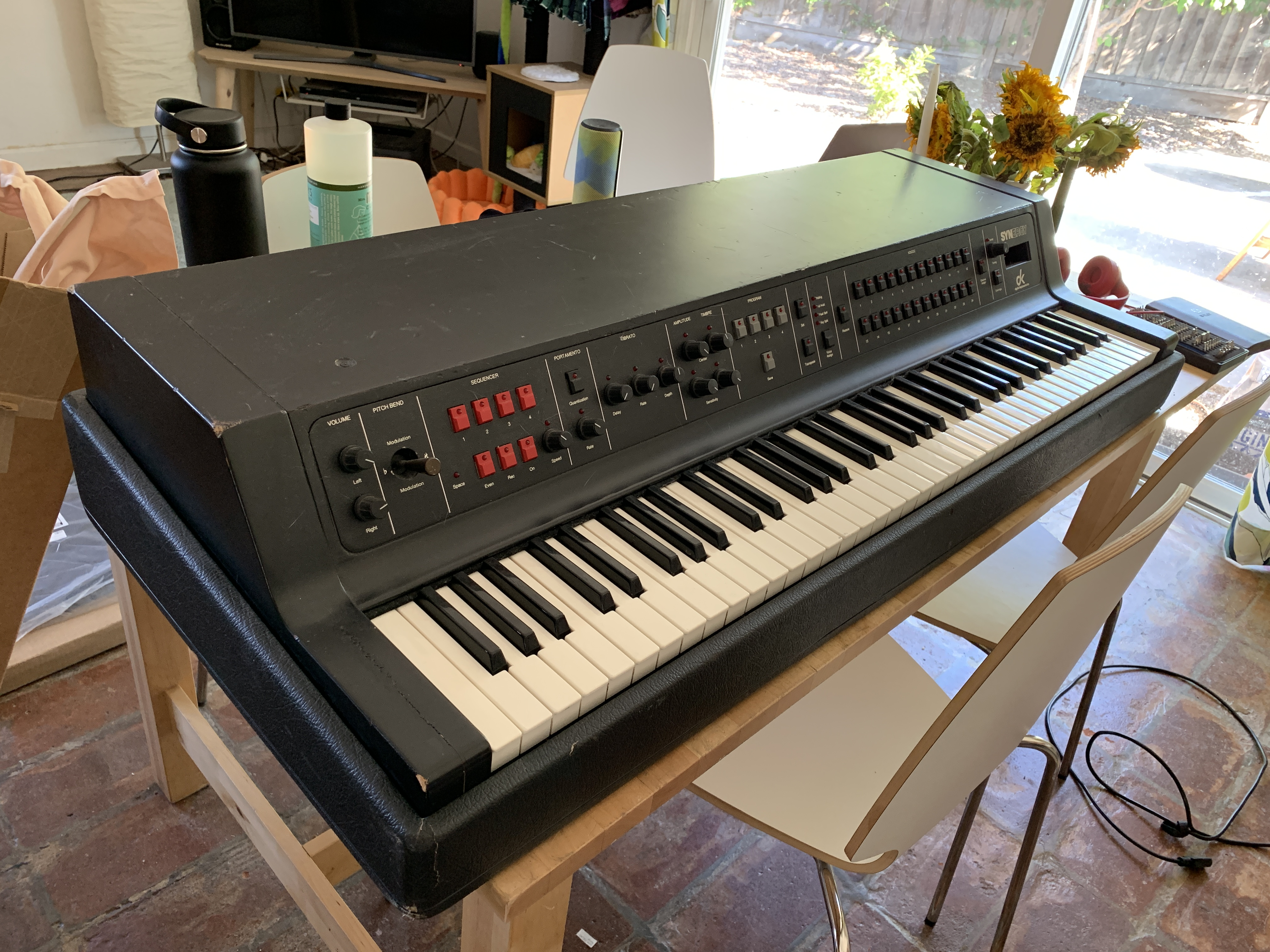
Digital Keyboards Synergy (1981) digital additive synthesizer with FM synthesis.

Crumar is an Italian manufacturer of electronic musical instruments. It was established by Mario Crucianelli in the late 1960s, and manufactured synthesizers and keyboards during the '70s and '80s. Its name is a portmanteau of "Crucianelli" and the name of his business partner, Marchetti. The company appears to have grown out of the Crucianelli accordion company and also continued to manufacture accordions under both names.

== History and products ==
Crumar started out manufacturing electronic pianos and string synthesizers, such as the Compac-piano (1972/1973), Compac-string (1973), Pianoman (1974) and Stringman (1974), the functions of which were combined in 1975 with the Multiman (also known as the Orchestrator), and in 1977 with the Multiman-S. The company was also known for clonewheel organs made in the 70's and 80's, such as the Organizer (1974), Organizer T1 (1978) and T1/C (1981), T2 (1978), and T3 (1981).

In 1978, Crumar released their first full-fledged synthesizer, the DS-2, which had one of the earliest digitally controlled oscillators (DCO). Crumar synthesizers are comparable and contemporaneous to Moog synthesizers and other analog synthesizers; in fact, the Crumar Spirit synthesizer (1983) was designed by Bob Moog himself, along with Minimoog co-designer Jim Scott and Tom Rhea (who wrote Moog manuals). In 1984, Crumar began producing polyphonic synthesizers utilizing DCOs under the Bit name (Unique in the US). The Performer is a polyphonic analog Strings and Brass machine produced at the end of the 1970s and is slightly compact with just 49 keys and is fully polyphonic (can play all 49 notes simultaneously). Programming is simple and clearly laid-out with just 15 sliders and a few buttons. A solid black chassis and wood end-cheeks round out this classic and often overlooked string machine. The Performer is best remembered for its Strings more so than its Brass and was used by Duran Duran.

In the early 1980s, Crumar formed a design/distribution collaborative with New York-based Music Technology (MT) in an effort to commercialize the Bell Labs Digital Synthesizer. Crumar and the MT designers worked in conjunction with some respected names in electronic music to produce the Crumar GDS (General Development System) in 1980, and the Digital keyboards Synergy in 1981. These synthesizers, which used additive synthesis technology and frequency modulation synthesis (or phase modulation), were bulky and cumbersome, but were state-of-the-art at the time. The complexity of this project, along with Japanese competition (notably from the Yamaha DX7) contributed to the company's eventual downfall.

Crumar ceased trading in 1987, just as they were about to launch a high-quality sampler at the lower end of the market.

In 2008 the Crumar brand was acquired by a new Italian company that soon began producing new keyboards under the Crumar name, including the Baby Grand piano (introduced at the 2008 Musikmesse), Bassman bass synth, and Mojo clonewheel organ.

In 2018 a digital electric piano called Seven was introduced. It featured modern day technology in a wooden vintage 1970s style case.

== See also ==
- List of Italian Companies
- Clonewheel organ
- Elka (Italian synthesizer manufacturer, also established by Crucianelli family)
- Bell Labs Digital Synthesizer
