= Olly Wilson =

American composer (1937–2018)

- Born: Olly Woodrow Wilson, Jr. September 7, 1937; St. Louis, Missouri, U.S.
- Died: March 12, 2018 (aged 80); Berkeley, California, U.S.
- Education: Washington University in St. Louis; University of Illinois; University of Iowa
- Occupations: Composer, musicologist
- Known for: TIMARA

Olly Woodrow Wilson, Jr. (September 7, 1937 – March 12, 2018) was an American composer of contemporary classical music, pianist, double bassist, and a musicologist. He was one of the most preeminent composers of African American descent in the twentieth and twenty-first centuries. He is known for developing a list of Heterogenous Sound Ideals that is widely used to dissect different aspects of music, with an emphasis on African culture. According to Wilson himself, "The essence of Africanness consists of a way of doing something, not simply something that is done" (1991). This motto is the basis of Wilson's work in the realm of ethnomusicology. He is also known for establishing the TIMARA (Technology in Music and Related Arts) program at Oberlin Conservatory, the first-ever conservatory program in electronic music.

== Biography ==
Wilson was born in St. Louis, Missouri, to Alma Grace Peoples Wilson, a seamstress, and Olly Woodrow Wilson, Sr., an insurance salesman and butler. He graduated with a B.M. degree from Washington University in St. Louis in 1959, and earned an M.M. degree in music composition in 1960 from the University of Illinois. His composition instructors included Robert Wykes and Philip Bezanson. He earned a PhD from the University of Iowa in 1964.

Wilson taught at Florida Agricultural and Mechanical University and the Oberlin Conservatory of Music (1965–1970). He was an emeritus professor of music at the University of California, Berkeley, where he taught from 1970 to 2002 when he retired. He also served as the chairman of that university's music department between 1993 and 1997. His notable students include Neil Rolnick, Robert Greenberg, Valerie Samson and Frank La Rocca.

He was commissioned by the Chicago Symphony Orchestra, the Boston Symphony and New York Philharmonic. He was commissioned by the 1979 International Contemporary Organ Music Festival at the Hartt School of Music for his organ work Expansions, which was premiered at the festival by Donald Sutherland.

Wilson's music is published by Gunmar Music (a division of G. Schirmer). His music has been recorded on the Columbia, CRI, Desto, Turnabout, and New World labels.

Wilson died March 12, 2018, in Berkeley, California at the age of 80.

== Heterogeneous sound ideals ==
Olly Wilson contributed to the study of African and American music by defining heterogeneous sound ideals that involve common themes in traditional African music: such as use of aspects of sound (pitch, duration, timbre and volume), usage of physical body movement in music making, and introspection of listeners. His heterogenous sound ideals are still used today to help identify different aspects of sounds in music.

== Compositions ==
- Prelude and Line Study (1959) woodwind 5tte
- Trio for Flute, Cello & Piano (1959)
- String Quartet (1960)
- Structure (1960) orch.
- Sonata for Violin & Piano (1961)
- Wry fragments (1961) tenor with percussion (J. V. Cunningham)
- Soliloquy (1962) for bass viol
- Dance Suite (1963) wind ensemble
- Sextet (1963) fl, cl, bn, hn, tpt, tbn
- Biography (1966) voice & piano (Le Roi Jones)
- Cetus (1967) electronics
- In Memoriam Martin Luther King (1968) chorus & electronics
- Piano Piece (1969) prepared piano & tape
- Piano Trio (1969)
- Voices (1970) orch.
- Piece for Four (1971) Piano, flute, trumpet, double bass
- The Eighteen Hands of Jerome Harris (1971) ballet for electraonics
- Black Mass (1971) electronics
- Black Martyrs (1972) electronics
- Akwan (1972) for piano (electric piano) & orchestra
- Spiritsong (1973) soprano, chorus & orchestra
- Echoes (1974) for clarinet & tape
- Sometimes (1976) tenor & tape
- Piano Trio (1977)
- Lumina (1981) for large orchestra
- Sinfonia (1984) for orchestra
- No More (1985) on Black South African poems, for tenor, fl, cl(bcl), perc, hp, pf, vn, vc
- Houston Fanfare (1986) for orchestra
- A City Called Heaven (1988) fl.cl(bcl)/perc/pf/vn.va.vc
- Viola Concerto (1992)
- Expansions III (1993) for orchestra
- Of Visions and Truth (1993) Soprano, Tenor, Baritone, fl(cl), tpt, tbn, perc, pf, 2 vn, va, vc, db ("I've been 'buked", Lullaby, "When I was three", "If we must die")
- Shango Memory (1995) for orchestra
- Hold On: Symphony No. 3 (1998)
- Episodes for Orchestra (2001)

== Awards and honors ==
- Elected to The American Academy of Arts and Letters, 1995
- Received a Guggenheim Fellowship in 1971, which he used to live in West Africa, where he studied African music and languages.
- Received a Rome Prize, 2008
