= Gary Lee Nelson =

American classical composer

Gary Lee Nelson (born Albion, Michigan, 1940) is a composer and media artist who taught at Oberlin College in the TIMARA (Technology in Music and Related Arts) department. He specializes in algorithmic composition, real-time interactive sound and video along with digital film making.

== Biography ==
In 1964, Nelson attended Utrecht University's Institute of Sonology in the Netherlands. He earned his composition doctorate at Washington University in St. Louis, where he studied with Paul Pisk and Robert Wykes. He has taught at Purdue University and Bowling Green State University. He was a faculty member at the Oberlin Conservatory of Music from 1974 until his retirement in 2007.

== Research ==
Nelson has worked at Bell Laboratories, the Swedish Radio Electronic Music Studios in Stockholm and at the Institute for Research and Coordination of Acoustics and Music (IRCAM) in Paris. He has been composer in residence and guest researcher at the University of Melbourne, Australia, Taiwan's National Chiao Tung and Soochow Universities, Hong Kong Baptist University, the National University of Singapore, Moscow Conservatory of Music and Yunan State University in the People's Republic of China.

== Teaching ==
Nelson has taught at summer music camps since the early 1960s. These include the Allegheny Music Festival, the New England Music Camp, and the National Music Camp (NMC) at Interlochen. At Interlochen Nelson was chair of the composition department. He also founded the NMC Computer Music Studio and established the NMC High School Synthesizer Ensemble. In the summer of 1991, he traveled to the Republic of China. In ROC, he led intensive workshops in computer music. These workshops included high school and college composers as well as teachers and other professional musicians.

== Concerts ==
Nelson's computer music specialties include real time interactive performance and "hyperinstruments." This term was coined to give focus to a new way that music is being made in the early 21st century. A hyperinstrument consists of a computer, a set of digital synthesizers, a performance interface, and software for linking them all together. Nelson chooses the MIDI Horn for his solo performances. The MIDI Horn is a digital wind instrument designed and constructed at Oberlin by music engineer, John Talbert. A Macintosh computer, and an array of synthesizers from Yamaha, Roland, and E-mu Systems complete Nelson's concert setup. He has performed more than 200 times around the world since 1987.

Some of his compositions are not amenable to performance by live musicians—live performances include an empty stage, with the music heard via speakers reproducing a computer signal.

== Prizes and recordings ==
One of Nelson's pieces, "Fractal Mountains", won first prize in an international competition for microtonal music at the Third Coast New Music Festival in San Antonio. The same work was chosen by Wergo Records of West Germany for inclusion in a compact disc anthology of computer music. In 1988, his “Amber Waves” was awarded first prize in music at “Contours of the Mind,” an international competition for computer-based art held at the Australian National University. “Morso” for solo flute and “Refractions” for MIDI Horn and synthesizers are recorded on Opus One.

In 1999, Nelson was featured in the online version of Discovery Magazine in a piece about fractal music. During the same year, he was awarded a grant from the National Science Foundation to develop a new course called “Algorithmic Approaches to Interactive Composition.” In 2001, his work on fractal music was featured on the “Pulse of the Planet” radio program broadcast on NPR.

== Grants and consulting ==
Nelson has received grants from the Ohio Arts Council, the National Science Foundation, the Sloane Foundation, the Powers Foundation and the Shansi Foundation.

== Boston Museum of Science Commission ==
In 2004, Nelson was commissioned by the Boston Museum of Science to create interactive software that demonstrated principles of genetics and evolution through musical sound and graphic animations.
