= Tom Lopez =

American composer of electronic music (born 1965)

Thomas Handman Lopez
- Born: Thomas Matthew Lopez; 1965 (age 60–61); Cleveland, Ohio, USA
- Occupation: Composer
- Website: http://www.firstwavemusic.com/thl/

Tom Lopez is an American composer of electronic music. Lopez is best known for his extensive history with the TIMARA Labs at the Oberlin Conservatory of Music, where he serves as professor and department chair.

Lopez graduated from Oberlin College in 1989 with a BA, received an MFA from California Institute of the Arts in 1993, and his DMA from the University of Texas, Austin in 2000.

Lopez has received awards from the National Endowment for the Arts, the Aaron Copland Fund, the Mid-America Arts Alliance, the Betty Freeman Foundation, the Knight Foundation, the Disney Foundation, Meet the Composer, the American Society of Composers, Authors and Publishers (ASCAP) and a Fulbright Fellowship as composer-in-residence at the Centre International de Recherche Musical (CIRM). He has appeared at festivals and conferences around the world as a guest lecturer and composer. He serves on the board of directors of the Living Music Foundation and the Society for Electro-Acoustic Music in the United States (SEAMUS).

Tom Lopez currently teaches at the Oberlin College Conservatory of Music and serves as chair of TIMARA (Technology in Music and Related Arts), a program established in 1967. TIMARA was the first-ever electronic music program at a music conservatory.

He is the former Director of the Computer Music Program at The Walden School.
