= Tom McKeown (poet) =

American poet and educator (born 1937)

- Born: Thomas Shanks McKeown; September 29, 1937; Evanston, Illinois, United States
- Education: AM in English, MFA in writing
- Alma mater: University of Michigan; Vermont College
- Occupations: Poet, educator
- Writing career
- Period: 1969–present
- Notable awards: Hopwood Award (1968), Helene Wurlitzer Foundation Grant (1972, 1975)

Thomas Shanks McKeown (born September 29, 1937) is an American poet and educator. He published his first poetry chapbooks in the late 1960s and continued to develop his reputation as a poet of surrealist sensibilities throughout the 1970s, publishing in major magazines such as The New Yorker.

== Biography ==
McKeown was born in Evanston, Illinois, to Thomas Shanks McKeown Sr., and Ruth (Fordyce) McKeown. He attended the University of Michigan, where he earned an A.B. in English in 1961 and an A.M. in 1962. He also attended Northwestern University in the summer of 1961. He earned an MFA in writing at Vermont College in 1989.

After graduation from the University of Michigan, McKeown went immediately into teaching, serving as a writing instructor at Alpena Community College, Michigan, from 1962 to 1964, and then at Wisconsin State University-Oshkosh, from 1964 to 1968. His growing fame as a poet enabled him to gain the post of poet-in-residence at Stephens College, Columbia, Missouri, 1968–74, and University of Wisconsin–Stevens Point, 1976–81. He then served as professor of English at Savannah College of Art and Design, 1982–83, and University of Wisconsin-Oshkosh, 1983–87. He once again won a position as poet-in-residence in 1989 at the University of Wisconsin-Madison Extension, serving in this capacity until 1994. Since then, he has taught poetry tutorials for correspondence schools and independently.

In the late 1970s, McKeown collaborated with composer Harold Blumenfeld, contributing a cycle of poems, Circle of the Eye, to a composition for voice and piano. The piece was performed at Carnegie Hall.

== Bibliography ==
=== Poetry ===
==== Collections ====
- The Luminous Revolver (1973 Sumac Press)
- The House of Water: Early Poems (1974 Basilisk Press)
- Driving to New Mexico (1974 Sunstone Press)
- Certain Minutes: Poems (1978 Scopcraeft Press)
- Three Hundred Tigers (1994 Zephyr Pub Corp)
- The Oceans in the Sleepwalker's Hands (Scopcraeft Press)

==== Chapbooks ====
- Alewife Summer (1967 Road Runner Press)
- Last Thoughts: Poems (1969 Abraxas Press)
- Drunk All Afternoon (1969 Abraxas Press)
- The Winds of the Calendar (1969 Road Runner Press)
- The Milk of the Wolf: Poems (1970 Asari Press)
- The Cloud Keeper (1972 The Seafort Press, Dublin)
- Maya/Dreams (1977 Wisconsin Review Press)
- Invitation of the Mirrors (1985 Wisconsin Review Press)

==== Vocal score ====
- Blumenfeld, Harold and Tom McKeown, Circle of the Eye : Eleven Poems by Tom McKeown for Medium Voice and Piano (1982 King's Crown Music Press)

==== Broadsides ====
- "Stones" (1975 Basilisk Press)

== Honors and awards ==
- Wisconsin Arts Council Fellowship (1980)
- Yaddo Grant (1973, 1975)
- Wurlitzer Foundation Grant (1972, 1975)
- Avery Hopwood Award (Summer), University of Michigan (1968)
