= Frank La Rocca =

American classical music composer (born 1951)

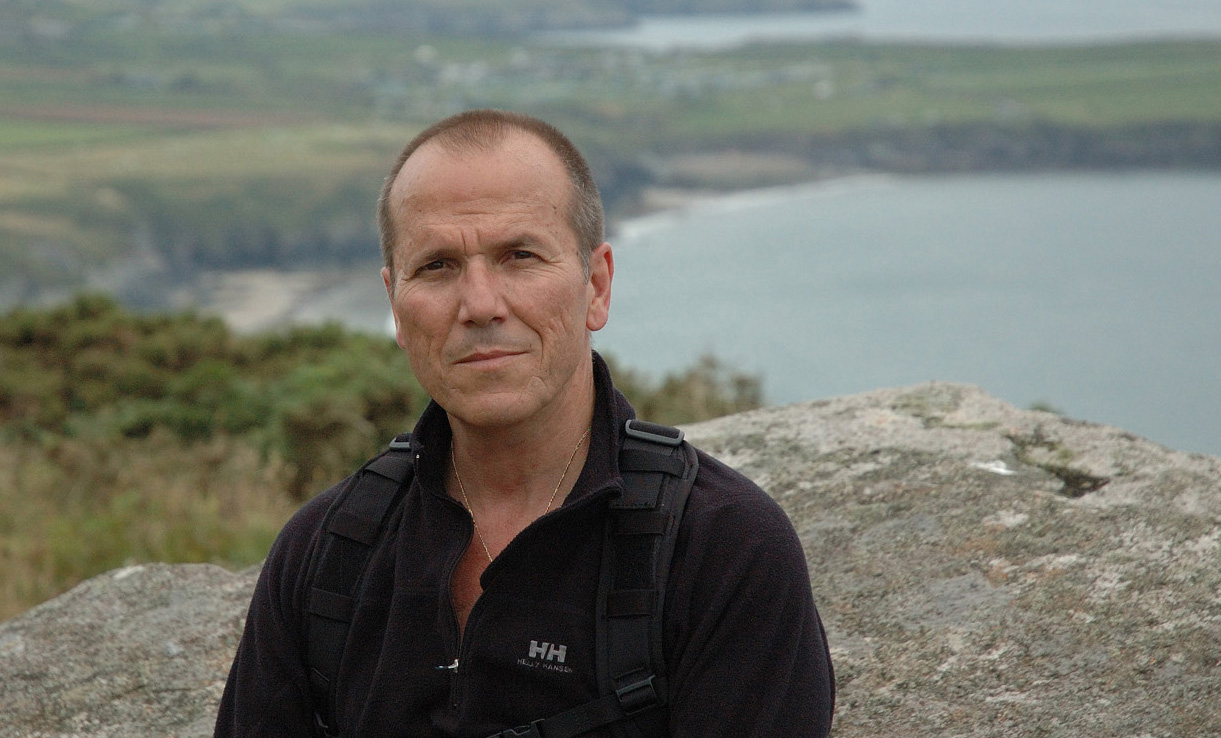
Frank La Rocca.

Frank La Rocca (born in 1951 in New Jersey) is an American classical music composer.

== Early life and education ==
Frank La Rocca was born in 1951 in New Jersey. He studied at Yale and at the University of California at Berkeley. His early musical experiences ranged from classical piano to playing electronic keyboards in various rock and blues bands. He began composing at age 14. His teachers included Edwin Dugger, Olly Wilson, Andrew Imbrie, Jonathan Kramer, Frank Lewin and John Mauceri. Trained as an academic modernist during his degree studies at Yale and University of California, Berkeley, La Rocca came to see this approach as a barrier to authentic musical expression, and spent many years in search of a personal creative language.

== Career ==
Frank La Rocca taught music theory and composition at California State University, East Bay from 1981–2014. La Rocca has been awarded several times for outstanding achievements as a professor of music California State University, East Bay.

La Rocca regards himself in the role of an advocate for a distinctively Christian faith, not through direct persuasion, but through the beauty of music.

La Rocca's music has been performed in North America, Europe, China, Japan, Korea, Australia, New Zealand, Argentina and Uganda. Performers include the California Symphony, Oakland Symphony, Lumen Valo, soprano Christine Brandes, Strata, Benedict XVI Singers, Artists Vocal Ensemble, Schola Cantorum of the London Oratory School, Young Women's Chorus of San Francisco, Cathedral Choral Society, San Francisco Girls Chorus, Prague Radio – Choir and Orchestra, Alexander String Quartet and others . His music is published by Boosey & Hawkes, Walton Music, Santa Barbara Music Publishers and Lumen Verum Music.

La Rocca has recorded for Cappella Records, Enharmonic Records, CRI, CRS, SCI, and ERM Media. Cappella's 2022 release of Mass of the Americas, produced by 11-time Grammy Award-winner Blanton Alspaugh, was in the Billboard Top Ten Traditional Classical albums for 2022. He was named Composer-in-Residence at the Benedict XVI Institute for Sacred Music and Liturgy in 2018.

== Awards and recognition ==
He has received grants and awards from the National Endowment for the Arts and the California Arts Council, and a Young Composers Award from ASCAP. He was a 2018 American Prize winner for the oratorio, "A Rose in Winter – the life of St. Rita of Cascia". Critic and composer Michael Linton said of 'Mass of the Americas', that it is "the best liturgical composition for the Mass since Duruflé." In the album notes of the album, William P. Mahrt, scholar of early music and president of the Church Music Association of America, writes:

Variety, ingenuity, sheer compositional skill, and liturgical suitability have made these compositions in The Mass of the Americas destined to be classics.

Composer and former music professor Martin Rokeach, wrote a review of La Rocca's Messe des Malades which concluded: “Masterpiece is not a word to be used casually, but to my understanding and my ear this Messe des Malades stands shoulder to shoulder with the great masterworks of the Renaissance.”

== Choral works ==
- Guadalupe Carol (2026) for Choir SATB and organ, text by James Matthew Wilson
- While All the World in Darkness Sleeps (2024) for Choir SATB and organ, text by James Matthew Wilson
- Stanzas for the Chinese Martyrs (2024) for Choir SATB, text by James Matthew Wilson
- A Hymn for Ukraine (2023) for Choir SATB, text by James Matthew Wilson
- The Music of Heaven (2022) for Choir SSAA, piano quintet
- There is no Rose of Such Vertu (2020) for Choir SSAA
- Missa Sancte Ioseph (2018) for Choir SATB
- Remember Me (2017) for Choir SATB
- Tantum Ergo (2017) for Choir SATB
- Ave Verum Corpus II (2017) for Choir SATB
- Ne Irascaris Domine (2016) for Choir SSAATTBB
- Ave Maria II (2015) for Choir SATB
- Qui Creavit Caelum (2015) for Choir SSAA and Violoncello
- Anima Christi (2014) for Choir SSATBB
- Tread Softly (2014) for Choir SSAATB
- Ego Sum Pastor Bonus (2013) for Choir SATB
- Diffusa Est Gratia (2012) SATB choir
- Ave Maris Stella (2012) for Women's Choir
- Nunc Dimittis (2012) for Women's Choir
- O Sacrum Convivium (2011) for Choir SATB†
- Iam Lucis Orto Sidere (2010) for Women's Choir
- Credo (2010) for Choir SATB†
- Ave Maria (2009) for Choir SATB
- The Divine Image (2008) for Choir SSAATTBB
- Ave Verum Corpus (2008) for Choir SATB
- Alleluia (2007) for Choir SATB, Organ and Brass (ad lib.)
- O Eve (2007) for Choir SATB and SSAA
- Cantate Domino (2006) for Choir SATB and Orchestra (or Organ)
- Sicut Cervus (2005) for Choir SATB
- O Nata Lux (2005) for Choir SATB and String Orchestra
- Resurrection Prelude (2005), for Choir SATB, Organ, Brass, and Timpani
- Miserere (2004) for Choir SATB†
- Echo (2004) for Women's Choir
- O Magnum Mysterium (2003) for Choir SATB†
- Ubi Caritas (2003) for Choir SATB
- O Vos Omnes (2003) for Choir SATB
- Eli, Eli (2003) for Choir SATB and Organ
- Magnificat (2002) for Women's Choir
- Psalm 23 (2002) for Choir SATB
- Expectavi Dominum (2001) for mixed Choir†
- In the Beginning (2000) for mixed Choir
- Exaudi (1998) for mixed Choir

†recorded on Enharmonic CD 12-025 "IN THIS PLACE"

== Liturgical works ==
- Missa Pange Lingua (2023) for Choir SATB and organ
- Messe des Malades (2022) for Choir SATB and organ
- Missa Sancti Juníperi Serra (2022) for Choir SATB, baroque flute and string ensemble, organ
- Requiem for the Forgotten (2020) for Choir SATB, low strings, organ and harp
- Mass of the Americas (2018) for Choir SATB, organ, string ensemble, guitar and marimba
- Missa Sancte Ioseph (2018) for Choir SATB
- Tantum Ergo (2017) for Choir SATB
- Ave Verum Corpus II (2017) for Choir SATB
- Ne Irascaris Domine (2016) for Choir SSAATTBB
- Ave Maria II (2015) for Choir SATB
- Missa Papae Benedicti XVI (2012) SATB choir and organ
- Missa Cordi Sacro (2010) SATB choir and organ
- Ego Sum Pastor Bonus (2013) for Choir SATB
- In the Splendor of the Holy Ones (2013) SATB choir
- Behold, a Virgin Shall Conceive (2013) SATB choir
- This is the Body (2013) SATB choir
- He Who Ponders the Law of the Lord (2013) SATB choir
- Christ, our Passover (2013) SATB choir
- Laudate Dominum (2013) SATB choir
- Diffusa Est Gratia (2012) SATB choir
- O Sacrum Convivium (2011) for Choir SATB
- Ave Verum Corpus (2008) for Choir SATB
- Sicut Cervus (2005) for Choir SATB
- Miserere (2004) for Choir SATB†
- O Magnum Mysterium (2003) for Choir SATB†

== Chamber music ==
- Veni Sancte Spiritus (2001) for Soprano, Clarinet, Baroque String Quartet†
- In This Place (2000) for Clarinet, Violin and Piano†

†recorded on Enharmonic CD 12-025 "IN THIS PLACE"

- Precipice (1997) for String Quartet
- Meditation (1991) Piano solo
- Divertimento (1990) for two pianos
- Secret Thoughts (1986) for Cello solo

Recorded on CRI SD 567

- Canti d'Innocenza (1984) for Soprano, Clarinet, Harp and Vibraphone

Recorded on CRS 8944.

- Frammenti (1983) for Piano solo
- Duo Lirico (1982) for Violin and Viola
- String Trio (1981) for Violin, Viola and Cello

Recorded on CRI SD 567

- Fantasy for Violin and Piano (1979)
- Phoenix (1976) for Clarinet, String Quartet, Piano and Percussion
- Night Music (1975) for Violin and Piano

== Major vocal works ==
- A Rose in Winter - the life of St. Rita of Cascia (2015) for chorus, orchestra, soloists and organ, libretto by Matthew Lickona 90'
- In a Dark Time (1989) for Choir SATB and Chamber Ensemble 20'
- The Pure Fury (1988) for Tenor and large Chamber Ensemble 25'

== Orchestra works ==
- Veni Sancte Spiritus (2001) for Soprano, Clarinet and String Orchestra
- While Orpheus Dreamed (1998) for Orchestra
- The Right Road Lost (1996) for large Orchestra
- Crossing the Rubicon (1994) for Orchestra
- No Strings (1993) for Symphonic Band
- The Pure Fury (1989) for Tenor and Chamber Orchestra
- Chen (1977) Prologue for Orchestra

== Electronic music and film scores ==
- Labyrinth (1977) for tape
- Newsical Muse (1975) contributor to Live-Radio Theater piece by Neil B. Rolnick
- Emergency (1974) Music for a Documentary Film
- Krystallos (1973) Music for a Documentary Film
