= Atari AMY =

Atari AMY, for additive musical synthesis, was a 64-oscillator additive synthesizer implemented as a single-IC sound chip. It was developed by Atari, Inc. as part of a new chipset, codenamed "Rainbow" that included a graphics processor and sprite generator. Rainbow was considered for use in the 16/32-bit workstation known as Sierra, which existed in prototype form circa 1983, but the Sierra project was bogged down in internal committee meetings. Rainbow development continued up until Atari's games console and home computer divisions were sold to Tramel Technology, which became Atari Corporation. For a time, AMY was slated to be included in the Atari 520ST, then an updated version of the Atari 65XE, the 65XEM, but development was discontinued. The technology was later sold, but when the new owners started to introduce it as a professional synthesizer, Atari sued, and work on the project ended.

== Description ==
The AMY was based around a bank of 64 oscillators, which emit sine waves of a specified frequency. The sine waves were created by looking up the amplitude at a given time from a 16-bit table stored in ROM, rather than calculating the amplitude using math hardware. The signals could then be mixed together to perform additive synthesis. The AMY also included a number of ramp generators that could be used to smoothly modify the amplitude or frequency of a given oscillator over a given time. During the design phase, it was believed these would be difficult to implement in hardware, so only eight frequency ramps are included.

Sounds were created by selecting one of the oscillators to be the master channel, and then attaching other oscillators and ramps to it, with their frequency being some multiple of the master frequency. Sound programs then sent the AMY a series of instructions setting the master frequency, and instructions on how quickly to ramp to new values. The output of the multiple oscillators was then summed and sent to the output. The AMY allowed the oscillators to be combined in any fashion, two at a time, to produce up to eight output channels. The output was then converted to analog in a separate (user-provided) digital-to-analog converter.

While the additive synth system works well for sounds with a narrow spectrum, it is not useful for wider spectrum sounds like white noise. To fill the need to generate the sounds of explosions, jet engines and similar sounds, AMY also included random noise generators that could be mixed into the master oscillator to randomly shift the output.

The AMY was particularly useful for digital sound playback given the limited memory and bandwidth resources available at the time. An input sample could be run through a Fast Fourier transform to extract the spectral pattern, and then that pattern could be input to the AMY to set up the oscillators. The result is a highly accurate rendition of the original signal, but reduced to a handful of parameters that could easily be stored. That pattern could then be shifted up or down simply by changing the frequency of the master oscillator, with the secondary oscillators following those changes naturally. In one experiment, telephone-quality voice audio was produced using this method, requiring only 2400 baud of bandwidth.

== History ==
Amy was developed as an experiment within the Sunnyvale Research Lab (SRL) of Atari, starting in 1983. Amy's system design was based on Hal Alles' experimental work at Bell Labs during the 1970s, which produced a similar system that required several racks of equipment to implement the so-called Alles Machine. Several of Alles' solutions to particularly thorny implementation issues were used in Amy. The Amy team was led by Gary Sikorski, and the primary architects were Scott Foster and Steve Saunders. The single-chip implementation was handled by Sam Nicolino, while Jack Palevich (Note: Better known for his game Dandy.) and Tom Zimmerman wrote support software.

Amy was announced in an Atari-internal mailing list in March 1984, with a short description and a June estimated time frame for shipping the first version, the AMY-1, with volume quantities available that December. The first versions would run up to 5 MHz, but a second run improved this to 10 MHz. Spec sheets listed 4 and 8 MHz as the basic clock speeds, respectively.

The initial target for Amy was a 16/32-bit computer also being designed by SRL, known as the Atari Sierra. Sierra used Amy for sound and a pair of chips code-named "Gold" and "Silver" for graphics, and was considering either the intel 286 or Motorola 68000 as its CPU. Sierra was one of several similar projects being carried out in different Atari divisions, although they used different sound hardware.

By the time the AMY-1 was ready for production, Atari was in disarray. In July, Jack Tramiel bought Atari from Warner Communications and quickly dismantled the majority of Atari's engineering departments. The Sierra project quickly broke up.

=== 520ST ===
Early news articles and development notes for the 520ST mention the AMY as its sound unit. By the time it was released, the AMY had been replaced by the off-the-shelf Yamaha YM2149.

=== 65XEM ===
During this process, the Amy team persuaded management to adapt it for use in the 8-bit computers. The result was the 65XEM, which combined the existing 65XE with the AMY. First shown publicly at the Consumer Electronics Show in January 1985, the XEM carried a premium $30 to $50 above the basic 65XE, which was also being launched at the same show.

However, as the company's focus quickly shifted from the 8-bit line to the new ST's being launched at the same time, the XEM was shunted aside and never released commercially. A few prototypes were built, some of which later found their way into the hands of private museums.

=== Sight & Sound ===
Tramiel later decided to sell off the technology, and reached an agreement with the Milwaukee-based company, Sight & Sound. They developed a new version with 32 oscillators, along with a rack-mount MIDI synthesizer based on it. However, as they were preparing to ship the product, Atari threatened to sue them, and the system never shipped.
