= Arthur C. Clarke's Mysterious Universe =

1994 British television series

- Genre: Documentary television
- Directed by: Peter Jones; Michael Weigall; Charles Flynn
- Narrated by: Carol Vorderman
- Country of origin: United Kingdom
- No. of seasons: 1
- No. of episodes: 26

Production
- Producer: John Fairley
- Running time: 25 minutes
- Production company: Yorkshire Television

Original release
- Network: Discovery Channel
- Release: 15 July 1994 – 6 January 1995

Related
- Arthur C. Clarke's Mysterious World; Arthur C. Clarke's World of Strange Powers

Arthur C. Clarke's Mysterious Universe is a 26-part television series looking at unexplained phenomena across the universe. It was first broadcast in the United Kingdom by independent television network Discovery Channel. It premiered on 15 July 1994. It was the sequel to Arthur C. Clarke's Mysterious World and Arthur C. Clarke's World of Strange Powers.

The series is introduced by acclaimed science fiction writer Arthur C. Clarke in short sequences filmed at his home in Sri Lanka, with individual episodes narrated by Carol Vorderman. The series was produced by John Fairley and directed by Peter Jones, Michael Weigall and Charles Flynn.

== Episodes ==
Arthur C. Clarke's Mysterious Universe consisted of 26 episodes.

No.	Title	Original air date	Description
1	"Snake Charmers, Wolf Children and Holy Men"	1994-07-15	Topics include snake charming, Frank Wall, Romulus Whitaker, Francis Xavier, Bascilica of Bom Jesus, Indian rope trick, Amala and Kamala, Iron pillar of Delhi, Basava Premanand.
2	"On the Trail of the Big Cats"	1994-07-22	Topics include Punanai, British big cats, Thylacine, Galloway Puma.
3	"Where Giants Walked"	1994-07-29	Topics include Easter Island, Moai, Jo Anne Van Tilburg, Pavel Pavel, Jacob Roggeveen, Thor Heyerdahl, William Liller.
4	"Relics of the Saints"	1994-08-05	Topics include Temple of the Tooth, Margaret Clitherow, Bar Convent, Shroud of Turin, Walter McCrone, Shroud of Turin Research Project, Januarius.
5	"Mysteries of the Sea"	1994-08-12	Topics include Flanna Isles Lighthouse, Mermaid, Mirage, Dugong, Fiji mermaid, Elephant bird, Mary Celeste.
6	"Psychic Detectives"	1994-08-19	Topics include Psychic detective.
7	"Keys to the Past"	1994-08-26	Topics include Madeleine Colani, Plain of Jars, Hand axe, Didyma.
8	"The Burning Question"	1994-09-02	Topics include Death of Mary Reeser, John E. Heymer, Bleak House, Spontaneous Human Combustion.
9	"A Crop of Circles"	1994-09-09	Topics include Crop circle, Dowsing, Ley line, Terence Meaden, Duff-Gordon baronets.
10	"At Death's Door"	1994-09-16	Topics include Melvin L. Morse, Near-death experience, 21 grams experiment, Out-of-body experience, Oakland firestorm of 1991, Howard Storm.
11	"Callers from the Cosmos"	1994-09-23	Topics include Howard Menger, Barney and Betty Hill incident, John E. Mack, Alien abduction, Cydonia (Mars), Oak Ridge Observatory.
12	"The Evil Eye"	1994-09-30	Topics include Fyvie Castle, Curse of the Billy Goat, Curse of the pharaohs, Zahi Hawass, Robert Ellis Cahill, Giles Corey.
13	"Secrets of the Pyramids"	1994-10-07	Topics include Giza pyramid complex, Farouk El-Baz, Robert Bauval, Orion correlation theory, Zahi Hawass, Upuaut Project.
14	"Mysteries of the Maya"	1994-10-14	Topics include Maya civilization, Tikal, Maya Ballgame, David Stuart, Tulum, Copán.
15	"Squaring the Bermuda Triangle"	1994-10-21	Topics include Bermuda Triangle, Flight 19, Joshua Slocum, List of Bermuda Triangle incidents, SS Marine Sulphur Queen.
16	"Doom of the Dinosaurs"	1994-10-28	Topics include Kirk Johnson (scientist), Cretaceous-Paleogene boundary, Cretaceous-Paleogene extinction event, Chicxulub crater, Luis Walter Alvarez, Alvarez hypothesis, Egg paleopathology.
17	"Cracking Codes: Writings, Runes and Other Riddles"	1994-11-04	Topics include Vinland Map, Robert McGhee (archaeologist), Kensington Runestone, Birgitta Wallace, Beale ciphers, Voynich manuscript, Robert Brumbaugh.
18	"Zombies: The Living Dead"	1994-11-11	Topics include Haitian Vodou, Zombie, Tetrodotoxin, Clairvius Narcisse.
19	"Strange Powers of Animals"	1994-11-18	Topics include Canine cancer detection, Learned pig, Clever hans.
20	"Into Thin Air"	1994-11-25	Topics include Crocker Land Expedition, Fata Morgana (mirage), Phantom Island, Pepys Island.
21	"Baffling Bombardments"	1994-12-02	Topics include Rain of animals, 1896 St. Louis-East St. Louis tornado, 1947 Glazier–Higgins–Woodward tornadoes.
22	"Meeting Mary: Visions of the Virgin"	1994-12-09	Topics include Miracle of the Sun, Our Lady of Fatima, Steuart Campbell, James Horan (monsignor), Moving statues, Our Lady of Medjugorje.
23	"Secrets of Ancient Worlds"	1994-12-16	Topics include Bimini Road, Edgar Cayce, Atlantis, Santorini caldera, Minoan eruption, Anthony Bonanno, Olmec colossal heads, Misraħ Għar il-Kbir
24	"Spirits of Place: Hauntings and Ghosts"	1994-12-23	Topics include Spirit photography.
25	"True or False: More Than Meets the Eye"	1994-12-30	Topics include Drake's Plate of Brass, New Albion, Herbert Eugene Bolton, Frank Asaro, Hermann Loew, Archaeopteryx, Sherbone bone.
26	"Mysteries of the North"	1995-01-06	Topics include Almas (folklore), Viking expansion, Storsjöodjuret.

== Home release ==
Arthur C. Clarke's Mysterious Universe was released on DVD on 11 March 2003.

A collection DVD Box Set of all three Arthur C. Clarke documentary series, Arthur C. Clarke's Mysterious World, Arthur C. Clarke's World of Strange Powers and Arthur C. Clarke's Mysterious Universe was released in July 2013 by Visual Entertainment, which also re-released them separately in September 2013.
