= The Ghost from the Grand Banks =

1990 novel by Arthur C. Clarke

- First edition (UK)
- Author: Arthur C. Clarke
- Cover artist: Tom Stimpson
- Language: English
- Genre: Science fiction
- Publisher: Gollancz (UK); Bantam Spectra (US)
- Publication date: 1990
- Publication place: United Kingdom
- Media type: Print (Hardcover & Paperback)
- Pages: 253
- ISBN: 0-575-04906-5
- OCLC: 23286535
- LC Class: PR6005.L36 G48 1990b

The Ghost from the Grand Banks is a 1990 science fiction novel by British writer Arthur C. Clarke.

The story deals with two groups, both of whom are attempting to raise one of the halves of the wreck of the Titanic from the floor of the Atlantic Ocean in time for the sinking's centennial in 2012.

Chapter 7 is an editorial from The Times for April 15, 2007 which urges that the Titanic be left alone: "There is no need to revisit her to be reminded of the most important lesson the Titanic can teach—the dangers of over-confidence, of technological hubris." As the plot develops, Clarke moves events through complications that echo the editorial.

The title "Ghost from the Grand Banks" was also previously used as the title of a chapter in an earlier Clarke book, Imperial Earth, which also regards a recovered Titanic.

The book also makes many references to the Mandelbrot set, inventing a mind condition called "Mandelmania" for those mentally lost in its exploration.
