= When the Twerms Came =

- Short story by Arthur C. Clarke
- Country: United States
- Language: English
- Genre: Science-fiction

Publication
- Published in: Playboy
- Publication type: Magazine
- Publication date: May 1972

"When the Twerms Came" is a short story by British author Arthur C. Clarke that was first published in Playboy magazine, alongside illustrations by Skip Williamson. It deals with an invasion of Earth one wet Tuesday afternoon by deadly Twerms. The story was first published in the May 1972 edition of Playboy and was later included in the collections The View from Serendip, The Wind from the Sun, and More Than One Universe.

== Synopsis ==
Fleeing from their mortal enemy the Mucoids, the Twerms are desperate to find a new place to live. They discover Earth and study its peoples, discovering their weak points. The Twerms choose not to focus their initial attack on centers of military power, instead choosing to send a small portion to attack a heavily populated city on a Tuesday afternoon. They unleash various weapons that cause psychedelics, severe itching, diarrhea, or tumescence onto the population, but only result in a small number of deaths, mostly heart related. The rest of the fleet attack Geneva, Basel, and Bern and learn the identities of every single owner of a Swiss bank account. The Twerms send the owners threatening letters, resulting in the successful conquering of the Earth.

== Release ==
"When the Twerms Came" was first published in the May 1972 edition of Playboy magazine, where it was accompanied by a comic strip drawn by Skip Williamson. Five years later in 1977 it was published in book form in The View from Serendip. It has subsequently been published in The Wind from the Sun and the More Than One Universe collections. The short story has been translated to French.

== Themes ==
"When the Twerms Came" deals with the theme of alien invasion, a scenario that per Gary Westfahl is not common in Clarke's works.

== Reception ==
The story has been described as "lighthearted". In an obituary for Williamson, Richard Sandomir of the New York Times described the story as a "silly, preposterous visual tableau, with one Twerm munching on a hot dog and another watching "The Mod Squad"."
