= Arthur C. Clarke's Mysterious World =

1980 British television series

- Genre: Documentary television
- Directed by: Peter Jones; Michael Weigall; Charles Flynn
- Narrated by: Gordon Honeycombe
- Country of origin: United Kingdom
- No. of series: 1
- No. of episodes: 13

Production
- Producers: John Fanshawe; John Fairley
- Running time: 25 minutes
- Production company: Yorkshire Television

Original release
- Network: ITV
- Release: 2 September – 25 November 1980

Related
- Arthur C. Clarke's World of Strange Powers; Arthur C. Clarke's Mysterious Universe

Arthur C. Clarke's Mysterious World is a thirteen-part British television series looking at unexplained phenomena from around the world. It was produced by Yorkshire Television for the ITV network and first broadcast on 6 September 1980.

Each programme is introduced and concluded by author Arthur C. Clarke in short sequences filmed in Sri Lanka. The bulk of the episodes are narrated by Gordon Honeycombe. The series was produced by John Fanshawe and John Fairley, and directed by Peter Jones, Michael Weigall and Charles Flynn. It also featured a unique soundtrack composed by British artist Alan Hawkshaw.

In 1980, Book Club Associates published a hardcover book with the same name, authored by Simon Welfare and John Fairley, where the contents of the show were further explored. It featured an introduction written by Clarke as well as his remarks at the end of each chapter or topic. In 1985, a paperback of this book was released by HarperCollins Publishers.

The series was followed by Arthur C. Clarke's World of Strange Powers in 1985 and Arthur C. Clarke's Mysterious Universe in 1994.

== Episodes ==
No.	Title	Original release date
1	"The Journey Begins..."	2 September 1980
This episode introduces the themes that are explored in the remainder of the series. Clarke expounds on his categorisation of mysteries, self-consciously aping the famous 'close encounters' categorisation used by some ufologists: 1. Mysteries of the First Kind – phenomena which were mysterious to our ancestors but are now well understood. Clarke illustrates this category by observing the Solar eclipse of 16 February 1980 from Hyderabad, India, highlighting that eclipses are still treated with reverence and suspicion in some cultures.; 2. Mysteries of the Second Kind – phenomena which are as yet unexplained, but where we have several clues that hint at an answer. Clarke looks at ball lightning (including one sighting by Roger Jennison in the cabin of an aircraft), the Loch Ness Monster, Remy Van Lierde's encounter with a gigantic snake, a sighting of a sea serpent off the coast of England, the stone spheres of Costa Rica, the Baghdad Battery, the vitrified forts of Scotland, Stonehenge, and the Cerne Abbas Giant. The ruined ancient palace of Sigiriya in Sri Lanka, which Clarke mentions at the beginning of the episode, could also be included in this category.; 3. Mysteries of the Third Kind – phenomena for which we have no rational explanation. Clarke mentions psychic phenomena as something that would be included in this category, and the extremely strange phenomena of raining animals and seeds and nuts "raining" from the sky might also be included.
2	"Monsters of the Deep"	9 September 1980
Including the giant squid, gigantic octopus, sea serpent and megamouth shark
3	"Ancient Wisdom"	16 September 1980
This show is concerned with technology from history that was either ahead of its time and subsequently forgotten, or artefacts which are mysteries in themselves. This includes the Baghdad Battery, where German scientist Arne Eggebrecht is shown electroplating a small silver statue with a gold cyanide solution and a replica of the battery using grape juice. There are also segments on the Antikythera Mechanism (including an interview with Derek J. de Solla Price), the Stone Balls of Costa Rica and the so-called 'Skull of Doom' which dominates the opening credits of the series. Also included are the vitrified stone forts of Scotland including Tap o' Noth near Aberdeen. Clarke opines at the end that had some of these forgotten technologies been developed and not lost that it would now be like it was the year 4000 AD and that we would have already 'colonised the stars'.
4	"The Missing Apeman"	23 September 1980
This episode is divided equally between considering evidence for the Bigfoot and Yeti. Interviewees for the segment on the Yeti include Don Whillans, Lord Hunt and Eric Shipton. Lengthy consideration is given to the Patterson–Gimlin film, and interviewees include Grover Krantz – who demonstrates several casts of alleged Bigfoot tracks that he feels bolsters his belief that the creature represents a relative of Gigantopithecus. Clarke concludes that, although Russian scientists who studied the Patterson–Gimlin film declared the stride to be 'quite inhuman', special effects used in the 1968 film 2001: A Space Odyssey showed that it is possible to create very convincing ape-men. He also notes that it would be very difficult for a creature such as Bigfoot to remain undetected in North America.
5	"Giants for the Gods"	30 September 1980
About the Cerne Abbas giant, Nazca lines and others
6	"Monsters of the Lakes"	7 October 1980
Including Nessie, Ogopogo
7	"The Great Siberian Explosion"	14 October 1980
This episode investigated the cause of the Tunguska event. The programme concluded that the explosion was caused by the impact of a comet fragment, or other ice-rich body, that exploded above the ground. The reasons given for this were the fact that there was no crater as might be expected had a stony or iron object been involved and the heightened levels of rare earth elements discovered in the devastated environment afterwards.
8	"The Riddle of the Stones"	21 October 1980
Newgrange and other megalithic structures, such as Stonehenge and Avebury
9	"Out of the Blue"	28 October 1980
Discussing ice falls, frog falls, raining animals, etc.
10	"U.F.O.s"	4 November 1980
Including the Robert Taylor incident and an interview with Kenneth Arnold
11	"Dragons, Dinosaurs and Giant Snakes"	11 November 1980
Including Mokele-mbembe, giant anaconda, Ameranthropoides loysi as well as sightings and excavations of animals such as the moa and the woolly mammoth. Also interviews with Roy Mackal and James Powell.
12	"Strange Skies"	18 November 1980
Including lost planets such as Vulcan, the Martian canals, the identity of the Star of Bethlehem etc.
13	"Clarke's Cabinet of Curiosities"	25 November 1980
A collection of unrelated subjects and a summing-up – including the sailing stones of Death Valley, the alma, entombed toads, ball lightning in which physicist James Tuck appears, and a summing-up.

== Home release ==
In January 2008 the original series was released on DVD in the UK by Network and Granada. It features all of the 13 original episodes unedited and remastered.

A collection DVD Box Set of all three Arthur C. Clarke documentary series, Arthur C. Clarke's Mysterious World, Arthur C. Clarke's World of Strange Powers and Arthur C. Clarke's Mysterious Universe was released in July 2013 by Visual Entertainment, which also re-released them separately in September 2013.

== See also ==
- In Search of... – a similar U.S. television show hosted by Leonard Nimoy beginning in the late 1970s
