= Arthur C. Clarke's World of Strange Powers =

1985 British television series

- Genre: Documentary television
- Directed by: Peter Jones; Michael Weigall; Charles Flynn
- Narrated by: Anna Ford
- Country of origin: United Kingdom
- No. of seasons: 1
- No. of episodes: 13

Production
- Producer: John Fairley
- Running time: 25 minutes
- Production company: Yorkshire Television

Original release
- Network: ITV
- Release: 3 April – 10 July 1985

Related
- Arthur C. Clarke's Mysterious World; Arthur C. Clarke's Mysterious Universe

Arthur C. Clarke's World of Strange Powers is a thirteen-part British television series looking at strange worlds of the paranormal. It was produced by Yorkshire Television for the ITV network and first broadcast in 1985. It was the sequel to the 1980 series Arthur C. Clarke's Mysterious World.

The series is introduced by science fiction writer Arthur C. Clarke in short sequences filmed at his home in Sri Lanka. Individual episodes are narrated by Anna Ford. The series was produced by John Fairley and directed by Peter Jones, Michael Weigall and Charles Flynn.

In 1984, G.P. Putnam's Sons published a hardcover book with the same name, authored by Simon Welfare and John Fairley, where the contents of the show were further explored. It featured an introduction written by Clarke as well as his remarks at the end of each chapter or topic. In 1985, a paperback of this book was released by HarperCollins Publishers.

The series was followed by Arthur C. Clarke's Mysterious Universe, broadcast in 1994.

== Episodes ==
No.	Title	Original release date
1	"Warnings from the Future?"	3 April 1985
2	"Things That Go Bump in the Night"	10 April 1985
3	""From Mind to Mind""	17 April 1985
4	"Stigmata – The Wounds of Christ?"	24 April 1985
5	"Ghosts, Apparitions and Haunted Houses"	1 May 1985
6	""Have We Lived Before?""	15 May 1985
7	"Fairies, Phantoms and Fantastic Photographs"	22 May 1985
8	"An Element of the Divine"	5 June 1985
9	"Walking on Fire"	12 June 1985
10	"Messages from the Dead?"	19 June 1985
11	"'The Roots of Evil'"	26 June 1985
12	"Metal-Bending, Magic and Mind Over Matter"	3 July 1985
13	"Strange Powers: The Verdict"	10 July 1985

== Home release ==
A collection DVD Box Set of all three Arthur C. Clarke documentary series, Arthur C. Clarke's Mysterious World, Arthur C. Clarke's World of Strange Powers and Arthur C. Clarke's Mysterious Universe was released in July 2013 by Visual Entertainment, which also re-released them separately in September 2013.
