= Glide Path =

1963 war novel by Arthur C. Clarke

- First edition
- Author: Arthur C. Clarke
- Language: English
- Publisher: Harcourt Brace
- Publication date: 1963
- Publication place: United Kingdom
- Media type: Print (Hardback & Paperback)
- Pages: 229 pp

Glide Path is a novel by the English writer Arthur C. Clarke, published in 1963. Clarke's only non-science fiction novel, it is set during World War II and relates a fictionalized version of the development of the radar-based ground-controlled approach (called "ground-controlled descent" in the novel) aircraft landing system, and includes a character modeled on Luis Alvarez, who developed this system. It is based on Clarke's own wartime service with the Royal Air Force, during which he worked on the GCA project.
