= Visual Entertainment Inc. =

Canadian video business

Visual Entertainment Inc. (VEI)
- Company type: Private
- Industry: Home video
- Founded: 2005
- Headquarters: Toronto, Ontario, Canada
- Products: DVD, Blu-ray
- Website: www.visualentertainment.tv

Visual Entertainment Inc. (VEI) is a home video/television distribution company that is based in Toronto, Ontario. An independent label, it has released several well-known TV series on DVD, some through sub-licensing deals with other labels such as Universal Pictures Home Entertainment and CBS Home Entertainment.

In 2014, Phase 4 Films became VEI's new American distributor.

== Releases ==
=== Children ===
- The Adventures Of Cheburashka And Friends
- Adventures of Mowgli
- Around the World in 80 Days
- Arthur and the Square Knights of the Round Table
- The Big Adventure Series
- Dinky Dog
- Drak Pack
- Earthworm Jim
- Gordon the Garden Gnome
- The Secret World Of Og
- Wing Commander Academy

=== Documentaries ===
- Crime Inc.
- Our Own Private Bin Laden
- Arthur C. Clarke's Mysterious World
- Arthur C. Clarke's World of Strange Powers
- Arthur C. Clarke's Mysterious Universe
- In Search of...

=== Reality shows ===
- Airline
- The Amazing Kreskin
- Cheaters
- Hell's Kitchen (American TV series)
- Ramsay's Kitchen Nightmares

=== TV Series ===
- 21 Jump Street
- Angie
- The Bad News Bears
- Barnaby Jones
- Baywatch
- Bizarre
- Cagney & Lacey
- Cannon
- Cobra
- Dan August
- Deadly Games
- Desmond's
- Diagnosis: Murder
- The Division
- Early Edition
- The Equalizer
- Evening Shade
- Galavant
- Gimme a Break!
- Grace Under Fire
- The Greatest American Hero
- Hardcastle and McCormick
- Hawkeye
- Highlander: The Series
- Highway to Heaven
- Hotel
- Hunter
- The Immortal (1970 TV series)
- In Search of...
- The Invisible Man
- Jake and the Fatman
- Jake 2.0
- Kate & Allie
- Level 9
- Longstreet
- The Magician
- Martial Law
- Matt Houston
- McCloud
- McMillan & Wife
- Mind Your Language
- The Mod Squad
- Nash Bridges
- Nero Wolfe
- On The Buses
- Only When I Laugh
- The Parkers
- The Persuaders!
- Petrocelli
- Poltergeist: The Legacy
- The Powers of Matthew Star
- Promised Land
- The Protectors
- Renegade
- Return to Eden
- Riptide
- The Ropers
- The Sentinel
- Seven Days
- Silk Stalkings
- Sister Sister
- The Smith Family
- The Snoop Sisters
- Sordid Lives: The Series
- Stargate SG1
- Stargate Atlantis
- Stargate Universe
- Special Unit 2
- Stingray
- The Stockard Channing Show
- Street Justice
- Super Force
- Teen Wolf
- That's My Boy
- Three's a Crowd
- Three's Company
- Too Close for Comfort
- The Trials of Rosie O'Neill
- Twice in a Lifetime
- The Untouchables
- Viper
- Wiseguy
