= How the World Was One =

1992 English-language book by Arthur C. Clarke

How the World Was One: Beyond the Global Village i
- First edition
- Author: Arthur C. Clarke
- Language: English
- Genre: Non-fiction
- Publisher: Gollancz
- Publication date: 1992

How the World Was One: Beyond the Global Village is Arthur C. Clarke's history and survey of the communications revolution, published in 1992. The title includes an intentional pun; in English How the World Was Won would sound exactly the same. The title also references the title of the blockbuster 1962 film How the West Was Won.

This work is based on an earlier work by Clarke entitled Voice Across the Sea, published in 1958.
