= 1984: Spring / A Choice of Futures =

1984 book by Arthur C. Clarke

First edition (publ. Del Rey Books) Cover photo: William Coupon

1984: Spring / A Choice of Futures is a book by Arthur C. Clarke published in 1984.

== Plot summary ==
1984: Spring / A Choice of Futures is a book consisting of 31 non-fiction pieces.

== Reception ==
Dave Langford reviewed 1984: Spring / A Choice of Futures for White Dwarf #68, and stated that "Plenty of good things here: too many, really, as Clarke reprints several speeches which make points in the same words. Where was his editor?"

Krzysztof Sokołowski reviewed the book for Polish magazine Fantastyka (1/87, p. 59)

== Reviews ==
- Review by Dan Chow (1984) in Locus, #277 February 1984
- Review by Robert Coulson (1984) in Amazing Stories, July 1984
- Review by Richard D. Erlich (1984) in Fantasy Review, July 1984
- Review by Tom Easton (1984) in Analog Science Fiction/Science Fact, September 1984
