= Astounding Days: A Science Fictional Autobiography =

Autobiography of Arthur C. Clarke

- Author: Arthur Charles Clarke
- Publication date: 1989
- ISBN: 9780575044463

Astounding Days: A Science Fictional Autobiography is a memoir written by Arthur C. Clarke in 1989. It was first published that year by Victor Gollancz Ltd. in London, England. Bantam Books published a paperback edition in New York City in 1990.

== Contents ==
In the book, Clarke recounts his childhood in rural England spent reading issues of the American science fiction pulp magazine Astounding Stories of Super-Science (currently published as Analog), his early adulthood in London participating in activities (and serving as treasurer) of the British Interplanetary Society, and his later years in Sri Lanka and elsewhere. The book is divided into five sections, the first four organized around the tenure of each of Astounding's first three editors and the more recent publications of Analog. The final section is an appendix containing an index of Clarke's stories, letters and articles published in Astounding and Analog between 1938 and 1987.Clarkee recalls events of his own life interspersed with reviews of various stories published in the magazine and discussions of its first three editors, Harry Bates, F. Orlin Tremaine and John W. Campbell, Jr., and the contributing authors. He also offers detailed explanations of various scientific principles and advances as they applied to both the stories and his own experience as a World War II Royal Air Force military radar operator, and later as an author, explorer and scientist. Reminiscences of various well-known figures of his personal acquaintance are also featured, including Isaac Asimov, Willy Ley, Wernher von Braun, and Stanley Kubrick.

== Reception ==
A review from Kirkus described the stories as "charming" and "effortlessly informative", but criticised them as varying in quality, with some considered to be "less successful". The review also critiqued that occasionally "fiction outpaced fact". The Encyclopedia of Science Fiction also stated that the book "consists of enjoyable reminiscences of his own literary life, with a good amount of material on other writers". Mary Grace Butler, in The New York Times, stated that the descriptions of scientific fiction was "chatty" and "anecdotal".
