= Heinlein Centennial =

2007 event celebrating Robert A. Heinlein

The Heinlein Centennial Convention was held in Kansas City from July 6 through July 8, 2007, coincident with the 100th anniversary of Robert A. Heinlein's birth in Butler, Missouri on July 7, 1907. The guests of honor were Robert and Virginia Heinlein, in absentia and deceased. The keynote speakers were:

- Michael D. Griffin, administrator of NASA
- Brian Binnie, pilot of SpaceShipOne on its X-Prize-winning flight
- Peter Diamandis, founder of the X-Prize
- Jeff Greason, CEO of XCOR Aerospace
- Patricia G. Smith, Associate Administrator for Commercial Space Transportation within the Federal Aviation Administration

Many notable science fiction authors were also in attendance, including Spider and Jeanne Robinson, David Gerrold, Frederik Pohl, and John Scalzi.

The event was held in the adjoining Crown Center Hyatt Regency and Westin hotels, which are linked by a Habitrail-like transparent pedestrian tube called "The Link".

== Programming notes ==
The program included a track devoted to space travel with emphasis on commercial endeavors, since Heinlein is revered by many in the private space community, notably for his book The Man Who Sold the Moon.

Some programming began on the evening of July 5 with selections of Heinlein's biography read by his official biographer, William Patterson.

Saturday evening featured a gala of entertainment including a rare video greeting from Sir Arthur C. Clarke in Sri Lanka, one of the last he recorded before his death the following year.

The centennial also hosted two ongoing conferences at the same venue: The annual Campbell Conference and the Science Fiction Research Association Conference, where both presented their awards. The winners of the awards were brought to Kansas City and were honored in a joint evening event on Friday evening.

The Campbell Conference topic for Saturday's round-table discussion was, "Robert A. Heinlein, Jack Williamson, and 21st Century Science Fiction."
