= Interplanetary Flight: An Introduction to Astronautics =

1950 book by Arthur C. Clarke

- First edition
- Author: Arthur C. Clarke
- Language: English
- Publication date: 1950
- Publication place: United Kingdom

Interplanetary Flight: An Introduction to Astronautics is a short, modestly technical introduction to space exploration written by Arthur C. Clarke, and published in 1950. It includes material accessible to readers with a high-school level of science and technical education, covering the elements of orbital mechanics, rocket design and performance, various applications of Earth satellites, a discussion of the more interesting and accessible destinations in the Solar System (such as they were understood at the time of writing), and in a final chapter covering the rationale and value of human expansion off the Earth.

== Overview ==
The book includes ten chapters:

- Historical Survey
- The Earth's Gravitational Field
- The Rocket
- The Problem of Escape by Rocket
- The Earth-Moon Journey
- Interplanetary Flight
- The Atomic Rocket
- Spaceships and Space Stations
- Subsidiary Problems
- Opening Frontiers

A short mathematical appendix is provided (for the benefit of readers not versed in the calculus), plus a bibliography and index, for a total of 164 pages. It includes also many figures and diagrams, and 15 plates (now largely of historical interest, showing how far space exploration has advanced since 1950).
