= Luis Walter Alvarez =

American physicist, inventor and professor (1911–1988)

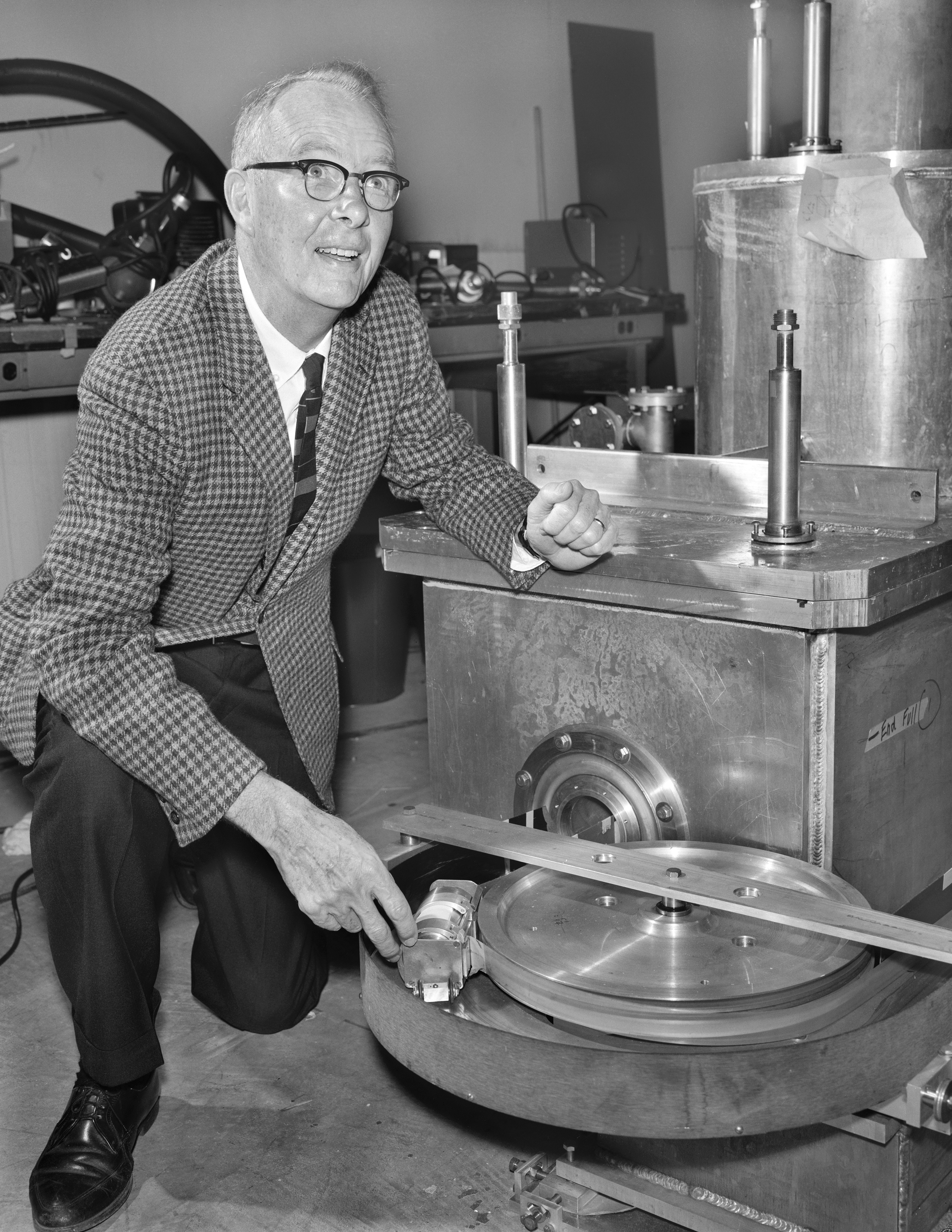
- Alvarez with a magnetic monopole detector in 1969
- Born: June 13, 1911; San Francisco, California, U.S.
- Died: September 1, 1988 (aged 77); Berkeley, California, U.S.
- Education: University of Chicago (BS, MS, PhD)
- Known for: Accelerator mass spectrometry, Alvarez hypothesis, AN/CPS-1, Electron capture, Exploding-bridgewire detonator, Ground-controlled approach, Linear particle accelerator, Liquid hydrogen bubble chamber, Muon-catalyzed fusion, Muon tomography, Isolation of Helium-3, Isolation of tritium, Measurement of neutron magnetic moment
- Spouses: Geraldine Smithwick (m. 1936; div. 1957) Janet L. Landis (m. 1958)
- Children: 4, including Walter Alvarez
- Father: Walter C. Alvarez
- Awards: Collier Trophy (1945); Medal for Merit (1947); John Scott Medal (1953); Albert Einstein Award (1961); National Medal of Science (1963); Pioneer Award (1963); Michelson–Morley Award (1965); Nobel Prize in Physics (1968); Enrico Fermi Award (1987)
- Scientific career
- Fields: Physics
- Workplaces: University of California, Berkeley
- Doctoral advisor: Arthur Compton

Signature
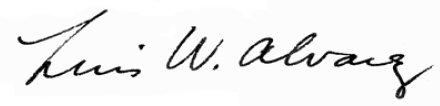

Luis Walter Alvarez (June 13, 1911 – September 1, 1988) was an American experimental physicist, inventor, and professor who was awarded the Nobel Prize in Physics in 1968 for his discovery of resonance states in particle physics using the hydrogen bubble chamber. In 2007 the American Journal of Physics commented, "Luis Alvarez was one of the most brilliant and productive experimental physicists of the twentieth century."

After receiving his PhD from the University of Chicago in 1936, Alvarez went to work for Ernest Lawrence at the Radiation Laboratory at the University of California, Berkeley. Alvarez devised a set of experiments to observe K-electron capture in radioactive nuclei, predicted by the beta decay theory but never before observed. He produced tritium using the cyclotron and measured its lifetime. In collaboration with Felix Bloch, he measured the magnetic moment of the neutron.

In 1940, Alvarez joined the MIT Radiation Laboratory, where he contributed to a number of World War II radar projects, from early improvements to Identification friend or foe (IFF) radar beacons, now called transponders, to a system known as VIXEN for preventing enemy submarines from realizing that they had been found by the new airborne microwave radars. The radar system for which Alvarez is best known and which has played a major role in aviation, most particularly in the post war Berlin airlift, was Ground Controlled Approach (GCA). Alvarez spent a few months at the University of Chicago working on nuclear reactors for Enrico Fermi before coming to Los Alamos to work for Robert Oppenheimer on the Manhattan Project. Alvarez worked on the design of explosive lenses, and the development of exploding-bridgewire detonators. As a member of Project Alberta, he observed the Trinity nuclear test from a B-29 Superfortress, and later the bombing of Hiroshima from the B-29 The Great Artiste.

After the war Alvarez was involved in the design of a liquid hydrogen bubble chamber that allowed his team to take millions of photographs of particle interactions, develop complex computer systems to measure and analyze these interactions, and discover entire families of new particles and resonance states. This work resulted in his being awarded the Nobel Prize in 1968. He was involved in a project to x-ray the Egyptian pyramids to search for unknown chambers. With his son, geologist Walter Alvarez, he developed the Alvarez hypothesis which proposes that the extinction event that wiped out the non-avian dinosaurs was the result of an asteroid impact.

== Early life ==
Luis Walter Alvarez was born into a Catholic family in San Francisco on June 13, 1911, the second child and oldest son of Walter C. Alvarez, a physician, and his wife Harriet (née Smyth). His grandfather, Luis F. Álvarez, was a physician born in Asturias, Spain, who lived briefly in Cuba, settled in the United States, and discovered a better method for diagnosing macular leprosy. He had an older sister, Gladys, a younger brother, Bob, and a younger sister, Bernice. His aunt, Mabel Alvarez, was a California artist specializing in oil painting.

He attended Madison School in San Francisco from 1918 to 1924, and then San Francisco Polytechnic High School. In 1926, his father became a researcher at the Mayo Clinic, and the family moved to Rochester, Minnesota, where Alvarez attended Rochester High School. He had always expected to attend the University of California, Berkeley, but at the urging of his teachers at Rochester, he instead went to the University of Chicago, where he received his bachelor's degree in 1932, his master's degree in 1934, and his PhD in 1936. As an undergraduate, he belonged to the Phi Gamma Delta fraternity. As a postgraduate he moved to Gamma Alpha.

In 1932, as a graduate student at Chicago, he discovered the field of physics and had the rare opportunity to use the equipment of legendary physicist Albert A. Michelson. Alvarez also constructed an apparatus of Geiger counter tubes arranged as a cosmic ray telescope, and under the aegis of his faculty advisor Arthur Compton, conducted an experiment in Mexico City to measure the so-called East–West effect of cosmic rays. Observing more incoming radiation from the west, Alvarez concluded that primary cosmic rays were positively charged. Compton submitted the resulting paper to the Physical Review, with Alvarez's name at the top.

Alvarez was an agnostic even though his father had been a deacon in a Congregational church.

== Early work ==
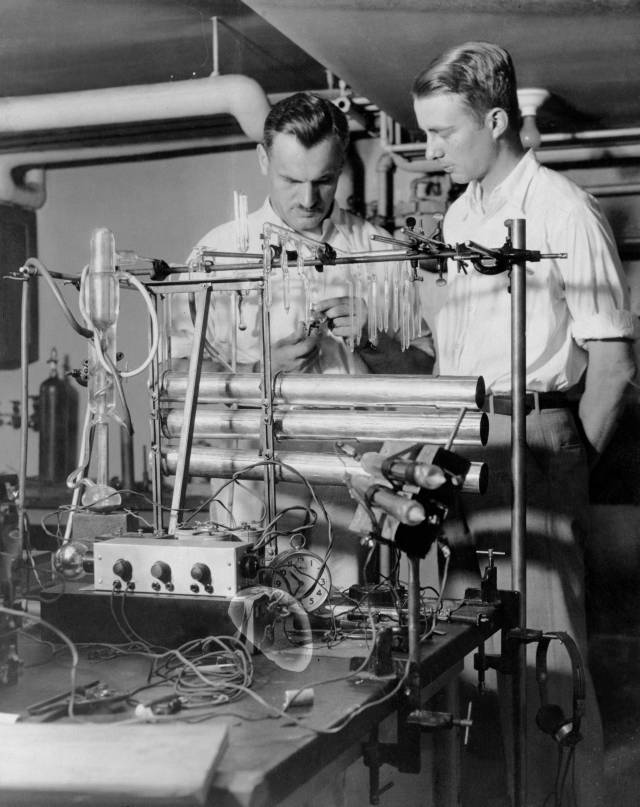
Nobel Laureate Arthur Compton, left, with young graduate student Luis Alvarez at the University of Chicago in 1933. Compton served as his doctoral adviser.

Alvarez's sister, Gladys, worked for Berkeley physicist Ernest Lawrence as a part-time secretary, and mentioned Alvarez to Lawrence. Lawrence then invited Alvarez to tour the Century of Progress exhibition in Chicago with him. After he completed his oral exams in 1936, Alvarez, now engaged to be married to Geraldine Smithwick, asked his sister to see if Lawrence had any jobs available at the Radiation Laboratory. A telegram soon arrived from Gladys with a job offer from Lawrence. This started a long association with the University of California, Berkeley. Alvarez and Smithwick were married in one of the chapels at the University of Chicago and then headed for California. They had two children, Walter and Jean. They were divorced in 1957. On December 28, 1958, he married Janet L. Landis, and had two more children, Donald and Helen.

At the Radiation Laboratory he worked with Lawrence's experimental team, which was supported by a group of theoretical physicists headed by Robert Oppenheimer. Alvarez devised a set of experiments to observe K-electron capture in radioactive nuclei, predicted by the beta decay theory but never observed. Using magnets to sweep aside the positrons and electrons emanating from his radioactive sources, he designed a special purpose Geiger counter to detect only the "soft" X-rays coming from K capture. He published his results in the Physical Review in 1937.

When deuterium (hydrogen-2) is bombarded with deuterium, the fusion reaction yields either tritium (hydrogen-3) plus a proton or helium-3 plus a neutron (^{2}H + ^{2}H → ^{3}H + p or ^{3}He + n). This is one of the most basic fusion reactions, and the foundation of both the thermonuclear weapon and the current research on controlled nuclear fusion. At that time the stability of these two reaction products was unknown, but based on existing theories Hans Bethe thought that tritium would be stable and helium-3 unstable. Alvarez proved the reverse by using his knowledge of the details of the 60-inch cyclotron operation. He tuned the machine to accelerate doubly ionized helium-3 nuclei and was able to get a beam of accelerated ions, thus using the cyclotron as a kind of super mass spectrometer. As the accelerated helium came from deep gas wells where it had been for millions of years, the helium-3 component had to be stable. Afterwards Alvarez produced the radioactive tritium using the cyclotron and the ^{2}H + ^{2}H reaction and measured its lifetime.

In 1938, again using his knowledge of the cyclotron and inventing what are now known as time-of-flight techniques, Alvarez created a mono-energetic beam of thermal neutrons. With this he began a long series of experiments, collaborating with Felix Bloch, to measure the magnetic moment of the neutron. Their result of μ_{0} = 1.93±0.02 μ_{N}, published in 1940, was a major advance over earlier work.

== World War II ==
=== Radiation Laboratory ===
The British Tizard Mission to the United States in 1940 demonstrated to leading American scientists the successful application of the cavity magnetron to produce short wavelength pulsed radar. The National Defense Research Committee, established only months earlier by President Franklin Roosevelt, created a central national laboratory at the Massachusetts Institute of Technology (MIT) for the purpose of developing military applications of microwave radar. Lawrence immediately recruited his best "cyclotroneers", among them Alvarez, who joined this new laboratory, known as the Radiation Laboratory, on November 11, 1940. Alvarez contributed to a number of radar projects, from early improvements to Identification Friend or Foe (IFF) radar beacons, now called transponders, to a system known as VIXEN for preventing enemy submarines from realizing that they had been found by the new airborne microwave radars. Enemy submarines would wait until the radar signal was getting strong and then submerge, escaping attack. But VIXEN transmitted a radar signal whose strength was the cube of the distance to the submarine so that as they approached the sub, the signal—as measured by the sub—got progressively weaker, and the sub assumed the plane was getting farther away and did not submerge.

One of the first projects was to build equipment to transition from the British long-wave radar to the new microwave centimeter-band radar made possible by the cavity magnetron. In working on the Microwave Early Warning system (MEW), Alvarez invented a linear dipole array antenna that not only suppressed the unwanted side lobes of the radiation field but also could be electronically scanned without the need for mechanical scanning. This was the first microwave phased-array antenna, and Alvarez used it not only in MEW but in two additional radar systems. The antenna enabled the Eagle precision bombing radar to support precision bombing in bad weather or through clouds. It was completed rather late in the war; although a number of B-29s were equipped with Eagle and it worked well, it came too late to make much difference.

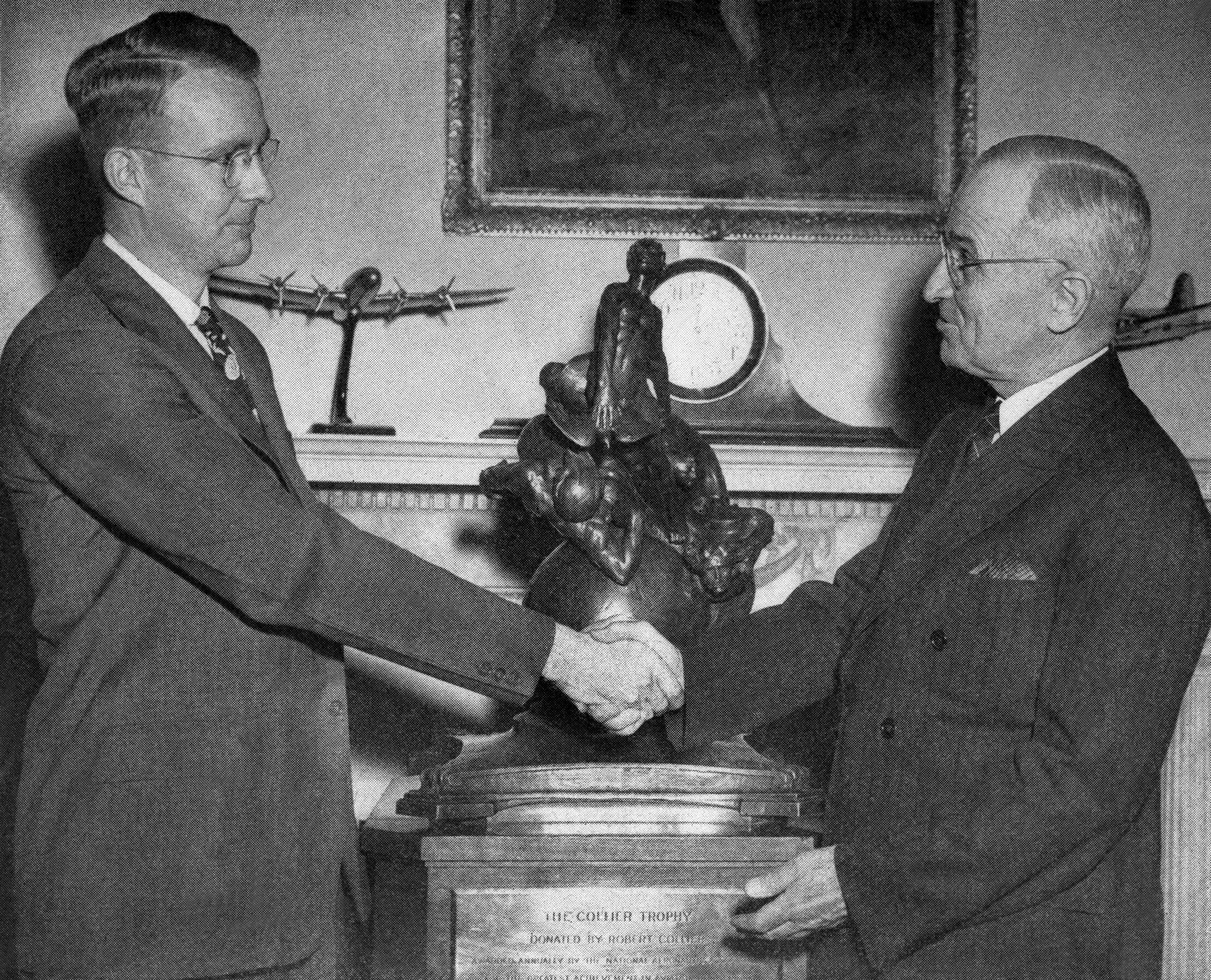
Receiving the Collier Trophy from President Harry Truman, White House, 1946

The radar system for which Alvarez is best known and which has played a major role in aviation, most particularly in the post-war Berlin airlift, was Ground Controlled Approach (GCA). Using Alvarez's dipole antenna to achieve a very high angular resolution, GCA allows ground-based radar operators to watch special precision displays to guide a landing airplane to the runway by transmitting verbal commands to the pilot. The system was simple, direct, and worked well, even with previously untrained pilots. It was so successful that the military continued to use it for many years after the war, and it was still in use in some countries in the 1980s. Alvarez was awarded the National Aeronautic Association's Collier Trophy in 1945 "for his conspicuous and outstanding initiative in the concept and development of the Ground Control Approach system for safe landing of aircraft under all weather and traffic conditions".

Alvarez spent the summer of 1943 in England testing GCA, landing planes returning from battle in bad weather, and also training the British in the use of the system. While there he encountered the young Arthur C. Clarke, who was an RAF radar technician. Clarke subsequently used his experiences at the radar research station as the basis for his novel Glide Path, which contains a thinly disguised version of Alvarez. Clarke and Alvarez developed a long-term friendship.

=== Manhattan Project ===
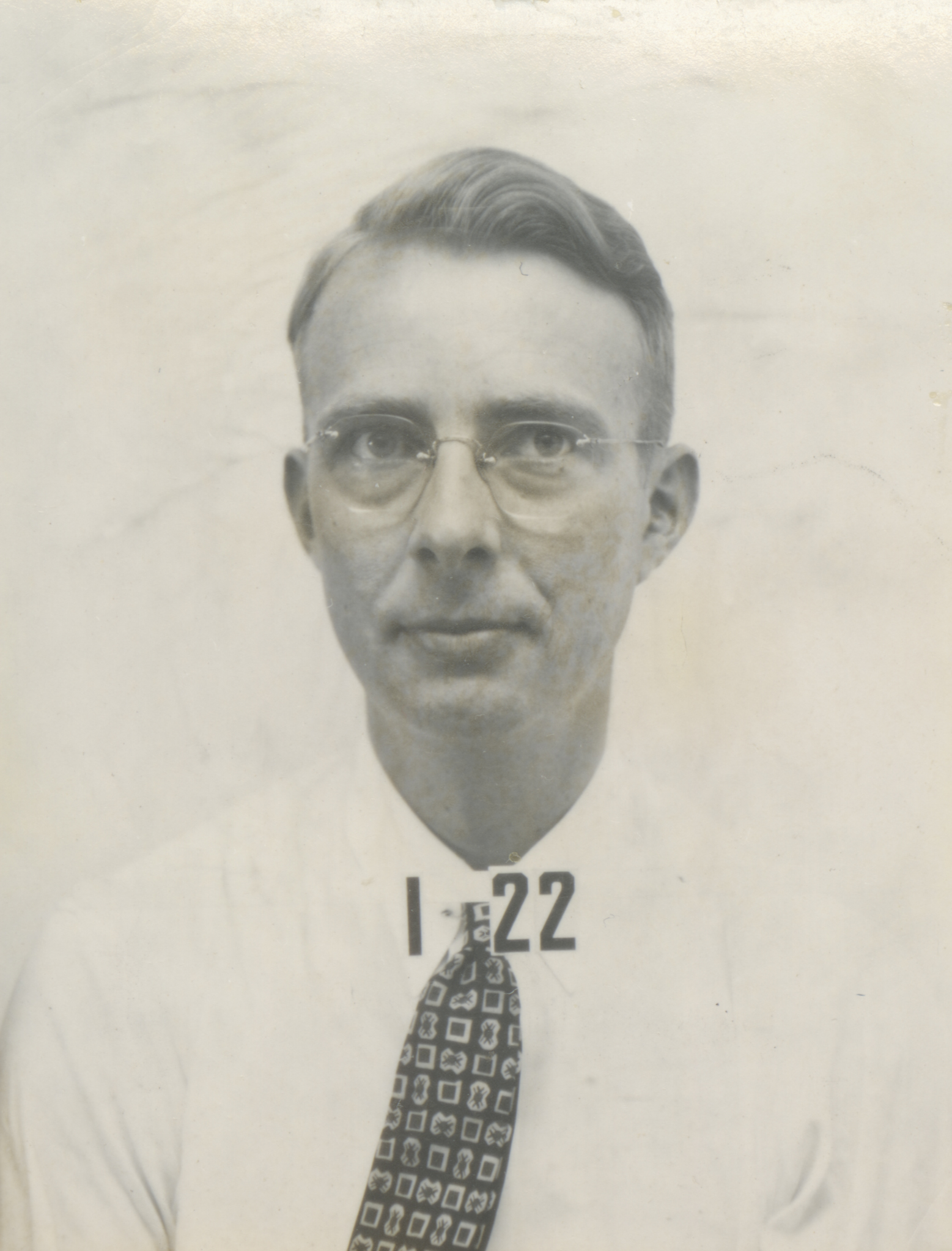
Los Alamos badge photo

In the fall of 1943, Alvarez returned to the United States with an offer from Robert Oppenheimer to work at Los Alamos on the Manhattan Project. However, Oppenheimer suggested that he first spend a few months at the University of Chicago working with Enrico Fermi before coming to Los Alamos. During these months, General Leslie Groves asked Alvarez to think of a way that the US could find out if the Germans were operating any nuclear reactors, and, if so, where they were. Alvarez suggested that an airplane could carry a system to detect the radioactive gases that a reactor produces, particularly xenon-133. The equipment did fly over Germany, but detected no radioactive xenon because the Germans had not built a reactor capable of a chain reaction. This was the first idea of monitoring fission products for intelligence gathering. It would become extremely important after the war.

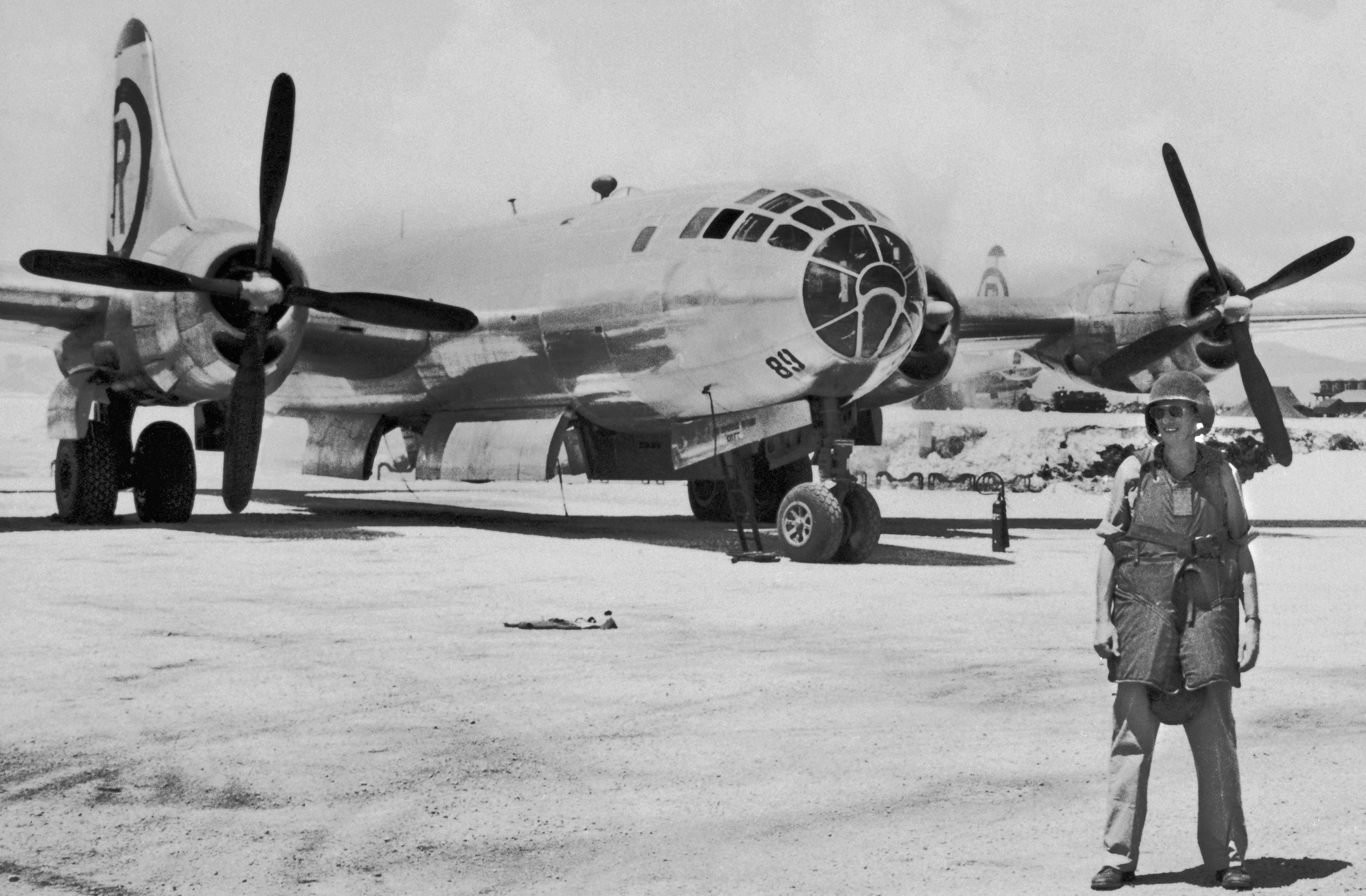
Wearing a helmet and flak jacket and standing in front of the bomber, The Great Artiste, Tinian island in 1945

As a result of his radar work and the few months spent with Fermi, Alvarez arrived at Los Alamos in the spring of 1944, later than many of his contemporaries. The work on the "Little Boy" (a uranium bomb) was far along so Alvarez became involved in the design of the "Fat Man" (a plutonium bomb). The technique used for uranium, that of forcing the two sub-critical masses together using a type of gun, would not work with plutonium because the high level of background spontaneous neutrons would cause fissions as soon as the two parts approached each other, so heat and expansion would force the system apart before much energy has been released. It was decided to use a nearly critical sphere of plutonium and compress it quickly by explosives into a much smaller and denser core, a technical challenge at the time.

To create the symmetrical implosion required to compress the plutonium core to the required density, thirty-two explosive charges were to be simultaneously detonated around the spherical core. Using conventional explosive techniques with blasting caps, progress towards achieving simultaneity to within a small fraction of a microsecond was discouraging. Alvarez directed his graduate student, Lawrence H. Johnston, to use a large capacitor to deliver a high voltage charge directly to each explosive lens, replacing blasting caps with exploding-bridgewire detonators. The exploding wire detonated the thirty-two charges to within a few tenths of a microsecond. The invention was critical to the success of the implosion-type nuclear weapon. He also supervised the RaLa Experiments. Alvarez later wrote that:

With modern weapons-grade uranium, the background neutron rate is so low that terrorists, if they had such material, would have a good chance of setting off a high-yield explosion simply by dropping one half of the material onto the other half. Most people seem unaware that if separated U-235 is at hand, it's a trivial job to set off a nuclear explosion, whereas if only plutonium is available, making it explode is the most difficult technical job I know.

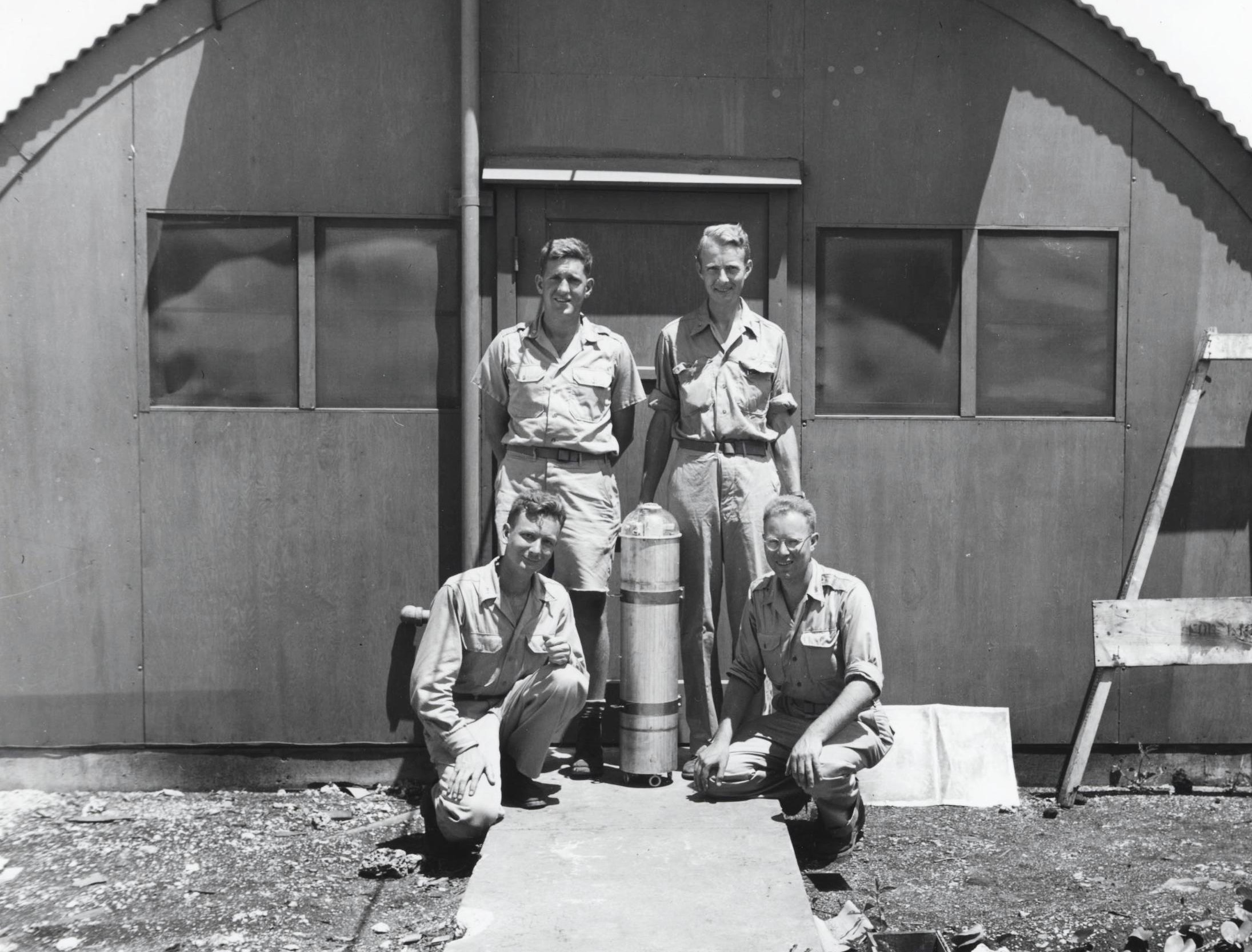
Alvarez (top right) on Tinian island with Harold Agnew (top left), Lawrence H. Johnston (bottom left) and Bernard Waldman (bottom right)

Again working with Johnston, Alvarez's last task for the Manhattan Project was to develop a set of calibrated microphone/transmitters to be parachuted from an aircraft to measure the strength of the blast wave from the atomic explosion, so as to allow the scientists to calculate the bomb's energy. After being commissioned as a lieutenant colonel in the United States Army, he observed the Trinity nuclear test from a B-29 Superfortress that also carried fellow Project Alberta members Harold Agnew and Deak Parsons (who were respectively commissioned at the rank of captain).

Flying in the B-29 Superfortress The Great Artiste in formation with the Enola Gay, Alvarez and Johnston measured the blast effect of the Little Boy bomb which was dropped on Hiroshima. A few days later, again flying in The Great Artiste, Johnston used the same equipment to measure the strength of the Nagasaki explosion.

Following the conclusion of the Second World War in 1945 Alvarez would become a professor of physics at the school he had originally desired to attend, the University of California, Berkeley and in 1978 he would be granted the title of professor emeritus.

== Bubble chamber ==
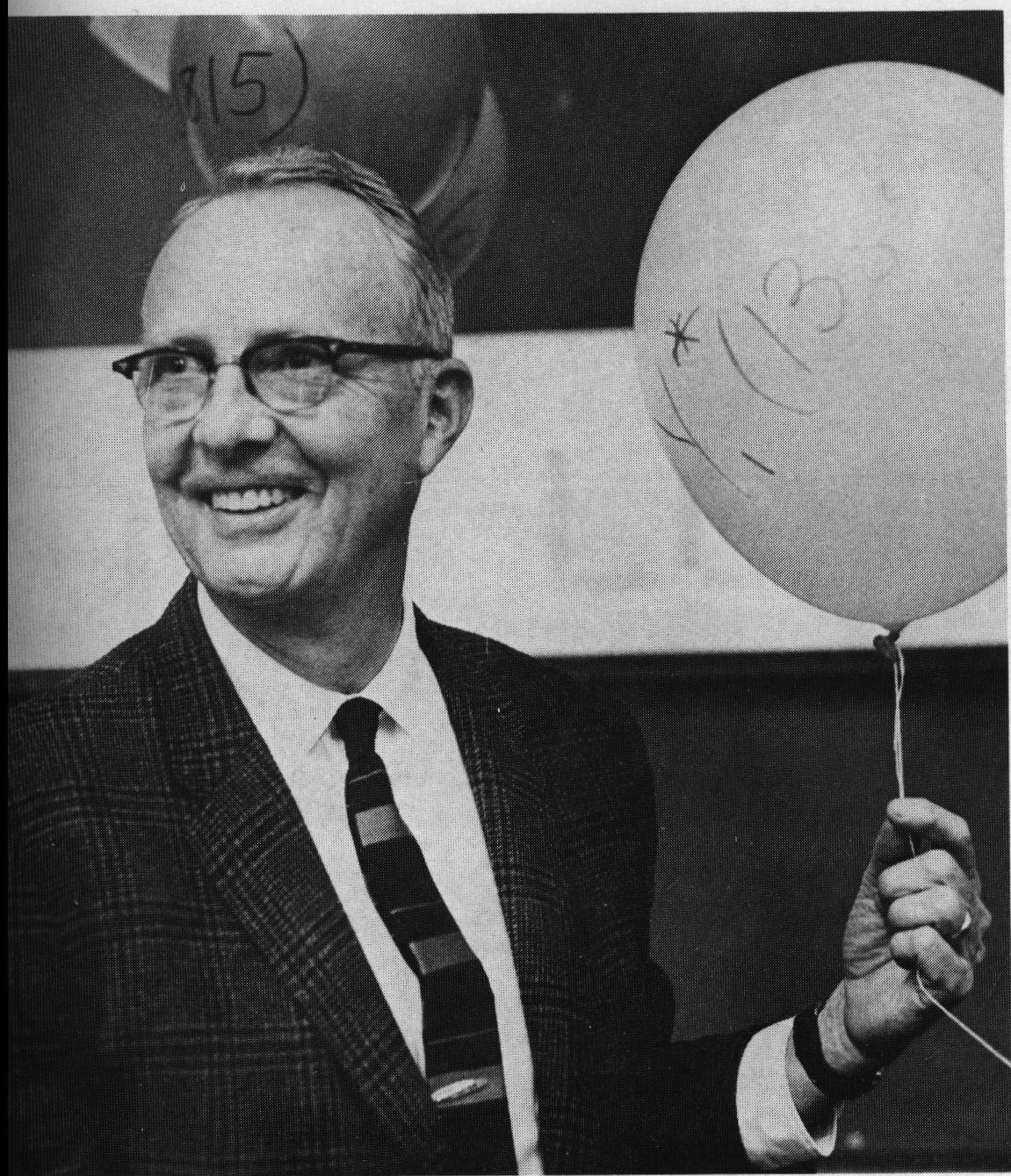
Celebrating winning the Nobel Prize, October 30, 1968. The balloons are inscribed with the names of subatomic particles that his group discovered.

Returning to the University of California, Berkeley as a full professor, Alvarez had many ideas about how to use his wartime radar knowledge to improve particle accelerators. Though some of these were to bear fruit, the "big idea" of this time would come from Edwin McMillan with his concept of phase stability which led to the synchrocyclotron. Refining and extending this concept, the Lawrence team would build the world's then-largest proton accelerator, the Bevatron, which began operating in 1954. Though the Bevatron could produce copious amounts of interesting particles, particularly in secondary collisions, these complex interactions were hard to detect and analyze at the time.

Seizing upon a new development to visualize particle tracks, created by Donald Glaser and known as a bubble chamber, Alvarez realized the device was just what was needed, if only it could be made to function with liquid hydrogen. Hydrogen nuclei, which are protons, made the simplest and most desirable target for interactions with the particles produced by the Bevatron. He began a development program to build a series of small chambers, and championed the device to Ernest Lawrence.

The Glaser device was a small glass cylinder (1 cm × 2 cm) filled with ether. By suddenly reducing the pressure in the device, the liquid could be placed into a temporary superheated state, which would boil along the disturbed track of a particle passing through. Glaser was able to maintain the superheated state for a few seconds before spontaneous boiling took place. The Alvarez team built chambers of 1.5 in, 2.5 in, 4 in, 10 in, and 15 in using liquid hydrogen, and constructed of metal with glass windows, so that the tracks could be photographed. The chamber could be cycled in synchronization with the accelerator beam, a picture could be taken, and the chamber recompressed in time for the next beam cycle.

This program built a liquid hydrogen bubble chamber almost 7 feet (2.1 meters) long, employed dozens of physicists and graduate students together with hundreds of engineers and technicians, took millions of photographs of particle interactions, developed computer systems to measure and analyze the interactions, and discovered families of new particles and resonance states. This work resulted in the Nobel Prize in Physics for Alvarez in 1968, "For his decisive contributions to elementary particle physics, in particular the discovery of a large number of resonant states, made possible through his development of the technique of using hydrogen bubble chambers and data analysis."

== Scientific detective work ==
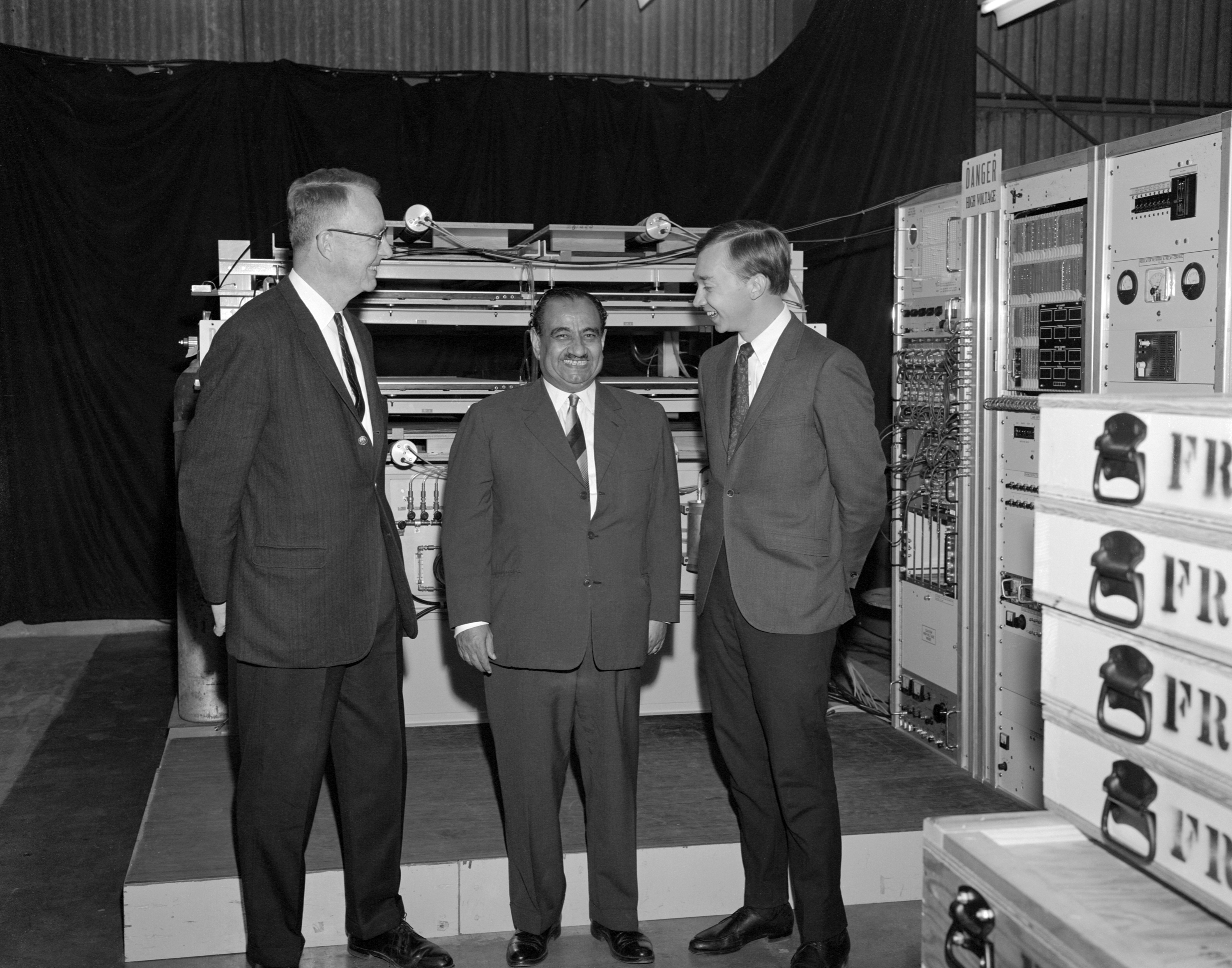
X-Raying the Pyramids with Egyptologist Ahmed Fakhry and Team Leader Jerry Anderson, Berkeley, 1967

In 1964, Alvarez proposed what became known as the High Altitude Particle Physics Experiment (HAPPE), originally conceived as a large superconducting magnet carried to high altitude by a balloon in order to study extremely high-energy particle interactions. In time the focus of the experiment changed toward the study of cosmology and the role of both particles and radiation in the early universe. This work was a large effort, carrying detectors aloft with high-altitude balloon flights and high-flying U-2 aircraft, and an early precursor of the COBE satellite-born experiments on the cosmic background radiation (which resulted in the award of the 2006 Nobel Prize, shared by George Smoot and John Mather).

Alvarez proposed muon tomography in 1965 to search the Egyptian pyramids for unknown chambers. Using naturally occurring cosmic rays, his plan was to place spark chambers, standard equipment in the high-energy particle physics of this time, beneath the Pyramid of Khafre in a known chamber. By measuring the counting rate of the cosmic rays in different directions the detector would reveal the existence of any void in the overlaying rock structure.

Alvarez assembled a team of physicists and archeologists from the United States and Egypt, the recording equipment was constructed and the experiment carried out, though it was interrupted by the 1967 Six-Day War. Restarted after the war, the effort continued, recording and analyzing the penetrating cosmic rays until 1969, when he reported to the American Physical Society that no chambers had been found in the 19% of the pyramid surveyed.

In November 1966, Life magazine published a series of photographs from the 1963 "Zapruder film", believed to be the most complete document of the assassination of John F. Kennedy. Alvarez, an expert in optics and photoanalysis, became intrigued by the pictures and began to study what could be learned from the film. Alvarez demonstrated both in theory and experiment that the backward snap of the President's head was consistent with his being shot from behind being called the "jet-effect" theory. Alvarez's theory was later refined and corroborated by other researchers. Alvarez also investigated the timing of the gunshots and the shockwave that disturbed the camera, and the speed of the camera, pointing out a number of details that the FBI photo analysts either overlooked or got wrong. He produced a paper intended as a tutorial, with informal advice for the physicist intent on arriving at the truth of the case.

== Dinosaur extinction hypothesis ==
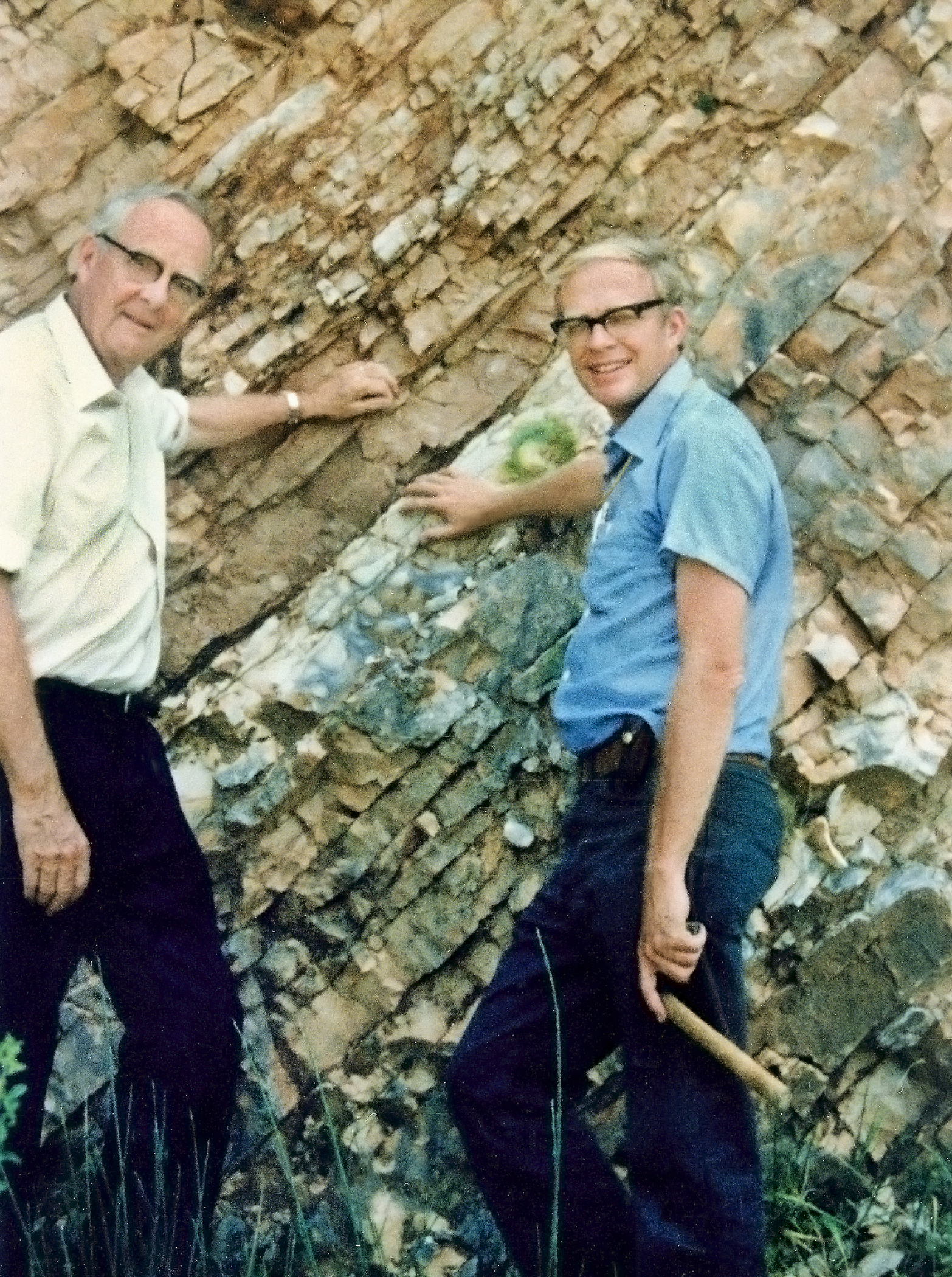
Luis and Walter Alvarez at the K-Pg Boundary in Gubbio, Italy, 1981

In 1980 Alvarez and his son, geologist Walter Alvarez, along with nuclear chemists Frank Asaro and Helen Michel, "uncovered a calamity that literally shook the Earth and is one of the great discoveries about Earth's history".

During the 1970s, Walter Alvarez was doing geological research in central Italy. There he had located an outcrop on the walls of a gorge whose limestone layers included strata both above and below the Cretaceous–Paleogene boundary. Exactly at the boundary is a thin layer of clay. Walter told his father that the layer marked where the dinosaurs and much else became extinct and that nobody knew why, or what the clay was about—it was a big mystery, and he intended to solve it.

Alvarez had access to the nuclear chemists at the Lawrence Berkeley Laboratory and was able to work with Frank Asaro and Helen Michel, who used the technique of neutron activation analysis to study the clay. In 1980, Alvarez, Alvarez, Asaro, and Michel published a seminal paper proposing an extraterrestrial cause for the Cretaceous-Paleogene extinction (then called the Cretaceous-Tertiary extinction). In the years following the publication of their article, the clay was also found to contain soot, glassy spherules, shocked quartz crystals, microscopic diamonds, and rare minerals formed only under conditions of great temperature and pressure.

Publication of the 1980 paper brought criticism from the geologic community, and an often acrimonious scientific debate ensued. Ten years later, after Alvarez's death, evidence was found of a large impact crater off the coast of the Yucatán peninsula in Mexico, providing support for the theory. Other researchers later found that the end-Cretaceous extinction of the dinosaurs may have occurred rapidly in geologic terms, over thousands of years, rather than millions of years as had previously been supposed. While alternative extinction theories have been proposed, including increased volcanism at the Deccan Traps, the impact crater theory remains dominant among relevant scholars.

== Aviation ==
In his autobiography, Alvarez said, "I think of myself as having had two separate careers, one in science and one in aviation. I've found the two almost equally rewarding." An important contributor to this was his enjoyment of flying. He learned to fly in 1933, later earning instrument and multi-engine ratings. Over the next 50 years he accumulated over 1000 hours of flight time, most of it as pilot in command. He said, "I found few activities as satisfying as being pilot in command with responsibility for my passengers' lives."

Alvarez made numerous professional contributions to aviation. During World War II he led the development of multiple aviation-related technologies. Several of his projects are described above, including Ground Controlled Approach (GCA) for which he was awarded the Collier Trophy in 1945. He also held the basic patent for the radar transponder, for which he assigned rights to the U.S. government for $1.

Later in his career Alvarez served on multiple high level advisory committees related to civilian and military aviation. These included a Federal Aviation Administration task group on future air navigation and air traffic control systems, the President's Science Advisory Committee Military Aircraft Panel, and a committee studying how the scientific community could help improve the United States' capabilities for fighting a nonnuclear war.

Alvarez's aviation responsibilities led to many adventures. For example, while working on GCA he became the first civilian to fly a low approach with his view outside the cockpit obstructed. He also flew many military aircraft from the co-pilot's seat, including a B-29 Superfortress and a Lockheed F-104 Starfighter. In addition, he survived a crash during World War II as a passenger in a Miles Master.

== Other activities ==
Alvarez was a member of the JASON Defense Advisory Group and the Bohemian Club.

== Death ==
Alvarez died on September 1, 1988, of complications from a succession of operations for esophageal cancer. His remains were cremated, and his ashes were scattered over Monterey Bay. His papers are in The Bancroft Library at the University of California, Berkeley.

== In popular culture ==
A thinly-disguised version of Alvarez appears in Sir Arthur C. Clarke's 1963 novel Glide Path.

In the 2023 film Oppenheimer, directed by Christopher Nolan, Alvarez was portrayed by actor Alex Wolff.

"Collisions" review: The Explosive Mind of Luis Alvarez" Banville highlighted the achievements and life of the Hispanic physical community throughout history.

== Honors ==
- Fellow of the American Physical Society (1939) and President (1969)
- Collier Trophy of the National Aeronautics Association (1946)
- Member of the National Academy of Sciences (1947)
- Medal for Merit (1947)
- Fellow of the American Philosophical Society (1953)
- Fellow of the American Academy of Arts and Sciences (1958)
- California Scientist of the Year (1960)
- Albert Einstein Award (1961)
- Golden Plate Award of the American Academy of Achievement (1961)
- National Medal of Science (1963)
- Michelson Award (1965)
- Nobel Prize in Physics (1968)
- Member of the National Academy of Engineering (1969)
- University of Chicago Alumni Medal (1978)
- National Inventors Hall of Fame (1978)
- Enrico Fermi award of the US Department of Energy (1987)
- IEEE Honorary Membership (1988)
- The Boy Scouts of America named their Cub Scout SUPERNOVA award for Alvarez (2012)
- Minor planet 3581 Alvarez is named after him and his son, Walter Alvarez.

== Selected publications ==
- "Two-element variable-power spherical lens", Patent US3305294A (December 1964)

== Patents ==
- Golf training device
- Electronuclear Reactor
- Optical range finder with variable angle exponential prism
- Two-element variable-power spherical lens
- Variable-power lens and system
- Subatomic particle detector with liquid electron multiplication medium
- Method of making Fresnelled optical element matrix
- Optical element of reduced thickness
- Method of forming an optical element of reduced thickness
- Deuterium tagged articles such as explosives and method for detection thereof
- Stabilized zoom binocular
- Stand alone collision avoidance system
- Television viewer
- Stabilized zoom binocular
- Optically stabilized camera lens system
- Nitrogen detection
- Inertial pendulum optical stabilizer

== General references ==
- Alvarez, L. W. (1987). Alvarez: Adventures of a Physicist. Basic Books. ISBN 0-465-00115-7 – via Internet Archive.
- Heilbron, J. L.; Seidel, R. W. (1989). Lawrence and His Laboratory. University of California Press. ISBN 0-520-06426-7.
- Trower, W. P. (2009). Luis Walter Alvarez 1911–1988 (PDF). Biographical Memoirs. National Academy of Sciences.
- Trower, W. P. (1987). Discovering Alvarez: Selected Works of Luis W. Alvarez with Commentary by His Students and Colleagues. University of Chicago Press. ISBN 0-226-81304-5.
