= Graham Johnson (author) =

British writer and investigative journalist

Graham Johnson (born 4 May 1968) is an author and investigative journalist from Liverpool in the United Kingdom. He has written for several news organisation and the since the 2000s has written both non-fiction and fiction books. His works focuses largely crime, especially organised crime. Johnson has made documentary films and appeared on television as a crime pundit.

== Biography ==
Between 1995 and 1997, Johnson worked at the News of the World. He had a notorious scoop about the Beast of Bodmin Moor at the paper. Johnson later explained that there was of culture of fear at the paper and he fabricated stories under pressure from his bosses.

Johnson worked at the Sunday Mirror from 1997 to 2005 and for six years was the newspaper's Investigations Editor.

To research his debut novel, Powder Wars (2004), Johnson spent several years on and off embedded with some of Britain's most notorious gangs.

He penned British gangster Stephen French's 2007 memoir, The Devil.

In 2012, Johnson's book Hack was published, about his life as a tabloid journalist. In it he claims the story alleging Arthur C. Clarke purchased sex from underaged boys in Sri Lanka was dropped by News of the World; so as not to upset its owner Rupert Murdoch.

In 2014, he "blew the whistle" regarding phone hacking at the Sunday Mirror, describing his own involvement as "short and intense". Johnson, who was "shown by a senior person in a supervisory capacity how to access voicemails", was given "great credit" by District judge Quentin Purdy for his confession. His defence asserted that Johnson was unaware that such hacking was illegal, and that he "discontinued... because he did not feel it was right". Judge Brian Barker gave Johnson a suspended sentence but was convinced of his remorse, and noted that he had been "directed by others". Johnson also spoke of a culture of fear at News of the World, in which journalists would use various unscrupulous tactics at the behest of editor Rebekah Brooks.

== Writing and appearances ==
Johnson has written for publications including the News of the World, the Sunday Mirror, The Observer, Vice, The Guardian and the Liverpool Echo, and often publishes crime stories under different bylines.

Johnson has covered stories including drug dealing in Britain, people smuggling in Europe, child slavery in India and Pakistan, and war in the Balkans. Johnson's novels have been published by Mainstream Publishing and Simon & Schuster.

Johnson has appeared on Sky and BBC as a crime pundit and reporter. He has also made documentaries for Sky, Panorama and Germany's ARD. For Vice, Johnson has produced two documentaries, Fraud and The Debt Collector, which are informed by his own investigations. The Debt Collector was based on his books The Cartel and Young Blood.

=== Bibliography ===
Non-fiction (true crime)

- Powder Wars (2004)
- Druglord (2005)
- Football and Gangsters (2006)
- The Devil (2007)
- Darkness Descending (2009)
- Hack (2012)
- The Cartel (2012)
- Young Blood (2013)

Novels

- Soljas (2010)
- Gang War (2011)
- EastRush (2017)

== Reception ==
Johnson Described in parliament as an "investigative reporter supreme".

He was shortlisted for Reporter of the Year at the 2005 British Press Awards.
