= Galloway Puma =

Scottish phantom cat

In Scottish folklore, the Galloway Puma is a "phantom cat" said to dwell in Dumfries and Galloway, in south-west Scotland.

The rumours of a big cat in Galloway began in the late 1990s, when Canadian tourists claimed to have seen an animal which resembled a cougar near Kirroughtree, south-east of Newton Stewart. The tourists apparently saw the animal while returning from a nature walk in the Galloway Forest. It was also allegedly sighted by locals in Newton Stewart in 1999.

After this, many people, specifically farmers and Forestry Commission workers, claimed to have seen a big black cat throughout the region, but mainly in the Machars area. In June 2001, a young lady walking her dog near Newton Stewart golf course, which lies on the edge of Galloway Forest, was left startled and shaken when what she described as a "large black cat, bigger than an alsatian", sprung out at her on the path on which she was walking. She further claims that the animal ran away after her dog began barking and growling at it.

== See also ==
- Beast of Buchan
- British big cats
