= Anthony Bonanno =

Maltese archaeologist (born 1947)

Anthony Bonanno is a Maltese archaeologist based at the University of Malta who has published several books about the archaeology of the Maltese Islands. He was born on 4 June 1947 in the city of Żejtun. He has been on various boards and committees, including the Planning Authority, Heritage Malta and the Scientific Committee for the Conservation of the Megalithic Temples.
