= The View from Serendip =

1977 collection of essays and anecdotes by Arthur C. Clarke

- Cover of the first edition
- Author: Arthur C. Clarke
- Cover artist: Terry Steadham
- Language: English
- Publisher: Random House
- Publication date: October 1977
- Media type: Print (hardback & paperback)
- Pages: 273
- ISBN: 0-394-41796-8

The View from Serendip is a collection of essays and anecdotes by Arthur C. Clarke, first published in 1977. The pieces include Clarke's experiences with diving, Sri Lanka, his relationships with other science fiction authors such as Isaac Asimov, and other personal memoirs. There are also reproductions of past lectures, as well as speculations about things of scientific interest. The essay "The World of 2001" had been previously published in Vogue. It predicted the end of menial labor (mental as well as manual), due to automation and bio-engineered apes.
