= Arthur C. Clarke =

English science fiction writer (1917–2008)

Sri Lankabhimanya Sir Arthur C. Clarke CBE FRAS
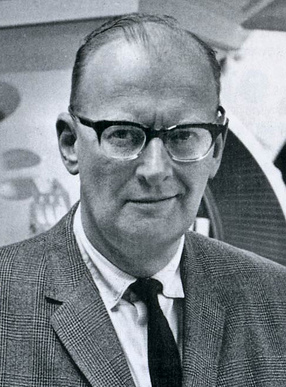
- Clarke in 1965
- Born: Arthur Charles Clarke; 16 December 1917; Minehead, Somerset, England
- Died: 19 March 2008 (aged 90); Colombo, Sri Lanka
- Education: King's College London
- Occupations: Writer; inventor; futurist
- Spouse: Marilyn Mayfield (m. 1953; div. 1964)
- Writing career
- Pen name: Charles Willis; E. G. O'Brien
- Period: 1946–2008
- Genres: Hard science fiction; Popular science
- Subject: Science
- Notable works: Childhood's End; 2001: A Space Odyssey; Rendezvous with Rama; The Fountains of Paradise
- Military career
- Allegiance: United Kingdom
- Branch: Royal Air Force
- Service years: 1941–1946
- Rank: Flying officer
- Conflicts: World War II; Western Front; Battle of Britain
- Website: clarkefoundation.org

Sir Arthur Charles Clarke (16 December 1917 – 19 March 2008) was an English science fiction writer, inventor, undersea explorer and TV series host.

He popularised space travel and wrote many books and many essays for popular magazines. In 1961, he received the Kalinga Prize, a UNESCO award for popularising science. Clarke's science and science fiction writings earned him the moniker "Prophet of the Space Age". His science fiction writings in particular earned him a number of Hugo and Nebula awards, which, along with a large readership, made him one of the leading figures of the genre. Clarke co-wrote the screenplay for the 1968 film 2001: A Space Odyssey, regarded as one of the most influential films of all time.

Clarke was a lifelong proponent of space travel. In 1934, while still a teenager, he joined the British Interplanetary Society (BIS). In 1945, he proposed a satellite communication system using geostationary orbits. He was the chairman of the BIS from 1946 to 1947 and again in 1951–1953.

Clarke emigrated to Ceylon in 1956 to pursue his interest in scuba diving. That year he discovered the underwater ruins of the ancient original Koneswaram Temple in Trincomalee. In the 1980s, Clarke hosted television shows such as Arthur C. Clarke's Mysterious World. He lived in Sri Lanka until his death.

Clarke was appointed Commander of the Order of the British Empire (CBE) in 1989 "for services to British cultural interests in Sri Lanka". He was knighted in 2000, after requesting the honours be postponed due to child sex abuse allegations, later dismissed. He was also awarded Sri Lanka's highest civil honour, Sri Lankabhimanya, in 2005.

== Biography ==
=== Early years ===
Clarke was born in Minehead, Somerset, England, and grew up in nearby Bishops Lydeard. As a boy, he lived on a farm, where he enjoyed stargazing, fossil collecting and reading American science fiction pulp magazines. He received his secondary education at Huish's Grammar School in Taunton. Some of his early influences included dinosaur cigarette cards, which led to an enthusiasm for fossils starting about 1925. Clarke attributed his interest in science fiction to reading three items: the November 1928 issue of Amazing Stories in 1929; Last and First Men by Olaf Stapledon in 1930; and The Conquest of Space by David Lasser in 1931.

In his teens, he joined the Junior Astronomical Association and contributed to Urania, the society's journal, which was edited in Glasgow by Marion Eadie. At Clarke's request, she added an "Astronautics" section, which featured a series of articles written by him on spacecraft and space travel. Clarke also contributed pieces to the "Debates and Discussions Corner", a counterpoint to a Urania article offering the case against space travel, and also his recollections of the Walt Disney film Fantasia. He moved to London in 1936 and joined the Board of Education as a pensions auditor. He and some fellow science fiction writers shared a flat in Gray's Inn Road, where he got the nickname "Ego" because of his absorption in subjects that interested him, and later named his office filled with memorabilia as his "ego chamber".

=== World War II ===
During the Second World War from 1941 to 1946, he served in the Royal Air Force as a radar specialist and was involved in the early-warning radar defence system, which contributed to the RAF's success during the Battle of Britain. Clarke spent most of his wartime service working on ground-controlled approach (GCA) radar, as documented in the semiautobiographical Glide Path, his only non-science fiction novel. Although GCA did not see much practical use during the war, after several years of development it proved vital to the Berlin Airlift of 1948–1949. Clarke initially served in the ranks and was a corporal instructor on radar at No. 2 Radio School, RAF Yatesbury in Wiltshire. He was commissioned as a pilot officer (technical branch) on 27 May 1943. He was promoted to flying officer on 27 November 1943. He was appointed chief training instructor at RAF Honiley in Warwickshire and was demobilised with the rank of flight lieutenant.

=== Post-war ===
After the war, he attained a first-class degree in mathematics and physics from King's College London. After this, he worked as assistant editor at Physics Abstracts. Clarke served as president of the British Interplanetary Society from 1946 to 1947 and again from 1951 to 1953.

Although he was not the originator of the concept of geostationary satellites, one of his most important contributions in this field was his idea that they would be ideal telecommunications relays. He advanced this idea in a paper privately circulated among the core technical members of the British Interplanetary Society in 1945. The concept was published in Wireless World in October of that year. Clarke also wrote a number of nonfiction books describing the technical details and societal implications of rocketry and space flight. These include Interplanetary Flight: An Introduction to Astronautics (1950), The Exploration of Space (1951) and The Promise of Space (1968). In recognition of these contributions, the geostationary orbit 36,000 kilometres (22,000 mi) above the equator is officially recognised by the International Astronomical Union as the Clarke Orbit.

His 1951 book, The Exploration of Space, was used by the rocket pioneer Wernher von Braun to convince President John F. Kennedy that it was possible to go to the Moon.

Following the 1968 release of 2001, Clarke became much in demand as a commentator on science and technology, especially at the time of the Apollo space program. On 20 July 1969, Clarke appeared as a commentator for the CBS News broadcast of the Apollo 11 Moon landing.

=== Sri Lanka and diving ===
Clarke lived in Sri Lanka from 1956 until his death in 2008, first in Unawatuna on the south coast and then in Colombo. Initially, he and his friend Mike Wilson travelled around Sri Lanka, diving in the coral waters around the coast with the Beachcombers Club. In 1957, during a dive trip off Trincomalee, Clarke discovered the underwater ruins of a temple, which subsequently made the region popular with divers. He described it in his 1957 book The Reefs of Taprobane. This was his second diving book after the 1956 The Coast of Coral. Though Clarke lived mostly in Colombo, he set up a small dive school and a simple dive shop near Trincomalee. He dived often at Hikkaduwa, Trincomalee and Nilaveli.

The Sri Lankan government offered Clarke resident guest status in 1975. He was held in such high esteem that when fellow science fiction writer Robert A. Heinlein came to visit, the Sri Lanka Air Force provided a helicopter to take them around the country. In the early 1970s, Clarke signed a three-book publishing deal, a record for a science fiction writer at the time. The first of the three was Rendezvous with Rama in 1973, which won all the main genre awards and spawned sequels that along with the 2001 series formed the backbone of his later career.

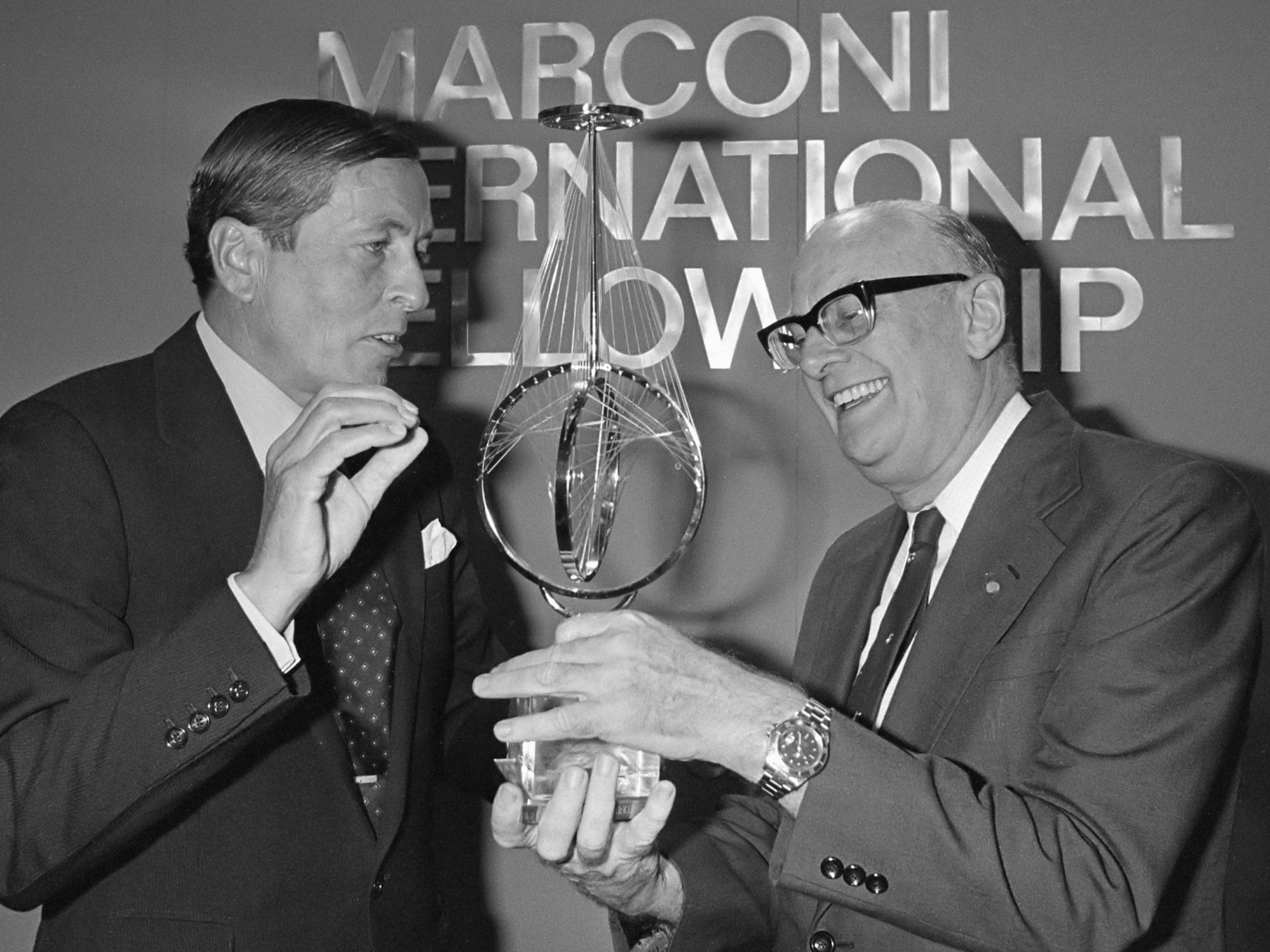
Clarke receives the Marconi International Fellowship Award from Prince Claus of the Netherlands in 1982.

In 1986, Clarke was named a Grand Master by the Science Fiction Writers of America.

In 1988, he was diagnosed with post-polio syndrome, having originally contracted polio in 1962, and needed to use a wheelchair most of the time thereafter. Clarke was for many years a vice-patron of the British Polio Fellowship.

In the 1989 Queen's Birthday Honours, Clarke was appointed Commander of the Order of the British Empire (CBE) "for services to British cultural interests in Sri Lanka". The same year, he became the first chancellor of the International Space University, serving from 1989 to 2004. He also served as chancellor of Moratuwa University in Sri Lanka from 1979 to 2002.

In 1994, Clarke appeared in a science fiction film; he portrayed himself in the film Without Warning, an American production about an apocalyptic alien first-contact scenario presented in the form of a faux newscast.

Clarke also became active in promoting the protection of gorillas and became a patron of the Gorilla Organization, which fights for the preservation of gorillas. When tantalum mining for mobile phone manufacture threatened the gorillas in 2001, he lent his voice to their cause. The dive shop that he set up continues to operate from Trincomalee through the Arthur C Clarke Foundation.

=== Television series host ===
In the 1980s and early 1990s, Clarke presented his television programmes Arthur C. Clarke's Mysterious World, Arthur C. Clarke's World of Strange Powers and Arthur C. Clarke's Mysterious Universe.

=== Personal life ===
On a trip to Florida in 1953, Clarke met and quickly married Marilyn Mayfield, a 22-year-old American divorcee with a young son. They separated permanently after six months, although the divorce was not finalised until 1964. "The marriage was incompatible from the beginning", said Clarke. Marilyn never remarried and died in 1991.

Clarke also never remarried, but was close to a Sri Lankan man, Leslie Ekanayake (13 July 1947 – 4 July 1977), whom Clarke called his "only perfect friend of a lifetime" in the dedication to his novel The Fountains of Paradise. (Note: Full dedication reads: "To the still unfading memory of LESLIE EKANAYAKE (13 JuIy 1947 – 4 July 1977) only perfect friend of a lifetime, in whom were uniquely combined Loyalty, Intelligence and Compassion. When your radiant and loving spirit vanished from this world, the light went out of many lives.") Clarke is buried with Ekanayake, who predeceased him by three decades, in Kanatte Cemetery, Colombo's main burial ground and crematorium. In his biography of Stanley Kubrick, John Baxter cites Clarke's homosexuality as a reason why he relocated, due to more tolerant laws with regard to homosexuality in Sri Lanka. Journalists who enquired of Clarke whether he was gay were told, "No, merely mildly cheerful." However, Michael Moorcock wrote:

Everyone knew he was gay. In the 1950s, I'd go out drinking with his boyfriend. We met his protégés, western and eastern, and their families, people who had only the most generous praise for his kindness. Self-absorbed he might be and a teetotaller, but an impeccable gent through and through.

In an interview in the July 1986 issue of Playboy magazine, when asked if he had had a bisexual experience, Clarke stated, "Of course. Who hasn't?". In his obituary, Clarke's friend Kerry O'Quinn wrote: "Yes, Arthur was gay ... As Isaac Asimov once told me, 'I think he simply found he preferred men.' Arthur didn't publicise his sexuality – that wasn't the focus of his life – but if asked, he was open and honest."

Clarke accumulated a vast collection of manuscripts and personal memoirs, maintained by his brother Fred Clarke in Taunton, Somerset, England, and referred to as the "Clarkives". Clarke said some of his private diaries will not be published until 30 years after his death. When asked why they were sealed, he answered, "Well, there might be all sorts of embarrassing things in them."

=== Knighthood ===
On 26 May 2000, he was made a Knight Bachelor "for services to literature" at a ceremony in Colombo. (Note: Letters Patent were issued by Elizabeth II of the United Kingdom on 16 March 2000 to authorise this.) The knighthood had been awarded in the 1998 New Year Honours list, but investiture with the award had been delayed, at Clarke's request, because of an accusation by the tabloid the Sunday Mirror of paying boys for sex. The charge was subsequently found to be baseless by the Sri Lankan police. According to The Daily Telegraph, the Sunday Mirror subsequently published an apology, and Clarke chose not to sue for defamation. The Independent alleged that a similar story was not published because Clarke was a friend of newspaper tycoon Rupert Murdoch. Clarke himself said, "I take an extremely dim view of people mucking about with boys", and Rupert Murdoch allegedly promised him the reporters responsible would never work in Fleet Street again.

=== Later years ===
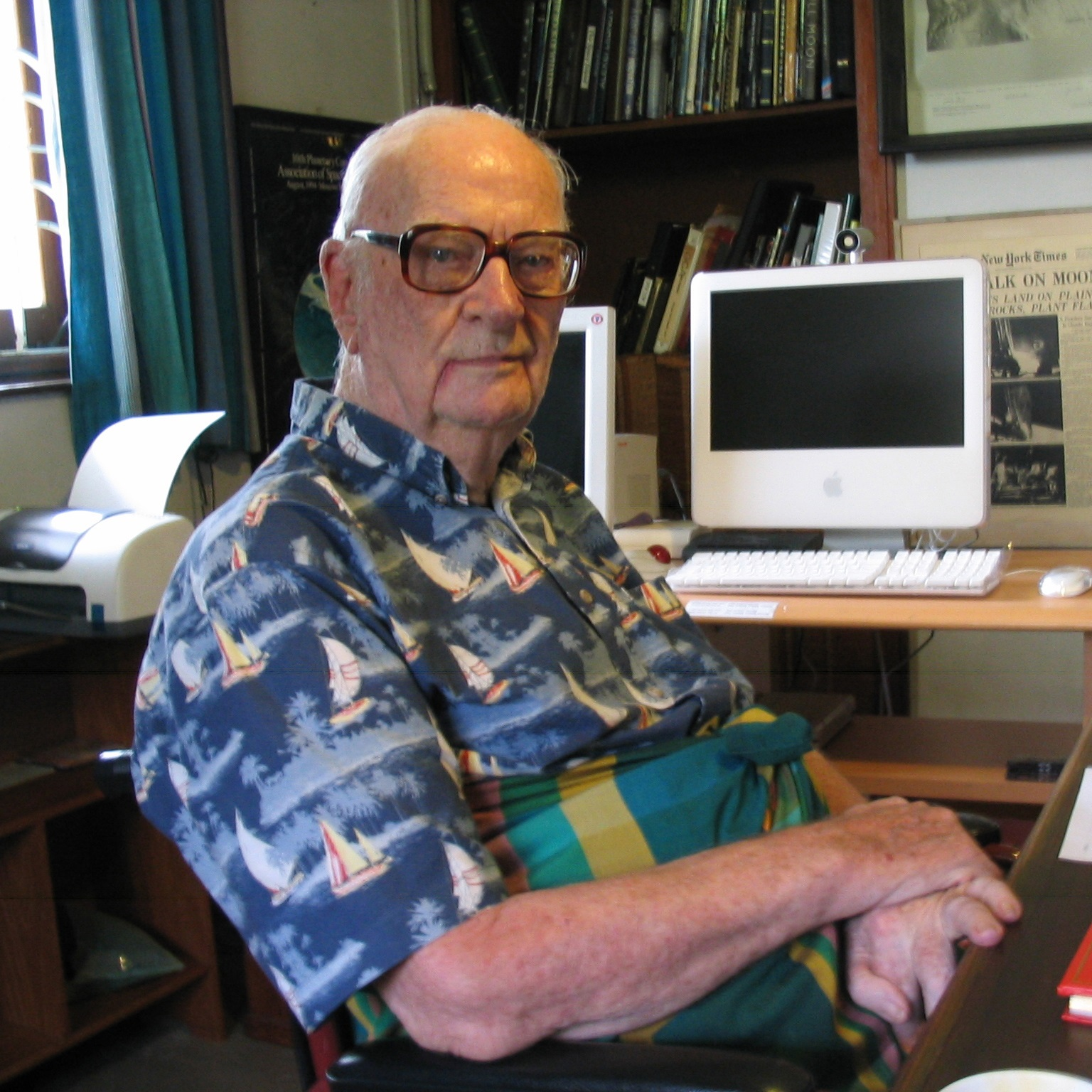
Clarke at his home in Sri Lanka, 2005

Although he and his home were unharmed by the 2004 Indian Ocean earthquake tsunami, his "Arthur C. Clarke Diving School" (now called "Underwater Safaris") at Hikkaduwa near Galle was destroyed. He made humanitarian appeals, and the Arthur C. Clarke Foundation worked towards better disaster notification systems.

Because of his post-polio deficits, which limited his ability to travel and gave him halting speech, most of Clarke's communications in his last years were in the form of recorded addresses. In July 2007, he provided a video address for the Robert A. Heinlein Centennial in which he closed his comments with a goodbye to his fans. In September 2007, he provided a video greeting for NASA's Cassini probe's flyby of Iapetus (which plays an important role in the book of 2001: A Space Odyssey). In December 2007 on his 90th birthday, Clarke recorded a video message (although it was "audio-only" due to his post-polio disabilities) to his friends and fans bidding them goodbye.

Clarke died in Colombo on 19 March 2008, at the age of 90. His aide described the cause as respiratory complications and heart failure stemming from post-polio syndrome.

Just hours before Clarke's death, a major gamma-ray burst (GRB) reached Earth. Known as GRB 080319B, the burst set a new record as the farthest object that can be seen from Earth with the naked eye. It occurred about 7.5 billion years ago, the light taking that long to reach Earth. Larry Sessions, a science writer for Sky and Telescope magazine blogging on earthsky.org, suggested that the burst be named the "Clarke Event". American Atheist Magazine wrote of the idea: "It would be a fitting tribute to a man who contributed so much, and helped lift our eyes and our minds to a cosmos once thought to be province only of gods."

A few days before he died, he had reviewed the manuscript of his final work, The Last Theorem, on which he had collaborated by e-mail with contemporary Frederik Pohl. The book was published after Clarke's death. Clarke was buried in Colombo in traditional Sri Lankan fashion on 22 March. His younger brother, Fred, and his Sri Lankan adoptive family were among the thousands in attendance.

Clarke's papers were donated to the American National Air and Space Museum in 2014.

On 8 January 2024, a sample of Clarke's DNA was launched on the Peregrine Mission One to the Moon. The Peregrine spacecraft failed to land on the Moon, and the spacecraft disintegrated in the Earth's atmosphere on 19 January 2024.

=== Child sex abuse allegations ===
In 1998, The Sunday Mirror published an interview of Clarke conducted by reporter Graham Johnson in Sri Lanka. The article alleged that Clarke was a paedophile and quoted Clarke as saying:

"I have never had the slightest interest in children – boys or girls. They should be treated in the same way. But once they have reached the age of puberty, then it is OK. If the kids enjoy it and don't mind it doesn't do any harm … there is a hysteria about the whole thing in the West.... I am trying to think of the youngest boy I have ever had because, of course, you can't tell it here."

Clarke denied the allegations and said he was "disturbed to discover that there has been a long-standing conspiracy here in Sri Lanka to discredit [him] ... involving activists associated with child welfare organisations." He threatened legal action but ultimately did not sue the Sunday Mirror. Clarke requested that Prince Charles delay his investiture as a knight to avoid embarrassing the royal family; he received it two years later.

Sri Lanka's Presidential Task Force on the Prevention of Child Abuse, assisted by Interpol, interrogated Clarke. Following Clarke's death, Sri Lanka's National Child Protection Authority chief stated that Clarke had been cleared of all allegations and that there was no formal testimony or complaints from purported victims.

A 2012 book by Johnson alleged that the News of the World spiked a story outing Clarke as a paedophile to appease owner Rupert Murdoch, a friend of Clarke. News of the World editor Phil Hall said that Murdoch never asked for stories to be spiked, and told The Independent that "My only recollection is that the only reason we wouldn't publish it was because of legal reasons."

== Science fiction writer ==
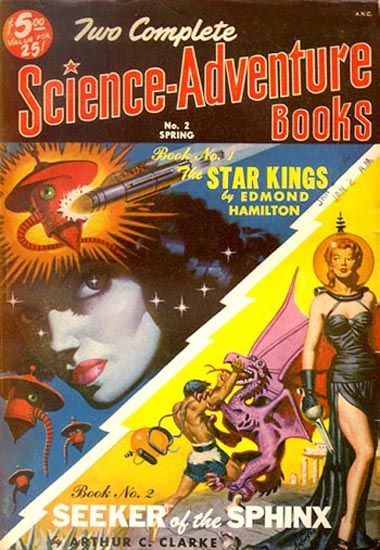
Clarke's novella "The Road to the Sea" was originally published in Two Complete Science-Adventure Books in 1951 as "Seeker of the Sphinx".

=== Beginnings ===
While Clarke had a few stories published in fanzines, between 1937 and 1945, his first professional sale appeared in Astounding Science Fiction in 1946: "Loophole" was published in April, while "Rescue Party", his first sale, was published in May. (Note: ISFDB catalogues one "Letter" to Amazing Stories published in 1935, 10 more nonfiction items ("Essays") published 1938 to 1945, and five "Shortfiction" published 1937 to 1942.) Along with his writing, Clarke briefly worked as assistant editor of Science Abstracts (1949) before devoting himself in 1951 to full-time writing.

Clarke began carving out his reputation as a "scientific" science fiction writer with his first science fiction novel, Against the Fall of Night, published as a novella in 1948. It was very popular and considered ground-breaking work for some of the concepts it contained. Clarke revised and expanded the novella into a full novel, which was published in 1953. Clarke later rewrote and expanded this work a third time to become The City and the Stars in 1956, which rapidly became a definitive must-read in the field. His third science fiction novel, Childhood's End, was also published in 1953, cementing his popularity. Clarke capped the first phase of his writing career with his sixth novel, A Fall of Moondust, in 1961, which is also an acknowledged classic of the period.

During this time, Clarke corresponded with C. S. Lewis in the 1940s and 1950s and they once met in an Oxford pub, the Eastgate, to discuss science fiction and space travel. Clarke voiced great praise for Lewis upon his death, saying The Ransom Trilogy was one of the few works of science fiction that should be considered literature.

=== "The Sentinel" ===
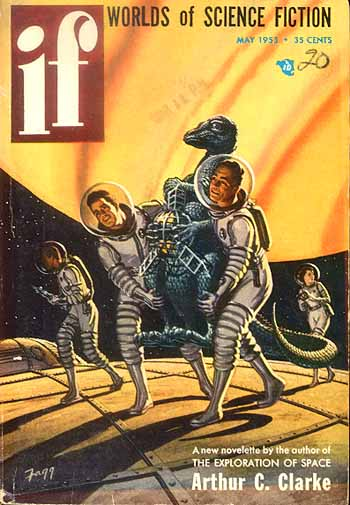
Clarke's novelette "Jupiter Five" was cover-featured on the May 1953 issue of If.

In 1948, he wrote "The Sentinel" for a BBC competition. Though the story was rejected, it changed the course of Clarke's career. Not only was it the basis for 2001: A Space Odyssey, but "The Sentinel" also introduced a more cosmic element to Clarke's work. Many of Clarke's later works feature a technologically advanced but still-prejudiced mankind being confronted by a superior alien intelligence. In the cases of Childhood's End, and the 2001 series, this encounter produces a conceptual breakthrough that accelerates humanity into the next stage of its evolution. This also applies in the far-distant past (but our future) in The City and the Stars (and its original version, Against the Fall of Night).

In Clarke's authorised biography, Neil McAleer writes: "many readers and critics still consider Childhood's End Arthur C. Clarke's best novel." But Clarke did not use ESP in any of his later stories, saying, "I've always been interested in ESP, and of course, Childhood's End was about that. But I've grown disillusioned, partly because after all this time, they're still arguing about whether these things happen. I suspect that telepathy does happen."

A collection of early essays was published in The View from Serendip (1977), which also included one short piece of fiction, "When the Twerms Came". Clarke also wrote short stories under the pseudonyms of E. G. O'Brien and Charles Willis. Almost all of his short stories can be found in the book The Collected Stories of Arthur C. Clarke (2001).

=== "Big Three" ===
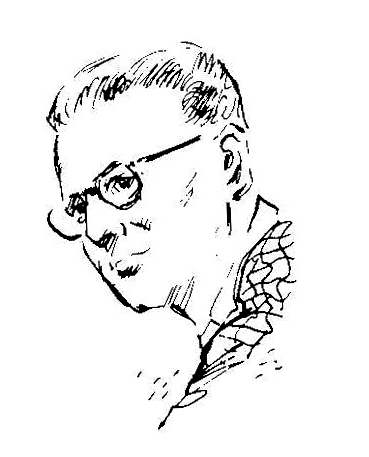
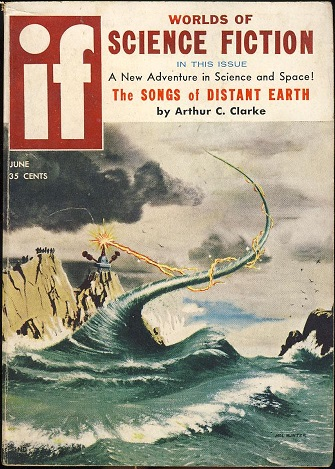
Clarke as depicted in Amazing Stories in 1953 (left) and the cover story for Clarke's novelette "The Songs of Distant Earth" in the June 1958 issue of If (right), expanded to novel length almost three decades later

For much of the later 20th century, Clarke, Isaac Asimov, and Robert A. Heinlein were informally known as the "Big Three" of science fiction writers. Clarke and Heinlein began writing to each other after The Exploration of Space was published in 1951, and first met in person the following year. They remained on cordial terms for many years, including during visits to the United States and Sri Lanka.

Clarke and Asimov first met in New York City in 1953, and they traded friendly insults and gibes for decades. They established an oral agreement, the "Clarke–Asimov Treaty", that when asked who was better, the two would say Clarke was the better science fiction writer and Asimov was the better science writer. In 1972, Clarke put the "treaty" on paper in his dedication to Report on Planet Three and Other Speculations.

In 1984, Clarke testified before Congress against the Strategic Defense Initiative (SDI). Later, at the home of Larry Niven in California, a concerned Heinlein attacked Clarke's views on United States foreign and space policy (especially the SDI), vigorously advocating a strong defence posture. Although the two later reconciled formally, they remained distant until Heinlein's death in 1988.

=== Space Odyssey series ===
2001: A Space Odyssey, Clarke's most famous work, was extended well beyond the original 1968 film as the Space Odyssey series. In 1982, Clarke wrote a sequel to 2001 titled 2010: Odyssey Two, which was made into a film in 1984. Clarke wrote two further sequels which have not been adapted into motion pictures: 2061: Odyssey Three (published in 1987) and 3001: The Final Odyssey (published in 1997).

2061: Odyssey Three involves a visit to Halley's Comet on its next plunge through the Inner Solar System and a spaceship crash on the Jovian moon Europa. The whereabouts of astronaut Dave Bowman (the "Star Child"), the artificial intelligence HAL 9000, and the development of native life on Europa, protected by the alien Monolith, are revealed.

Finally, in 3001: The Final Odyssey, astronaut Frank Poole's freeze-dried body, found by a spaceship beyond the orbit of Neptune, is revived by advanced medical science. The novel details the threat posed to humanity by the alien monoliths, whose actions are not always as their builders had intended.

==== 2001: A Space Odyssey ====
Clarke's first venture into film was 2001: A Space Odyssey, directed by Stanley Kubrick. Kubrick and Clarke had met in New York City in 1964 to discuss the possibility of a collaborative film project. As the idea developed, they decided to loosely base the story on Clarke's short story, "The Sentinel", written in 1948 as an entry in a BBC short-story competition. Originally, Clarke was going to write the screenplay for the film, but Kubrick suggested during one of their brainstorming meetings that before beginning on the actual script, they should let their imaginations soar free by writing a novel first, on which they would base the film. "This is more or less the way it worked out, though toward the end, novel and screenplay were being written simultaneously, with feedback in both directions. Thus, I rewrote some sections after seeing the movie rushes – a rather expensive method of literary creation, which few other authors can have enjoyed." The novel ended up being published a few months after the release of the movie.

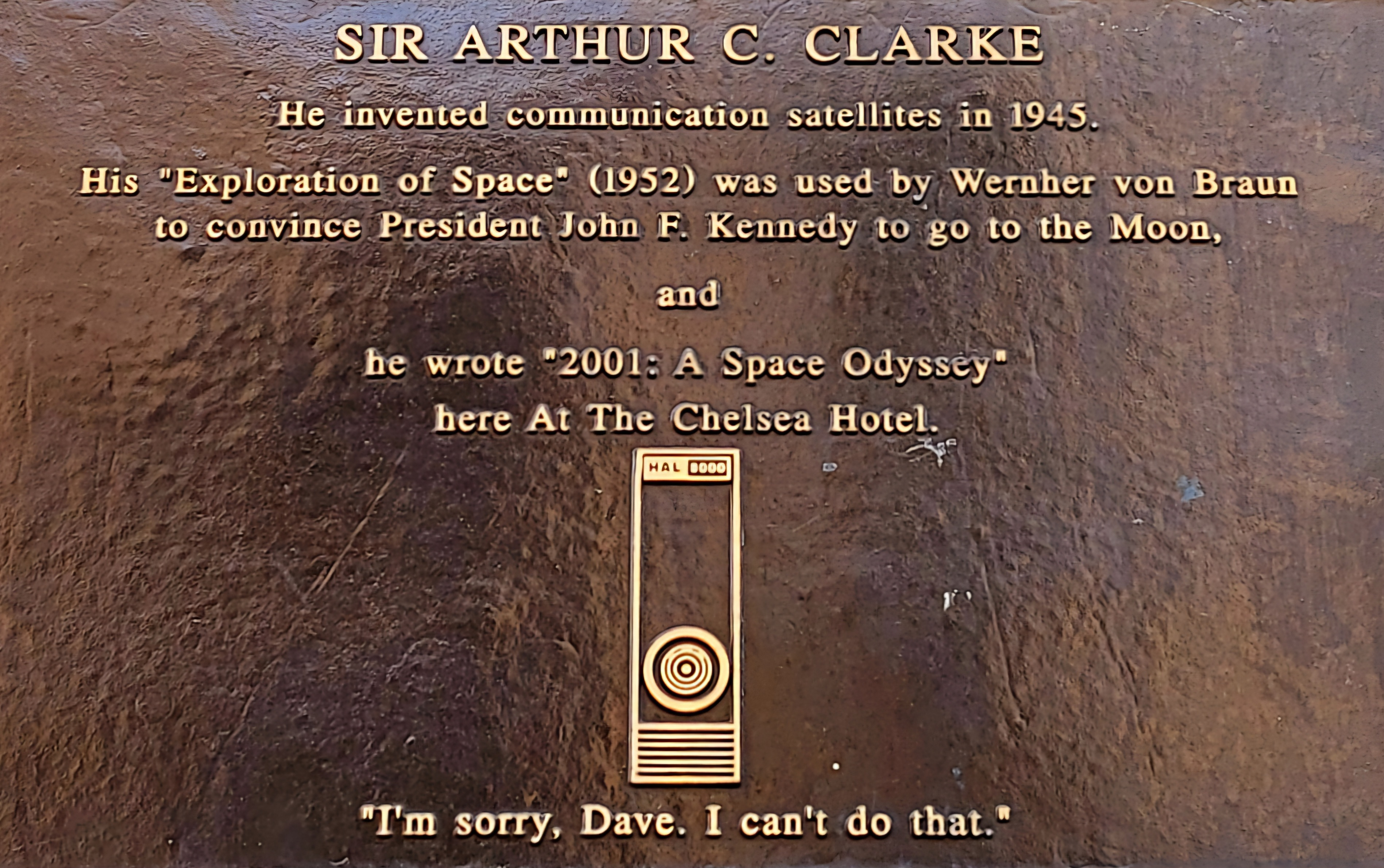
Plaque at the Hotel Chelsea in New York City, where Clarke lived while writing 2001: A Space Odyssey.

Due to the hectic schedule of the film's production, Kubrick and Clarke had difficulty collaborating on the book. Clarke completed a draft of the novel at the end of 1964 with the plan to publish in 1965 in advance of the film's release in 1966. After many delays, the film was released in the spring of 1968, before the book was completed. The book was credited to Clarke alone. Clarke later complained that this had the effect of making the book into a novelisation, and that Kubrick had manipulated circumstances to play down Clarke's authorship. For these and other reasons, the details of the story differ slightly from the book to the movie. The film contains little explanation for the events taking place. Clarke, though, wrote thorough explanations of "cause and effect" for the events in the novel. James Randi later recounted that upon seeing the premiere of 2001, Clarke left the theatre at the intermission in tears, after having watched an eleven-minute scene (which did not make it into general release) where an astronaut is doing nothing more than jogging inside the spaceship, which was Kubrick's idea of showing the audience how boring space travels could be.

In 1972, Clarke published The Lost Worlds of 2001, which included his accounts of the production, and alternative versions of key scenes. The "special edition" of the novel A Space Odyssey (released in 1999) contains an introduction by Clarke in which he documents the events leading to the release of the novel and film.

==== 2010: Odyssey Two ====
In 1982, Clarke continued the 2001 epic with a sequel, 2010: Odyssey Two. This novel was also made into a film, 2010, directed by Peter Hyams for release in 1984. Because of the political environment in America in the 1980s, the film presents a Cold War theme, with the looming tensions of nuclear warfare not featured in the novel. The film was not considered to be as revolutionary or artistic as 2001, but the reviews were still positive.

Clarke's email correspondence with Hyams was published in 1984. Titled The Odyssey File: The Making of 2010, and co-authored with Hyams, it illustrates his fascination with the then-pioneering medium of email and its use for them to communicate on an almost daily basis at the time of planning and production of the film while living on opposite sides of the world. The book also included Clarke's personal list of the best science fiction films ever made.

Clarke appeared in the film, first as the man feeding the pigeons while Dr. Heywood Floyd is engaged in a conversation in front of the White House. Later, in the hospital scene with David Bowman's mother, an image of the cover of Time portrays Clarke as the American President and Kubrick as the Soviet Premier.

=== Rendezvous with Rama ===
In 1996, Sierra Entertainment created Rama as a point and click adventure game in the style of Myst. Along with highly detailed graphics, Arthur C. Clarke also appeared in the game as the guide for the player. This game featured details from Rendezvous with Rama and characters from the Rama II novel.

Rendezvous with Rama was optioned for filmmaking in the early 21st century but this motion picture has remained in "development hell". After a drawn-out development process, which actor Morgan Freeman attributed to difficulties in getting financing, it appeared in 2003 that this project might be proceeding. The film was to be produced by Freeman's production company, Revelations Entertainment, with David Fincher being touted as the film's director. After years of no progress, in late 2008, Fincher stated the movie is unlikely to be made, given Morgan Freeman's health. In 2010, though, the film was still planned for future production and both Freeman and Fincher mentioned it as still needing a worthy script. In late 2021, Denis Villeneuve was introduced as director.

== Science writer ==
Clarke published a number of nonfiction books with essays, speeches, addresses, etc. Several of his nonfiction books are composed of chapters that can stand on their own as separate essays.

=== Space travel ===
In particular, Clarke was a populariser of the concept of space travel. In 1950, he wrote Interplanetary Flight, a book outlining the basics of space flight for laymen. Later books about space travel included The Exploration of Space (1951), The Challenge of the Spaceship (1959), Voices from the Sky (1965), The Promise of Space (1968, rev. ed. 1970), and Report on Planet Three (1972) along with many others.

=== Futurism ===
His books on space travel usually included chapters about other aspects of science and technology, such as computers and bioengineering. He predicted telecommunication satellites (albeit serviced by astronauts in space suits, who would replace the satellite's vacuum tubes as they burned out).

His many predictions culminated in 1958 when he began a series of magazine essays which eventually became Profiles of the Future, published in book form in 1962. A timetable up to the year 2100 describes inventions and ideas including such things as a "global library" for 2005. The same work also contained "Clarke's First Law" and text that became Clarke's three laws in later editions.

In a 1959 essay, Clarke predicted global satellite TV broadcasts that would cross national boundaries indiscriminately and would bring hundreds of channels available anywhere in the world. He also envisioned a "personal transceiver, so small and compact that every man carries one". He wrote: "the time will come when we will be able to call a person anywhere on Earth merely by dialing a number." Such a device would also, in Clarke's vision, include means for global positioning so "no one need ever again be lost". Later, in Profiles of the Future, he predicted the advent of such a device taking place in the mid-1980s.

1974 ABC interview with Clarke in which he describes a future of ubiquitous computing reminiscent of the modern Internet

Clarke described a global computer network similar to the modern World Wide Web in a 1964 presentation for the BBC's Horizon programme, predicting that, by the 21st century, access to information and even physical tasks such as surgery could be accomplished remotely and instantaneously from anywhere in the world using internet and satellite communication.

In a 1974 interview with the Australian Broadcasting Corporation, the interviewer asked Clarke how he believed the computer would change the future for the everyday person, and what life would be like in the year 2001. Responding to a question about how the interviewer's son's life would be different, Clarke said: "He will have, in his own house, not a computer as big as this, [points to nearby computer], but at least, a console through which he can talk, through his friendly local computer and get all the information he needs, for his everyday life, like his bank statements, his theatre reservations, all the information you need in the course of living in our complex modern society, this will be in a compact form in his own house ... and he will take it as much for granted as we take the telephone."

== Geostationary communications satellite ==
Geostationary or Clarke orbit

Clarke contributed to the popularity of the idea that geostationary satellites would be ideal telecommunications relays. He first described this in a letter to the editor of Wireless World in February 1945 and elaborated on the concept in a paper titled Extra-Terrestrial Relays – Can Rocket Stations Give Worldwide Radio Coverage?, published in Wireless World in October 1945. The geostationary orbit is sometimes known as the Clarke orbit or the Clarke belt in his honour.

It is not clear that this article was actually the inspiration for the modern telecommunications satellite. According to John R. Pierce, of Bell Labs, who was involved in the Echo satellite and Telstar projects, he gave a talk upon the subject in 1954 (published in 1955), using ideas that were "in the air", but was not aware of Clarke's article at the time. In an interview given shortly before his death, Clarke was asked whether he had ever suspected that one day communications satellites would become so important; he replied: "I'm often asked why I didn't try to patent the idea of a communications satellite. My answer is always, 'A patent is really a licence to be sued.'"

Though different from Clarke's idea of telecom relay, the idea of communicating via satellites in geostationary orbit itself had been described earlier. For example, the concept of geostationary satellites was described in Hermann Oberth's 1923 book Die Rakete zu den Planetenräumen (The Rocket into Interplanetary Space), and then the idea of radio communication by means of those satellites in Herman Potočnik's (written under the pseudonym Hermann Noordung) 1928 book Das Problem der Befahrung des Weltraums), sections: Providing for Long Distance Communications and Safety, (Note: Full text: "Providing for Long Distance Communications and Safety". Archived from the original on 14 January 2009.) and (possibly referring to the idea of relaying messages via satellite, but not that three would be optimal) Observing and Researching the Earth's Surface, published in Berlin. (Note: Full text: "Observing and Researching the Earth's Surface". Archived from the original on 14 January 2009.) Clarke acknowledged the earlier concept in his book Profiles of the Future. (Note: "Intelsat, the International Telecommunications Satellite Organisation which operates the global system, has started calling it the Clarke orbit. Flattered though I am, honesty compels me to point out that the concept of such an orbit predates my 1945 paper 'Extra Terrestrial Relays' by at least twenty years. I didn't invent it, but only annexed it.")

== Undersea explorer ==
Clarke was an avid scuba diver and a member of the Underwater Explorers Club. In addition to writing, Clarke set up several diving-related ventures with his business partner Mike Wilson. In 1956, while scuba diving, Wilson and Clarke uncovered ruined masonry, architecture, and idol images of the sunken original Koneswaram temple – including carved columns with flower insignia, and stones in the form of elephant heads – spread on the shallow surrounding seabed. Other discoveries included Chola bronzes from the original shrine, and these discoveries were described in Clarke's 1957 book The Reefs of Taprobane.

In 1961, while filming off Great Basses Reef, Wilson found a wreck and retrieved silver coins. Plans to dive on the wreck the following year were stopped when Clarke developed paralysis, ultimately diagnosed as polio. A year later, Clarke observed the salvage from the shore and the surface. The ship, ultimately identified as belonging to the Mughal Emperor, Aurangzeb, yielded fused bags of silver rupees, cannon, and other artefacts, carefully documented, became the basis for The Treasure of the Great Reef. Living in Sri Lanka and learning its history also inspired the backdrop for his novel The Fountains of Paradise in which he described a space elevator. This, he believed, would make rocket-based access to space obsolete, and more than geostationary satellites, would ultimately be his scientific legacy. In 2008, he said in an interview with IEEE Spectrum, "maybe in a generation or so the space elevator will be considered equally important" as the geostationary satellite, which was his most important technological contribution.

== Views ==
=== Religion ===
Themes of religion and spirituality appear in much of Clarke's writing. He said: "Any path to knowledge is a path to God – or Reality, whichever word one prefers to use." He described himself as "fascinated by the concept of God". J. B. S. Haldane, near the end of his life, suggested in a personal letter to Clarke that Clarke should receive a prize in theology for being one of the few people to write anything new on the subject, and went on to say that if Clarke's writings had not contained multiple contradictory theological views, he might have been a menace. When he entered the Royal Air Force, Clarke insisted that his dog tags be marked "pantheist" rather than the default, Church of England, and in a 1991 essay entitled "Credo", described himself as a logical positivist from the age of 10. In 2000, Clarke told the Sri Lankan newspaper, The Island, "I don't believe in God or an afterlife", and he identified himself as an atheist. He was honoured as a Humanist Laureate in the International Academy of Humanism. He also described himself as a "crypto-Buddhist", insisting Buddhism is not a religion. He displayed little interest about religion early in his life, for example, only discovering a few months after marrying that his wife had strong Presbyterian beliefs.

Later in his life, Clarke began to hold a more hostile view of religion. A famous quotation of Clarke's is often cited: "One of the great tragedies of mankind is that morality has been hijacked by religion." He was quoted in Popular Science in 2004 as saying of religion: "Most malevolent and persistent of all mind viruses. We should get rid of it as quick as we can." In a three-day "dialogue on man and his world" with Alan Watts, Clarke said he was biased against religion and could not forgive religions for what he perceived as their inability to prevent atrocities and wars over time. In his introduction to the penultimate episode of Mysterious World, entitled "Strange Skies", Clarke said, "I sometimes think that the universe is a machine designed for the perpetual astonishment of astronomers", reflecting the dialogue of the episode, in which he stated this concept more broadly, referring to "mankind". Near the very end of that same episode, the last segment of which covered the Star of Bethlehem, he said his favourite theory was that it might be a pulsar. Given that pulsars were discovered in the interval between his writing the short story, "The Star" (1955), and making Mysterious World (1980), and given the more recent discovery of pulsar PSR B1913+16, he said: "How romantic, if even now, we can hear the dying voice of a star, which heralded the Christian era."

Despite his atheism, themes of deism are a common feature within Clarke's work. Clarke left written instructions for a funeral: "Absolutely no religious rites of any kind, relating to any religious faith, should be associated with my funeral."

=== Politics ===
Regarding freedom of information Clarke believed, "In the struggle for freedom of information, technology, not politics, will be the ultimate decider." Clarke also wrote, "It is not easy to see how the more extreme forms of nationalism can long survive when men have seen the Earth in its true perspective as a single small globe against the stars." Clarke opposed claims of sovereignty over space stating "There is hopeful symbolism in the fact that flags do not wave in a vacuum." Clarke was an anti-capitalist, stating that he did not fear automation because, "the goal of the future is full unemployment, so we can play. That's why we have to destroy the present politico-economic system."

=== Technology ===
Regarding human jobs being replaced by robots, Clarke said: "Any teacher that can be replaced by a machine should be!" Clarke supported the use of renewable energy, saying: "I would like to see us kick our current addiction to oil, and adopt clean energy sources ... Climate change has now added a new sense of urgency. Our civilisation depends on energy, but we can't allow oil and coal to slowly bake our planet."

=== Intelligent life ===
About intelligent life and the Fermi paradox, Clarke stated:

The best proof that there's intelligent life in outer space is the fact that it hasn't come here ... the fact that we have not yet found the slightest evidence for life—much less intelligence—beyond this Earth does not surprise or disappoint me in the least. Our technology must still be laughably primitive; we may well be like jungle savages listening for the throbbing of tom-toms, while the ether around them carries more words per second than they could utter in a lifetime. Two possibilities exist: either we are alone in the Universe or we are not... Both are equally terrifying.

=== Paranormal phenomena ===
Early in his career, Clarke had a fascination with the paranormal and said it was part of the inspiration for his novel Childhood's End. Citing the numerous promising paranormal claims that were later shown to be fraudulent, Clarke described his earlier openness to the paranormal having turned to being "an almost total sceptic" by the time of his 1992 biography. Similarly, in the prologue to the 1990 Del Rey edition of Childhood's End, he writes: "after ... researching my Mysterious World and Strange Powers programmes, I am an almost total skeptic. I have seen far too many claims dissolve into thin air, far too many demonstrations exposed as fakes. It has been a long, and sometimes embarrassing, learning process." During interviews, both in 1993 and 2004–2005, he stated that he did not believe in reincarnation, saying there was no mechanism to make it possible, though "I'm always paraphrasing J. B. S. Haldane: 'The universe is not only stranger than we imagine, it's stranger than we can imagine.'" He described the idea of reincarnation as fascinating, but favoured a finite existence.

Clarke was known for hosting several television series investigating the unusual: Arthur C. Clarke's Mysterious World (1980), Arthur C. Clarke's World of Strange Power (1985), and Arthur C. Clarke's Mysterious Universe (1994). Topics examined ranged from ancient, man-made artefacts with obscure origins (e.g., the Nazca lines or Stonehenge), to cryptids (purported animals unknown to science), or obsolete scientific theories that came to have alternate explanations (e.g., Martian canals).

In Arthur C. Clarke's Mysterious World, he describes three kinds of "mysteries":

- Mysteries of the First Kind: Something that was once utterly baffling but is now completely understood, e.g. a rainbow.
- Mysteries of the Second Kind: Something that is currently not fully understood and can be in the future.
- Mysteries of the Third Kind: Something of which we have no understanding.

== Themes, style and influences ==
Clarke's work is marked by an optimistic view of science empowering mankind's exploration of the Solar System and the world's oceans. His images of the future often feature a Utopian setting with highly developed technology, ecology, and society, based on the author's ideals. His early published stories usually featured the extrapolation of a technological innovation or scientific breakthrough into the underlying decadence of his own society.

A recurring theme in Clarke's works is the notion that the evolution of an intelligent species would eventually make them something close to gods. This was explored in his 1953 novel Childhood's End and briefly touched upon in his novel Imperial Earth. This idea of transcendence through evolution seems to have been influenced by Olaf Stapledon, who wrote a number of books dealing with this theme. Clarke has said of Stapledon's 1930 book Last and First Men that "No other book had a greater influence on my life ... [It] and its successor Star Maker (1937) are the twin summits of [Stapledon's] literary career."

Clarke was well known as an admirer of Irish fantasy writer Lord Dunsany, also having corresponded with him until Dunsany's death in 1957. He described Dunsany as "one of the greatest writers of the century". He also listed H. G. Wells, Jules Verne, and Edgar Rice Burroughs as influences.

== Awards, honours, and other recognition ==
Clarke won the 1963 Stuart Ballantine Medal from the Franklin Institute for the concept of satellite communications, and other honours. He won more than a dozen annual literary awards for particular works of science fiction.

- In 1952, Clarke won the International Fantasy Award's Non-Fiction category for The Exploration of Space.
- In 1956, Clarke won a Hugo Award for his short story, "The Star".
- Clarke won the UNESCO–Kalinga Prize for the Popularization of Science in 1961.
- He won the Stuart Ballantine Medal in 1963.
- He shared a 1969 Academy Award nomination with Stanley Kubrick in the category Best Writing, Story and Screenplay – Written Directly for the Screen for 2001: A Space Odyssey.
- The fame of 2001 was enough for the Command Module of the Apollo 13 spacecraft to be named "Odyssey".
- Clarke won the Nebula (1973) for his novella, A Meeting with Medusa.
- Clarke won both the Nebula (1973) and Hugo (1974) awards and the 1974 Jupiter Award for his novel, Rendezvous with Rama.
- Clarke won both the Nebula (1979) and Hugo (1980) awards for his novel, The Fountains of Paradise.
- In 1982, he won the Marconi Prize for innovation in communications and remote sensing in space.
- In 1985 the Science Fiction Writers of America named him its 7th SFWA Grand Master.
- In 1986, he was elected to the American National Academy of Engineering "For conception of geosynchronous communications satellites, and for other contributions to the use and understanding of space".
- In 1988, he was awarded an honorary degree (Doctor of Letters) by the University of Bath.
- Readers of the British monthly Interzone voted him the all-time second best science fiction author in 1988–1989.
- He received a CBE in 1989, and was knighted in 2000. Clarke's health did not allow him to travel to London to receive the latter honour personally from the Queen, so the United Kingdom's High Commissioner to Sri Lanka invested him as a Knight Bachelor at a ceremony in Colombo.
- In 1994, Clarke was nominated for a Nobel Peace Prize by law professor Glenn Reynolds.
- The Science Fiction and Fantasy Hall of Fame inducted Clarke in 1997, its second class of two deceased and two living persons. Among the living, Clarke and Andre Norton followed A. E. van Vogt and Jack Williamson.
- In 2000, he was named a Distinguished Supporter of the British Humanist Association.
- The 2001 Mars Odyssey orbiter is named in honour of Clarke's works.
- In 2003, Clarke was awarded the Telluride Tech Festival Award of Technology, where he appeared on stage via a 3-D hologram with a group of old friends including Jill Tarter, Neil Armstrong, Lewis Branscomb, Charles Townes, Freeman Dyson, Bruce Murray, and Scott Brown.
- In 2004, Clarke won the Heinlein Award for outstanding achievement in hard or science-oriented science fiction.
- On 14 November 2005 Sri Lanka awarded Clarke its highest civilian award, the Sri Lankabhimanya (The Pride of Sri Lanka), for his contributions to science and technology and his commitment to his adopted country.
- Clarke was the Honorary Board Chair of the Institute for Cooperation in Space, founded by Carol Rosin, and served on the Board of Governors of the American National Space Society, a space advocacy organisation founded by Wernher von Braun.

=== Named after Clarke ===
==== Awards ====
- Arthur C. Clarke Award for science fiction writing, awarded annually in the United Kingdom.

In 1986, Clarke provided a grant to fund the prize money (initially £1,000) for the Arthur C. Clarke Award for the best science fiction novel published in the United Kingdom in the previous year. In 2001 the prize was increased to £2001, and its value now matches the year (e.g., £2005 in 2005).

- In 2005 he lent his name to the inaugural Sir Arthur Clarke Award, for achievements in space, dubbed the "Space Oscars", awarded annually in the United Kingdom. His brother attended the awards ceremony, and presented an award specially chosen by Arthur (and not by the panel of judges who chose the other awards) to the British Interplanetary Society.
- Arthur C. Clarke Foundation awards: "Arthur C. Clarke Innovator's Award" and "Arthur C. Clarke Lifetime Achievement Award"
- The Sir Arthur C. Clarke Memorial Trophy Inter School Astronomy Quiz Competition, held in Sri Lanka every year and organised by the Astronomical Association of Ananda College, Colombo. The competition started in 2001 as "The Sir Arthur C. Clarke Trophy Inter School Astronomy Quiz Competition" and was renamed after his death.
- Arthur C. Clarke Award for Imagination in Service to Society

==== Other ====
- An asteroid was named in Clarke's honour, 4923 Clarke (the number was assigned prior to, and independently of, the name – 2001, however appropriate, was unavailable, having previously been assigned to Albert Einstein).
- A species of ceratopsian dinosaur, discovered in Inverloch in Australia, was named after Clarke, Serendipaceratops arthurcclarkei. The genus name may also be an allusion to his adopted country, Sri Lanka, one of whose former names is Serendib.
- The Learning Resource Centre at Richard Huish College, Taunton, which Clarke attended when it was Huish Grammar School, is named after him.
- Clarke was a distinguished vice-president of the H. G. Wells Society, being strongly influenced by Wells as a science fiction writer.
- Arthur C. Clarke Institute for Modern Technologies, one of the major research institutes in Sri Lanka, is named after him.
- The main protagonist of the Dead Space series of video games, Isaac Clarke, takes his surname from Arthur C. Clarke, and his given name from Clarke's friendly rival and associate Isaac Asimov.
- An outer-circular orbital beltway in Colombo, Sri Lanka, was named Arthur C. Clarke Expressway in honour of Clarke.
- 'The Clarke Event' is a proposed name for GRB 080319B, a gamma-ray burst detected just hours before Clarke's death which set a new record for the most intrinsically bright object ever observed by humans in the universe.
- Clarke Montes, a mountain on Pluto's moon Charon, is named after Clarke.

== Selected works ==
=== Novels ===
- Against the Fall of Night (1948, 1953), original version of The City and the Stars
- Prelude to Space (1951)
- The Sands of Mars (1951)
- Islands in the Sky (1952)
- Childhood's End (1953)
- Earthlight (1955)
- The City and the Stars (1956)
- The Deep Range (1957)
- A Fall of Moondust (1961)
- Dolphin Island: A Story of the People of the Sea (1963)
- Glide Path (1963)
- 2001: A Space Odyssey (1968), produced alongside the film version with Stanley Kubrick
- Rendezvous with Rama (1973)
- Imperial Earth (1975)
- The Fountains of Paradise (1979)
- 2010: Odyssey Two (1982)
- The Songs of Distant Earth (1986)
- 2061: Odyssey Three (1987)
- Cradle (1988) (with Gentry Lee)
- The Ghost from the Grand Banks (1990)
- The Hammer of God (1993)
- Richter 10 (1996) (with Mike McQuay)
- 3001: The Final Odyssey (1997)
- The Trigger (1999) (with Michael P. Kube-McDowell)
- The Light of Other Days (2000) (with Stephen Baxter)
- The Last Theorem (2008) (with Frederik Pohl)

=== Short stories and short story collections ===
- Travel by Wire! (1937)
- How We Went to Mars (1938)
- The Awakening (1942)
- Loophole (1946)
- Technical Error (1950)
- Expedition to Earth (1953)
- Reach for Tomorrow (1956)
- Tales from the White Hart (1957)
- The Other Side of the Sky (1958)
- Tales of Ten Worlds (1962)
- The Nine Billion Names of God (1967)
- Of Time and Stars (1972)
- The Wind from the Sun (1972)
- The Best of Arthur C. Clarke (1973)
- The Sentinel (1983)
- Tales From Planet Earth (1990)
- More Than One Universe (1991)
- The Collected Stories of Arthur C. Clarke (2001)

=== Non-fiction ===
- Interplanetary Flight: An Introduction to Astronautics (1950), London: Temple Press, ISBN 0-425-06448-4
- The Exploration of Space (1951), New York: Harper & Brothers
- The Exploration of the Moon (1954), with R. A. Smith, New York: Harper Brothers
- The Coast of Coral (1955), London: Frederick Muller
- Boy Beneath the Sea (1958), New York: Harper, ISBN 0060212667
- Voice Across the Sea (1958), New York: Harper
- Profiles of the Future: An Inquiry into the Limits of the Possible (1962), New York: Harper & Row
- The Treasure of the Great Reef (1964), with Mike Wilson, New York: Harper & Row
- Man and Space (1964), Life Science Library, New York: Time Life
- Voices from the Sky: Previews of the Coming Space Age (1965), New York: Harper & Row
- The Promise of Space (1968), New York: Harper & Row
- Mars and the Mind of Man (1971), New York: Harper & Row ISBN 978-0-06-010443-6
- Report on Planet Three and Other Speculations (1972), New York: Berkley, ISBN 0-425-07592-3
- The View from Serendip (1977), New York: Random House, ISBN 0-394-41796-8
- 1984: Spring / A Choice of Futures (1984), New York: Del Rey / Ballantine, ISBN 0-345-31357-7, collected non-fiction writings
- Astounding Days: A Science Fictional Autobiography (1989), London: Gollancz, ISBN 0-575-04446-2
- How the World Was One: Beyond the Global Village (1992), London: Gollancz, ISBN 0-575-05226-0
- Greetings, Carbon-Based Bipeds!: Collected Essays, 1934–1998 (1999), New York: St. Martin's Press, and London: Voyager

== Media appearances ==
- The City in the Image of Man: Ideas and Work of Paolo Soleri (1972)
- 2010: The Odyssey Continues (1984)
- The Day of Five Billion (1987)
- Without Warning (1994)
- Fractals: The colours of infinity (1995), narrated documentary
- Future Fantastic (BBC, 1996)
- Arthur C. Clarke: The Man Who Saw the Future (1997)
- Odyssey of Survival (1999)
- 2001: HAL's Legacy (2001)
- Stanley Kubrick: A Life in Pictures (2001)
- To Mars by A-Bomb: The Secret History of Project Orion (BBC, 2003)
- The Martians and Us (2006)
- Planetary Defense (2007)
- Vision of a Future Passed: The Prophecy of 2001 (2007)
