= Imperial Earth =

1975 novel by Arthur C. Clarke

- Cover of the first edition
- Author: Arthur C. Clarke
- Cover artist: Bruce Pennington
- Language: English
- Genre: Science fiction
- Publisher: Gollancz
- Publication date: 1975
- Publication place: United Kingdom
- Media type: Print (Hardback & Paperback)
- Pages: 287
- ISBN: 0-575-02011-3
- OCLC: 2966514
- Dewey Decimal: 823/.9/14
- LC Class: PZ3.C551205 Im PR6005.L36

Imperial Earth is a science fiction novel by British writer Sir Arthur C. Clarke, published in 1975 by Gollancz Books. The plot follows the protagonist, Duncan Makenzie, on a trip to Earth from his home on Titan, in large part as a diplomatic visit to the U.S. for its quincentennial in 2276, but also to have a clone of himself produced. The book was published in time for the U.S. bicentennial in 1976.

== Background ==
Although Imperial Earth was the second book in a lucrative three-novel contract for Clarke, it is a standalone novel.

== Plot summary ==
Duncan Makenzie is the latest generation of the 'first family' of Titan, a colonised moon of Saturn. Originally settled by his grandfather Malcolm Makenzie in the early 23rd century, Titan's economy has flourished based on the harvest and sale of hydrogen mined from the atmosphere, which is used to fuel the fusion engines of interplanetary spacecraft.

As the plot opens in 2276, a number of factors are combining to make a diplomatic visit to the 'mother world' of Earth a necessity. Firstly, the forthcoming 500th anniversary of US Independence, which is bringing in colonists from the entire Solar System, obviously needs a suitable representative from Titan. Secondly, the Makenzie family carry a fatal damaged gene that means any normal continuation of the family line is impossible—so both Duncan and his "father" Colin are clones of his "grandfather" Malcolm. Human cloning is a mature technology but is even at this time ethically controversial. And thirdly, technological advances in spacecraft drive systems — specifically the 'asymptotic drive' which improves the specific impulse and thrust by orders of magnitude — means that Titan's whole economy is under threat as the demand for hydrogen is about to collapse.

The human aspects of the tale center mainly on the intense infatuation (largely unrequited but not unconsummated) that the two main male characters, Duncan and Karl Helmer, develop for the vividly characterized Catherine Linden Ellerman (Calindy), a visitor to Titan from Earth in their youth, and its lifelong consequences.

A number of other sub-plots suggest some sort of greater mystery, but remain unexplored. The book ends with him returning home with his new "child" Malcolm (who is a clone of Karl Helmer, breaking tradition), leaving the other plot threads dangling.

== Editions ==
The original UK hardcover edition (ISBN 0-575-02011-3) has the subtitle "A Fantasy of Love and Discord" and has 38 chapters and "Acknowledgments and Notes". The later US hardcover edition adds a quote from Ernest Hemingway, has 43 chapters, drops the subtitle, and expands the Acknowledgements and Notes. The later US paperback edition also features an "Additional Note" about a possible biological error in the plot.

== Reception ==
A review in Library Journal noted the thin plot of the novel, but followed up by saying, "No one is complaining" due to Clarke's skill as a science fiction writer, and called it "an intriguing, thought-provoking book".

== See also ==
- Pentomino - A math game explained in the story
