= O'Toole (surname) =

Origin
- Language: Celtic languages: old Irish
- Derivation: Ó Tuathail
- Meaning: descendant of tuathal
- Region of origin: Leinster, Ulster

Other names
- Variant forms: Toole, Toal, MacToole, McToole

O'Toole is a surname of Irish origin. It is an anglicized form of the Gaelic Ó Tuathail meaning "descendant of Tuathal", composed of tuath "the people" and gal "mighty". The O'Toole family were a leading clan in Gaelic Leinster and Ulster.

== Notable people ==
- Adam Dubh Ó Tuathail, Irish heretic, executed 1328
- Annette O'Toole (b. 1952), American dancer and actress
- Anton O'Toole, Irish footballer
- Chauncey O'Toole (b. 1986), Canadian rugby player
- Donald L. O'Toole (1902–1964), American politician from New York
- Edmund O'Toole, soldier won the Victoria Cross in the Anglo-Zulu war
- Erin O'Toole (b. 1973), Canadian politician
- Fintan O'Toole (b. 1958), columnist and drama critic for The Irish Times
- Gary O'Toole, Irish Olympic Swimmer
- James O'Toole (American politician) (b. 1958)
- James O'Toole (disambiguation), several people
- Jim O'Toole. American baseball player
- Joe O'Toole, Irish politician
- John O'Toole, politician in Ontario, Canada
- John-Joe O'Toole (b. 1988), Irish footballer
- Kathleen O'Toole (b. 1954), former police commissioner of Boston, Massachusetts
- Kevin F. O'Toole (1950), American lawyer, attorney and gaming regulator
- Kevin J. O'Toole (b. 1964), American Republican Party politician
- Kevin O'Toole (bodybuilder), Canadian bodybuilder and mixed martial artist
- Lorcán Ua Tuathail (1128–1180), Archbishop of Dublin and Saint
- Mark O'Toole (disambiguation), several people
- Matt O'Toole, TV actor
- Maureen O'Toole (b. 1961), American water polo player and coach
- Mick O'Toole (1931–2018), Irish racehorse trainer
- Mor Ui Thuathail (c. 1114–1191), Queen of Leinster
- Muirchertach Ua Tuathail (fl. 1114) King of Ui Muirdeaigh, father-in-law of Diarmait Mac Murchada
- Paddy O'Toole (1938–2025), Irish politician
- Pat O'Toole, Canadian lacrosse player
- Peter O'Toole (1932–2013), Irish actor
- Randal O'Toole, American economist and public policy expert
- Rich O'Toole, American singer-songwriter
- Tara O'Toole Under Secretary of Homeland Security for Science and Technology 2009-2013
- Tom O'Toole (disambiguation), several people

== Fictional characters ==
- Plenty O'Toole, in the 1971 James Bond film Diamonds Are Forever
- JD O'Toole, in Grand Theft Auto: Liberty City Stories
- Michael O'Toole, in Arthur C. Clarke and Gentry Lee's novels Rama II, The Garden of Rama, and Rama Revealed
- Timmy O'Toole, a fictional character created by Bart Simpson in his practical joke involving a walkie-talkie at the bottom of a well, in The Simpsons episode "Radio Bart".
- Sneakers O'Toole, who appears briefly in Family Guy episode "Boys Do Cry".

== See also ==
- Tohill
- Toal (disambiguation)
- O'Toole (disambiguation)
