= Arthur C. Clarke in media =

In his lifetime Arthur C. Clarke participated in film, television, radio and other media in a number of different ways.

(Note: in media, in this article, does not include his published writings.)

== In film ==
=== Screenplay author ===
Clarke is most famously known as co-author, along with Stanley Kubrick, of the screenplay for the film 2001: A Space Odyssey (1968), widely considered to be one of the most influential films of all time.

==== 2001: A Space Odyssey ====
Clarke's venture into film was the Stanley Kubrick directed 2001: A Space Odyssey. Kubrick and Clarke had met in New York City in 1964 to discuss the possibility of a collaborative film project. As the idea developed, they decided to loosely base the story on Clarke's short story, The Sentinel, written in 1948. Originally, Clarke was going to write the screenplay for the film, but Kubrick suggested during one of their brainstorming meetings that before beginning on the actual script, they should let their imaginations soar free by writing a novel first, on which they would base the film. (See: 2001: A Space Odyssey.) "This is more or less the way it worked out, though toward the end, novel and screenplay were being written simultaneously, with feedback in both directions. Thus I rewrote some sections after seeing the movie rushes—a rather expensive method of literary creation, which few other authors can have enjoyed." The novel ended up being published a few months after the release of the movie.

Due to the hectic schedule of the film's production, Kubrick and Clarke had difficulty collaborating on the book. Clarke completed a draft of the novel at the end of 1964 with the plan to publish in 1965 in advance of the film's release in 1966. After many delays the film was released in the spring of 1968, before the book was completed. The book was credited to Clarke alone. Clarke later complained that this had the effect of making the book into a novelisation, that Kubrick had manipulated circumstances to downplay Clarke's authorship. For these and other reasons, the details of the story differ slightly from the book to the movie. The film contains little explanation for the events taking place. Clarke, on the other hand, wrote thorough explanations of "cause and effect" for the events in the novel. James Randi later recounted that upon seeing the premiere of 2001 for the first time, Clarke left the theatre in tears, at the intermission, after having watched an eleven-minute scene (which did not make it into general release) where an astronaut is doing nothing more than jogging inside the spaceship, which was Kubrick's idea of showing the audience how boring space travels could be.

Clarke shared a 1969 Academy Award nomination with Stanley Kubrick in the category Best Writing, Story and Screenplay – Written Directly for the Screen for 2001: A Space Odyssey.

In 1972, Clarke published The Lost Worlds of 2001, which included his accounts of the production, and alternate versions, of key scenes. The "special edition" of the novel A Space Odyssey (released in 1999) contains an introduction by Clarke in which he documents the events leading to the release of the novel and film.

==== 2010: The Year We Make Contact ====
In 1982 Clarke continued the 2001 epic with a sequel, 2010: Odyssey Two. This novel was also made into a film, 2010, directed by Peter Hyams for release in 1984. Because of the political environment in America in the 1980s, the film presents a Cold War theme, with the looming tensions of nuclear warfare not featured in the novel. The film was not considered to be as revolutionary or artistic as 2001, but the reviews were still positive.

Clarke's email correspondence with Hyams was published in 1984. Titled The Odyssey File: The Making of 2010, and co-authored with Hyams, it illustrates his fascination with the then-pioneering medium of email and its use for them to communicate on an almost daily basis at the time of planning and production of the film while living on opposite sides of the world. The book also included Clarke's personal list of the best science-fiction films ever made.

Clarke also appeared in the film himself (see below).

==== Rendezvous with Rama ====
Clarke's award-winning novel Rendezvous with Rama (1972) was optioned for filmmaking decades ago, but this motion picture is in "development hell" as of 2012. In the early 2000s, the actor Morgan Freeman expressed his desire to produce a movie based on Rendezvous with Rama. After a drawn-out development process – which Freeman attributed to difficulties in getting financing – it appeared that in 2003 this project might be proceeding, but this is very dubious. The film was to be produced by Freeman's production company, Revelations Entertainment, and David Fincher has been touted on Revelations' Rama web page as far back as 2001 as the film's director. After years of no progress, Fincher stated in an interview in late 2007 (in which he also credited the novel as being influential on the films Alien and Star Trek: The Motion Picture) that he is still attached to helm. Revelations indicated that Stel Pavlou had written the adaptation.

In late 2008, Fincher stated the movie is unlikely to be made. "It looks like it's not going to happen. There's no script and as you know, Morgan Freeman's not in the best of health right now. We've been trying to do it but it's probably not going to happen." However, in 2010 it was announced that the film was still planned for future production and both Freeman and Fincher mentioned it as still needing a worthy script.

=== Other ===
The 1998 film Deep Impact originated as a joint adaptation of Clarke's 1993 novel The Hammer of God and remake of the 1951 film When Worlds Collide, and the project was originally acknowledged as such, although the finished film did not acknowledge any of its sources as it was judged as being different enough to not require it.

=== Appearances ===
Clarke appeared in 2010, first as the man feeding the pigeons while Dr. Heywood Floyd is engaged in a conversation in front of the White House. Later, in the hospital scene with David Bowman's mother, an image of the cover of Time portrays Clarke as the American President and Kubrick as the Soviet Premier.

In 1994, Clarke appeared in a science fiction film; he portrayed himself in the telefilm Without Warning, an American production about an apocalyptic alien first contact scenario presented in the form of a faux newscast.

== In television ==
=== Series host ===
In the 1980s Clarke became well known to many for his television programmes investigating paranormal phenomena Arthur C. Clarke's Mysterious World (1980), Arthur C. Clarke's World of Strange Powers (1985) and Arthur C. Clarke's Mysterious Universe (1994), enough to be parodied in an episode of The Goodies in which his show is cancelled after it is claimed he does not exist.

=== TV commentator ===
Following the 1968 release of 2001, Clarke became much in demand as a commentator on science and technology, especially at the time of the Apollo space program. The fame of 2001 was enough to get the Command Module of the Apollo 13 craft named "Odyssey".

In 1988, Stephen Hawking, Arthur C. Clarke and Carl Sagan were interviewed in God, the Universe and Everything Else. They discuss the Big Bang theory, God and the possibility of extraterrestrial life.

=== Television adaptations ===
The first of Clarke's works to be adapted for television was "All The Time In The World" which he adapted himself as an episode of the American Tales of Tomorrow series in 1952.

Clarke's short story "The Star" was adapted for television in 1985 as a segment of the revival of The Twilight Zone.

Clarke's short story "Breaking Strain" was adapted as the 1995 TV movie Trapped In Space.

The 2002 Futurama episode "Godfellas" was partially inspired by Clarke's short story "The Nine Billion Names of God".

In 2013, the SyFy Channel announced they were producing a six-hour miniseries of Clarke's novel Childhood's End, which aired in 2015.

== In radio ==
In a 1974 taped interview with the Australian Broadcasting Corporation, the interviewer asked Clarke how he believed the computer would change the future for the everyday person, and what life would be like around the year 2001. Clarke accurately predicted many things that became reality—including online banking, online shopping, and other now commonplace things. Responding to a question about how the interviewer's son's life would be different, Clark responded: "[H]e will have, in his own house, not a computer as big as this, [points to nearby computer], but at least, a console through which he can talk, through his local computer and get all the information he needs, for his everyday life, like his bank statements, his theater reservations, all the information you need in the course of living in our complex modern society, this will be in a compact form in his own house ... and he will take it as much for granted as we take the telephone."

BBC Radio adaptations of Clarke's novels Childhood's End and Rendezvous With Rama were produced in 1997 and 2009 respectively.

== In video ==
In September 2007, he provided a video greeting for NASA's Cassini probe's flyby of Iapetus (which plays an important role in 2001: A Space Odyssey). In December 2007 on his 90th birthday, Clarke recorded a video message to his friends and fans bidding them good-bye.

== In music ==
In 1994 Mike Oldfield recorded an album called The Songs of Distant Earth, based on Clarke's novel of the same name.

== In games ==
In 1984 a text adventure computer game with pictures, based on Clarke's 1973 novel Rendezvous with Rama, was made by Trillium (later known as Telarium). Despite its primitive graphics, it had highly detailed descriptions, and it followed the book very closely along with having puzzles to solve during the game.

In 1996 Rama was created, a point and click adventure game in the style of Myst, by Sierra Entertainment. Along with highly detailed graphics, Arthur C. Clarke also appeared in the game as the guide for the player. This game featured characters from the sequel book Rama II.

The main protagonist of the Dead Space series of video games, Isaac Clarke, takes his surname from Arthur C. Clarke, and his given name from Clarke's friendly rival and associate, Isaac Asimov.
