= List of Pacific Blue episodes =

Pacific Blue is an American crime drama series about a team of police officers with the Santa Monica Police Department who patrolled its beaches on bicycles. The show ran for five seasons on the USA Network, from March 2, 1996, to April 9, 2000, with a total of 101 episodes.

== Series overview ==
Season	Episodes	Originally released	
Season	Episodes	First released	Last released
1	13	March 2, 1996	May 25, 1996
2	22	August 17, 1996	April 20, 1997
3	22	August 3, 1997	April 19, 1998
4	22	July 26, 1998	April 25, 1999
5	22	July 18, 1999	April 9, 2000

== Episodes ==
=== Season 1 (1996) ===
No. overall	No. in season	Title	Directed by	Written by	Original release date	Prod. code
1	1	"Pilot"	Ralph Hemecker	Bill Nuss	March 2, 1996	10–101
2	2	"First Shoot"	Michael Alan Levine	Bill Nuss	March 9, 1996	10–105
3	3	"No Man's Land"	Michael Alan Levine	Bill Nuss; Thomas E Szollosi	March 16, 1996	10–104
4	4	"Over the Edge"	Corey Michael Eubanks	Bill Nuss, Steven Long Mitchell; Craig W Van Sickle	March 23, 1996	10–103
5	5	"Out of the Past"	Terrence O'Hara	Bill Nuss, Steven Long Mitchell; Craig W Van Sickle	March 30, 1996	10–108
6	6	"Takedown"	Terrence O'Hara	Bill Nuss, Steven Long Mitchell; Craig W Van Sickle	April 6, 1996	10–106
7	7	"Heatwave"	Lyndon Chubbuck	Bill Nuss, Steven Long Mitchell; Craig W Van Sickle	April 13, 1996	10–102
8	8	"Burnout"	Lyndon Chubbuck	Bill Nuss, Terri Treas, Michael Zand	April 20, 1996	10–107
9	9	"Moving Target"	Micky Dolenz	Bill Nuss	April 27, 1996	10–110
10	10	"Captive Audience"	Terrence O'Hara	Bill Nuss, Terri Treas, Michael Zand	May 4, 1996	10–111
11	11	"The Phoenix"	Charles Siebert	Bill Nuss, Steven Long Mitchell; Craig W Van Sickle	May 11, 1996	10–109
12	12	"The Big Spin"	Terrence O'Hara	Bill Nuss, Richard C Okie	May 18, 1996	10–112
13	13	"All Jammed Up"	Ronald Victor Garcia	Bill Nuss, Terri Treas, Michael Zand	May 25, 1996	10–113

=== Season 2 (1996–97) ===
No. overall	No. in season	Title	Directed by	Written by	Original release date	Prod. code
14	1	"Lights Out"	Terrence O'Hara	Bill Nuss	August 17, 1996	10–201
15	2	"The Daystalker"	Don Michael Paul	Terri Treas & Michael Zand	August 24, 1996	10–202
16	3	"Rapscallions"	Gary Winter	Greg Strangis	September 7, 1996	10–203
17	4	"Bangers"	Charles Siebert	Terri Treas & Michael Zand	September 14, 1996	10–204
18	5	"Point Blank"	Michael Alan Levine	David Ehrman	September 21, 1996	10–205
19	6	"The Enemy Within"	Stephen L. Posey	Donald Marcus	September 28, 1996	10–206
20	7	"Line in the Sand"	Michael Alan Levine	Doug Heyes Jr.	October 6, 1996	10–207
21	8	"Undercover"	Terence H. Winkless	Donald Marcus	October 13, 1996	10–208
22	9	"Genuine Heroes"	Terrence O'Hara	Bill Nuss	October 20, 1996	10–209
23	10	"Cranked Up"	Corey Michael Eubanks	Terri Treas & Michael Zand	November 3, 1996	10–211
24	11	"Deja Vu"	Michael Alan Levine	Greg Strangis & Robert McCullough	November 10, 1996	10–210
25	12	"Wheels of Fire"	Gary Winter	Story by : Gerry Conway; Teleplay by : Doug Heyes Jr.	November 17, 1996	10–212
26	13	"Outlaw Extreme"	Michael Alan Levine	Terri Treas & Michael Zand	December 8, 1996	10–213
27	14	"One Kiss Goodbye"	Sara Rose	Donald Marcus	December 15, 1996	10–214
28	15	"Black Pearl"	Terence H. Winkless	Terri Treas & Michael Zand	January 5, 1997	10–215
29	16	"Soft Targets"	Ron Satlof	Doug Heyes Jr.	January 12, 1997	10–216
30	17	"Runaway"	Charles Siebert	Story by : Greg O’Neill & Deborah Wakeham; Teleplay by : Greg O’Neill & Deborah Wakeham & Terri Treas & Michael Zand	January 19, 1997	10–217
31	18	"Full Moon"	Scott Lautanen	Robert Earll & Richard C. Okie	February 23, 1997	10–218
32	19	"Lost and Found"	Michael Alan Levine	Donald Marcus	March 2, 1997	10–219
33	20	"Bad Company"	Corey Michael Eubanks	Doug Heyes Jr.	April 6, 1997	10–220
34	21	"The Last Ride"	Michael Alan Levine	Terri Treas & Michael Zand	April 13, 1997	10–221
35	22	"Rumplestiltskin"	John B. Moranville	Donald Marcus	April 20, 1997	10–222

=== Season 3 (1997–98) ===
No. overall	No. in season	Title	Directed by	Written by	Original release date	Prod. code
36	1	"Inside Straight"	Michael Alan Levine	Bill Nuss	August 3, 1997	10–301
37	2	"Ties that Bind"	Sara Rose	Emily Skopov	August 10, 1997	10–302
38	3	"Rave On"	Michael Alan Levine	David Kemper	August 17, 1997	10–303
39	4	"Blood for Blood"	Gary Winter	Terry D. Nelson	August 24, 1997	10–304
40	5	"Excessive Force"	Michael Alan Levine	Michael Sloane	September 7, 1997	10–305
41	6	"Sandman"	Terence H. Winkless	Doug Heyes Jr.	September 21, 1997	10–306
42	7	"Repeat Offender"	Charles Siebert	David Kemper	September 28, 1997	10–307
43	8	"Matters of the Heart"	Terence H. Winkless	Emily Skopov	October 5, 1997	10–308
44	9	"Cop in a Box"	Scott Lautanen	William Bigelow	November 2, 1997	10–310
45	10	"Only in America"	Charles Siebert	William T. Conway	November 9, 1997	10–309
46	11	"Soul Mate"	Sara Rose	Terry D. Nelson	November 30, 1997	10–311
47	12	"Sisters"	John Paragon	David Ehrman	December 7, 1997	10–312
48	13	"Avenging Angels"	Terence H. Winkless	David Kemper	December 14, 1997	10–313
49	14	"With this Ring"	Michael Alan Levine	Emily Skopov	December 21, 1997	10–314
50	15	"Heartbeat"	Terence H. Winkless	Doug Heyes Jr.	January 4, 1998	10–315
51	16	"Armed and Dangerous"	Michael Alan Levine	Story by : Terri Treas & Michael Zand; Teleplay by : David Kemper & Emily Skopov	January 11, 1998	10–317
52	17	"Double Lives"	Scott Lautanen	Donald Marcus	January 18, 1998	10–318
53	18	"Caretakers"	Sara Rose	Hannah Louise Shearer	March 8, 1998	10–316
54	19	"House Party"	Michael Alan Levine	David Kemper	March 15, 1998	10–319
55	20	"Heat of the Moment"	Terence H. Winkless	Jill Donner	March 22, 1998	10–320
56	21	"Till Death Do Us Part"	Michael Alan Levine	David Kemper & Emily Skopov	April 12, 1998	10–321
57	22	"Best Laid Plans"	John B. Moranville	David Kemper & Emily Skopov	April 19, 1998	10–322

=== Season 4 (1998–99) ===
No. overall	No. in season	Title	Directed by	Written by	Original release date	Prod. code
58	1	"Glass Houses"	Michael Alan Levine	David Kemper	July 26, 1998	10–401
59	2	"Treasure Hunt"	Terence H. Winkless	Emily Skopov	August 2, 1998	10–402
60	3	"Seduced"	Terence H. Winkless	Jill Donner	August 9, 1998	10–404
61	4	"Users"	Michael Alan Levine	Tracey Stern	August 16, 1998	10–403
62	5	"Overkill"	Sara Rose	Paul Brown	August 23, 1998	10–405
63	6	"Silver Dollar"	Scott Lautanen	Doug Heyes Jr.	August 30, 1998	10–406
64	7	"Damaged Goods"	Michael Alan Levine	Emily Skopov	October 4, 1998	10–407
65	8	"Heat in the Hole"	Terence H. Winkless	Terri Treas & Michael Zand	October 11, 1998	10–412
66	9	"Cutting Edge"	Terence H. Winkless	Richard C. Okie	October 18, 1998	10–408
67	10	"Thrill Week"	Sara Rose	Doug Heyes Jr.	November 29, 1998	10–410
68	11	"Broken Dreams"	Scott Lautanen	Paul Brown	December 6, 1998	10–411
69	12	"Cruz Control"	Michael Alan Levine	Rich Hosek & Arnold Rudnick	December 13, 1998	10–409
70	13	"Save Serenity"	Michael Alan Levine	Paul Brown	January 10, 1999	10–415
71	14	"Infierno"	Sara Rose	Donald Marcus	January 17, 1999	10–416
72	15	"Stargazer"	Sara Rose	Doug Heyes Jr.	January 24, 1999	10–418
73	16	"Juvies"	James F. Davidson	Richard C. Okie	February 28, 1999	10–417
74	17	"Scarlet Rose"	Paul Brown	Paul Brown	March 7, 1999	10–419
75	18	"Thicker Than Water"	Scott Lautanen	Emily Skopov	March 21, 1999	10–414
76	19	"Near Death"	Gary Winter	Jim Korris	April 4, 1999	10–413
77	20	"Trust"	Terence H. Winkless	Richard C. Okie	April 11, 1999	10–420
78	21	"Lucky 13"	Emily Skopov	Emily Skopov	April 18, 1999	10–421
79	22	"The Right Thing: Part 1"	John B. Moranville	Richard C. Okie	April 25, 1999	10–422

=== Season 5 (1999–2000) ===
No. overall	No. in season	Title	Directed by	Written by	Original release date	Prod. code
80	1	"Reckoning: Part 2"	Terence H. Winkless	Richard C. Okie	July 18, 1999	10–501
81	2	"Naked Truth"	Sara Rose	Cyrus Nowrasteh	July 25, 1999	10–504
82	3	"Blue Hawaii: Part 1"	Michael Alan Levine	Story by : Bill Nuss & Richard C. Okie; Teleplay by : Richard C. Okie	August 1, 1999	10–502
83	4	"Blue Hawaii: Part 2"	Michael Alan Levine	Story by : Bill Nuss & Richard C. Okie; Teleplay by : Richard C. Okie	August 8, 1999	10–503
84	5	"Silicone Valley of the Dolls"	Terence H. Winkless	Raly Radouloff	August 15, 1999	10–505
85	6	"Hostile Witness"	Michael Alan Levine	Donald Marcus	August 22, 1999	10–506
86	7	"Dead Ringers"	Terence H. Winkless	Richard C. Okie	August 29, 1999	10–507
87	8	"Just a Gigolo"	Scott Lautanen	Paul Margolis	October 3, 1999	10–508
88	9	"Big Girls Don't Cry"	Terence H. Winkless	Emily Skopov	October 10, 1999	10–510
89	10	"Gaslight"	Scott Lautanen	Cyrus Nowrasteh	October 17, 1999	10–511
90	11	"Ghost Town"	Paul Brown	Paul Brown	October 31, 1999	10–512
91	12	"God's Gift"	Sara Rose	Paul Brown	December 5, 1999	10–509
92	13	"Swimming in the Dead Pool"	Gary Winter	Julie Beers	December 19, 1999	10–513
93	14	"Double Vision"	Michael Alan Levine	Paul Margolis	February 6, 2000	10–516
94	15	"Kangaroo Court"	Michael Alan Levine	Denetria Harris-Lawrence	February 13, 2000	10–514
95	16	"A Thousand Words"	Jim Davidson	Emily Skopov	February 20, 2000	10–515
96	17	"Fifty-Nine Minutes"	Terence H. Winkless	Richard C. Okie	February 27, 2000	10–517
97	18	"Disrobed"	Michael Alan Levine	Doug Heyes Jr.	March 5, 2000	10–521
98	19	"Betrayal"	Jim Davidson	Jordon Flick	March 12, 2000	10–518
99	20	"Kidnapped"	David Barrett	Paul Margolis	March 19, 2000	10–519
100	21	"Blind Eye"	Emily Skopov	Emily Skopov	April 2, 2000	10–520
101	22	"S.N.A.F.U."	John B. Moranville	Richard C. Okie	April 9, 2000	10–522
