= Starman (2025 film) =

2025 American documentary film

- Directed by: Robert Stone
- Written by: Robert Stone
- Produced by: Robert Stone; Ray Rothrock; Keith Haviland
- Starring: Gentry Lee
- Cinematography: Tom Hurwitz
- Edited by: Lindy Jankura; Robert Stone
- Music by: Gary Lionelli
- Production company: Robert Stone Productions
- Distributed by: Obscured Releasing
- Release dates: March 8, 2025 (SXSW); February 6, 2026 (United States)
- Running time: 85 minutes
- Country: United States
- Language: English

Starman is a 2025 American documentary film written and directed by Robert Stone. The film profiles Gentry Lee, an engineer at NASA's Jet Propulsion Laboratory and science fiction author, examining his career in planetary exploration and his views on the possibility of extraterrestrial life.

The film had its world premiere at the 2025 South by Southwest Film & TV Festival in the Documentary Spotlight section. It later screened at the Seattle International Film Festival, DocLands Documentary Film Festival, and Sitges Film Festival. Obscured Releasing acquired North American distribution rights in January 2026 and released the film theatrically in the United States on February 6, 2026.

== Synopsis ==
The film follows Gentry Lee's career in planetary exploration and his longstanding interest in whether life exists elsewhere in the universe. Lee worked on several NASA missions, including the Viking missions to Mars, the Galileo mission to Jupiter, the Stardust and Deep Impact comet missions, and the Mars Exploration Rovers.

Outside his engineering career, Lee collaborated with Carl Sagan on the 1980 television series Cosmos and co-authored several science fiction novels with Arthur C. Clarke, including Cradle and Rama II.

Stone centers the film on Lee, who speaks directly to the camera about his experiences and ideas. His account is interspersed with archival footage from the American space program as the film examines the development of space exploration and Lee's conclusions about humanity's place in the universe.

== Production ==
The project originated with producer Ray Rothrock, who conceived the film and approached Robert Stone to direct. Stone also wrote and produced the film, with Rothrock and Keith Haviland serving as producers and Shelby Stone as executive producer.

Tom Hurwitz served as cinematographer, while Lindy Jankura and Stone edited the film. Gary Lionelli composed the score.

Stone had previously directed Chasing the Moon (2019), a six-hour documentary series about the history of the American space program produced for PBS's American Experience.

== Release ==
Starman had its world premiere on March 8, 2025, at the SXSW Film & TV Festival, where it screened in the Documentary Spotlight section. It subsequently screened at the Seattle International Film Festival, DocLands Documentary Film Festival, and the Sitges Film Festival.

In January 2026, Obscured Releasing acquired North American distribution rights to the film. It received a limited theatrical release in the United States beginning February 6, 2026, as part of a theatrical tour that included appearances and Q&As with Stone and Lee. The film was released on video-on-demand platforms in March 2026.

== Reception ==
Owen Gleiberman of Variety reviewed the film positively following its SXSW premiere, describing it as an "intergalactic meditation as blissed-out mind-bender". He praised the film's ability to evoke a sense of wonder about space exploration and compared it thematically with Stone's earlier documentary series Chasing the Moon.

Daniel Fienberg of The Hollywood Reporter offered a more measured assessment. He observed that the film's single-subject structure and philosophical focus made it less sensational than other space-related documentaries premiering at SXSW that year, but found its smaller-scale and more personal approach more lasting.

Glenn Kenny of The New York Times also reviewed the film positively ahead of its U.S. theatrical release. He noted that spending the film in Lee's company makes Lee's optimism about exploration and extraterrestrial life increasingly persuasive, characterizing the documentary as a hopeful argument for scientific possibility.
