= Jim Ishida =

American actor (b. 1943)

James Ishida
- Born: James Susumu Ishida; July 29, 1943 (age 82); Stockton, California, U.S.
- Occupation: Actor
- Years active: 1969–2006
- Spouse: Margaret Ishida

James Susumu Ishida (born July 29, 1943) is an American retired actor.

== Early life ==
Ishida was born in Stockton, California, the son of Japanese American parents James Takeshi Ishida (May 19, 1917 – January 24, 1980) and the late Sachiko "Sue" Ishida (May 31, 1920 – August 25, 2010). Ishida, who was also raised in the nearby town of Lodi, and his family were internees at a Japanese American internment camp in Rohwer, Arkansas for about a year during World War II, then released shortly after the conflict ended in 1945. Ishida's mother Sue served for many years in the Lodi Unified School District as a teacher, librarian, and culminating and as the Coordinator of the Instructional Materials Center there in 1982.

He studied acting under Stella Adler, Darryl Hickman, Milton Katselas, and Lilyan Chauvin.

== Career ==
Ishida portrayed T. Fujitsu, Marty McFly's boss in 2015 in Back to the Future Part II in 1989, and his most recent role was in 2005, when he had a part in the television movie Reading Room. Ishida had a recurring role on DYNASTY, as Alexis Colby Dexter’s butler. He has had guest parts in such TV shows as Nurses (1992), Baywatch (1992), Knots Landing (1989), The A-Team (1986), Trapper John, M.D. (1984), and The Rockford Files (1977). Ishida got his start in television in appearances on the hit CBS-TV show Hawaii Five-O, appearing in three episodes in different parts from 1973 to 1975. Ishida also appeared in a part as a Bali Majestic Guest in the Ken Kwapis directed film Dunston Checks In in 1996.

On stage, Ishida was a member of the East West Players, appearing in productions of Philip Kan Gotanda's The Dream of Kitamura (winning a Drama-Logue Award), Wakako Yamauchi's Not a Through Street, a Hawaiian-set reinterpretation of Twelfth Night, and the musical Pacific Overtures. He co-starred, opposite John Goodman, in War Babies at the La Jolla Playhouse and in Lisa Loomer's The Waiting Room at the Mark Taper Forum.

== Filmography ==
=== Film ===
Year	Title	Role	Notes
1976	Midway	Pilot Lieutenant Takeo Koda	Uncredited
1983	Hansel and Gretel	Father	
1983	Deal of the Century	Masaggi's Aide #1	
1986	Deadly Friend	Coroner	
1989	The Iron Triangle	Khoi	
1989	Kinjite: Forbidden Subjects	Nakata	
1989	Black Rain	Osaka Escort Officer	
1989	Back to the Future Part II	Fujitsu	
1990	Predator 2	Reporter #5	
1991	Driving Me Crazy	Nissan Boss	
1991	Showdown in Little Tokyo	Asian Cop #2	
1991	Cold Heaven	Dr. Tanaki	
1991	Ricochet	Reporter #4	
1991	Strawberry Road	Pete	
1992	CIA Code Name: Alexa	Guest	
1994	The Next Karate Kid	Tall Monk	
1995	Strange Days	Mr. Fumitsu	
1995	Showgirls	Mr. Okida	
1996	Dunston Checks In	Bali Majestic Guest	
1996	The Silencers	Senator Furiyo	
1998	Armageddon	Client #3	
1999	Godzilla 2000	General Takada	Voice
2000	Stanley's Gig	Byron Fujisaki	
2002	Real Women Have Curves	Landlord	
2004	The Terminal	Yoshinoya Manager	
2006	Sweet and Sour	Lea's Dad	

=== Video games ===
- RAMA (1996), based on the books of Arthur C. Clarke and Gentry Lee. Ishida played the role of Shigeru Takagishi.
