= Rama II (disambiguation) =

Rama II may refer to

- Rama II (1767-1824), a monarch of Siam (Thailand)
- Rama II (novel) by Arthur C. Clarke and Gentry Lee
