= James O'Toole =

James O'Toole may refer to:

- James O'Toole (business figure), pioneer of the internet and internet marketing in Australia,
- James O'Toole (American politician) (born 1958), politician in the Missouri House of Representatives
- James O'Toole (reporter), American journalist
- James O'Toole (mobster) (1929–1973), Irish-American criminal
- James O'Toole (Irish politician) (died 1969), Irish Fianna Fáil politician

== See also ==
- Jim O'Toole (1937–2015), American baseball player
