= Amy Hunter (actress) =

American actress and model

- Born: May 6, 1966 (age 60); Boston, Massachusetts, U.S.
- Other name: Amy Hunter Cornelius
- Occupations: Actress, model
- Years active: 1989–present
- Spouse: Tony Cornelius (m. 1997; div. 2021)
- Children: 1

Amy Hunter (born May 6, 1966) is an American actress and model. She has had roles on a number of television series and daytime soaps. She co-hosted The Comedy Channel's Night After Night, and went on location for ESPN's Women in Sports.

Hunter was a special guest host on Soul Train, the weekly series where she met her husband, Tony Cornelius, son of creator-producer Don Cornelius. They had a daughter, Christina Marie, and later divorced.

Her theater work includes the starring role of Maria in West Side Story, Beneathea in A Raisin in the Sun, and the green-eyed sister in Words of Women.

Hunter's twelve years of experience in modeling took her to New York City and all over Europe. She also appeared in a number of commercials, including for Miller, Chevrolet and Reebok.

== Filmography ==
=== Film ===
Year	Title	Role	Notes
1994	Schemes	Receptionist	Video
2001	Two Can Play That Game	Nita	
2002	The Scorpion King	Warrior Woman	
2007	Kujo, My Love	Mallory	Short film
2007	The Kingdom	Lyla Fleury	
2007	Traci Townsend	Vick	
2007	This Christmas	Karen	
2017	'Til Death Do Us Part	Brenda	

=== Television ===
Year	Title	Role	Notes
1989	The Cosby Show	Amy	Episode: "The Lost Weekend"
1994	The Sinbad Show		Episode: "David Goes Skiing"
1994	The Fresh Prince of Bel-Air	Samantha	Episode: "Stop Will! in the Name of Love"
1995	In the House	Lisa	Episode: "Crush Groove"
1995	The Wayans Bros.	Tracy	Episode: "Two Men and a Baby"
1995	Family Matters	Agnes Prizker	Episode: "Bugged"
1995	Step by Step	Tiffany	Episode: "Baby Come Back"
1995	Hangin' with Mr. Cooper	Monique Harper	Episode: "The Great Pretender"
1996	The Parent 'Hood	Sashay	Episode: "We Don't Need Another Hero"
1997	Sparks	Tina	Episode: "Rehearsal of Fortune"
1998–2000	Pacific Blue	Jamie Strickland	Main role (44 episodes)
2000	Grown Ups		Episode: "Valentine J"
2001	The Parkers	Cleo	Episode: "Mummy's the Word"
2002	The District	Georgia King	Episode: "Return of the King"
2003	ER	Hannah's Mom	Episode: "Now What?"
2004	Half & Half	Tangerine	Episode: "The Big One Wedding and a Funeral Episode"
2006	Prescriptions	Rebby Turner	TV series
2007	Rx	Camille	TV film
2014	Chop Shop	Cop	Episode: # 1.4

=== Games ===
- RAMA (1996), based on the books of Arthur C. Clarke and Gentry Lee. Hunter played the role of Nicole des Jardins.
