= Toal =

Toal may refer to:

== People ==
- Eoin Toal, Northern Irish footballer
- Gerard Toal (born 1962), Professor of Government, Virginia Polytechnic Institute and State University
- Graham Toal, co-instigator of CDDB (Compact Disc Database)
- Jean H. Toal (born 1943), South Carolina Chief Justice
- Joseph Toal, Scottish Roman Catholic clergyman, currently Bishop of Argyll and the Isles
- Leslie Toal, Gaelic Football player and Hurler
- Maureen Toal, played Teasy McDaid in Glenroe

== Other ==
- TOAL, Test of Adolescent and Adult Language

== See also ==
- O'Toole (disambiguation), a more common anglicization of ó Tuathail than Toal is
