= Adam Duff O'Toole =

Irishman burned at the stake

Adam Duff O'Toole (Irish: Adducc or Adam Dubh Ó Tuathail; died 11 April 1328) was an Irishman burned at the stake in Dublin for heresy and blasphemy. What is known about O'Toole comes from a letter from the leaders of the Pale, the Hiberno-Norman colony around Dublin, to Pope John XXII asking him to authorise a crusade against the Irish. The letter names "Aduk Duff Octohyl" as leader of a host of Irish heretics. Modern historians regard the heresy accusations as politically motivated, and the letter as a counter to the Irish Remonstrance of 1317. Adam Duff was the son of Walter Duff, Chief of the Name of the Clan O'Toole, based in the Wicklow Mountains. The O'Tooles had formed an alliance with the King of Leinster, Domhnall mac Art MacMurrough-Kavanagh and Edward Bruce, to wage war against English rule over Ireland. Holinshed's Chronicles states:

A gentleman of the familie of the O'Toolies in Leinster, named Adam Duffe, possessed by some wicked spirit of error, denied obstinatelie the incarnation of our Sauior, the trinitie of persons in the vnitie of the Godhead, and the resurrection of the flesh; as for the holie Scripture, he said it was but a fable: the Virgin Marie he affirmed to be a woman of dissolute life, and the apostolike see erroneous. For such assertions he was burnt in Hogging greene, beside Dublin.

Hogging or Hogges Green was a green extending south and east from the modern College Green and centred on the Hogges, a Norse Dublin Thing mound.
