= Rama (video game) =

1996 video game

- Developer: Dynamix
- Publisher: Sierra On-Line
- Director: J. Mark Hood
- Producer: Kate Kloos
- Designer: Gentry Lee
- Programmers: Steven Hill; Derrick Carlin
- Artists: Richard Hescox; Derrick Carlin
- Writer: Gentry Lee
- Composer: Charles Barth
- Engine: Sierra Creative Interpreter
- Platforms: MS-DOS, Classic Mac OS, PlayStation (Japan), Windows
- Release: MS-DOS, Windows: NA: November 1996; EU: 1996; Mac: NA: January 1997; EU: 1997; PlayStation: JP: 1998
- Genre: Adventure
- Mode: Single-player

Rama is a point and click adventure game developed by the Dynamix subsidiary of publisher Sierra On-Line and released for MS-DOS and Windows in 1996 and Classic Mac OS in 1997. A PlayStation version was released in 1998 exclusively in Japan. The game is based upon Arthur C. Clarke's books Rendezvous with Rama and Rama II, combining elements of their plots with a story that sees the player assuming the role of a replacement crew member for an expedition to investigate an interstellar ship and uncover its mysteries.

The game was praised for its music, story, and alien creatures. Critics mentioned similarities to Myst. It is the second game that Clarke was involved in, following the 1984 interactive fiction game Rendezvous with Rama by Telarium. A sequel to Rama was planned, but not developed.

== Gameplay ==
Rama is played from a first person perspective. Players can interact with objects, picking up items and examining them in their inventory, along with using them to solve puzzles. To assist in exploration, the player has a wrist-based computer system designed to receive communication from other characters, examine data files, and provide a map of locations. Players also receive help from a small android which acts as the equivalent of an interface element for examining objects.

== Plot ==
Four years ago, a gigantic cylindrical object entered the Solar System. The International Space Agency (ISA) named it Rama and sent an expedition named "Newton Team" to investigate. They soon discovered that Rama is a hollow, rotating cylinder with enormous cities, populated by other alien species that have been collected during its travels: Myrmicats (seen in images but never encountered in the game), Avians, Octospiders. The "native" beings of Rama are the Biots (biological robots) constructed by the aliens who built Rama, and are a part of it.

As in many Myst-like adventure games, the player is an anonymous, silent protagonist—an astronaut who is assigned to replace the late Valeriy Borzov who died during the mission under mysterious conditions, as the introduction explains.

The player at first must investigate the area known as "the Plains" and find items that will help solve the logical/mathematical puzzles. Two Raman cities, nicknamed "London" and "Bangkok" by the expedition crew, will be visited in order to learn more about the species that accompany the astronauts. To proceed, the player must solve "complete with the shape which is logically missing" puzzles as well as mathematic exercises in the octal and hexadecimal number systems.

After the Plains have been explored (actually when the player has managed to reach and obtain all the useful inventory items), Rama changes towards an impact course with Earth and a special team inside the expedition (originally consisting of Heilmann, Borzov and O'Toole) proceeds to the "Project Trinity" and arms a bomb network to destroy Rama and its inhabitants. The player then proceeds to the "New York" island within the Cylindrical Sea which houses one of the bombs. While there, the player learns that Rama's course has diverted away from Earth and is no longer a risk, but the bombs have already been armed to explode in six hours. Unfortunately, O'Toole, who knows the code to disarm it, is lost, and during the six in-game hours, the player has to interpret the code and find the bomb in order to disarm it.

=== Characters ===
Many of the characters first appeared in the novel Rama II. Characters are portrayed by live actors. There are several hints throughout the game about the characters' relations that point to a secondary plot. There are also some characters who are never met but are referred to elsewhere in the game:

- Shigeru Takagishi (Scientist) (played by Jim Ishida)
- David Brown (Mission Commander) (played by Robert Nadir)
- Francesca Sabatini (Video Journalist) (played by Tiffany Helm)
- Otto Heilmann (Chief Security Officer) (played by Sean Griffin)
- Michael O'Toole (Codemaster) (played by Robert E. Henry)
- Richard Wakefield (Chief Engineer) (played by Stephan Weyte)
- Reggie Wilson (Print Journalist) (played by Donald Willis)
- Irina Turgenyev (Career Cosmonaut) (Voiced by Sharon Mann)
- Nicole des Jardins (Medical Officer) (played by Amy Hunter)
- Puck (little robot) (played by Kevin Donovan)
- Falstaff (little robot) (played by Edward F. D'Arms)
- Hiro Yamanaka (IBI Agent)
- Janos Tabori (IBI Agent)
- Valeriy Borzov (IBI Agent; Deceased before the game and replaced by the player character)

== Development ==
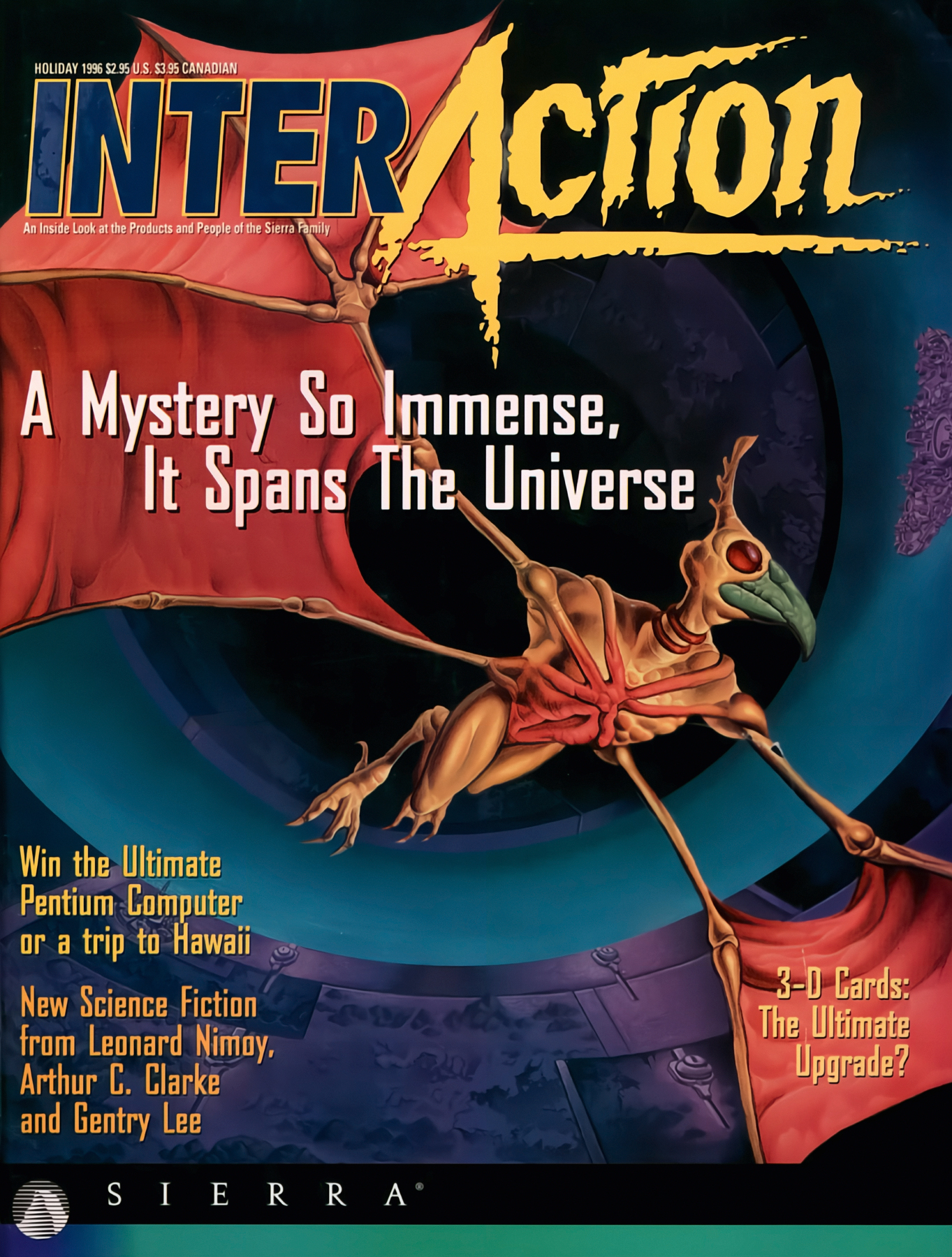
Rama on the cover of the Holiday 1996 edition of Interaction, the Sierra On-Line fan magazine

The game was created using version three of the SCI game engine. The visuals are a combination of 3D rendered scenery and live-action actors in 256 colours.

The game comes on two CD-ROMs, with a third reserved for videos. The first part of the videos show the prologue, concerning the reaction on Earth when Rama was discovered in a form of a journalist show, and hosts interviews of the characters that will be seen later in the game. The other features a brief interview with Arthur C. Clarke and Gentry Lee.

Clarke himself appears in some scenes of the game, such as when the player dies, and in the epilogue, gives advice to the player. He is implemented into the scenery and humorously interacts with it, provoking a Biot into a fight in one example.

The epilogue implies a sequel, which was already scheduled for production, but was never completed.

== Reception ==
Reception

Review scores
Publication	Score
Computer Gaming World	4.5/5
Next Generation	2/5
PC Gamer (UK)	70%
PC Gamer (US)	92%
PC Magazine	3/5
Computer Games Strategy Plus	4/5
PC Games	C+
MacHome Journal	3.5/5

Award
Publication	Award
Computer Gaming World	Adventure Game of the Year (finalist)

Before Rama's release, Sierra On-Line expected the game to sell 500,000 units in its first three months, according to the French newspaper Libération. Journalist Francis Mizio wrote that its global release in English, German, Italian, French and Spanish was part of this push. In August 1997, Charles Ardai of Computer Gaming World noted that Rama "appears to be selling reasonably, but still isn't generating the kind of business Sierra sees from a new Leisure Suit Larry". Libération reported that Sierra found the game's sales "disappointing" by that November, at which time Rama had sold 25,000 units in France.

Computer Gaming World's Keith Ferrel praised the game as the most convincing computerized world he encountered and "an environment studded with puzzles and enigma, challenges and mysteries." He also closed that "unlike MYST, the story here outweighs its setting, a tribute to Clarke, Lee, and the team that supported them. RAMA is in virtually every way a triumph and another large step toward the creation of wholly convincing interactive SF novels. It begs for a sequel, I think, and not least because, as Clarke himself wrote years ago, the Ramans always do things in threes." A reviewer for Next Generation largely agreed: "While all too Myst-like in design, Dynamix's RAMA manages to push past some of the inherent confines of its genre and provide players with some fairly balanced puzzles and a decently entertaining storyline." He wrote that while few of the puzzles are innovative, they tie into the story rather than simply serving as obstacles to progress past, and also praised the alien designs and musical score. He nonetheless concluded that he could not recommend the game due to its similarity to Myst.

Rama was a finalist for the Computer Game Developers Conference's 1996 "Best Adaptation of Linear Media" Spotlight Award, but lost the prize to I Have No Mouth, and I Must Scream. It was also a finalist for Computer Gaming World's 1996 "Adventure Game of the Year" and CNET Gamecenter's "Best Adventure Game" awards, which went to The Pandora Directive and The Neverhood, respectively.
