= Chasing the Moon (TV series) =

Documentary series by Robert Stone on history of US space program

- Directed by: Robert Stone
- Composer: Gary Lionelli
- Country of origin: United States
- No. of episodes: 3

Original release
- Network: PBS
- Release: July 8 – July 10, 2019

Chasing the Moon is a 2019 American television documentary series by Robert Stone about the race to land a man on the Moon. It includes archive footage not seen previously by the public. An accompanying book of the same title, authored by Stone and Alan Anders, was also released.

== Episodes ==
Episodes were each about 1 hour 48 minutes in length and covered successive stages in the history of the US space program between 1957 and 1969.

List of Chasing The Moon episodes
No.	Title	Summary	Original release date
1	"A Place Beyond the Sky"	Efforts by the United States from 1957 to catch up with the Soviet Union in the space race	July 8, 2019
2	"Earthrise"	The years 1964 to 1968, particularly the Apollo 1 and Apollo 8 missions	July 9, 2019
3	"Magnificent Desolation"	The Apollo 11 mission, including the lunar landing and return to Earth, its cultural impacts in the US and internationally, and its legacy	July 10, 2019

== Broadcast ==
Chasing the Moon was made for PBS and first broadcast on its American Experience program in July 2019 over three successive nights. It was among the documentaries and dramas screened that month to commemorate the 50th anniversary of the Apollo 11 lunar landing.

== Reception ==
Vern Gay of Newsday wrote, "Stirring history and vitally important."

== See also ==
- Apollo 11, a 2019 documentary
- Apollo 11 in popular culture
