= Scott Lautanen =

American television director and producer

- Occupation(s): Television director, television producer
- Years active: 1997–2010s

Scott Lautanen is an American television director and producer.

His credits include Pacific Blue, The Pretender, Pensacola: Wings of Gold, FreakyLinks, Numb3rs, Bones, Moonlight, Terminator: The Sarah Connor Chronicles, CSI: NY and CSI: Miami (also co-producer and associate producer). He also worked as a second unit director on CSI: Miami and the series Dark Angel and She Spies.

He is of Finnish descent.
