= Robert Stone (director) =

British-American documentary filmmaker

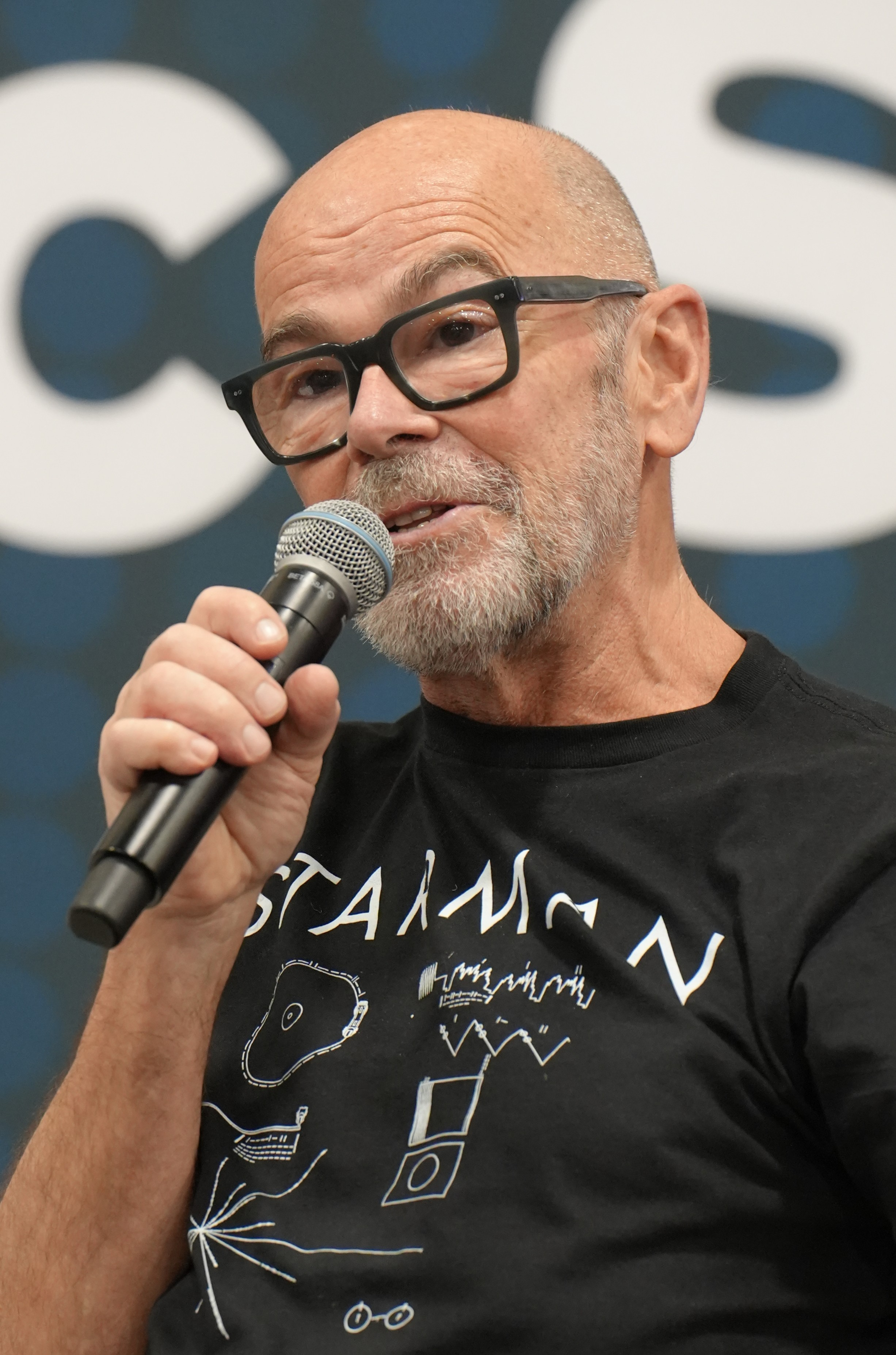
- Stone in 2026
- Born: England
- Occupation: Filmmaker
- Spouse: Shelby
- Children: 2

Robert Stone is a British-American documentary filmmaker. His work has been screened at dozens of film festivals and televised around the world, seven of his films have appeared on PBS's American Experience series and four of his films have premiered at the Sundance Film Festival (including as the Closing Night Film in 2009). His film Starman (2025) had its world premiere at the 2025 South by Southwest Film & TV Festival. He is an Academy Award nominee for Best Documentary Feature Film and a three-time Emmy Award nominee for Exceptional Merit in Documentary Filmmaking.

== Life and career ==
Stone was born in England and educated in the United States. His father Lawrence Stone was a noted historian and chair of the History Department at Princeton University in Princeton, New Jersey where Robert grew up, graduating Princeton High School in 1976. He stated: "My father was a history professor at Oxford and later at Princeton, so I grew up with that, it’s in my blood. It just seems very natural to me to combine my interest in film, my interest in history, my interest in politics and also my interest in exploring this crazy world that I grew up in.” He made his first film at age 11 in New Jersey, an anti-pollution film made by conducting street-interviews in Princeton.

He was later educated at the University of Wisconsin at Madison, did a brief stint at Sorbonne University in Paris and at the Lee Strasberg Theatre and Film Institute in New York. He became connected with director Kevin Rafferty and other filmmakers of The Atomic Cafe when he moved to New York in 1984. Known in large part for his innovative use of archival material in historical documentaries, Stone has directed several well received documentaries that he has shot himself, including American Babylon (2000) and, most recently, Pandora's Promise (2013), which makes the environmental case for nuclear energy as a solution to climate change.

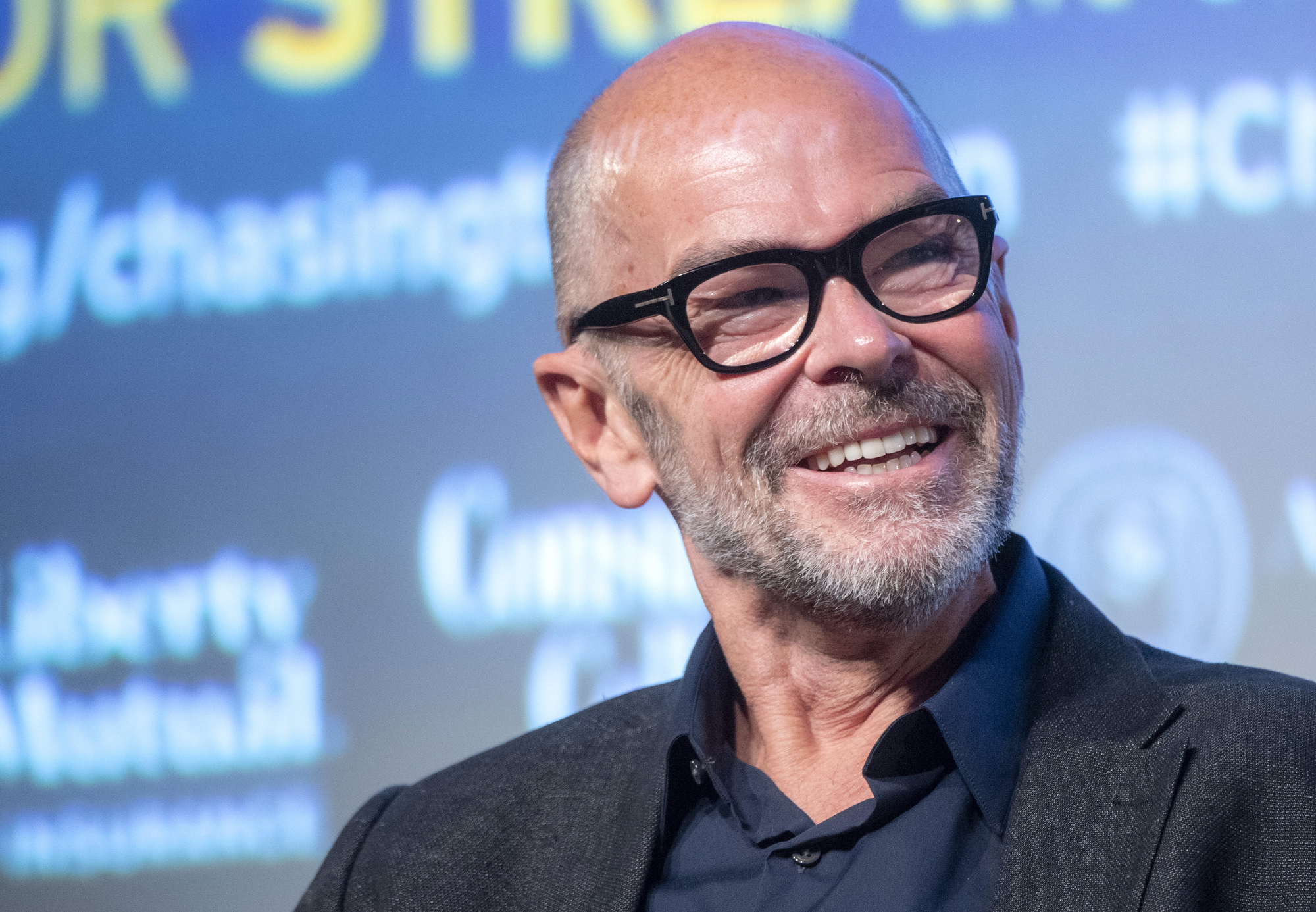
Robert Stone in 2019

His only foray into fiction filmmaking was a counter-factual fake historical documentary for German television called World War Three in 1998. Stone’s later works include the six‑hour PBS miniseries Chasing the Moon (2019), an epic history of the U.S. space race, the political thriller‑style Taken Hostage (2022) about America’s involvement in Iran, and Starman (2025), a biographical documentary about NASA engineer Gentry Lee.

In addition to his work making feature-documentaries, in the early 1990s he was commissioned to create a 24-part semi-interactive permanent installation at the JFK Presidential Library in Boston. His work with environmental issues, particularly the worldwide acclaim surrounding his film Pandora's Promise, led him to co-found the non-profit clean energy advocacy group Energy for Humanity with environmental campaigner Kirsty Gogan and philanthropist Daniel Aegerter. Stone is also one of 18 co-authors of the Ecomodernist Manifesto which challenges conventional thinking about the meaning of sustainable development. He also co-authored a companion book of the same name to be published by Ballantine Books. Stone lives in New York's Hudson Valley with his wife, Shelby Stone, a film and television producer, and his two sons, Luc and Caleb, from a previous marriage.

== Accolades ==
His debut work was the Academy Award-nominated Radio Bikini (1988), about nuclear tests performed around Bikini Atoll in 1946. Starting in 2017, Stone wrote, directed and edited a 6-hour documentary mini-series for PBS called Chasing the Moon, an epic political and social history of the space race. The film aired in 2019 coinciding with the 50th anniversary of the first lunar landing, earning Stone his third Emmy nomination for Exceptional Merit in Documentary Filmmaking and his second nomination the Writers Guild of America Award for Best Documentary Screenplay, and a duPont-Columbia Award among many other awards.

Variety film critic Owen Gleiberman stated that Stone "may be the most under-celebrated great documentary filmmaker in America." His films Guerrilla: The Taking of Patty Hearst (2004) and Oswald's Ghost (2008) both received Emmy nominations for Exceptional Merit in Documentary Filmmaking; Gleiberman hailed them as "two of the most explosively insightful documentaries of the last decade". For Earth Days (2009), Stone received a nomination for the Writers Guild of America Award for Best Documentary Screenplay.

== Filmography ==
- Radio Bikini (1988)
- The Satellite Sky (1990)
- Farewell, Good Brothers (1992)
- World War Three (1998) aka Der Dritte Weltkrieg
- American Babylon (2000)
- Guerrilla: The Taking of Patty Hearst (2004) aka Neverland: The Rise and Fall of the Symbionese Liberation Army
- Hollywood Vietnam (2005)
- Oswald's Ghost (2008)
- The Civilian Conservation Corps (2009; broadcast by PBS's American Experience)
- Earth Days (2009)
- Pandora's Promise (2013)
- Cold War Roadshow (2014)
- Chasing the Moon (2019)
- Taken Hostage (2022)
- Starman (2025)

== An Ecomodernist Manifesto ==
In April 2015, Stone joined with a group of scholars in issuing An Ecomodernist Manifesto. The other authors were: John Asafu-Adjaye, Linus Blomqvist, Stewart Brand, Barry Brook. Ruth DeFries, Erle Ellis, Christopher Foreman, David Keith, Martin Lewis, Mark Lynas, Ted Nordhaus, Roger A. Pielke Jr., Rachel Pritzker, Joyashree Roy, Mark Sagoff, Michael Shellenberger, and Peter Teague
