= O'Toole =

O'Toole is an Irish surname. It may refer to:

== People ==
- O'Toole family, a leading family in Gaelic Leinster
- O'Toole (surname), including a list of persons and characters with the name

=== Other uses ===
- O'Tooles GAC football and hurling club in Dublin
- Ensign O'Toole, a military sitcom starring Dean Jones, which aired on NBC, 1962-1963
- Slugger O'Toole, Irish weblog
- St. Laurence O'Toole Pipe Band
- USS O'Toole, the name of more than one United States Navy ship

== See also ==
- Other anglicizations of ó Tuathail:
  - Tohill
  - Toal (disambiguation)
