= Ron Auer =

American politician

Ronald C. Auer (born January 24, 1950) is an American politician. Auer represented District 68 from 1977 to 1992 and (after redistricting) District 59 (a portion of St. Louis City) in the Missouri House of Representatives from 1993 to 2001. He is a Democrat. Since 1992, he has been the party committeeman for Ward 9 in St. Louis City.

Auer was elected to the Missouri House by special election in 1977. He served as chairman of the House Insurance Committee and as a member of the following committees: Appropriations—General Administration & Transportation; Labor; Retirement; and Transportation.

Formerly an insurance salesman, real estate salesman and teacher, Rep. Auer is today lobbyist for numerous health care firms operating in Missouri.

After leaving the legislature in 2001 and until 2005, Auer represented Group Health Plan (GHP), Coventry Health Care, and Healthcare USA, in Jefferson City. Since early 2006, he has been registered representative for Cigna and Aetna insurance companies. His home-based lobbying firm is called Auer & Associates.

For several years after leaving the legislature, Rep. Auer served as chairman and treasurer of Democratic Legislative District Committee 59, a political party committee which funneled monies to campaigns of Democratic elected officials such as Missouri governor Bob Holden.

Rep. Auer has been a member of the following organizations: St. Pius V Catholic Church; the neighborhood associations of Tower Grove East, Benton Park West and Marine Villa; 3rd District Police Community Relations Association; and 9th Ward Democratic Organization.

He attended St. Louis Community College at Forest Park and received a bachelor of science degree in education from Southeast Missouri State University.

Auer currently resides with his wife Ann (a lobbyist for the City of St. Louis from 1999 to 2001; and since 2001 for the Missouri Growth Association) in the Tower Grove East neighborhood of St. Louis. They have four children: Tracy (40), Neal (38) - both from Ann's previous marriage - Amanda (25) and Lindsey (21).

== Sources ==
Official Biography - Year 2000 Legislative Session

Preceded by n/a	Missouri House of Representatives - District 68; 1977–1992	Succeeded by James O'Toole
Preceded by William Lacy Clay, Jr.	Missouri House of Representatives - District 59; 1993–2001	Succeeded by Russ Carnahan
Preceded by n/a	City of St. Louis Democratic Central Committee - Ward 9 Committeeman; 1992–	Succeeded by Incumbent
