= World War III (1998 film) =

1998 German mockumentary directed by Robert Stone

- Cover art
- Genre: Alternate history Pseudo-documentary
- Written by: Ingo Helm; Robert Stone
- Directed by: Robert Stone
- Starring: Boris Leskin, Klaus Schleif, Christopher Wynkoop
- Narrated by: David McCallum
- Music by: John Kusiak; Caleb Sampson
- Country of origin: Germany
- Original languages: German; English; Russian; French

Production
- Producer: Ulrich Lenze
- Running time: 94 minutes

Original release
- Network: ZDF; TLC
- Release: December 1998

World War III (Der Dritte Weltkrieg) is a 1998 German alternate history television pseudo-documentary, directed by Robert Stone and distributed by ZDF. An English version was also made, which aired on TLC in May 1999. It depicts what might have transpired if, following the overthrow of Mikhail Gorbachev, Soviet troops, under orders from a new hard-line regime, had opened fire on demonstrators in Berlin in the fall of 1989 and precipitated World War III, leading to an alternative outcome of the later period of the Cold War. The film mixes real footage of world leaders and archive footage of (for example) combat exercises and news events, with newly shot footage of citizens, soldiers, and political staff.

== Plot ==
In the summer of 1989, many East German citizens are dissatisfied with Communist leadership and seek reunification with West Germany. East German leader Erich Honecker hopes to crush demonstrations against the regime with military force. General Secretary Mikhail Gorbachev, a supporter of reforms, visits East Berlin in October during the 40th Anniversary of the GDR but is deposed by hard-line Communist leadership in a coup. In Moscow, the MVD Internal Troops and Soviet Army take control, seizing government and party buildings. Violent clashes in the streets take place, but by dawn, the city has fallen, and opposition to the new regime is driven underground.

After an emergency Central Committee plenum, Lieutenant General Vladimir Soshkin, a Red Army veteran and senior official in the Ministry of Internal Affairs, is installed as the new General Secretary and Gorbachev is never heard from again, retiring for reasons of 'ill health'. Long before his accession to the highest office in the USSR, Soshkin served on the Eastern Front with the Red Army during the Second World War, afterwards becoming a tank commander and was involved in the brutal suppression of the Worker's Uprising and the Prague Spring in 1968. Politically conservative, Soshkin adopts a more confrontational and hawkish foreign policy, with East-West relations deteriorating significantly following Gorbachev's ousting. Warsaw Pact leaders gather in Moscow on October 23, and Honecker expresses enthusiasm for a 'Chinese solution' to the unrest in Eastern Europe amid heated debate over the suppression of the Tiananmen Square protests.

Soshkin and the hard-liners, resistant to glasnost and perestroika, reverse Gorbachev's reforms and the Soviet Union experiences democratic backsliding and a return to autocratic rule. During a televised press conference in the Kremlin, Soshkin blames the USSR's economic decline on 'revisionists and traitors that penetrated the highest levels of our party and state apparatus'. In late October Chinese-style military crackdowns against popular uprisings in the Eastern Bloc occur, inflaming popular opposition to communism. The immediate reaction within the West is a mix of shock and outrage; the administration of President George H.W. Bush, who had spent months building on the warming of ties between the superpowers, is stunned to learn that the Soviet Union's best hope for reform has been ousted. Within the GDR's ruling Socialist Unity Party, a number of prominent officials who support political reform are purged, including Honecker's likely successor, Egon Krenz, Dresden party boss Hans Modrow, and Secretariat propaganda head Günter Schabowski. In late November, a demonstration in Leipzig is repressed by the East German Army, the VoPo and Group of Soviet Forces in Germany with great loss of life, and a demonstration at the Brandenburg Gate ends with East German border guards and soldiers killing East Berlin residents trying to scale the Berlin Wall and firing into West Berlin, with a West German cameraman recording the event among the victims.

The East German government responds to international condemnation by ordering foreign journalists out of the country and imposing a media blackout. Soshkin holds his first ever interview with western media in Moscow, and tells West German ZDF correspondent Dirk Sager that the western news media used Gorbachev's reforms to discredit the Soviet system and turn West Berlin into a 'base of aggression' against Warsaw Pact nations. The removal of Gorbachev, he argues, was a 'defensive action'. In mid-December, NATO airlifts military reinforcements to West Berlin following threats by far-left and far right groups. Secretary of State James Baker tries to meet secretly with General Dmitry Leonov, the Soviet commander in East Germany, who opposes Soshkin's crackdown, but Leonov is killed by a car bomb planted by West German neo-Nazis. When Soshkin threatens West Berlin, American Pershing II tactical nuclear missiles located in West Germany are placed on high alert. Soshkin responds by deploying the massive Soviet submarine fleet, which departs its bases in the Kola Peninsula for the Arctic Ocean, and sends Soviet Bear bombers into Alaskan airspace, which are intercepted by F-15 fighter jets. On January 25, 1990, East German and Soviet tank divisions cut off transportation and supply links between West Germany and West Berlin while the Soviet Air Force closes off East Germany's airspace. NATO deploys additional troops to West Germany. When the United States announces the first military convoy across the North Atlantic the Soviets announce their intention to blockade the U.S. Navy transports.

=== Beginning of war and the battle for Germany ===
After last-ditch attempts at negotiation fail, on February 18, the Soviet Navy and Soviet Air Force attack as the NATO convoy crosses into the Soviet-designated exclusion zone. Nearly a quarter of the convoy is sunk in the ensuing battle before NATO forces clear the air and sea lanes to Europe, as World War III begins. An emergency session of the UN Security Council fails to reach a solution to the crisis. American National Security Advisor Martin Jacobs travels to the Kremlin in Moscow for talks with Soshkin and Foreign Minister Rubanov, and offers an extended timetable for Soviet withdrawal from Eastern Europe in exchange for a military de-escalation. Soshkin refuses, speaking only once in the entire meeting: "Nyet (No.)"

On March 12, amphibious landings near Kiel catch NATO off-guard, but this proves to be a feint for the real invasion: soon after, Warsaw Pact ground forces drive through the Fulda Gap toward the Rhine with heavy air support. The invasion is intended to provide Soshkin a stronger strategic position for diplomatic bargaining, but the cost is high: both sides lose over 1,000 dead in the first 24 hours. Although pressed to the limit of endurance, NATO forces fight ferociously to stall the Warsaw Pact's advance, but by March 17 the Soviets and their allies have driven 50 miles into West Germany. Public order collapses, and cars jam the roads as civilians try to flee.

24 hours before a planned series of last-resort tactical nuclear strikes meant to stop the Warsaw Pact advance, NATO launches a surprise counteroffensive to seize control of the air. One component of the mass air offensive targets the Soviet Army's forward headquarters in Poland (with American stealth aircraft) and Warsaw Pact command and control posts, while the other consists of a massed attack against Warsaw Pact fighters and airbases. NATO and Warsaw Pact aviators battle to the death for control of the skies. Already hard-pressed after losing 1/5th of their combat aircraft in the initial offensives, the Warsaw Pact's air forces are ultimately defeated in the struggle, and NATO's air counteroffensive emerges a costly but complete success.

NATO gains supremacy over Eastern Europe while Polish underground forces cut off Soviet supply lines, and the Warsaw Pact rapidly loses the initiative with numerous headquarters and command posts gone. Unable to coordinate their efforts, and with their numerical superiority negated by Western technological superiority, the East German and Soviet armies melt under sustained NATO airstrikes, and counterattacking NATO forces cross into East Germany on March 23.

=== Global nuclear war ===
NATO forces break through and reach West Berlin on March 27, and the retreating Soviet Army abandons East Germany entirely as they withdraw into Poland, leading many Germans on both sides to believe reunification is at hand. In an effort to avoid escalating the conflict further, American leadership reassures Soshkin NATO will not advance beyond East Germany. Open revolt erupts throughout the Eastern Bloc, spurred by the collapse of East Germany. Soshkin's paranoia rises as the Eastern Bloc falls apart, and despite NATO's statements to the contrary, Soshkin becomes convinced NATO intends to fight all the way to Moscow.

On March 31, Soshkin makes a show of force with a nuclear strike via a TU-160 above the North Sea. The USA orders a full nuclear alert and prepares to execute the Single Integrated Operational Plan (SIOP). On April 1, ironically April Fools Day, a Soviet radar post suffers an equipment malfunction. Falsely believing the USSR is under nuclear attack, Soshkin orders a retaliatory strike against the West, with the R-36 unit at Dombarovskiy the first to launch its weapons. NATO, faced with total devastation, has no choice but to respond in kind, and thousands of nuclear devices are launched across the Northern Hemisphere. As Daniel Schorr reports outside the White House, President Bush is evacuated to a secure location via Marine One. The narrator announces "There is no further historical record of what happens next."

=== Back to reality ===
The film shifts back to Gorbachev's visit to East Berlin and a montage of heartwarming music reminds the audience the Cold War actually ended with the fall of the Berlin Wall and the collapse of the eastern bloc regimes.

== Characters ==
=== Actors playing fictional characters ===
Actor	Character	Title
Boris Sichkin	General Vladimir Soshkin	General Secretary of the Soviet Union
Boris Leskin	Yuri Rubanov	Soviet Foreign Minister
Christopher Wynkoop	Martin Jacobs	US National Security Advisor
Sigrid Braun-Umbach	Franziska Bruckner	West Berlin doctor
Gunter Walch	General Karl Frohm	West German Army
Klaus Schleiff	Colonel Wolfgang Heckler	East German Army
Oliver Hohlfeld	Markus Lehmann	East German citizen
Daniel Schorr	himself	Reporter in Washington, DC
John Ydstie	himself	Reporter in Lower Saxony

=== Clips of real life political leaders ===
Person	Title
Mikhail Gorbachev	General Secretary of the Soviet Union
Erich Honecker	General Secretary of the Central Committee of the Socialist Unity Party of Germany
George H. W. Bush	President of the United States
James Baker	United States Secretary of State
Bob Dole	United States Senator from Kansas
Phil Gramm	United States Senator from Texas
Helmut Kohl	Chancellor of the Federal Republic of Germany
François Mitterrand	President of France
Margaret Thatcher	Prime Minister of the United Kingdom
Manfred Wörner	Secretary General of NATO

== Differences between German and English versions ==
- The German version is preceded by a disclaimer clarifying that the events of the film are based on actual contingency plans of various governments (the filmmakers consulted numerous military experts on both sides, and received access to previously classified NATO and Warsaw Pact war plans), but that, "Thankfully for us all", the situations they were created for never happened.
- The news broadcasts which make up a significant part of the film are different: the German version, as a ZDF production, uses that network and its on-air personalities for the segments, while the English version shows various reporters working for an unnamed American network (for the opening scene, the English version shows Daniel Schorr's full report, while the German one has a ZDF report before switching to Schorr for the nuclear explosion).
- Similarly, in the German version, Senator Gramm's statements on the coup are replaced by those of Schleswig-Holstein Governor Björn Engholm, leader of the opposition SPD at that time.
- In the English version, other languages are subtitled (except for a Gorbachev speech about perestroika); in the German version, other languages are translated (except for field interviews with US Army officers once the hostilities start).
- The two West German characters, Gen. Frohm and Dr. Bruckner speak in German in the ZDF version and English for TLC.
- The English version contains two scenes not included in the German one: an interview with two East German soldiers who escaped to the West during the Brandenburg Gate massacre, and a pair of "man on the street" interviews (one bellicose, delivered with the accent and demeanor of a stereotypical New Yorker, the other nervous but optimistic) in Times Square.
- The English version mentions West German, British, Dutch, and American soldiers meeting the initial Baltic attack; in the German version, Belgian forces take part as well.
- In the German version, the decisive NATO air assault is named "Operation Bloody Nose"; in English, it is never given a name.
- The rewound montages between the missile-launch "ending" and the celebratory images of the actual events are slightly different.
- While the German version concludes with scenes from both the events of November 1989 and reunification (along with the "different course" line), the English narration has no such coda, and the montage is entirely from the fall of the Wall.

== Parallels and references to real-life events ==
- Prague Spring/Invasion of Czechoslovakia—General Soshkin had participated in the 1968 crackdown; the brutality of the forces under his command was so notorious that he appeared on the cover of Life magazine.
- Stanislav Petrov prevented the start of nuclear war during a time of increased US/Soviet tension when a Soviet radar computer malfunctioned in September 1983.
- Black Monday of 1987—Images of the alarming headlines it generated for the New York Post ("CRASH!") and Daily News ("PANIC!") were used to illustrate a Wall Street crash caused by uncertainty over the future and a looming international crisis.
- Tiananmen Square protests of 1989—Chinese students hold a pro-democracy protest near the seat of the Chinese government. After weeks of demonstrations, the People's Liberation Army forcibly ended the protest. This is the "Chinese solution" alluded to by Soshkin. The events of the movie are set four months after the crackdown. In reality, Honecker openly desired to deal with the unrest in this manner (to the point of trying to talk Gorbachev into such crackdowns in Poland and Hungary), even issuing a written order to do so in Leipzig, and was ousted in mid-October largely to prevent them from being carried out.
- The fall of the Berlin Wall and the reunification of Germany—Clips from both also appeared out of context: footage of the reunification was used to show celebrations following the liberation of West Berlin, to suggest it happened after the November massacre.
- The Soviet coup attempt of 1991 against Mikhail Gorbachev—Clips of US officials and "West German" Chancellor Helmut Kohl discussing this event were used in this film; since the coup occurred after 1990, Kohl was actually speaking as the leader of a unified Germany when he made these statements. In this alternate timeline, the coup takes place two years earlier while Germany is still divided, reigniting the Cold War.
- The Persian Gulf War of 1990–91—Clips of US officials discussing this war were used in this film. FLIR video footage of Coalition air attacks on Iraq is used to illustrate the attack on Warsaw Pact headquarters. News footage of the Allied airstrikes on Baghdad at the start of Operation Desert Storm is used to illustrate the bombing of Hamburg by Soviet and East German air forces.
- The Falklands War of 1982. Footage from the Battle of San Carlos and the Bluff Cove Air Attacks is used to illustrate the naval battle.
- The Bosnian War of 1992–95. Shots from aircraft cameras were used to illustrate the NATO bombing of Legnica.
- The Vietnam War. Footage of the US Marines at Khe Sanh under attack from North Vietnamese Army artillery is used to illustrate the Soviet and East German airstrikes on Ramstein Air Base in West Germany.
- The First Chechen War. Footage of Russian troops in the Battle of Grozny is used to illustrate Soviet forces retreating from West Germany back into East Germany. Footage of Chechen rebels fighting Russian troops is also used to illustrate the collapse of the East German government as well as to illustrate the growing armed resistance inside the Soviet Union to Soshkin's regime.
- The Soviet–Afghan War. Footage of Soviet troops is used to illustrate Soviet forces retreating to Poland.
- George H.W. Bush's statements "We're dealing with Hitler revisited" and possibly "our hearts go out to the hostages" refer to Saddam Hussein's invasion of Kuwait, not Soshkin.
- MiG 29 pilot ejecting at extremely low altitude. He is not shot down, he was performing aerobatics at the 1989 Paris Air Show at Le Bourget Airport when his engine flamed out.
