= Rendezvous with Rama (video game) =

1984 video game

- Developer: Telarium
- Publisher: Telarium
- Designer: Ron Martinez
- Platforms: Apple II, Commodore 64, MS-DOS, MSX2
- Release: 1984
- Genre: Interactive fiction
- Mode: Single-player

Rendezvous with Rama is an interactive fiction game with graphics published by Telarium, a subsidiary of Spinnaker Software, in 1984. It was developed in cooperation with Arthur C. Clarke and based upon his 1973 science fiction novel Rendezvous with Rama.

== Reception ==
German reviewers recognized the complexity of the storyline and the various possibilities of interaction with non-player characters.

== See also ==
- Fahrenheit 451 (video game)
- Rama, 1996 computer game also based on Clarke's novel
