= Guerrilla: The Taking of Patty Hearst =

- DVD cover.
- Directed by: Robert Stone
- Music by: Gary Lionelli
- Country of origin: United States
- Original language: English

Production
- Running time: 89 minutes

Original release
- Network: PBS
- Release: 2004

Guerrilla: The Taking of Patty Hearst is a 2004 PBS documentary film about the 1974 kidnapping of Patty Hearst by the Symbionese Liberation Army left-wing revolutionary group. It was directed by Robert Stone, and features interviews with Timothy Findley and SLA members Russ Little and Michael Bortin.

== Critical reception ==
The film was well received and, based on 46 reviews, has an approval rating of 87% on review aggregator website Rotten Tomatoes. The site's consensus reads: "Guerilla is a riveting documentary that chronicles in enlightening fashion the 1974 kidnapping of heiress Patty Hearst."
