= Paula Trickey =

American actress (born 1966)

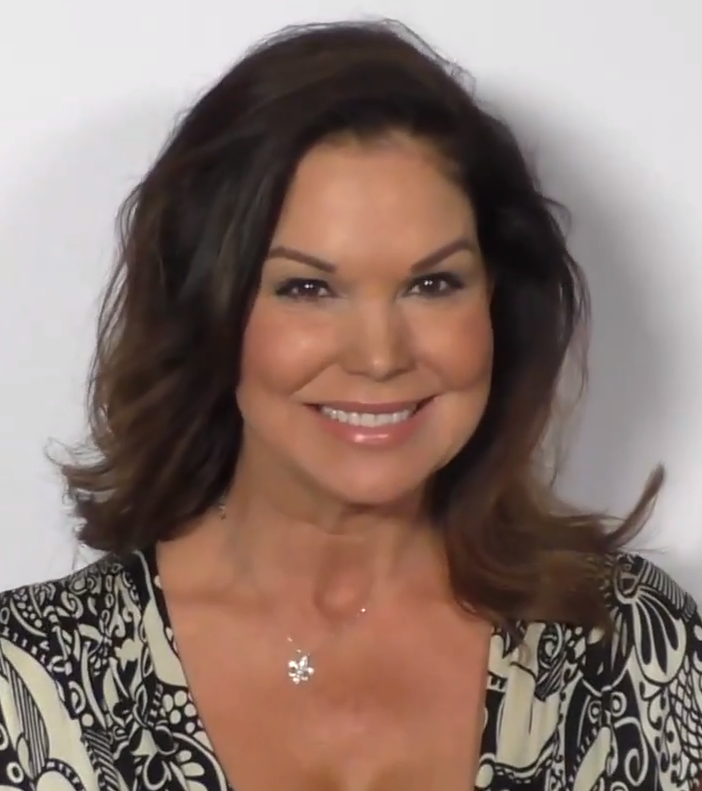
- Trickey in 2016
- Born: Paula Sue Trickey; March 27, 1966 (age 60); Amarillo, Texas, United States
- Occupation: Actress
- Years active: 1988–present
- Known for: Pacific Blue; The O.C.
- Spouse: Rich Thurber (m. 1996; div. 2010)
- Children: 1

Paula Trickey (born March 27, 1966) is an American actress. She is known for her role as Cory McNamara on the USA Network series Pacific Blue (1996–2000) and for her roles in a number of television films.

== Early life ==
Trickey was born in Amarillo, Texas to Virginia Demorest and Harold Trickey,and raised in Tulsa, Oklahoma, where she attended East Central High School. While in high school, she appeared in local television commercials and began competing in pageants. In 1985, she was crowned Miss Oklahoma in the All-American Teen Pageant (a Miss USA production), only to lose in the finals to an unknown Halle Berry.

== Career ==
Following high school, Trickey moved to Dallas where she studied acting and worked in commercials and local film productions. She moved to Los Angeles in 1986. Trickey is known for her role on the USA Network series Pacific Blue between 1996 and 2000 where she starred as Officer/Sgt. Cory McNamara. She has made guest appearances on many TV shows, including Beverly Hills, 90210, Baywatch, Renegade, Sliders, Walker, Texas Ranger and One Tree Hill. She appeared on the third and fourth seasons of The O.C., playing the mother of Harbor School socialite Taylor Townsend (Autumn Reeser). She's acted as the lead in several Lifetime, LMN and Hallmark movies and is moving into producing as well. She hosts and produces several celebrity golf charity events and music events for charity.

== Personal life ==
Trickey is divorced with one daughter. She has adopted three dogs from Puppy Haven Rescue in Tulsa, Oklahoma from 2023-2024

== Select filmography ==
- Maniac Cop 2 (1990)
- Beverly Hills, 90210 (1992–1993) (TV)
- Renegade (1993-1994) (TV)
- A Kiss Goodnight (1994) (TV movie)
- Pacific Blue (1996–2000) (TV) (main role)
- The Base (1999) (direct-to-video)
- Walker, Texas Ranger (2000) (TV) - DEA Agent Leslie Clarkson
- A Carol Christmas (2003) (TV movie)
- One Tree Hill (2004) (TV)
- McBride: Murder Past Midnight (2005) (TV movie)
- Gone But Not Forgotten (2005) (direct-to-video)
- Past Tense (2006) (TV movies)
- The O.C. (2006–2007) (TV)
- Til Lies Do Us Part (2007) (TV movie)
- Locked Away (2010) (TV movie; aka. Maternal Obsession)
- The Cheating Pact (2013) (TV movie)
- Betrayed at 17 (2014) (TV movie)
- Crimes of the Mind (2015)
- Paul Blart: Mall Cop 2 (2015)
- Bridal Bootcamp (2016) (TV movie)
- Running Away (2017) (TV movie)
