= Cradle (novel) =

1988 novel by Arthur C. Clarke and Gentry Lee

- First edition (UK)
- Author: Arthur C. Clarke and Gentry Lee
- Cover artist: David Scutt
- Language: English
- Genre: Science fiction
- Publisher: Gollancz (UK); Warner Books (US)
- Publication date: 1988
- Publication place: United States
- Media type: Print (Hardcover)
- Pages: 308 pp
- ISBN: 0-446-51379-2
- OCLC: 17384797
- Dewey Decimal: 823/.914 19
- LC Class: PR6005.L36 C7 1988

Cradle is a 1988 science fiction novel by Arthur C. Clarke and Gentry Lee. The premise of the novel is the contact between a few humans from the Miami area in 1994 and the super robots of a damaged space ship submerged off the Florida coast. Telecommunication advances such as videotelephones and highly efficient underwater scanning equipment used in the story bridge from the everyday, real-life aspects of the setting toward the near future, bespeaking technological progress.

== Plot summary ==
In 1994, the US Navy is testing a new missile, but after the launch it mysteriously disappears and it is clear that if the rocket reaches civilian areas they will be in big trouble. Carol Dawson, a journalist, is alerted by an unusual sight of whales in the Miami area, and decides to go and write about it.

Armed with special equipment provided by her friend, Dr. Dale Michaels from MOI (Miami Oceanographic Institute), goes to investigate the rumors of a missing missile belonging to the Marines and that could be behind the mysterious whale behavior lately. She hires the services of Nick Williams and Jefferson Troy, owners of a little boat so she can get to the Gulf of Mexico and investigate closer if a missile has something to do with all of the above.

They end up finding an unknown artifact, bringing doubts about its nature, and even if it is part of a lost treasure that could be worth millions. Old friends of Williams and Troy noticed the finding and just like the old times, they want to steal it from them.

In the background of the story, the author talks about a submarine snake civilization on a planet called Canthor, and how they were struggling to stay alive due to new threats into their ecosystem. It is revealed later in the story that the artifact found in the sea is actually a cradle that contains seeds with altered superhumans, which were extracted from Earth millions of years ago and were altered so they could live with other species (including the submarine snakes) on Earth. The spaceship that carries the cradle is crewed by robots/cyborgs and has hidden itself on Earth's ocean floor to make repairs.

Dawson, Williams and Troy found the damaged ship in the bottom of the sea while looking for the missile, and were asked to gather materials so the ship can be repaired and it could go back to its mission. Before leaving earth, the ship asked the humans to keep the cradle because it would enormously help the human race to have such superhuman seeds to develop faster and better through time, but in the end the humans refuse in order to avoid future wars between the human and superhumans.

== Critical response ==
The book has been criticized for excessive descriptions of the characters' personal lives unrelated to the plot and its numerous sex scenes. In one critic's words:

"I’m all for character development and, if it’s pertinent to future events, I don’t really mind if it drags a little. But the first few hundred pages of Cradle are filled with more-or-less pointless character development, clearly written by Lee, that would be perfectly at home in a Harlequin romance novel. A few pages of sci-fi, clearly not written by Lee, are interspersed so that the reader may be reminded that they paid $6 for a Clarke novel and not $2 for a grocery store romance tome."
