= James O'Toole (business figure) =

Australian businesspeople

James O'Toole is a pioneer of the internet and internet marketing in Australia, and began commentating on the web and its impact on business in 1995. O’Toole foresaw the rise of social media and social commerce and how the internet would transform the way businesses and consumers interact. He argued that the internet was not simply an ‘information revolution’ but a “communications revolution”:

“The key to understanding the Net and its importance is that this is a communications revolution, not an information revolution. Distributing masses of information is one aspect of the Net. On-line commerce in the future will be more about building relationships than selling ... Businesses will be communicating with people, and they will be communicating with businesses and with each other”

O’Toole was a founding producer of ninemsn - Microsoft’s first-ever joint venture – and Australia’s largest online publisher, in 1997. He has held senior executive positions with Fortune 500 and major Australian companies such as Microsoft, McGraw-Hill, 24/7 Real Media, Westpac and Optus. O'Toole is a prominent industry speaker and has spoken at international conferences including eMetrics SMX and SearchEngineRoom. He is currently CEO of James O’Toole Network, an internet marketing, innovation and business strategy organization.

O’Toole is a recipient of the PriceWaterhouseCoopers Australian Technology Award for eCommerce and has been an Official Judge for the Adnews National Advertising Awards. His online marketing expertise was also officially recognized with the European Platinum Seal of Excellence for marketing innovation, in 2005.
