= The Garden of Rama =

1991 novel by Gentry Lee and Arthur C. Clarke

- First US edition
- Author: Gentry Lee and Arthur C. Clarke
- Cover artist: Paul Swendsen
- Language: English
- Series: Rama
- Genre: Science fiction
- Publisher: Gollancz (UK); Bantam Spectra (US)
- Publication date: September 26, 1991
- Media type: Print (hardcover)
- Pages: 384
- ISBN: 0-575-05169-8
- OCLC: 32780517
- LC Class: PR6005.L36 G37 1991b
- Preceded by: Rama II
- Followed by: Rama Revealed

The Garden of Rama is a 1991 novel by Gentry Lee and Arthur C. Clarke. It is the third book in the four-book Rama series: Rendezvous with Rama, Rama II, The Garden of Rama, and Rama Revealed, and follows on from where Rama II left off.

== Plot summary ==
The book picks up the story nine months after the end of Rama II. The book follows the story of three astronauts from the expedition in Rama II who were trapped aboard the cylindrical alien spacecraft, Rama II, heading out towards deep space. Along the journey, Nicole des Jardins has five children. Simone, Catharine (Katie) and Eleanor (Ellie) by Richard Wakefield; Benjamin (Benjy) and Patrick by Michael O'Toole. These children are major characters in Rama Revealed. After a twelve-year journey, they arrive in the vicinity of the star Sirius, where all eight rendezvous with a Raman Node. This part of the story is written in the perspective of Nicole through her diary.

At the Node they are subjected to physiological tests for a year while Rama is refurbished, and they are eventually sent back to the Solar System, this time to collect two thousand more representatives of humanity. An Earth agency, known as the ISA, receives the message from Rama requesting two thousand humans. Upon its reception, the message is kept secret and, under the guise of a new Martian colony, the ISA starts acquiring its payload. The ISA selects a handful of their own representatives; meanwhile, they selectively gather convicts and promise them freedom if they are chosen to be a colonist. The payload is subdivided into three ships: the Nina, Pinta, and Santa Maria that arrive sequentially at Rama. At this point the colonists believe everything is a hoax (despite the colossal size of Rama) created by the ISA. With that discontent as the tone upon their arrival, Rama III heads back to deep space with its new payload.

Soon an aggressive group of humans, led by a mob boss, seizes control of the human colony and begins a war of annihilation and propaganda against one of the other species occupying the massive spacecraft. The original astronauts and their children find themselves powerless to prevent the genocide. However, the aggressive behavior of the human species does not go unnoticed: Another species, unknown to the humans, observes their behavior and starts considering a possible counterattack.

Meanwhile, Rama III determines that total escalation of the conflict is imminent and transmits an emergency signal to its ancient constructors. The book ends with a cliffhanger, on the eve of the execution of one of the original astronauts.

== Reception ==
A New York Times review prior to the book's release on September 1, 1991, reports the book features few events, is primarily philosophical and builds on the story of the previous two in the series. A 1998 review rated the book 2.5/5, mentioning that although there are highlights in the story, it deteriorates in the book's second half, reporting an overall poor storytelling through the use of stock characters. Another negative 1999 review is critical of the emphasis of Nicole's recounted childhood stories, but that the plot development is important to understand the later novel which they consider an improvement, Rama Revealed.

== Books in the series ==
- Rendezvous with Rama (1972)
- Rama II (1989)
- The Garden of Rama (1991)
- Rama Revealed (1993)

Gentry Lee also wrote two further novels set in the same Rama Universe.

- Bright Messengers (1996)
- Double Full Moon Night (2000)
