= Rama Revealed =

1993 novel by Arthur C. Clarke and Gentry Lee

- Cover of the first edition
- Author: Arthur C. Clarke and Gentry Lee
- Cover artist: Bob Corley
- Language: English
- Series: Rama
- Genre: Science fiction
- Publisher: Gollancz
- Publication date: October 14, 1993
- Publication place: United Kingdom
- Media type: Print (Hardcover)
- Pages: 480
- ISBN: 0-575-05577-4
- OCLC: 29334059
- Preceded by: The Garden of Rama

Rama Revealed (1993) is a science fiction novel by Arthur C. Clarke and Gentry Lee. It is the last in a four-book series of Clarke's Rendezvous with Rama by these authors and reveals the mysteries behind the enigmatic Rama spacecraft.

== Plot summary ==
The book picks up the story immediately after the end of The Garden of Rama. The book follows the story of Nicole Wakefield and her escape from imprisonment left at the cliffhanger of the previous book.

At this point, the humans had already come into contact with two alien species known as "octospiders" and "myrmicats". The octospiders were a simple species until a space-faring species made contact with them and forever changed their society. By undergoing genetic enhancements, the octospiders became biological wizards and were eventually able to form a utopia of sorts. The myrmicats (named by Richard Wakefield, a combination of the Greek word for ant, myrmex, due to their ant-like appearance, and the English word "cat" due to their feline size and running gait) were a naturally heteromorphic species whose final form was a large, interconnected sentient mesh which was able to directly interface with the human brain through a network of fibers connected to the body; while entering a symbiosis with another sentient "avian" species. Through this medium, it was able to communicate to Richard the threat posed to the species by the violent colonists, and at the request of the myrmicats he leaves their habitat carrying some of their eggs for preservation.

As the human colony continues to degenerate with respect to living conditions and human rights, the members of Nicole's family escape to the region nicknamed "New York", where they used to live in Rama II, and are eventually reunited with Richard.

Before long, the human colony police come after Nicole's family in "New York" and they flee to the octospider city. After the human colony leader starts bombing the octospider city under a made-up pretext and the octospiders retaliate, the situation becomes dire enough that Rama's controlling intelligence intervenes to end the conflict caused by the humans aboard, by sending everybody into hibernation until the end of the journey, except for the surviving myrmicats which are allowed to lead their daily life.

The Rama spacecraft rendezvous with another Node, an enormous tetrahedron near the star Tau Ceti, designed to research any intelligent life capable of spaceflight. The humans are divided into two groups based mainly on the degree of xenophobia they had exhibited during the journey. One group will stay at the Node to be studied; the xenophobes are segregated and never allowed to see another alien again. Before her death of old age, Nicole is allowed access to Raman technology unveiling universal insights.

== Books in the series ==
- Rendezvous with Rama (1973)
- Rama II (1989)
- The Garden of Rama (1991)
- Rama Revealed (1993)

Gentry Lee also wrote two further novels set in the same Rama Universe.

- Bright Messengers (1996)
- Double Full Moon Night (2000)
