= Test of Adolescent and Adult Language =

Standardized language assessment

The Test of Adolescent and Adult Language: Third Edition (TOAL-3) is a standardized, norm-referenced assessment of receptive, written and expressive language. The TOAL-3 was published in 1994. The test is used to help identify individuals who may have a language disorder, and to help determine in what area(s) the dysfunction lies. Though the test is commonly administered by a Speech and Language Pathologist (SLP), it can also be administered by anyone who has some training or practice administering language or psychology type tests, and has familiarized him/herself with the test and scoring procedures.

== Components ==
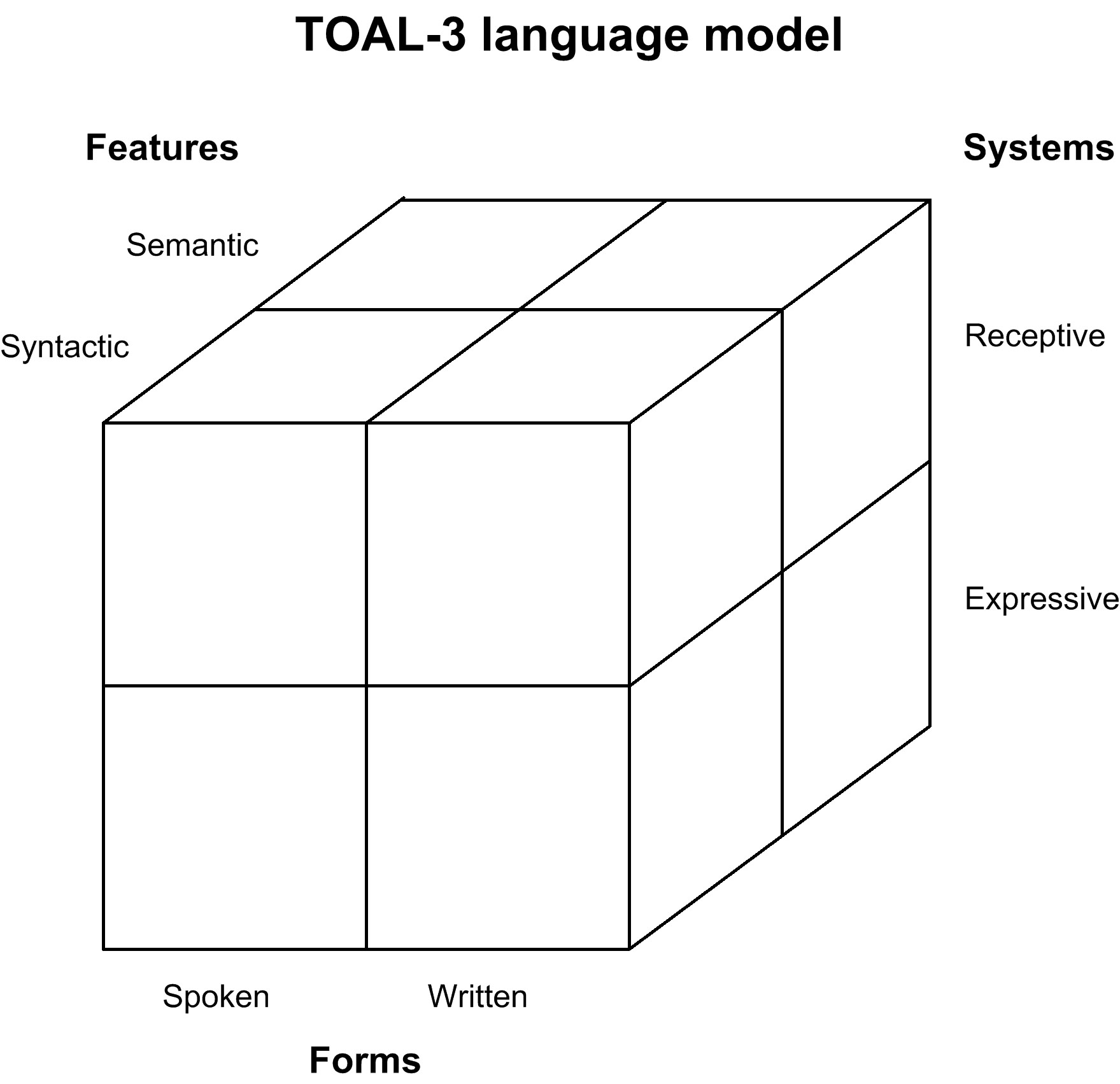
The three-dimensional TOAL-3 test model based on Test of Adolescent and Adult Language, Third Edition (p.4)

The TOAL-3 is composed of eight sub-tests examining expressive, receptive, and written capabilities in semantic (vocabulary) and syntactic (grammar) areas. It includes written portions of the sub-tests.

== Validity ==
The Examiner's Manual included in the testing materials provides detailed accounting of content, construct, and criterion validity for each sub-test, and the possible composites of those sub-tests. Test-retest reliability, inter-scorer, and internal reliability have been established using various measures. Results regarding this language assessment are consistent. However, when measuring language there can be many variables and much is left to examiner inference. Further assessment based on TOAL-3 results should not be undertaken unless one is a professional in a language area.

There has since been another revision, and the current version is the TOAL-4.

== Additional methods for assessing oral language ==
- Narrative analysis
- GORT-4 (Gray Oral Reading Test 4th Edition)
