= Pacific Blue (TV series) =

American crime drama television series

- Genre: Police drama
- Created by: Bill Nuss
- Starring: Jim Davidson; Darlene Vogel; Paula Trickey; Marcos Ferraez; David Lander; Rick Rossovich; Amy Hunter; Jeff Stearns; Shanna Moakler; Mario Lopez
- Opening theme: "Just Another Day in L.A."
- Ending theme: "Just Another Day in L.A."
- Composer: Christopher Franke
- Country of origin: United States
- Original language: English
- No. of seasons: 5
- No. of episodes: 101 (list of episodes)

Production
- Executive producers: Gary Nardino; Bill Nuss
- Producers: Paul B. Margolis; Emily Skopov; Paul Brown; Steve Mitchell; Craig Van Sickle; Gary Winter; John J. Scherer
- Production location: Santa Monica, California
- Cinematography: Robert Hayes; Christian Sebaldt
- Editors: John W. Carr; Barry L. Gold; Thomas D. Nelson; Ken Bornstein
- Running time: 44–46 minutes
- Production companies: North Hall Productions; Rigel

Original release
- Network: USA Network
- Release: March 2, 1996 – April 9, 2000

Pacific Blue is an American crime drama television series about a team of police officers with the Santa Monica Police Department who patrolled its beaches on bicycles. The show ran for five seasons on the USA Network, from March 2, 1996, to April 9, 2000, with a total of 101 episodes. Often described as "Baywatch on bikes", the series was run in many other markets, including Albania, Austria, Belgium, Bulgaria, Canada, Denmark, Egypt, France, Germany, Greece, Hungary, Israel, Italy, Kosovo, Lebanon, Norway, Poland, Portugal, Russia, Slovenia, South America, Spain, Sweden, Trinidad & Tobago, Ukraine, and Zimbabwe.

== Cast ==
- Jim Davidson as Officer/Sergeant/Lieutenant T.C. Callaway
- Darlene Vogel as Officer Chris Kelly (seasons 1–4; recurring season 5)
- Paula Trickey as Officer/Sergeant Cory McNamara
- Marcos Ferraez as Officer Victor Del Toro (seasons 1–3; guest season 4)
- David Lander as Elvis Kryzcewski (season 1; guest season 2)
- Rick Rossovich as Lieutenant Anthony Palermo (seasons 1–3)
- Shanna Moakler as Officer Monica Harper (seasons 4–5)
- Amy Hunter as Officer Jamie Strickland (seasons 4–5)
- Jeff Stearns as Officer Russ Granger (seasons 4–5)
- Mario Lopez as Officer Bobby Cruz (seasons 4–5)

=== Changes ===
The first cast change came at the end of the first season when David Lander, who played the Pacific Blue unit's bike repairman, was written out, though he would later return for several guest appearances in the second season. The series then underwent cast changes between the third and fourth seasons, which dramatically altered its tone. The events of the third-season finale brought the departure of actors Marcos Ferraez and Rick Rossovich, with their characters retiring from the force prior to the fourth season premiere. Ferraez would later return for a one-off guest appearance during the fourth season to wrap up his character's storyline. The fourth season premiere brought four major cast additions: Shanna Moakler as Monica Harper, Amy Hunter as Jamie Strickland, Jeff Stearns as Russ Granger, and Mario Lopez as Bobby Cruz. These new recruits to the Pacific Blue unit skewed the show's cast in a younger direction.

Jim Davidson and Paula Trickey, who had previously played the role of the show's young blood, evolved into the "old guard" as their characters took on leadership roles within the Pacific Blue unit. In addition, the characters of Jim Davidson and Darlene Vogel, who had become romantically linked in the third season, were married in the fourth season opener. Vogel later left the series on a regular basis at the end of the season, but returned for recurring appearances for the final season, including the series finale. Storylines for the fourth and fifth seasons emphasized undercover and vice work; while these areas would normally fall out of the purview of a police unit like Pacific Blue, the show always made an effort to explain away each incident as an exception, episode by episode. The changes can be credited with extending the life of the series for two additional seasons and made it the highest rated drama series on USA Network at the time. The series had well over 2 million regular viewers at a time when cable series were not permitted to advertise on other cable networks much less the Big Four broadcast networks.

=== Guest stars ===
The series featured numerous appearances by professional wrestling stars playing other characters, including Rena Mero (Sable), Chyna, Triple H and Shawn Michaels. (WWF Raw Is War aired on the same network.) Professional Intense Cycles Downhill Racer April Lawyer performed bike stunts in a number of episodes. trial rider Hans Rey performed tricks in each episode. Carmen Electra made a special guest appearance in her role from Baywatch. Other notable guest stars included Micky Dolenz, Shannon Tweed, Shannon Elizabeth, Danny Bonaduce, Adam West, Erik Estrada, Holly Robinson Peete, Kent McCord, Stephen J. Cannell, Brian Keith, Kelly Hu, Dennis Christopher, Kristanna Loken, Tichina Arnold and Larry Wilcox.

== Production ==
The series was created by Bill Nuss. It was executive produced by Gary Nardino, a producer and former president of Paramount Television and Bill Nuss. Their production company, North Hall Productions, took its name from their respective alma maters – Northwestern University and Seton Hall University. Nardino died on January 31, 1998, after which Nuss became the sole, chief show runner. Nuss continued to use the North Hall Productions name after Nardino's death.

Co-executive producers included E! Entertainment Television founders, Alan Mruvka, Marilyn Vance, Rick Filon, Richard C. Okie and John B. Moranville.

Pacific Blue was filmed in Santa Monica, Venice, Redondo Beach, Seal Beach and Huntington Beach, California, with the exception of two 1999 episodes that were filmed in Hawaii. Executive Producer Bill Nuss brought the show to Hawaii on the suggestion of April Masini, who also helped bring Baywatch to Hawaii in 1999. After the first 13 episodes, the series featured custom-painted state-of-the-art Trek Y bikes, outfitted with Spinergy wheels, NiteRider lights, and Janned police bags, making each bicycle worth over $5,000. The form-fitting uniforms are often credited with influencing the way bicycle cops dressed all over the world.

== Episodes ==
Season	Episodes	Originally released	
Season	Episodes	First released	Last released
1	13	March 2, 1996	May 25, 1996
2	22	August 17, 1996	April 20, 1997
3	22	August 3, 1997	April 19, 1998
4	22	July 26, 1998	April 25, 1999
5	22	July 18, 1999	April 9, 2000

== Release ==
=== Syndication ===
The series still runs in many countries throughout the world. The show has gained a slight uptick in recognition with the MTV reality series Meet the Barkers, which chronicles the married life of Blink 182 drummer Travis Barker and his wife (and Pacific Blue vet) Shanna Moakler. A clip of her from the series can be seen in the opening credits of Meet the Barkers.

=== Home media ===
On January 10, 2012, Mill Creek Entertainment released Pacific Blue: The Complete Series on DVD in Region 1. The 19-disc set features all 101 episodes of the series as well as 90 minutes of bonus features, including gag reels, production techniques and interviews. On the same day, Mill Creek also released the complete first season on DVD.

The series is also available for download on iTunes and other platforms, and currently the rights for the series are held by FilmRise.
