= Kirsty Gogan =

Entrepreneur and environmentalist

Kirsty Gogan Alexander
- Born: 11 July 1975 (age 50)
- Occupation(s): Entrepreneur, environmentalist
- Organization(s): TerraPraxis, LucidCatalyst, Energy for Humanity (EfH)
- Known for: Advocating for clean energy solutions, nuclear energy
- Board member of: Member of the UK Government’s Nuclear Innovation Research and Advisory Board (NIRAB) 4
- Awards: Global Women In Nuclear Special Award For Work On Climate Change (2016); Nuclear Industry Council Trailblazer Award (2019)

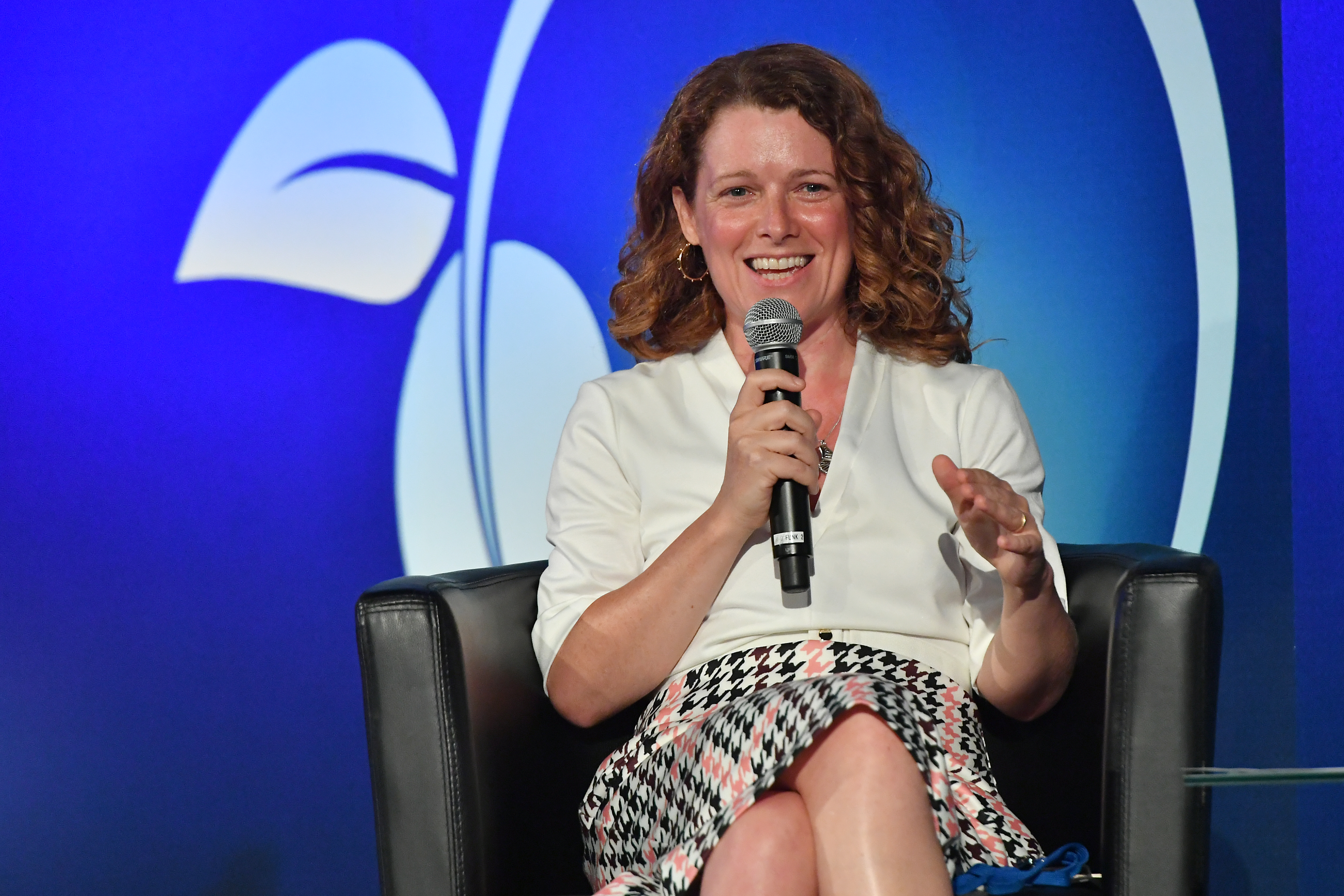
Kirsty Gogan CoFounder Energy for Humanity, Managing Director, LucidCatalyst, delivers her remarks at the Closing Session of the 2020 IAEA Scientific Forum: Nuclear Power and the Clean Energy Transition, during the 64th General Conference, IAEA, Vienna, Austria. 23 September 2020

Kirsty Gogan Alexander (born 11 July 1975) is an entrepreneur and environmentalist advocating for the use of all clean energy sources to solve climate change. In 2021, Kirsty was appointed as a member of the IAEA Standing Advisory Group Nuclear Applications (SAGNA). She was awarded the Global Women In Nuclear Special Award For Work On Climate Change (2016), and Nuclear Industry Council Trailblazer Award (2019).

== Career ==
She is co-founder and managing director of NGO TerraPraxis, consultancy firm LucidCatalyst since 2017, and non-profit organisation Energy for Humanity (EfH) since 2014.

Kirsty is a member of the UK Government’s Nuclear Innovation Research and Advisory Board (NIRAB).

Kirsty is also managing partner of LucidCatalyst, a highly specialized international consultancy focused on large-scale, affordable, market-based decarbonization of the global economy. In 2020, TerraPraxis and LucidCatalyst launched their flagship report Missing Link to a Livable Climate: How Hydrogen Enabled Synthetic Fuels can Help Deliver the Paris Goals.

LucidCatalyst has recently contributed to Decarbonising Hydrogen in a Net Zero Economy, an independent study supported by the IAEA and EDF. It was commissioned by ARPA-E to conduct a study on Cost and Performance Requirements for Flexible Advanced Nuclear Plants in Future U.S. Power Markets

Kirsty co-founded Energy for Humanity (EfH), an organisation dedicated to advocating for clean energy solutions. Kirsty has peer reviewed multiple publications, including the International Energy Agency’s (IEA) Nuclear Power in a Clean Energy System (2019) and Energy Technology Perspectives (2020); CleanTech Group’s investor report on advanced reactors in the clean energy transition (2020); and the Royal Society report on Nuclear Cogeneration: civil nuclear energy in a low carbon future (2020). She also contributed to Advancing Nuclear Innovation: Responding to Climate Change and Strengthening Global Security.

She spoke at CERAWeek.

=== Works ===
==== Peer reviewed ====
- "Advanced Nuclear Fission's Role in the Energy Transition". CleanTech Group. 15 June 2020.

==== Co-authored - Contributions ====
- "UK Energy System Modelling: Net Zero 2050. Nuclear Deployment Scenarios to Support Assessment of Future Fuel Cycles". LucidCatalyst. 17 June 2021.
- "Making Sense of Nuclear – Sense about Science". Sense about Science – Because evidence matters. 28 June 2017.
- "European Climate Leadership Report". Energy For Humanity. 9 November 2020.
- "The ETI Nuclear Cost Drivers Project: Summary Report". The ETI. 30 April 2018.
- "Cost and Performance Requirements for Flexible Advanced Nuclear Plants in Future U.S. Power Markets Report" (PDF). ARPA-E. 2020.
- "Driving deeper decarbonization with nuclear energy". IAEA. 8 September 2020.
- "Managing Drivers of Cost in the Construction of Nuclear Plants" (PDF). The Bridge, National Academy of Engineering. 2020.
- "Missing Link to a Livable Climate". LucidCatalyst. 6 October 2020.
- "The ETI Nuclear Cost Drivers Project: Summary Report". The ETI. 30 April 2018.
- "Cost and Performance Requirements for Flexible Advanced Nuclear Plants in Future U.S. Power Markets" (PDF). arpa-e. 2020.
- "Advancing Nuclear Innovation: Responding to Climate Change and Strengthening Global Security" (PDF). Global Nexus Initiative. 2019.
- "How to repower 2TW of Coal by 2050". Power Engineering International. 10 March 2022.
- "Viewpoint: Nuclear's transformative role in delivering net zero : Perspectives". World Nuclear News. 21 July 2021.
- "Designing the terawatt transition". Lloyd's Register. 16 February 2022.
