= Tom O'Toole =

Tom O'Toole may refer to:

- Tom O'Toole (businessman) (born 1952), Australian inspirational speaker, author and businessman
- Tom O'Toole (Boston College basketball), American basketball player at Boston College
- Tom O'Toole (basketball, born 1913) (1913–1983), American basketball player in the National Basketball League
- Tom O'Toole (rugby union) (born 1998), Irish rugby union player

== See also ==
- Thomas O'Toole (1931–2003), science reporter and editor
