= Rendezvous with Rama =

1973 science fiction novel by Arthur C. Clarke

- First UK edition
- Author: Arthur C. Clarke
- Cover artist: Bruce Pennington
- Language: English
- Series: Rama series
- Genre: Science fiction
- Publisher: Gollancz
- Publication date: June 1973
- Publication place: United Kingdom
- Media type: Print (hardback & paperback)
- Pages: 256; 69,048 words
- Awards: Hugo Award for Best Novel, Locus Award for Best Novel, Nebula Award for Best Novel, John W. Campbell Memorial Award
- ISBN: 0-575-01587-X
- Followed by: Rama II

Rendezvous with Rama is a 1973 science fiction novel by British writer Arthur C. Clarke. Set in the 2130s, the story involves a 50-by-20-kilometre (31-by-12-mile) cylindrical alien starship that enters the Solar System. The story is told from the point of view of a group of human explorers who intercept the ship in an attempt to unlock its mysteries. The novel won the Hugo, Locus, and Nebula awards upon its release, and is regarded as one of the cornerstones of Clarke's bibliography. The concept was later extended with several sequels, written by Clarke and Gentry Lee.

== Plot ==
An asteroid strikes the Po Valley in northern Italy on September 11, 2077, destroying the cities of Venice, Verona, and Padua and prompting the creation of the Spaceguard system to track potentially hazardous objects in space. In 2131, Spaceguard detects an interstellar object entering the Solar System, designating it "31/439" before naming it Rama after the Hindu god. A space probe reveals that Rama is a perfectly smooth cylinder 50 kilometres (31 mi) long and 20 kilometres (12 mi) in diameter, indicating that it was constructed by intelligent beings.

Endeavour is sent to study Rama, being the only ship close enough to do so. The crew navigates through a triple airlock system and descends one of three identical staircases. Inside Rama, they discover two plains that stretch across the interior circumference, divided by a frozen body of water they name the Cylindrical Sea. They identify several city-sized clusters of geometric structures, which they name after major cities on Earth. The United Planets follows their progress closely, and scientists are assembled to form a Rama Committee that considers theories and advises Commander Norton.

As Rama drifts closer to the Sun, the Cylindrical Sea melts, the temperature shift causes a storm, and three massive lights activate on each plain to illuminate the world. Boris Rodrigo, a crewman who adheres to an ancient astronaut-inspired sect of Christianity, suggests that Rama is a new Noah's Ark that will change course to begin orbiting the Sun. The crew floats across the Cylindrical Sea on a raft to reach an island they name New York, and a sample of the water reveals the presence of microorganisms. The structures in New York are positioned in patterns of three, without any openings, and their purpose is unidentifiable.

Crewman Jimmy Pak approaches Norton to admit that he smuggled a sky-bike onto their ship and offers to fly it above a cliff to reach the otherwise inaccessible southern plain. He flies to the other end of Rama, which is defined by a large spike several kilometres in length and surrounded by smaller spikes. Pak realizes that a static field is building around the spikes, which then emits a concussion that knocks his sky-bike out of the air and destroys it, stranding him in the southern plain. As he recovers from the crash, a crab-like creature arrives to disassemble the sky-bike and dispose of its parts. Pak is unable to determine whether the creature is biological or robotic.

Pak explores the patchwork terrain of the southern plain while he waits for rescue. He finds a single alien flower, which he takes. A rescue crew arrives on the raft, and Pak jumps from the cliff into the Cylindrical Sea so they can pull him aboard. A course change by Rama triggers a series of large waves, but Sergeant Ruby Barnes navigates them to safety. They see a damaged starfish-like creature emerge from the sea, and shark-like creatures arrive to disassemble it.

After returning to their camp, a spider-like creature with three eyes and three legs studies all of their equipment. More arrive, and one falls from a higher platform to its destruction. Surgeon-Commander Laura Ernst takes the opportunity to dissect the creature and finds that it is both biological and robotic, so they conclude that the creatures were designed by the Ramans and begin referring to them as biots. The government of Mercury, having decided that Rama is too dangerous, launches a nuclear weapon to destroy it. Rodrigo intercepts the missile and disarms it, taking advantage of the 12-minute time lag for radio communication between it and Mercury.

The crew prepares to evacuate as Rama gets too close to the Sun. For their final expedition, they visit a city with a laser and cut a hole into the side of a structure. Inside they find a collection of holograms that provide details on various Raman artefacts, including a suit designed for a three-legged humanoid. As they leave, the biots return to the sea to be disassembled and the lights begin to dim. The crew boards Endeavour and leaves Rama. Rama changes course to move directly toward the Sun and moves alongside it to gather energy. It then activates a space drive to propel itself out of the Solar System in the direction of the Large Magellanic Cloud. After Rama leaves, a member of the Rama Committee considers that the Ramans do everything in threes.

== Reception ==
John Leonard of The New York Times, while finding Clarke "benignly indifferent to the niceties of characterization", praised the novel for conveying "that chilling touch of the alien, the not-quite-knowable, that distinguishes sci-fi at its most technically imaginative". Other reviewers have also commented on Clarke's lack of character development and overemphasis on realism.

=== Awards and nominations ===
The novel received the following awards:

- Nebula Award for Best Novel in 1973
- British Science Fiction Association Award in 1973
- Hugo Award for Best Novel in 1974
- Jupiter Award for Best Novel in 1974
- John W. Campbell Memorial Award in 1974
- Locus Award for Best Novel in 1974
- Seiun Award for Best Foreign Language Novel in 1980

== Design and geography of Rama ==
The interior of Rama is essentially a large cylindrical landscape, dubbed "The Central Plain" by the crew, 16 kilometres in diameter and nearly 50 long, with artificial gravity provided by its 0.25 rpm spin. It is split into the "northern" and "southern" plains, divided in the middle by a 10-km-wide expanse of water the astronauts dub the "Cylindrical Sea". In the centre of the Cylindrical Sea is an island of unknown purpose covered in tall, skyscraper-like structures, which the astronauts name "New York" due to an imagined similarity to Manhattan. At each end of the ship are North and South "Poles". The North Pole is effectively the bow and the South Pole the stern, as Rama accelerates in the direction of the north pole and its drive system is at the South Pole.

The North Pole contains Rama's airlocks, and is where the Endeavour lands. The airlocks open into the hub of the massive bowl shaped cap at the North Pole, with three 8-kilometre-long stair systems, called Alpha, Beta, and Gamma by the crew, leading to the plain.

The Northern plain contains several small "towns" interconnected by roads, dubbed London, Paris, Peking, Tokyo, Rome, and Moscow. The South Pole has a giant cone-shaped protrusion ("Big Horn") surrounded by six smaller ones ("Little Horns"), which are thought to be part of Rama's reactionless space drive.

Both ends of Rama are lit by giant trenches (three in the northern plain and three in the south), equidistantly placed around the cylinder, effectively functioning as giant strip lighting.

== Books in the series ==
Clarke paired up with Gentry Lee for the remainder of the series. Lee wrote while Clarke read and made editing suggestions. The focus and style of the last three novels are quite different from those of the original with an increased emphasis on characterisation and clearly-portrayed heroes and villains, rather than Clarke's dedicated professionals. These later books did not receive the same critical acclaim and awards as the original.

- Rendezvous with Rama (1973) ISBN 978-0-553-28789-9
- Rama II (1989) ISBN 978-0-553-28658-8
- The Garden of Rama (1991) ISBN 978-0-553-29817-8
- Rama Revealed (1993) ISBN 978-0-553-56947-6

Gentry Lee also wrote two further novels set in the same Rama Universe.

- Bright Messengers (1995)
- Double Full Moon Night (1999)

== Adaptations ==
=== Video games ===
A graphic adventure computer game of the same name with a text parser based on the book was made in 1984 by Trillium and ported to other systems such as the Apple II and Commodore 64. Despite its primitive graphics, it had highly detailed descriptions, and it followed the book very closely along with having puzzles to solve during the game.

In Spain there was an official adaptation for the 2nd generation MSX computers called Cita con Rama that took advantage of the MSX's ability to produce (at the time) high-quality graphics. It was adapted from the Clarke novel in 1983 by Ron Martinez, who went on to design the massively multiplayer online game 10Six, also known as Project Visitor.

Sierra Entertainment created Rama in 1996 as a point and click adventure game in the style of Myst. Along with highly detailed graphics, Arthur C. Clarke also appeared in the game as the guide for the player. This game featured characters from the sequel book Rama II.

=== Radio adaptation ===
In 2009, BBC Radio 4 produced a two-part radio adaptation of the book as part of a science-fiction season. It was adapted by Mike Walker, and was broadcast on 1 March 2009 (Part 1) and 8 March 2009 (Part 2).

=== Film ===
In the early 2000s, actor Morgan Freeman expressed his desire to produce a film based on Rendezvous with Rama. The film has been stuck in "development hell" for many years. In 2003, after initial problems procuring funding, it appeared the project would go into production. The film was to be produced by Freeman's production company, Revelations Entertainment. David Fincher, touted on Revelations' Rama web page as far back as 2001, stated in a late 2007 interview that he was still attached to helm.

By late 2008, David Fincher stated the movie was unlikely to be made. "It looks like it's not going to happen. There's no script and as you know, Morgan Freeman's not in the best of health right now. We've been trying to do it but it's probably not going to happen."

In 2010, Freeman stated in an interview that he was still planning to make the project but that it has been difficult to find the right script. He also stated that it should be made in 3D. In January 2011, Fincher stated in an interview with MTV that he was still planning to make the film after he had completed work on his planned remake of Twenty Thousand Leagues Under the Seas (which was scheduled to begin production in 2012 but has since been scrapped). He also reiterated Freeman's concerns about the difficulty of finding the right script.

In an interview with Neil deGrasse Tyson in February 2012, Freeman indicated an interest in playing the role of Commander Norton for the film, stating that "my fantasy of commanding a starship is commanding Endeavour". Tyson then asked, "So is this a pitch to be ... that person if they ever make that movie?" to which Freeman reaffirmed, "We are going to make that movie." In response to a plea to "make that come out sooner rather than later", Freeman reiterated that difficulty in authoring a high quality script is the primary barrier for the film, stating "... the only task you have that's really really hard in making movies, harder than getting money, is getting a script ... a good script".

In December 2021, it was announced that the film was in development at Alcon Entertainment with Denis Villeneuve set to direct. Morgan Freeman and Lori McCreary are on the production team because their Revelations Entertainment previously owned the rights. Alcon co-CEOs Broderick Johnson and Andrew Kosove will produce. As of February 2024, Villeneuve was in the process of writing the script.

== Non-fictional aspects ==
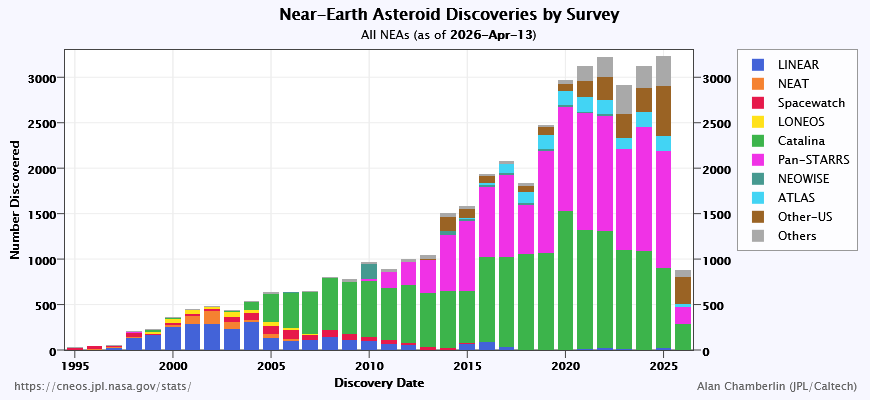
Number of NEOs detected by various projects: LINEAR; NEAT; Spacewatch; LONEOS / CSS; Pan-STARRS; NEOWISE other

Clarke created the space study program which detects Rama, Project Spaceguard, as a method of identifying near-Earth objects on Earth-impact trajectories; in the novel it was initiated in 2077. A real project named Spaceguard was initiated in 1992, named after Clarke's fictional project and "with the permission and encouragement of Clarke". After interest in the dangers of asteroid strikes was heightened by a series of Hollywood disaster films, the United States Congress gave NASA authorisation and funding to support Spaceguard. By 2017, there were a number of different efforts to detect potentially dangerous asteroids. The Vera C. Rubin Observatory, which started operation in 2026, has this task as one of its main objectives, and is expected to find roughly 80% of the most hazardous asteroids.

On 19 October 2017 an incoming interstellar object was discovered by Pan-STARRS, a system similar to Spaceguard. Like Rama, the object had an unusually elongated shape. Before the official Hawaiian name ʻOumuamua was selected by the International Astronomical Union, a popular choice was Rama.

== See also ==
- McKendree cylinder
- Generation starship
