= Jim Davidson (actor) =

American actor

- Born: January 18, 1963 (age 63); Pennsylvania, U.S.
- Occupations: Actor, model
- Years active: 1994–2005
- Notable work: Pacific Blue

Jim Davidson (born January 18, 1963) is an American actor and model active in the 1990s and early 2000s. Davidson is a graduate of Lehigh University.

== Career ==
He graduated from Selinsgrove High School in Snyder County, Pennsylvania, United States. Jim earned his Bachelor of Science from Lehigh University in Bethlehem, Pennsylvania. He worked as a public accountant for PricewaterhouseCoopers in New York City before he was discovered by a model agency.

Davidson's first television role came as the pit reporter on the monster truck racing series Monster Wars, which lasted one season in 1993 before being cancelled. He is best known for his work on the mid-1990s television drama Pacific Blue. Since then, Davidson has guest-starred in a number of prime time dramas and appeared on CBS's soap opera Guiding Light from 2001 to 2002 and 2005.

A television pilot based on the Snopes.com website by writer-director Michael Levine called Snopes: Urban Legends was completed in 2002 with Davidson as host, but major networks passed on the project.

== Filmography ==
Year	Title	Role	Notes
1994	Monster Wars	Pit Reporter	Unknown episodes
1995	Lois & Clark: The New Adventures of Superman	Assassin / Boomer	2 episodes
1995	Crowfoot	Det. Nick Crowfoot	Television film
1995	Last Gasp	Julian Weeks	
1996	Reasons of the Heart	Berkeley Russell	
1996–2000	Pacific Blue	TC Callaway	101 episodes
1997	The Sentinel	Mitch Jaeger	
2000	Charmed	Evan Stone	
2000	18 Wheels of Justice	Jesse James Rader	3 episodes
2003	Disaster	Roger Goodwin	
2005	The Bold and the Beautiful	Dr. Johnny Berlanti	2 episodes
2005	CSI: Miami	Rod Merrick	
