= O'Toole family =

Ancient Irish dynasties

O'Toole Ó Tuathail
- O'Toole coat of arms
- Parent house: Uí Dúnlainge
- Country: County Wicklow
- Founder: Tuathal mac Augaire, King of Leinster
- Historic seat: Powerscourt Castle, Wicklow; Castleruddery, Wicklow; Carnew Castle, Wicklow; Threecastles Castle, Wicklow

The O'Toole (Irish: Ó Tuathail) family of County Wicklow, formerly one of the leading clans of Leinster, descended from Tuathal mac Augaire, King of Leinster (died 958), of the Uí Muiredaig branch of the Uí Dúnlainge dynasty.

Not all people with this surname are necessarily related to this specific family, there being several other Irish families of the name.

== History ==
=== Origins ===
According to historian C. Thomas Cairney, the O'Tooles were one of the chiefly families of the Uí Dúnlainge who in turn were a tribe from the Dumnonii or Laigin who were the third wave of Celts to settle in Ireland during the first century BC. The O'Tooles as descendants of the Kings of Leinster is supported by John O'Hart in his 1892 Irish Pedigrees; or, The Origin and Stem of The Irish Nation. O'Hart also states that the O'Tooles were chiefs of the Hy-Muireadaigh, also known as the Uí Muiredaig who were a branch of the Uí Dúnlainge.

The first to use the surname in true hereditary fashion appears to have been the grandson of Tuathal Mac Augaire, Doncaon, slain at Leighlin in 1014.

Their original territory comprised the southern part of the present County Kildare but they were driven from it during the Anglo Norman invasion and settled in the mountains of what is now County Wicklow around Glendalough through the 12th century. The area they controlled was roughly identical to the old diocese of Glendalough, with the centre of their power in the region around the Glen of Imaal.

=== 16th century ===
At the start of the 16th century, there were five great houses, all, owing allegiance to "The O'Toole of Powerscourt" as the recognized chief:

- O'Toole of Castleruddery, residing in Glen Imaile.
- O'Toole of O'Toole's Castle, Ballymacledy, (now Upper Talbotstown), Glen Imaile.
- O'Toole of Carnew Castle.
- Art Oge O'Toole of Castle Kevin, Fertie.
- Tirlogh O'Toole of Powerscourt, Feracualan.
- O'Toole of Omey, Iar Connaught, with other minor houses of the family such as OToole of Ballineddan and Brittas, in the Glen Imaile; O'Toole of Toolestown, near Dunlavin; O'Toole of Glengap, or Glen of the Downs (as it is now called); and a few others.

At the start of the 16th century, the leading branches of the clan were to a certain extent independent of each other; they were all bound to protect themselves; but in external matters affecting the whole clan they were bound to obey the head of the sept.

=== 17th century ===
As a major fortification, the Carrickmines Castle had an extensive curtain wall flanked by towers protecting an area of some acres. Within this was a settlement with a variety of wooden and stone buildings, mills, and a keep or hall house in the centre. The site still contains impressive defences, hewn into bedrock, and human remains from when the castle was overwhelmed in 1642. In the Irish Rebellion of 1641, the Catholic Walshes, who owned the castle, sided with the native Irish and the Confederate attempt to create the first independent Irish parliament. They paid dearly – as a focus of the Irish Confederate Wars, the castle was besieged by English forces, and when it was retaken, over 300 of the Walsh, O'Byrne, and O'Tooles were massacred.

Despite the proximity of Dublin, the centre of English rule in Ireland, the Ó Tuathail's maintained a fierce independence, and were a source of great fear to the inhabitants of Dublin and the Pale for almost four centuries. With their kinsmen the O'Byrnes, they were noted for their tough resistance to English domination, including exercising great influence over the foundation of the Confederation of Kilkenny in 1642 in what had become Confederate Ireland.

=== 18th century ===
Throughout their history the family were famous as soldiers, from fighting the English in the glens of Wicklow to serving in the armies of other Catholic European countries in the 18th century, such as France and Spain.

A branch of the O'Tooles are also settled in counties Galway, Mayo and Cavan.

== Name variants ==
The descendants of the sept took the name O'Toole or Toole, although the name is now rare without the prefix 'O'. The tradition of surnames in Ireland developed spontaneously, as the population increased and the former practice, first of single names and then of ephemeral patronymics or agnomina of the nickname type proved insufficiently definitive. At first the surname was formed by prefixing 'Mac' to the father's Christian name or 'Ó 'to that of a grandfather or earlier ancestor.

Names that are related to Ó Tuathail include: O'Toole, O'Tool, Toole, Tooles, Tool, Toil, Tooley, Toal, Toale, Tohill, Toohill, Towle, Towell, Tollan, Tolan, Toland, Tooill, Toop, Toolan, Toulan.

== See also ==
- O'Toole (disambiguation)
- Irish nobility
- Irish royal families
- Irish name
- Irish clans
