= James O'Toole (American politician) =

American politician

James P. O'Toole (born April 2, 1958) is an American politician. A Democrat, O'Toole represented portions of St. Louis City and Shrewsbury (District 68) in the Missouri House of Representatives from 1992 to 2002.

O'Toole is a small business owner and a member of the politically influential Plumbers and Pipefitters Local 562 labor union.

A 1976 graduate of Cleveland High School in St. Louis, O'Toole attended Western Illinois University and graduated from the University of Missouri–St. Louis with a bachelor of science degree in business and marketing.

He served as a lieutenant in the sheriff's department for twelve years in the City of St. Louis, as a supervisor in the service department.

Awards received by O'Toole include Awards of Appreciation from the Missouri Pest Control Association, the Missouri Police Chiefs Association and the Judiciary Award of Appreciation.

As a result of redistricting in 2002, District 68 moved to Barry and Stone counties in southwestern Missouri. After leaving the legislature, O'Toole served for a time as Democratic director of the Board of Election Commissioners for the City of St. Louis. He also made an unsuccessful bid for the Democratic nomination for Ward 16 alderman in St. Louis in 2003.

== Family ==
O'Toole resides in Princeton Heights, St. Louis with his wife, Ronda, and three children: Alexandra, Timothy and Katherine. Katherine is now married to MLB pitcher Josh Fleming.

== Sources ==
- Official Biography - Year 2002 Legislative Session

Preceded by Ron Auer	Missouri House of Representatives - District 68; 1992–2002	Succeeded by Larry Gene Taylor
