= Gentry Lee =

American scientist and science fiction author

Bert Gentry Lee
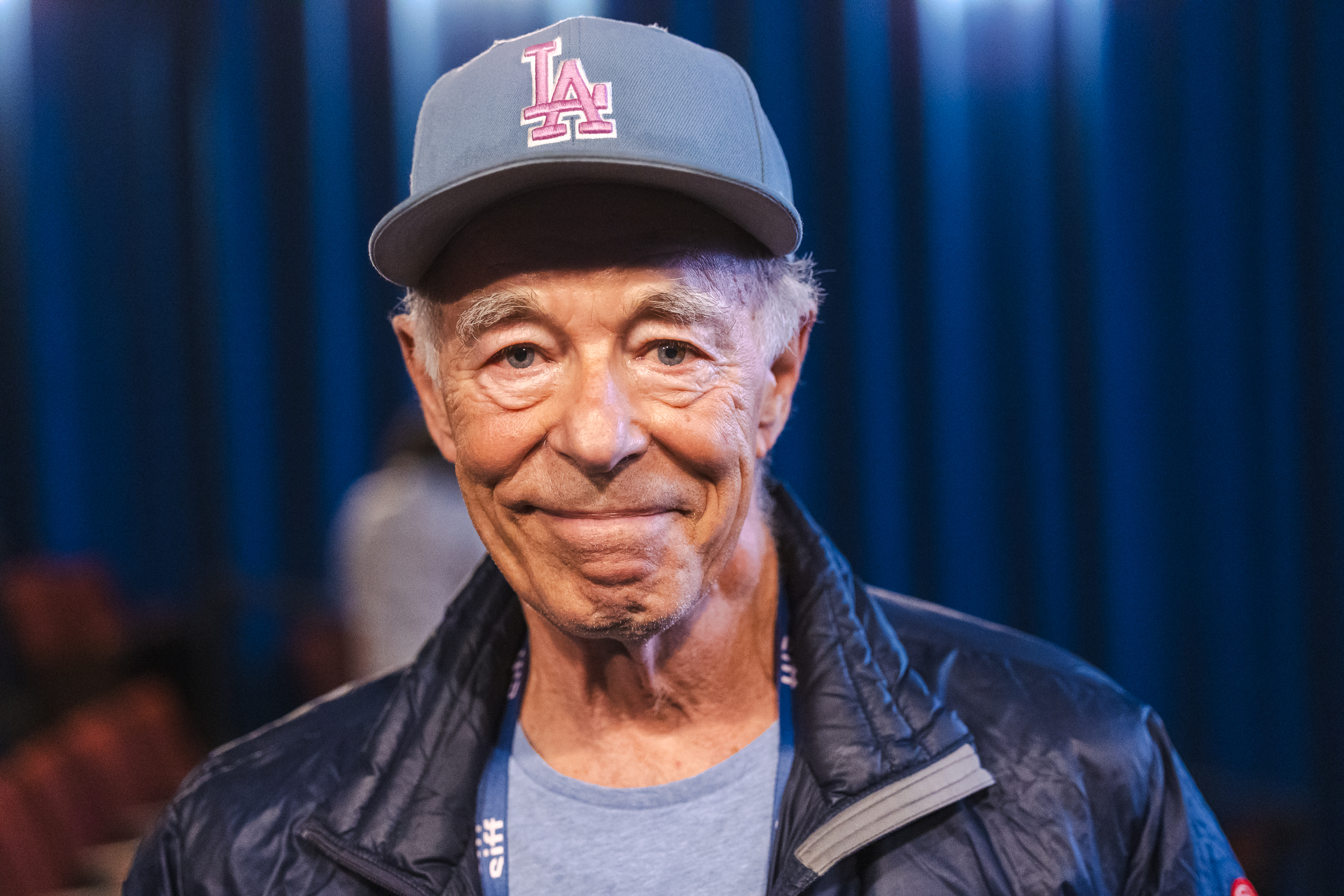
- Gentry Lee at the 2025 Seattle International Film Festival
- Born: March 29, 1942 (age 84); New York City, U.S.
- Occupation: Engineer
- Writing career
- Genre: Science fiction

Bert Gentry Lee (born March 29, 1942) is an American scientist, space engineer, and science fiction author.

== Space career ==
Lee was director of science analysis and mission planning during the Viking missions to Mars in the 1970s. He was also the chief engineer for the Galileo mission from 1977 to 1988. He worked on the Stardust and Deep Impact missions to comets in the late 1990s and early 2000s. He had engineering oversight responsibility for the Mars Exploration Rovers, which landed in January 2004 and the Mars Reconnaissance Orbiter (2006).

In 2009, Gentry narrated and appeared in Discovery Channel's two-hour special Are We Alone?, which examined the possibility of life on other worlds in the Solar System.

Gentry is also the subject of Starman (2025), a documentary about his life and career directed by Oscar-nominated filmmaker Robert Stone that had its world premiere at the 2025 SXSW Film Festival.

== Writing career ==
Lee co-wrote, with Arthur C. Clarke, the books Cradle in 1988, Rama II in 1989, The Garden of Rama in 1991 and Rama Revealed in 1993. He collaborated with Carl Sagan on the 1980 series Cosmos as project manager.

Rendezvous With Rama was written in 1972 and Clarke had no intention of writing a sequel. Lee turned the Rama series into a more character-driven story following the adventures of Nicole des Jardins Wakefield, who becomes the main character in Rama II, The Garden of Rama, and Rama Revealed. When asked, Arthur C. Clarke said that Gentry Lee did the writing while he was a source of ideas.

Lee went on to write three more science fiction novels after Rama Revealed. Two take place in the Rama universe (Bright Messengers, Double Full Moon Night) while one makes several references to it (Tranquility Wars).

== Awards ==
In 2006, he was awarded the Masursky Award for Meritorious Service to Planetary Science by the Division for Planetary Sciences of the American Astronomical Society, for his lifetime of contributions to systems engineering of robotic planetary missions.

In 2021, he was elected a member of the National Academy of Engineering for contributions to 20 planetary exploration missions to Mars, Jupiter, asteroids, and comets.

== Bibliography ==
- Cradle (1989) (with Arthur C. Clarke)
- Rama II (1989) (with Arthur C. Clarke)
- The Garden of Rama (1991) (with Arthur C. Clarke)
- Rama Revealed (1993) (with Arthur C. Clarke)
- Bright Messengers (1996)
- Double Full Moon Night (2000)
- Tranquility Wars (2001)
- A History of the Twenty-First Century (2003) (with Michael White)

== Television ==
- Cosmos: A Personal Voyage (1980) (project manager)
- Are We Alone? (2009) (narrator)
- Living Universe: Journey to Another Stars (2018)
