= Rama II (novel) =

1989 novel by Arthur C. Clarke and Gentry Lee

- Dust-jacket from the UK edition
- Author: Gentry Lee & Arthur C. Clarke
- Language: English
- Series: Rama
- Genre: Science fiction
- Publisher: Gollancz
- Publication date: 1989
- Publication place: United Kingdom
- Media type: Print (Hardback & Paperback)
- Pages: 377
- ISBN: 0-575-04545-0
- OCLC: 20852483
- LC Class: PR6005.L36 R36 1989b
- Preceded by: Rendezvous with Rama
- Followed by: The Garden of Rama

Rama II is a science fiction novel by Gentry Lee and Arthur C. Clarke, first published in 1989. It recounts humankind's further interaction with the Ramans, first introduced in Rendezvous with Rama. Written primarily by Lee, Rama II has a distinctly different writing style than the original, with a more character-driven narrative and a closer-to-contemporary mindset, ambience and human relations than the first novel's more futuristic tones. Rama II is the first novel of the "new" Rama series, as Rendezvous with Rama is not always counted as part of it. The Rama series includes two more sequels: The Garden of Rama and Rama Revealed.

== Plot summary ==
Seventy years after the events of Rendezvous with Rama, a second Raman vessel enters the Solar System. Its arrival is expected, and on Earth the chosen crew of twelve readies for the voyage to unlock more of Rama's mysteries. Interpersonal conflicts among crew members begin prior to the launch date.

After arriving, an accident kills the leader of the group while still outside Rama, and there is debate over who the replacement should be. The tools and vehicles the crew bring to Rama, based on knowledge from the first expedition, make exploring Rama easier.

The novel ends with three of the twelve astronauts abandoned inside Rama as it travels out of the Solar System.

== Characters ==
Crew of the Newton:

- Richard Wakefield: British electrical engineer
- Francesca Sabatini: Italian journalist
- David Brown: American scientific leader
- Shigeru Takagishi: Japanese scientist, expert on first Rama craft
- Janos Tabori: Russian cosmonaut
- Valeriy Borzov: Russian General and Rama II mission commander
- Nicole des Jardins: French chief medical and life-sciences officer
- Michael O'Toole: American general
- Irina Turgenyev: Russian cosmonaut and pilot
- Hiro Yamanaka: Japanese cosmonaut and pilot
- Reggie Wilson: American videographer working with Sabatini
- Otto Heilmann: German admiral

== Books in the series ==
- Rendezvous with Rama (1973)
- Rama II (1989)
- The Garden of Rama (1991)
- Rama Revealed (1993)

Gentry Lee also wrote two further novels set in the same Rama Universe.

- Bright Messengers (1996)
- Double Full Moon Night (2000)

== Adaptations ==
=== Video game ===
Sierra Entertainment created Rama in 1996 as a point and click adventure game in the style of Myst. Along with highly detailed graphics, Arthur C. Clarke also appeared in the game as the guide for the player. This game featured characters from Rama II.
