= Welsbach (disambiguation) =

Welsbach is a surname.

Welsbach may also refer to:

- Welsbach Building, a historic building in Downtown Columbus, Ohio
- Welsbach seeding

== See also ==
- Welzbach (disambiguation)
