= Auer (surname) =

Auer ("someone living by a water meadow [Aue]" in German, "haze" in Finnish) is a surname. Notable people with the surname include:

- Alois Auer (1813–1869), Austrian printer, inventor and botanical illustrator
- Augie Auer (1940–2007), New Zealand atmospheric scientist and meteorologist
- Barbara Auer (born 1959), German actress
- Benjamin Auer (born 1981), German soccer player
- Christian Auer (born 1966), Austrian skeleton racer
- Doris Auer (born 1971), Austrian pole vaulter
- Edward Auer (born 1941), American classical pianist
- Florence Auer (1880–1962), American theater and motion picture actress whose career spanned more than five decades
- Franz Auer (1918–1983), Austrian chess master
- Fritz Auer (born 1933), German architect
- Gerhard Auer (1943–2019), German rower
- Gregory M. Auer (1937–1993), American art-director, screenwriter and cameraman
- Hans Auer (1847–1906), Swiss-Austrian architect
- Hansjörg Auer (1984–2019), Austrian mountaineer
- Howie Auer (1908–1985), American football player
- Hubert Auer (born 1981), Austrian footballer
- Ignaz Auer (1846–1907), German politician
- Ilmari Auer (1879–1965), Finnish politician and farmer
- Ingeborg Auer, Austrian climatologist
- Joe Auer (1941–2019), American football running back
- Johann Paul Auer (1636–1687), German painter
- John Auer (1875–1948), American physiologist
- John F. Auer (1866–1951), sailor in the United States Navy
- John H. Auer (1906–1975), film director
- Jon Auer (born 1969), American musician
- Judith Auer (1905–1944), resistance fighter against the Nazi régime in Germany
- Katrin Auer (born 1974), Austrian politician
- Leopold Auer (1845–1930), Hungarian violinist and conductor
- Lucas Auer (born 1994), Austrian racing driver
- Martin Auer (born 1951), Austrian writer
- Martin S. Auer (1918–1991), New York state senator
- Matthew Auer, Dean of the Hutton Honors College at Indiana University in Bloomington, Indiana
- Michael E. Auer (born 1948), German computer scientist
- Mischa Auer (1905–1957), Russian actor and the grandson of Leopold Auer
- Monika Auer (born 1957), Italian luger
- Ron Auer (born 1950), American politician
- Väinö Auer (1895–1981), Finnish geologist and geographer
- Victor Auer (1937–2011), sports shooter

== See also ==
- Auer von Welsbach
- Auer (disambiguation)
