= Auer von Welsbach =

Auer von Welsbach:

- Alois Auer, Ritter von Welsbach
  - Carl Auer, Freiherr (Baron) von Welsbach, son of Alois

== See also ==
- Auer (surname)
- Auer (disambiguation)
- Welsbach
