= Jürgen Pilz =

German mathematician and statistician

- Born: 1951 (age 74–75); Langenau, Germany
- Citizenship: German
- Education: TU Bergakademie Freiberg
- Known for: Bayesian statistics, spatial statistics, experimental design, environmental statistics
- Awards: Humboldt Fellowship (1991–1992)
- Scientific career
- Fields: Statistics, Mathematics, Bayesian statistics, Spatial statistics, Environmental statistics, Experimental design
- Workplaces: Alpen-Adria University Klagenfurt, Carinthia University of Applied Sciences, TU Bergakademie Freiberg, Purdue University, University of Copenhagen, Charles University, University of Augsburg, University of British Columbia, University of Canterbury
- Thesis: (1978)

Jürgen Pilz (born 1951) is a German mathematician and statistician. He is known for work in Bayesian statistics, spatial statistics, experimental design, and environmental statistics. Pilz is Professor Emeritus of Applied Statistics at Alpen-Adria University Klagenfurt and since 2021 Senior Lecturer in the international master's program in applied data science at the Carinthia University of Applied Sciences.

== Early life and education ==
Pilz was born in 1951 in Langenau, Germany. He received a PhD in mathematical statistics in 1978 at the Technical University Bergakademie Freiberg (TU BAF).He completed his habilitation in mathematics at the same university in 1988.

== Career ==
From 1989 to 1993 Pilz was Professor of Mathematical Geology in the Department of Geosciences at TU BAF. In 1991–1992 he held a Humboldt Fellowship at the Free University of Berlin, in the collaborative research program on mathematical geology and geoinformatics.

In 1994 he was appointed professor and chair of applied statistics at Alpen-Adria University (AAU), Austria, where he remained until his retirement in 2020. He served as (founding) head of the Department of Statistics from 2007 to 2015 and again from 2018 to 2019.

Since October 2020 he has been professor emeritus at AAU and since October 2021 senior lecturer at the Carinthia University of Applied Sciences, in the international master's program in applied data science.

Pilz has also held guest professorships at Purdue University, the University of Copenhagen, Charles University, the University of Augsburg, the University of British Columbia, and the University of Canterbury.

== Research ==
Pilz's research covers both methodological and applied statistics, with a focus on Bayesian approaches and spatial data analysis. His main areas of work include Bayesian statistics, spatial statistics, industrial statistics, environmental statistics, experimental design, Bayesian epidemiology, and Bayesian machine learning.

Early in his career, Pilz contributed to the development of Bayesian estimation and experimental design in regression analysis, including work on robust Bayesian designs and optimal design under prior information. He has published extensively on Bayesian kriging, spatial interpolation, prediction under uncertainty in covariance structures, and sampling design for spatially correlated data. His research also includes copula-based geostatistical models and mixture models for spatial dependence in environmental and climate data.

Pilz has applied statistical methods to a range of domains, including environmental science (rainfall and drought analysis, climate model evaluation), epidemiology (disease mapping and cancer rate smoothing), geoscience (landslide risk analysis), agricultural processes (pesticide control, crop yield prediction) and industrial advanced process control, with a particular emphasis on semiconductor manufacturing.

In recent years, his work has included statistical learning and uncertainty estimation in deep neural networks, Bayesian methods for variable selection in regression, ensemble feature selection frameworks, and applications of Bayesian deep learning to point cloud segmentation and image restoration.

He has also taken part in European research projects, such as SECOQC (quantum cryptography networks), INTAMAP (automatic mapping of environmental variables), EPT300 (reliability of semiconductor power devices), and iDev40 (Bayesian deep learning for industrial applications).

Pilz has supervised 45 PhD students and more than 100 Master students.

== Selected publications ==
=== Books ===
- Rasch, Dieter; Pilz, Jurgen; Verdooren, L.R.; Gebhardt, Albrecht (2011-05-18). Optimal Experimental Design with R. Chapman and Hall/CRC. doi:10.1201/b10934. ISBN 978-0-429-07557-5.
- Rasch, Dieter; Verdooren, Rob; Pilz, Jürgen (2019-08-16). Applied Statistics. Wiley. doi:10.1002/9781119551584. ISBN 978-1-119-55152-2.

=== Edited books and volumes ===
- "Statistical Modeling and Simulation for Experimental Design and Machine Learning Applications | springerprofessional.de". www.springerprofessional.de.
- Ouyang, Xiao; Wang, Xue-Chao; Veintimilla, Salvador Garcia-Ayllon; Pilz, Juergen (2024-02-09). Territorial Spatial Evolution Process and its Ecological Resilience. Frontiers Media SA. ISBN 978-2-8325-4454-9.
- Pilz, Jürgen; Melas, Viatcheslav B.; Bathke, Arne: Statistical Modeling and Simulation for Experimental Design and Machine Learning Applications. Spinger
