= Michael E. Auer =

German computer scientist

Michael E. Auer (born 1948 in Weimar) is a German computer scientist and engineering educator and professor at the Carinthia University of Applied Sciences, Austria.

He is the head of the Center of Competence (CoC) Online Laboratories at Carinthia University of Applied Sciences and serves as President of the International Federation of Engineering Education Societies (IFEES) until 2018. In June 2006, Michael Auer was elected as President and CEO of the International Association of Online Engineering (IAOE). He is founder and chair of the annual International Conference Interactive Computer aided Learning (ICL) in Villach / Austria, chair of the steering committee of the annual International Conference Remote Engineering and Virtual Instrumentation (REV). Under his guidance, international teams developed a Joint European Master Study Program Remote Engineering (EU project MARE) and a Joint European Bachelor Study Program Information Technology (EU project BIT2010). He is editor-in-chief of the International Journals of Online Engineering (iJOE), Emerging Technologies in Learning (iJET), and Interactive Mobile Technologies (iJIM). He also acts as an associated editor for Middle and Eastern Europe of the European Journal of Open and Distance Learning (EURODL).

Michael E. Auer received his Ing. degree (1971) and his Ph.D. degree (1975) with a thesis on "Design and Analysis of ECL Circuits" from Dresden University of Technology. From 1974-91, he was an assistant at the faculties Electrical Engineering and Informatics of this University. From 1991-95, he was with F+O Electronic Systems GmbH, Heidelberg (Head of software department). His research was related to high-speed digital circuits (ECL), real time and network programming, embedded systems, system- and network administration of heterogeneous networks, telelearning/teleteaching, and remote working environments. In 1995, Michael Auer was appointed Professor of Electrical Engineering of the School of Electronics at Carinthia University of Applied Sciences, Villach, Austria and had also a teaching position at the University of Klagenfurt. He works as a visiting professor at the Universities of Amman (Jordan), Braşov (Romania), and Patras (Greece).
