= Carlo Weber =

German architect and professor

Carlo Weber (born 6 April 1934 in Saarbrücken, Germany, died 15 May 2014) was a German architect and professor, the founder and senior partner of Auer+Weber+Assoziierte.

== Career ==
- 1953–1961 studied and graduated at TH Stuttgart (Stuttgart University)
- 1959–1960 Scholarship to the École nationale supérieure des Beaux-Arts, Paris
- 1962 graduated from TH Stuttgart
- 1960–1965 Behnisch and Lambart, Stuttgart
- 1965 Yamasaki+Associates, Birmingham, Michigan, USA
- 1966–1979 Partner in Behnisch & Partner, and designed Olympiapark with Günter Behnisch and Fritz Auer in Munich
- since 1980 Office Auer+Weber with Fritz Auer
- 1985–1992 Lecturer of Stuttgart University
- 1993–2001 Professor of Dresden University of Technology
- since 1996 Member of Sächsische Akademie der Künste

== See also ==
- Auer+Weber+Assoziierte
- Fritz Auer
