= Welzbach =

Welzbach may refer to:

- Welzbach (Rhine), a river of Rhineland-Palatinate, Germany, tributary of the Rhine
- Welzbach (Main), a river of Bavaria and of Hesse, Germany, tributary of the Main
- Welzbach (Tauber), a river of Baden-Württemberg and of Bavaria, Germany, tributary of the Tauber
