= Red Roof Inn =

Economy motel chain

Red Roof Inns Inc.
- Type: Subsidiary
- Industry: Hospitality; Hotel
- Founded: 1973; 53 years ago
- Founder: Jim Trueman
- Headquarters: 7815 Walton Parkway, New Albany, Ohio, U.S.
- Number of locations: Over 600
- Area served: United States, Canada, Brazil, Japan
- Key people: Zack Gharib, President
- Owner: Red Roof Inns, Inc.
- Number of employees: 525
- Parent: WRRH Investments LP
- Subsidiaries: Red Roof Franchising, LLC.
- Website: redroof.com

Red Roof Inn is an American economy hotel chain based in the United States with over 600 properties globally, primarily in the Midwest, Southern, and Eastern United States. Red Roof Inn is a pet-friendly hotel chain.

== History ==
=== Foundation and early years ===
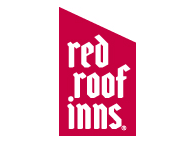
The original logo of Red Roof Inns, in use from 1973–2004

The earliest iteration of the Red Roof Inn was founded in Columbus, Ohio, in 1973. Its founder was American businessman and automobile racing team owner Jim Trueman. Trueman died in 1986. The company remained in the hands of the Trueman family for eight years after his death.

In 1994, The Morgan Stanley Real Estate Fund purchased Red Roof from the Trueman family. In 1997, they began to franchise the company with their first franchised location in Branson, Missouri. In 1999, the company was purchased from the Morgan Stanley Real Estate Fund by French hospitality management company Accor. At the time of the purchase, the Red Roof Inn had 324 locations and 37,208 rooms.

Accor, which owned various hotel brands including Motel 6, purchased the Red Roof Inn for $1.115 billion. As a result of the purchase, Accor became the third largest chain in guestrooms worldwide at the time.

In April 2007, Accor announced the sale of Red Roof Inn to Citigroup Global Special Situations Group and Westbridge Hospitality Fund LP for $1.3 billion. As part of the sale, some locations were converted to Accor's other North American brand, Motel 6. Accor planned to focus their efforts in the North American accommodation market exclusively on the Motel 6 brand after the sale was complete.

In 2013, the company began a $150 million investment to upgrade and renovate the existing hotels nationwide with the new NextGen room design. The NextGen design featured wood-like flooring, upgraded bedding, wireless internet, flat screen TVs, granite countertops, and vessel sinks in the bathroom. To coincide with the 40th anniversary of the launch of the brand, a semi truck with an exact model of the new room type toured the country.

After the sale from Accor, the franchising unit was placed into a separate business entity, Red Roof Franchising, LLC, in 2021.

=== Corporate property management spin-off ===
Since inception, Red Roof Inn has owned and managed a number of properties directly. With the purchase of the brand from Accor, individual inns were placed into portfolios purchased by investment groups such as Five Mile Capital Partners, LLC., while Red Roof retained management by 2021.

Through sales of individual inns for various reasons, the managed properties were whittled down to 67 by September 2020, when they were removed from under the Red Roof Inn Inc. umbrella and managed by a newly formed entity named RRI West Management, LLC. Some administrative functions remained in New Albany, Ohio, while others moved to El Cajon, California. RRI West became the single largest franchisee of the Red Roof brand.

=== International expansion ===
Red Roof opened its first international location in Brazil in September 2015. The Curitiba, Brazil hotel was followed by the opening of a second hotel in Vitoria, Brazil, which opened in April 2016 in partnership with the Brazil-based Nobile Hotels. Red Roof Franchising, LLC, working along with Nobile, plans on developing 35-40 properties across Brazil over the next 25 years. In July 2016, Red Roof expanded to Japan by opening a hotel in the Namba area of Osaka, Japan.

In partnership with Paragon Hotels, Red Roof planned on opening a series of new-build hotels in major tourist locations across Thailand. That deal has since failed to materialize. The hotel brand, partnered with FANS International Hospitality Group, intends to grow the brand starting with a location in Calgary, Alberta. This is the first of multiple hotel properties planned to be converted in Canada over the next five years.

== Brands ==
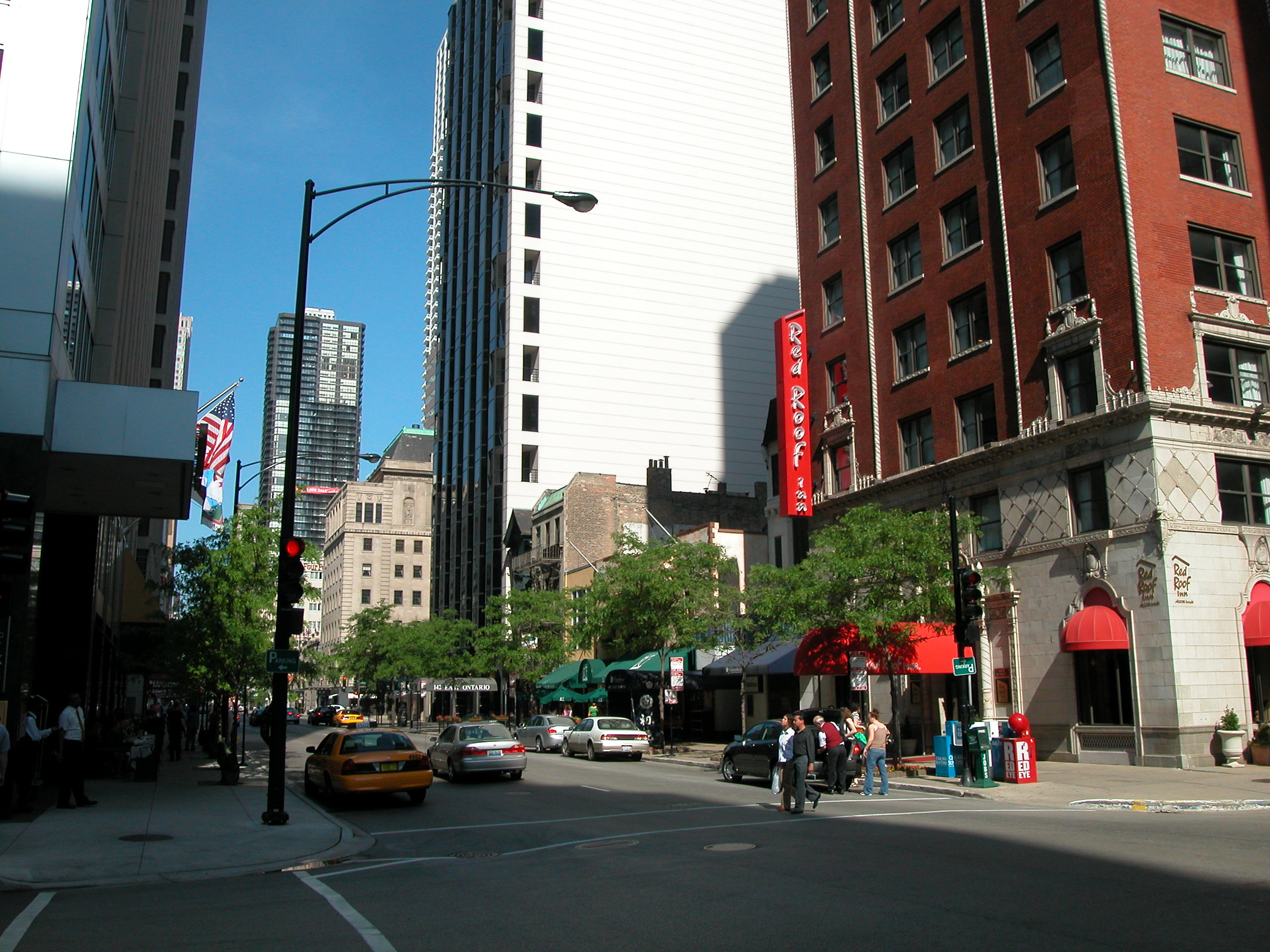
Red Roof Inn in Chicago

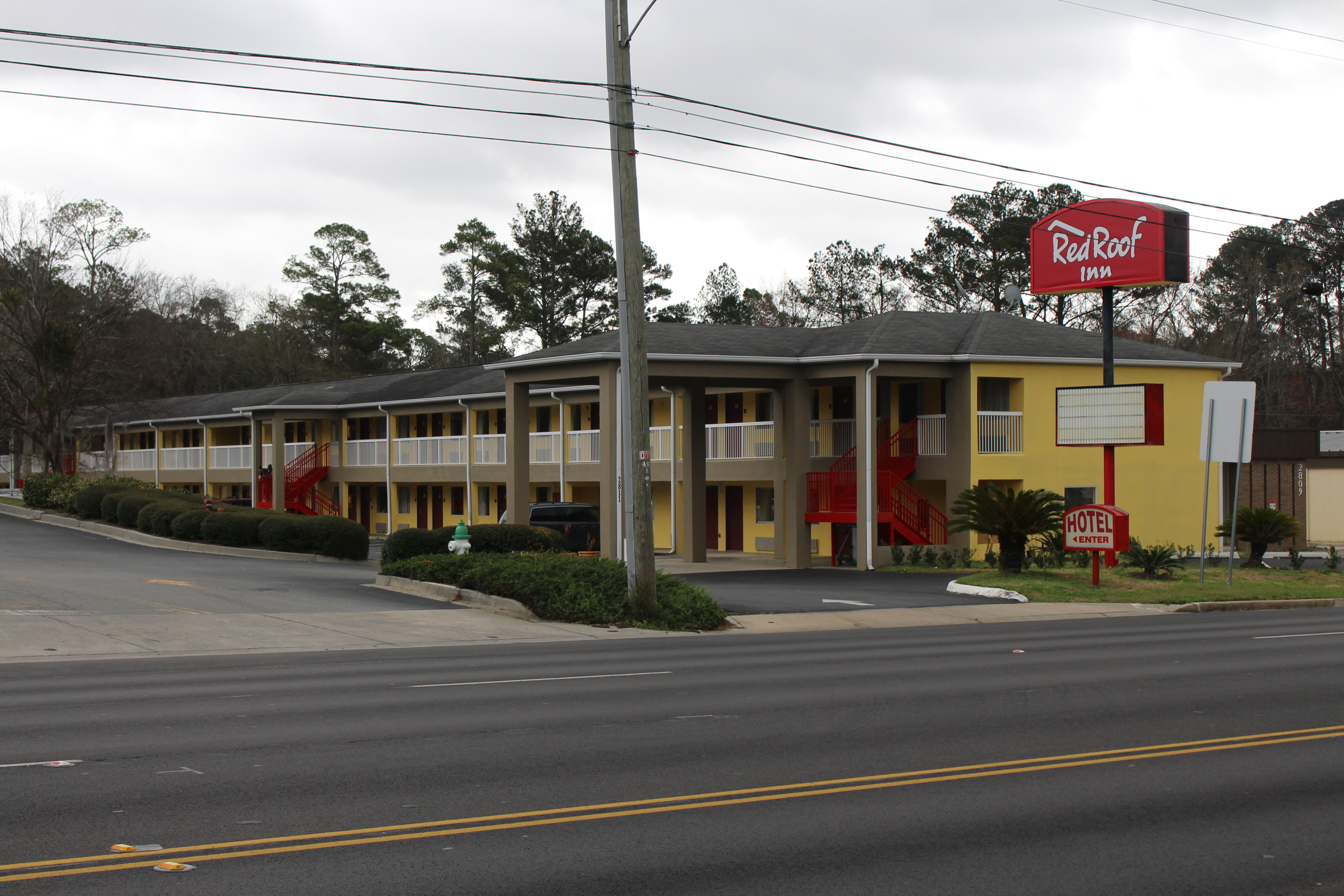
Red Roof Inn in Valdosta

Red Roof Inn
The first Red Roof Inn location opened in Columbus, Ohio in 1973, charging guests just $8.50 a night.

Red Roof PLUS+
Red Roof PLUS+ was launched in early 2014, as a higher-tier extension and not a separate brand. The Red Roof Plus concept is labelled as "Upscale Economy." In addition to the all new "NextGen" design, the Plus+ property offers a select number of Premium Rooms that feature additional amenities such as upgraded bath towels, high end bedding, Seattle's Best in-room coffee, and a snack box with water, orange juice, popcorn, trail mix and granola bars. The Red Roof PLUS+ is highlighted by a bright red lighted canopy at the entrance to the lobby.

The Red Collection
In 2018, Red Roof announced the launch of their first soft brand, The Red Collection, a chain of midscale hotels in downtown urban areas featuring modern decor inspired by the city where it is located. The flagship location, The St. Clair Hotel - Magnificent Mile, opened in 2018 in Downtown Chicago. The brand quickly expanded to include State House Inn in Springfield, Illinois and Lord & Moris Times Square Hotel in New York City. In June 2020, The State House Inn left The Red Collection and joined Trademark By Wyndham association.

HomeTowne Studios by Red Roof
In 2018, Red Roof Inn launched HomeTowne Studios by Red Roof, which is a brand with a focus on accommodating longer-term guests. Formerly Crossland Economy Studios, and then Home Towne Suites, HomeTowne Studios by Red Roof underwent a phased launch of over 30 properties across more than 20 markets with nearly 4,000 rooms. As of 2021, there are 54 locations.

== Controversies and legal issues ==
=== Sex trafficking negligence lawsuits ===
The Red Roof Inn corporation has had several legal cases involving their alleged negligence towards sex trafficking victims that were brought into their hotels. According to The Independent, the chain is undergoing 42 federal lawsuits as of July 2024. These lawsuits allege, amongst a series of serious allegations, that the company "...turned a blind eye and profited from [sex trafficker's] abuse for years."

Another lawsuit, which related to similar alleged conduct by the company from 2009 to 2018, was settled in June 2024.

== See also ==
- List of hotels
- List of motels
- Welsbach Building
