= Auer+Weber+Assoziierte =

German architectural firm

- Type: GmbH
- Founded: 2006 (since 1980)
- Headquarters: Stuttgart and Munich, Germany
- Key people: Fritz Auer, Carlo Weber
- Products: Architecture, Urban design
- Number of employees: 70-80
- Website: www.auer-weber.de

Auer+Weber+Assoziierte is a German architecture firm, founded and headquartered in Stuttgart and Munich, Germany in 1980. The founders are Fritz Auer (born 24 June 1933), and Carlo Weber (6 April 1934-15 May 2014).

== History ==
The architect's office "Auer+Weber" was established in 1980 by Fritz Auer and Carlo Weber, emerged from Behnisch & Partner, to which both architects belonged between 1966 and 1979. Meantime, it was also named as "Auer+Weber+Partners" (1991-2001) and "Auer+Weber+Architects" (2001-2005). From spring 2006, the office was known under the name of Auer+Weber+Associates Ltd.. Today, the office has about 80 employees.

== Selected Projects ==
=== Completed ===
- 1983 Kurgast Center in Bad Salzuflen, Nordrhein-Westfalen, Germany
- 1986 Foster home in Lemgo, North Rhine-Westphalia, Germany
- 1989 Cafeteria in Ulm University
- 1991 Administration buildings in Munich Airport, Germany
- 1991 Administration buildings of public services in Reutlingen, Baden-Württemberg, Germany
- 1994 Theater in Hof (Saale), Bavaria, Germany
- 1996 Block of offices Prisma in Frankfurt a.M., Germany
- 1998 Zeppelin Carré in Stuttgart, Germany
- 1998 Extension and reconstruction of the city theater in Recklinghausen, Germany
- 2001 Reconstruction of Ruhrfestspielhaus in Recklinghausen, Germany
- 2001 German State Central Bank in Sachsen-Anhalt, Halberstadt, Germany
- 2001 Canopy of central station plaza in Heilbronn, Baden-Württemberg, Germany
- 2003 Hotel ESO Cerro Paranal, Chile
- 2005 Commendation exhibition building "Brühlsche Terrasse" in Dresden, Germany
- 2005 solarCity Linz, Austria
- 2006 Würzburg Central Station, Germany
- 2013 ESO Headquarters Extension, Garching, Germany
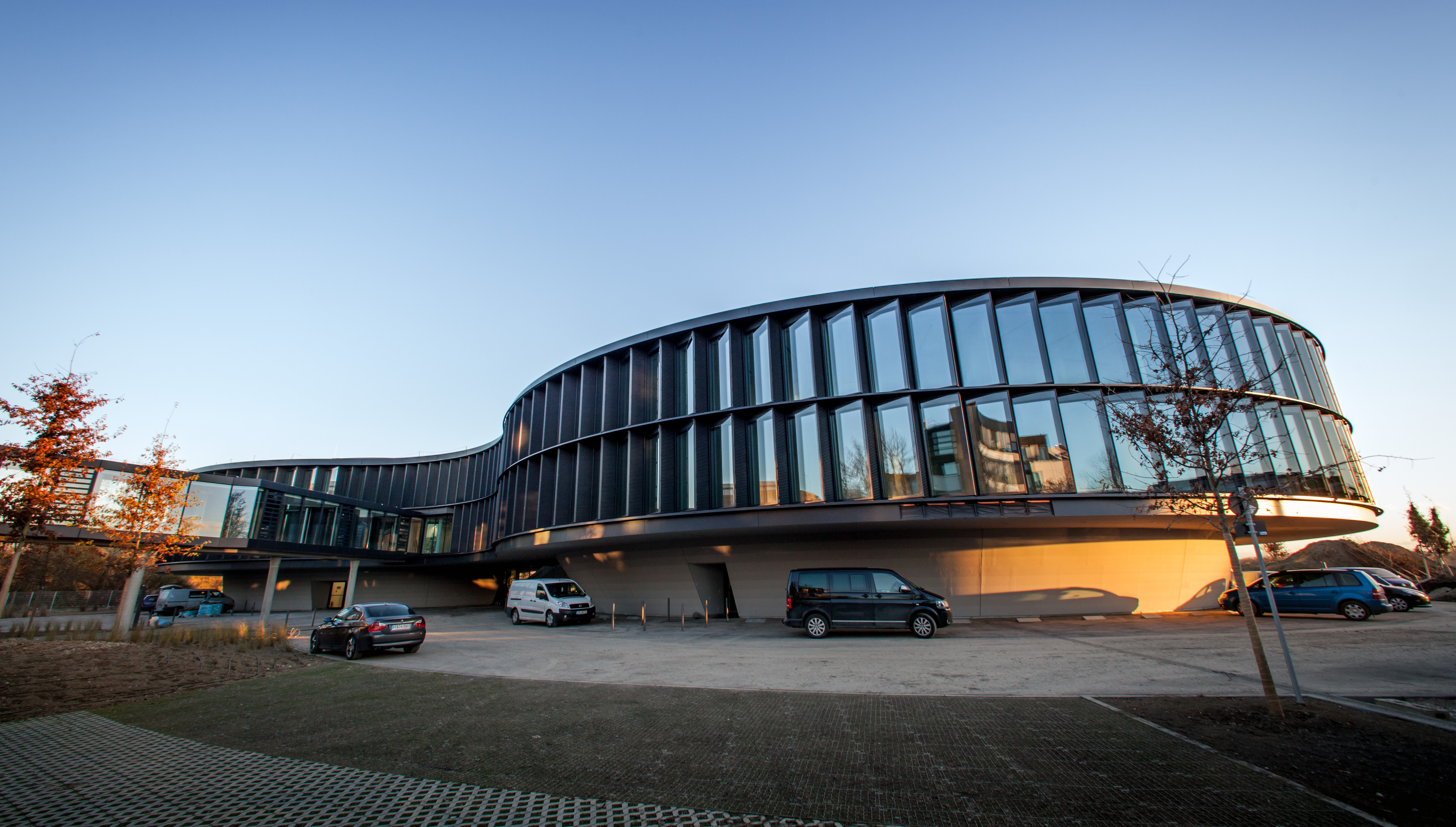
The new ESO Headquarters extension, 2013

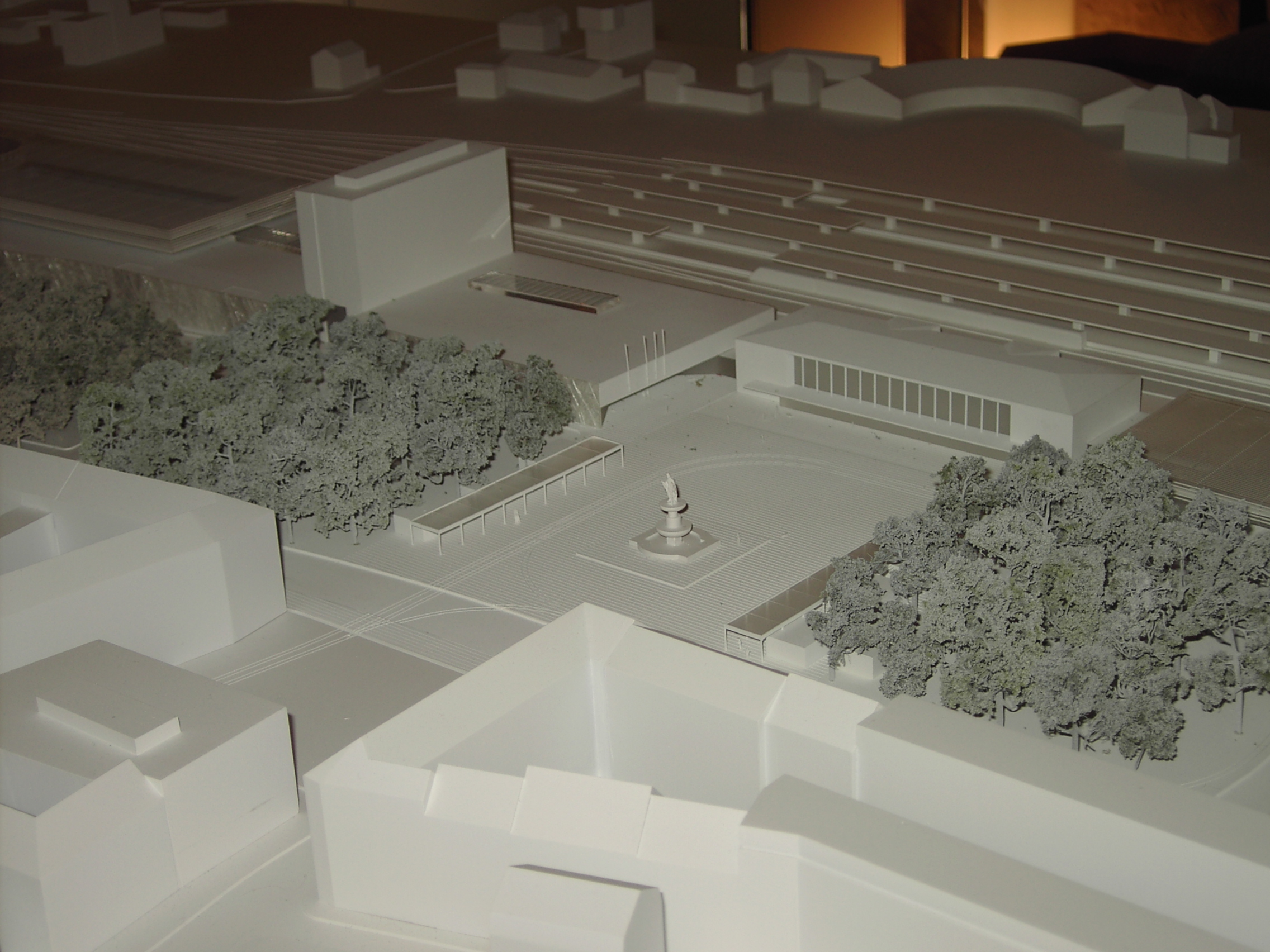
Reform of Würzburg Central Station, 2006

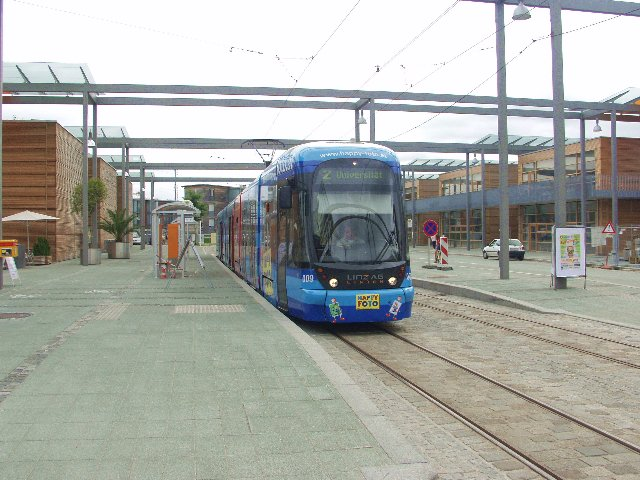
Tram stage in center of solarCity Linz, 2005

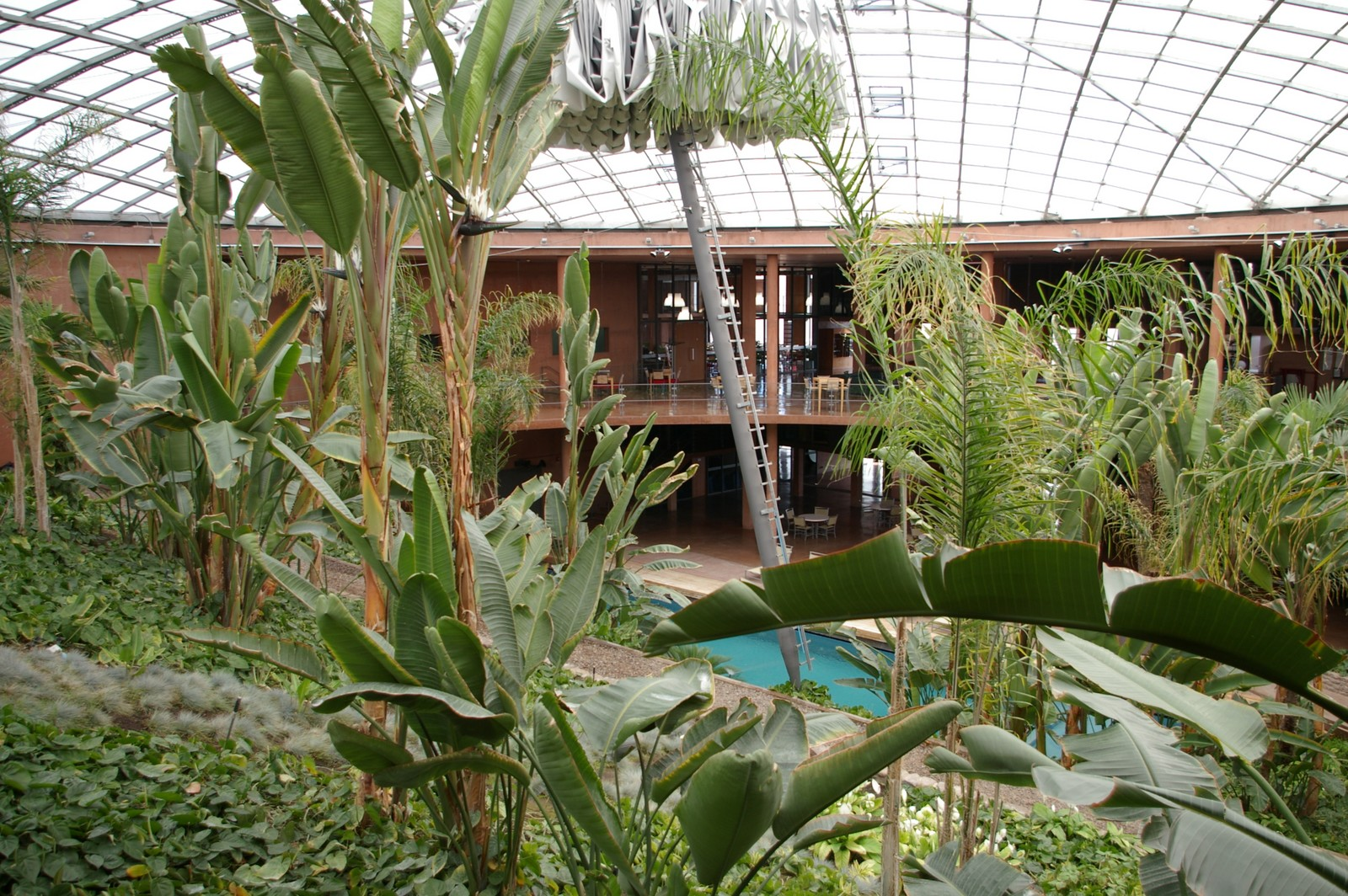
The Garden of the Residencia in ESO Hotel, 2003

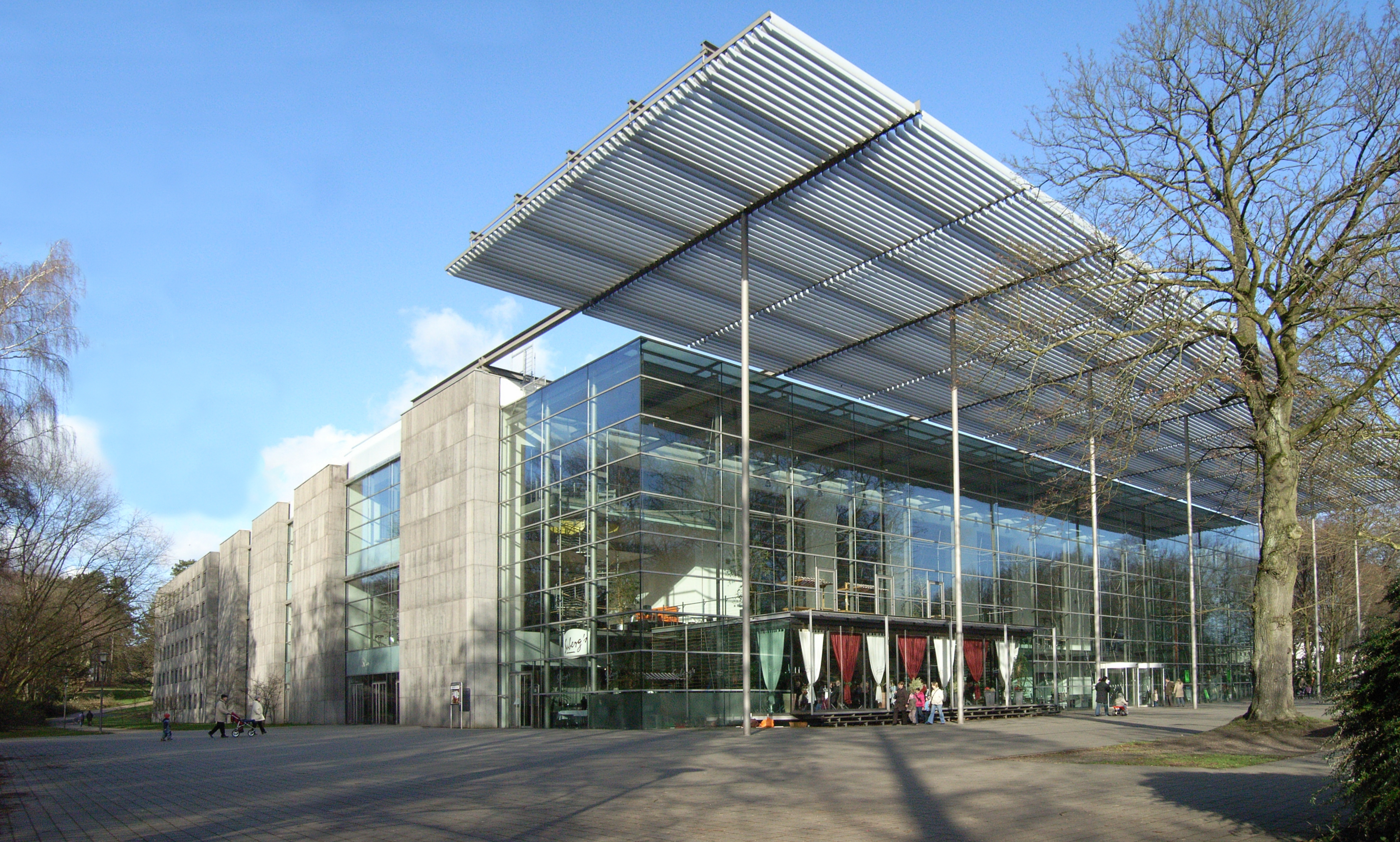
Ruhrfestspielhaus in Recklinghausen, 2001

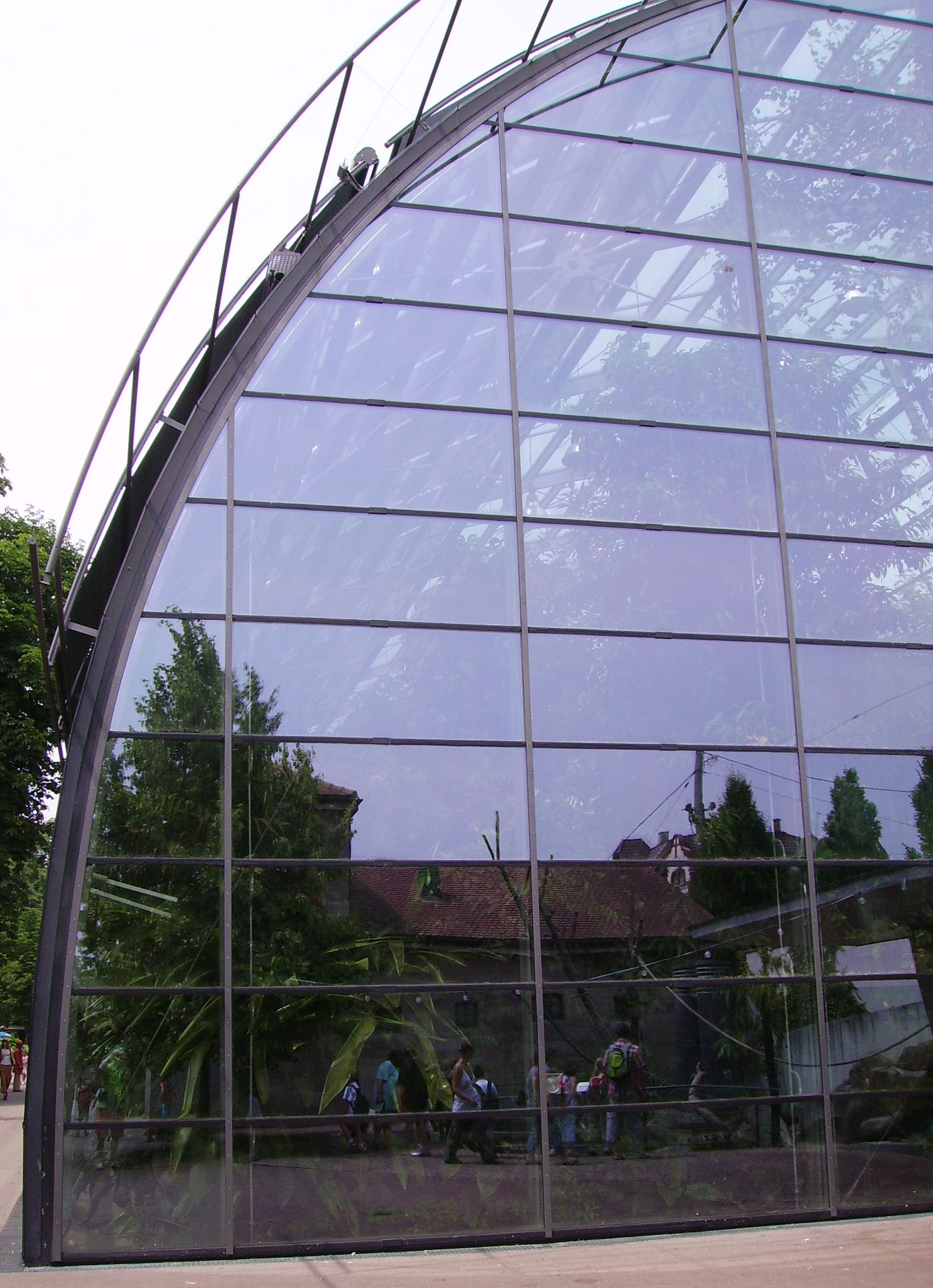
Amazonia House in Wilhelma, 1999

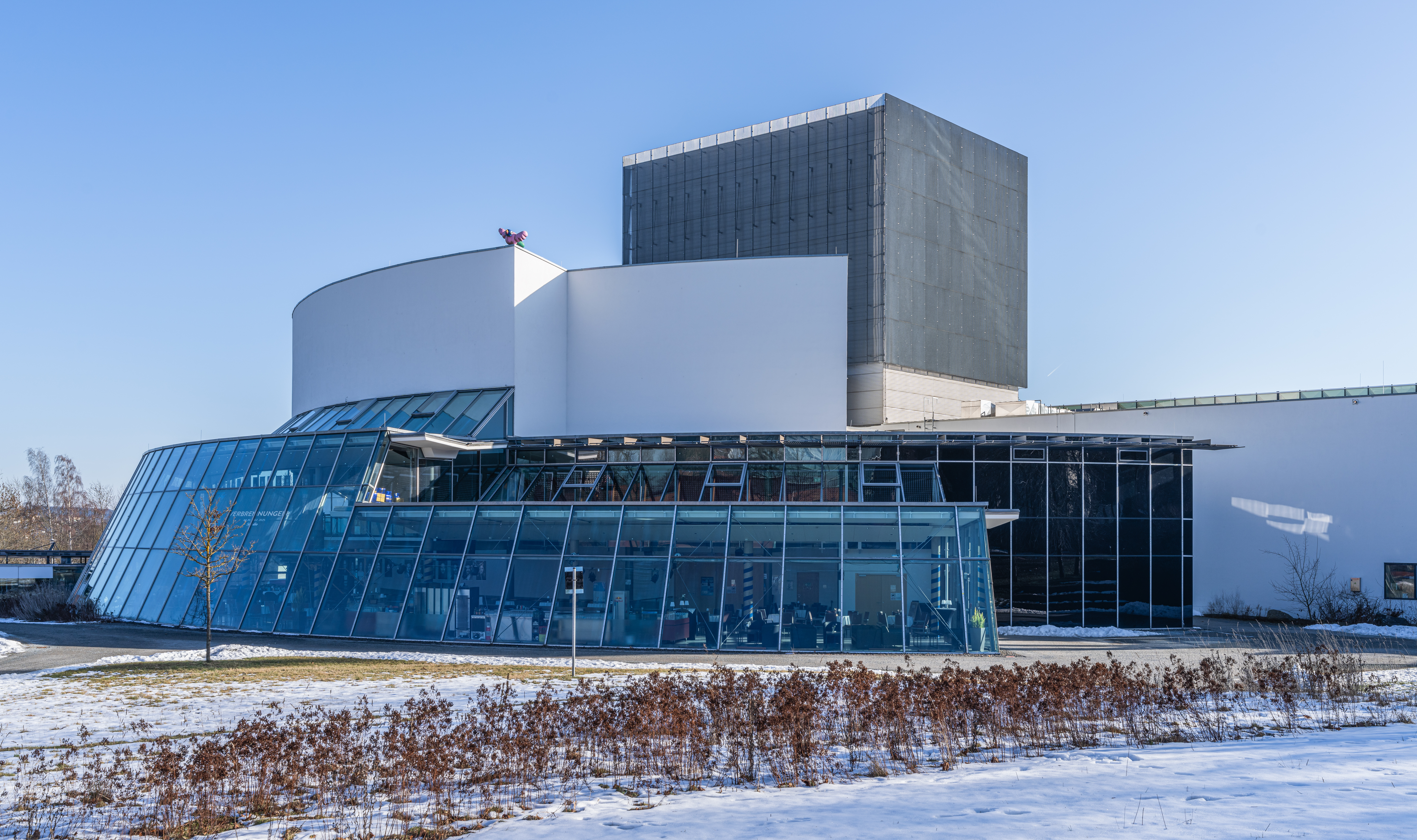
Theater in Hof (Saale), 1994

=== Current ===
- Olympiahalle in Munich additions and alterations, Germany (approx. 2008)
- Campus Martinsried, Munich, Germany (approx. 2008)
- Facade Haerder-Center Lübeck, Germany (approx. 2008)
- Munich Central Bus Station, Germany (approx. 2009)
- Centre des Sports Belair, Luxembourg (approx. 2009)
- Botanical Garden "Chenshan", Shanghai, China (approx. 2009)
- Seniors Residence, Regensburg, Germany (approx. 2010)

== Awards ==
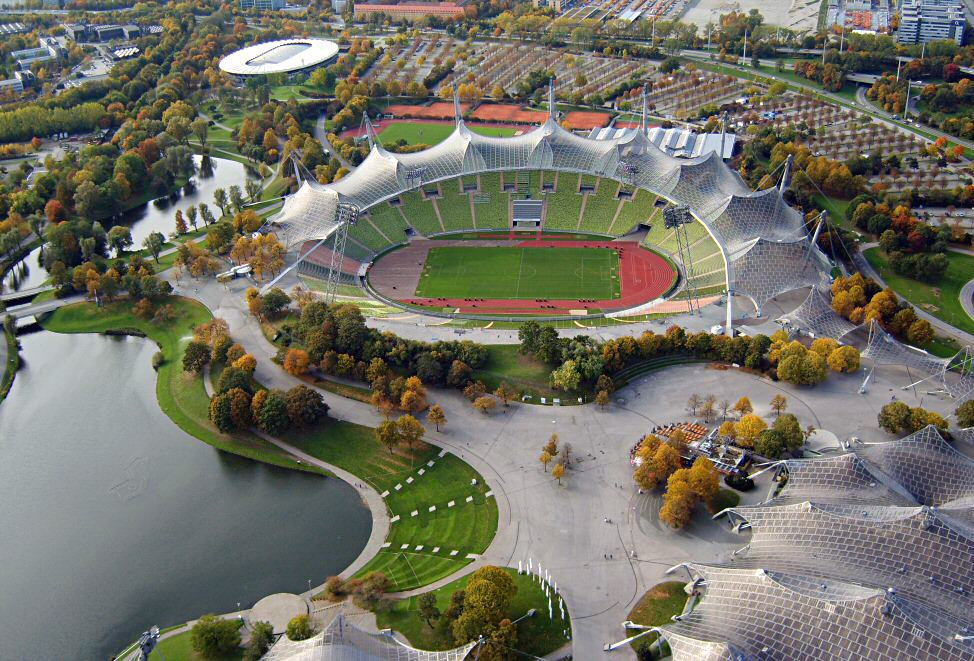
Olympic Stadium (Munich)

- 1972 I.C.P. Award of Honor, Hugo Häring Award*
- 1972 Architecture Award from the German Association of Architects (BDA)*
- 1981 International Architecture Award from the UIA (International Union of Architects), Auguste Perret Award*
  Project: Sports grounds and buildings for the Olympic Games 1972 in Munich, Germany
- 1989 German Architecture Award
  Project: Landratsamt in Starnberg, Germany
- 1991 Fritz Schumacher Award
- 1991 German critics' Architecture Award
  Project: German Pavilion, Seville Expo '92, Spain
- 1995 German Architecture Award, official recognition
  Project: Theater in Hof, Germany
- 2001 German Architecture Award
  Project: Ruhrfestspielhaus in Recklinghausen, Germany
- 2007 German Architecture Award
  Project: Commendation exhibition building "Brühlsche Terrasse" in Dresden, Germany
- 2005 LEAF Award, "Best Environmentally Sustainable Project"
  Project: solarCity Center Linz- Pichling, Austria
- 2004 LEAF Award, category "New Build"+"Overall"
  Project: Hotel ESO Cerro Paranal, Chile

* as partners in Behnisch & Partner
