= ESO Hotel =

Coordinates: 24°38′25″S 70°23′18″W

ESO Hotel at Cerro Paranal
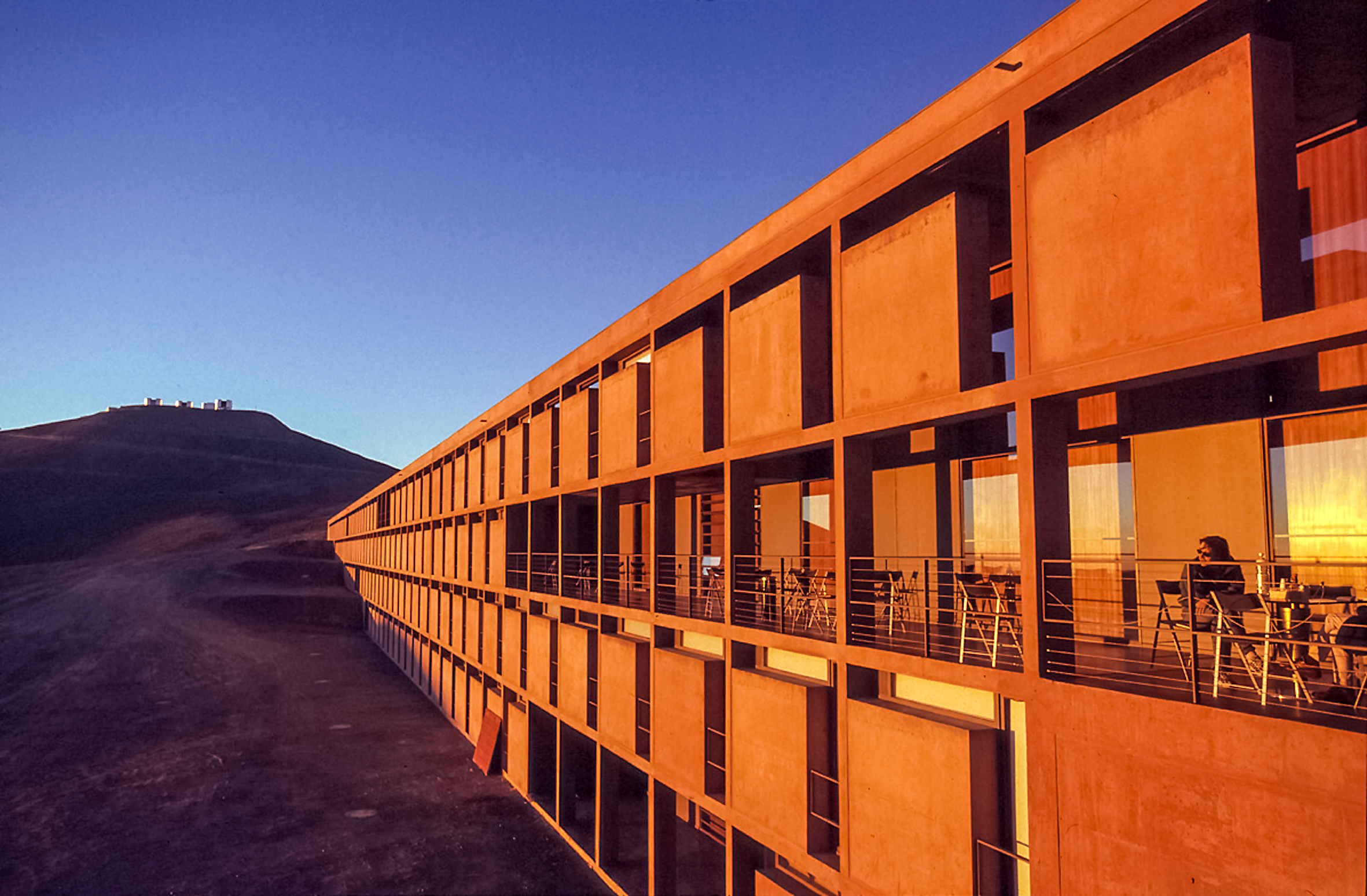
- Southwest facade of the hotel at dusk

General information
- Type: Hotel
- Location: Chile

Website
- www.eso.org/public/about-eso/travel/paranal/

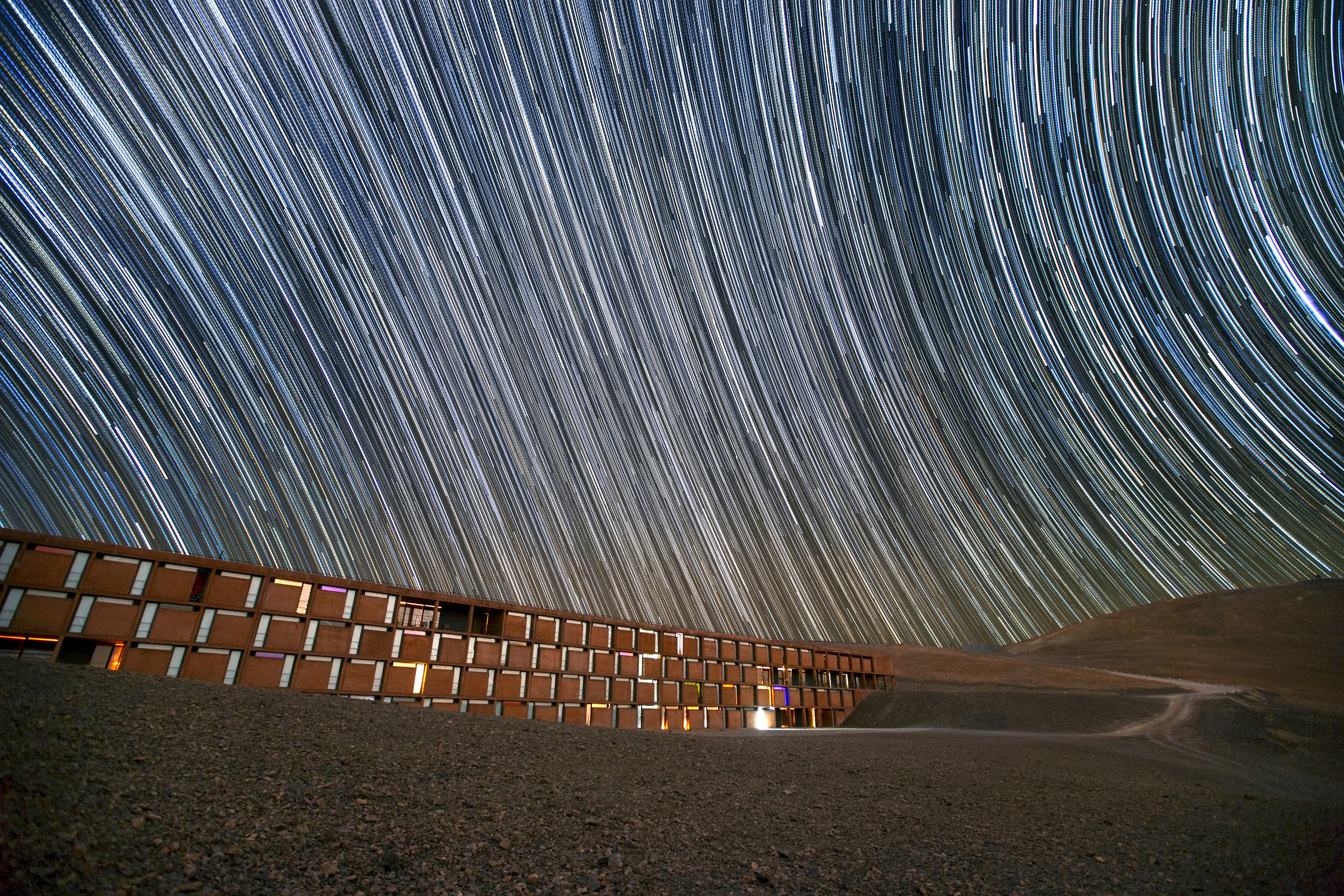
Star trails over the remote ESO Hotel (Paranal Residencia) in Chile

ESO Hotel at Cerro Paranal (or Residencia) is the accommodation for Paranal Observatory in Chile since 2002. It is mainly used for the European Southern Observatory (ESO) scientists and engineers who work there on a roster system. It is also used by workers building the Extremely Large Telescope 23 km away. It has been called a "boarding house on Mars", because the desert surroundings are Mars-like, and an "Oasis for astronomers". It is not a commercial hotel, and the public cannot book rooms.

The architect was the Chilean-born Hernán Marchant, a current professor and associate dean at North Carolina State University, the architecture firm was Auer+Weber+Assoziierte of Germany and constructor was Vial y Vives Ltda. of Chile. It won the Cityscape Architectural Review Awards in 2005. In 2004 it won the new and overall LEAF Awards.

== Location ==
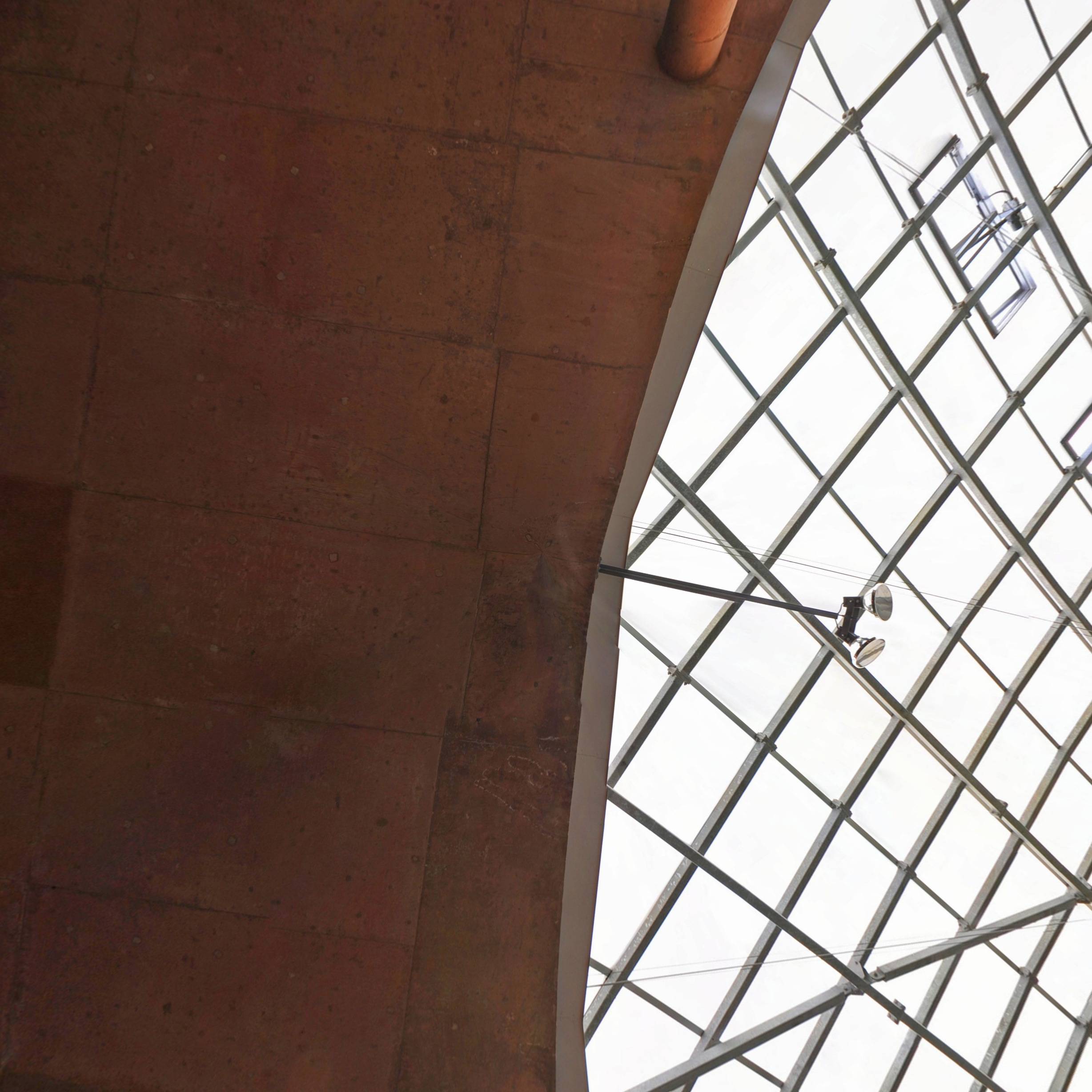
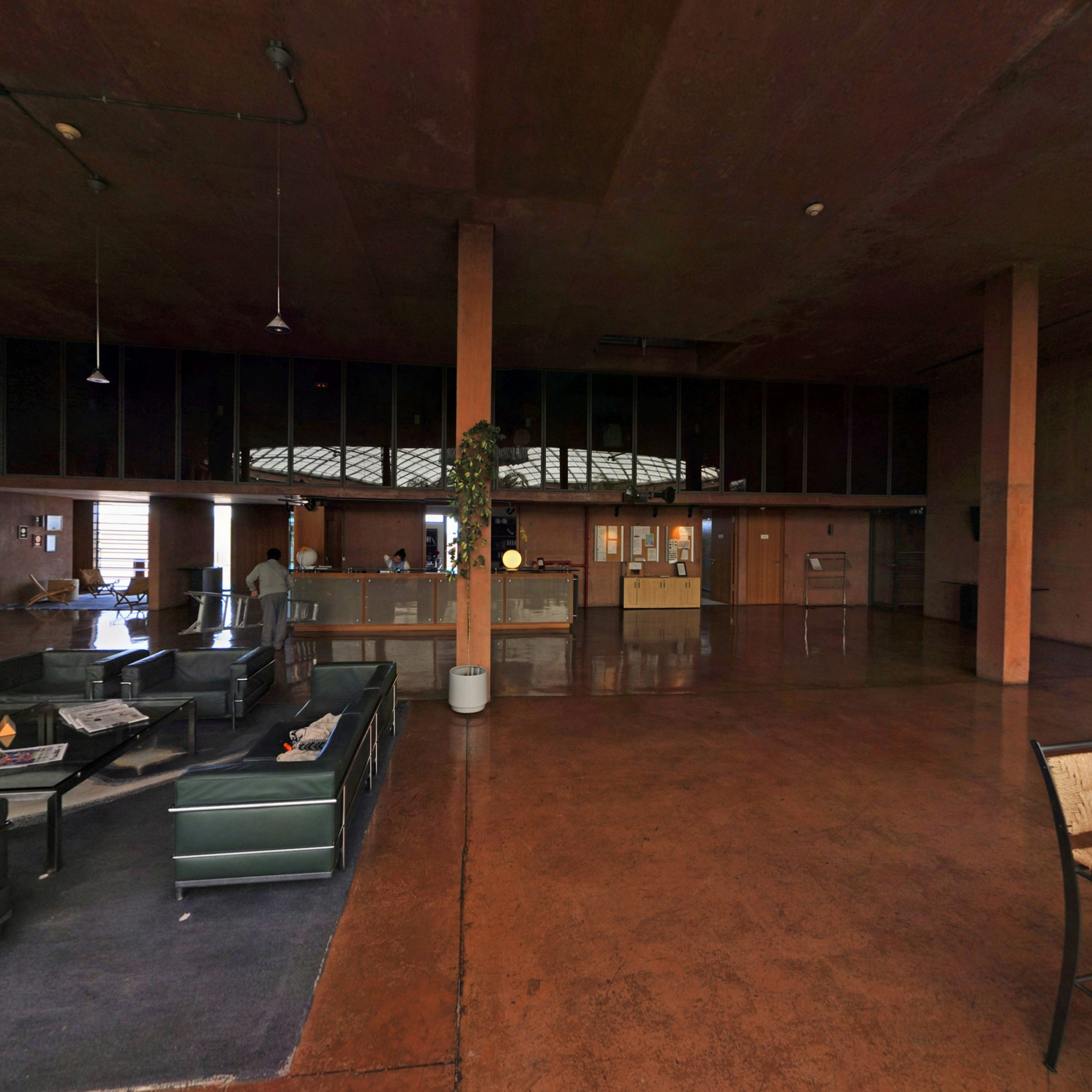
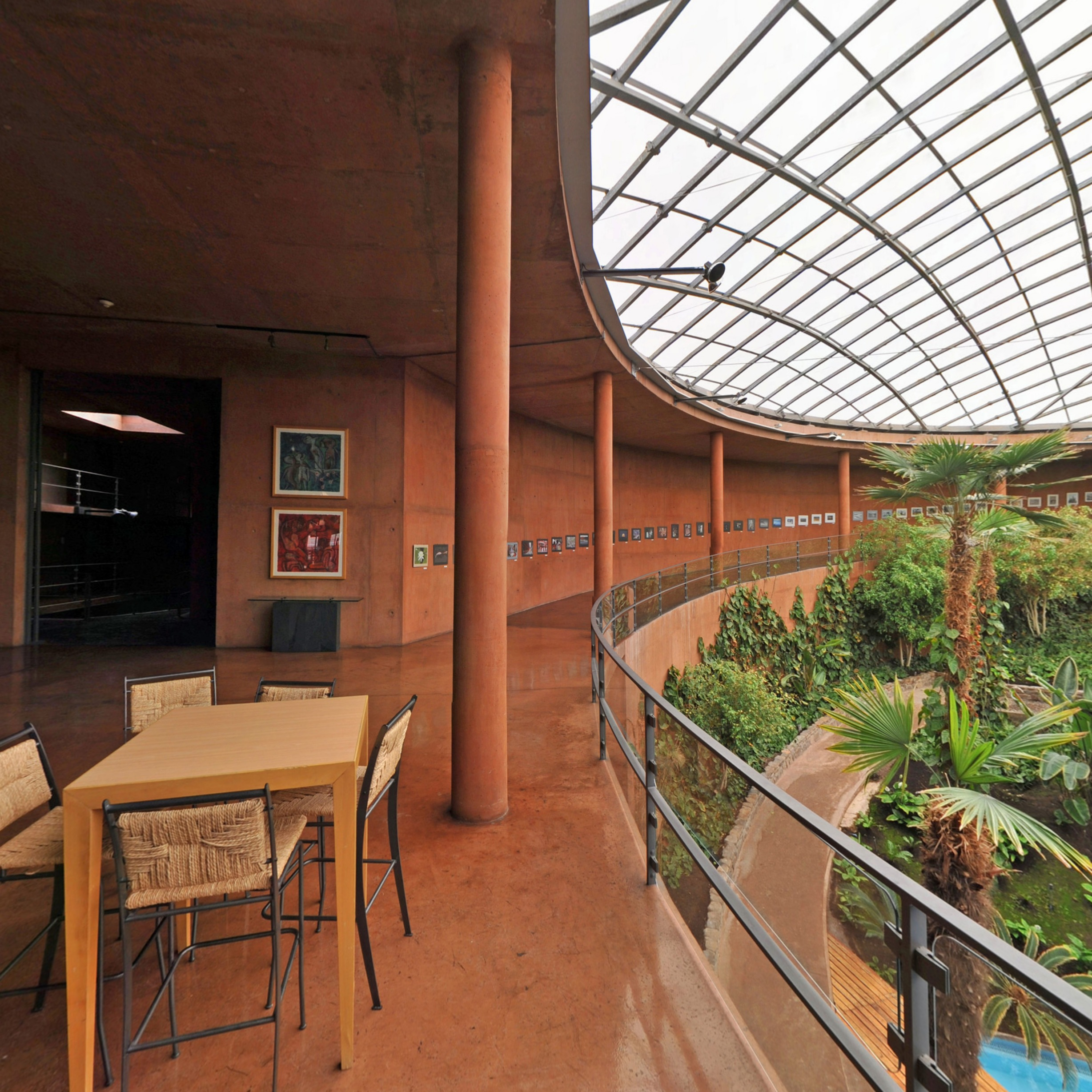
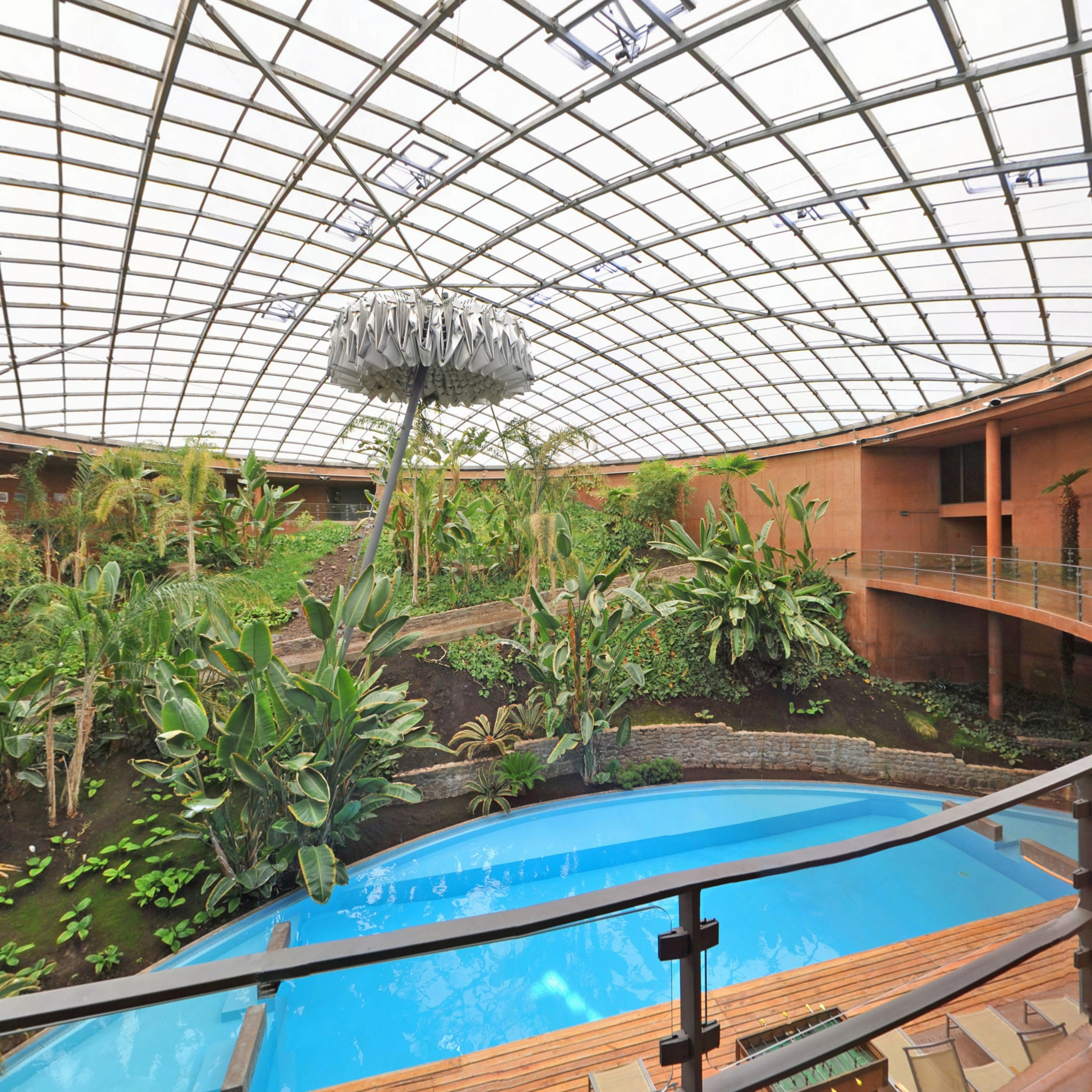
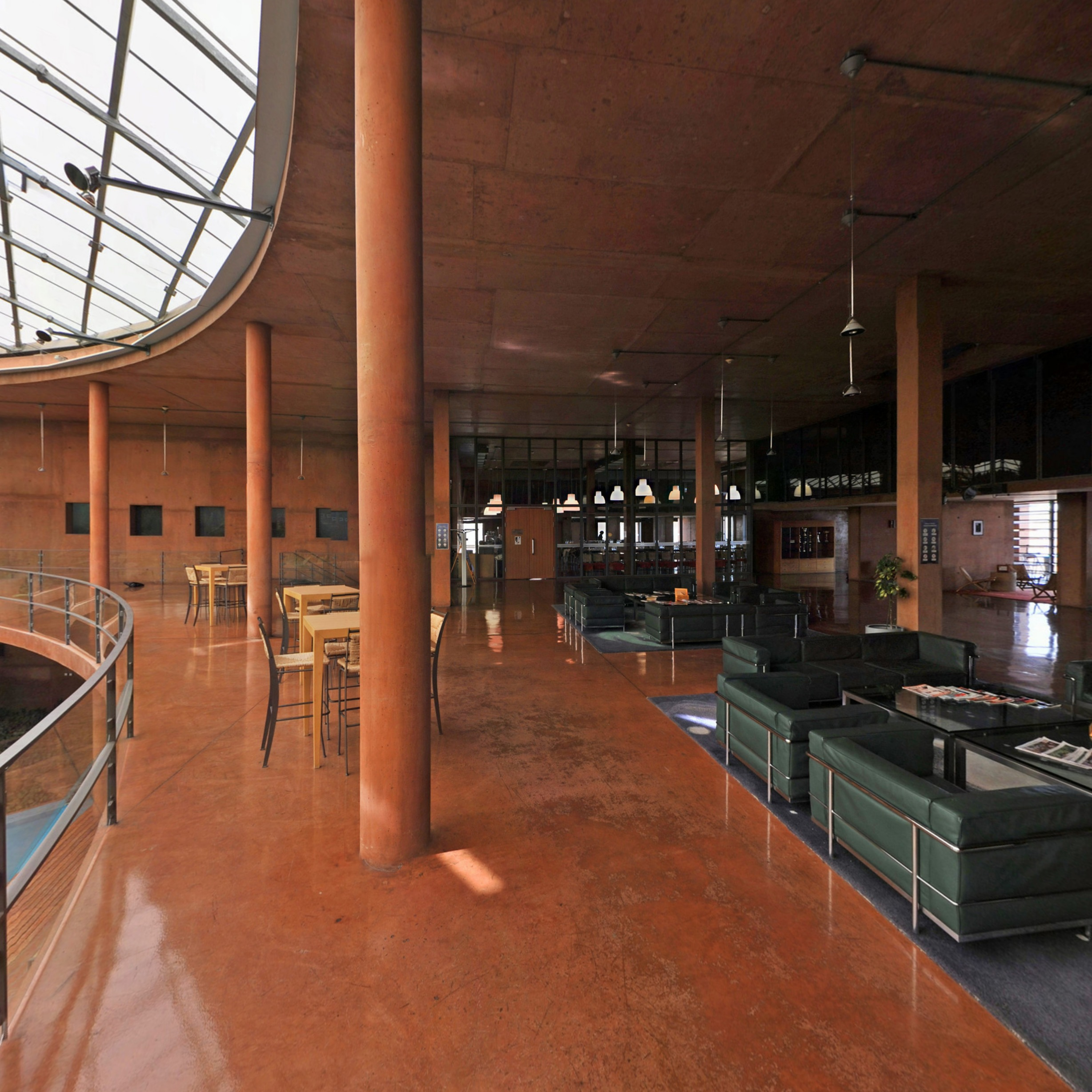
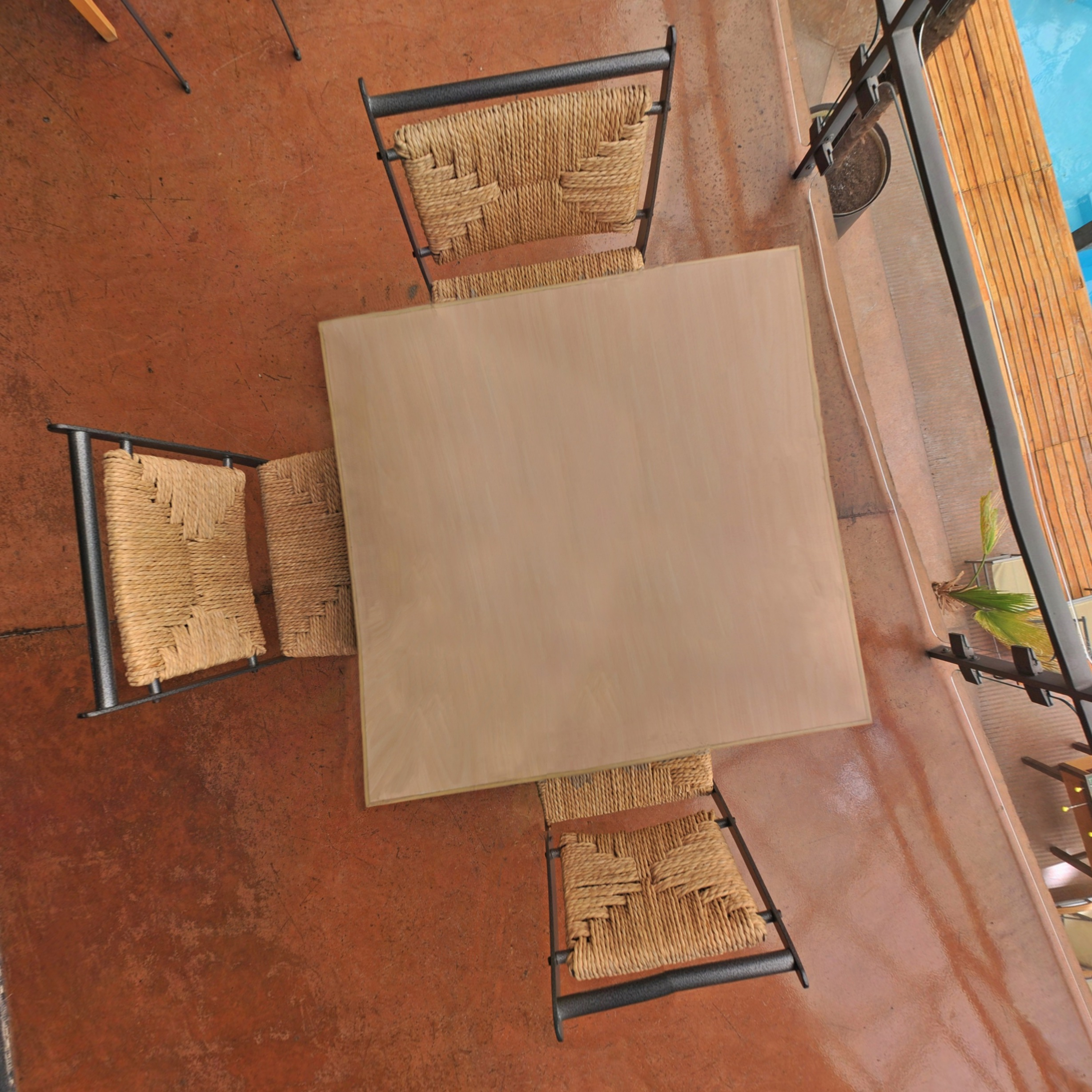
Inside panorama view.

The hotel is at 2,400 meters (7,900 ft) above sea level on Cerro Paranal. The people there work in extreme climatic conditions including intense sunlight, dryness, high wind speeds and great fluctuations in temperature. To protect against these an artificial oasis was built to allow respite between shifts.

The total area is 10,000 m², with an L-shape of 176 m × 53 m. It has 4 levels, 1,000 m² of gardens, 108 rooms, and 18 offices. It includes a restaurant, music room, library, swimming pool, and sauna. Its inauguration was in February 2002.

The hotel complex, comprising four levels, fits into an existing depression in the ground. There are views across the desert to the Pacific Ocean from each of the 120 rooms and also from the dining room veranda. Also visible is a slightly raised dome comprising a steel skeleton that measures 35 meters (115 ft) in diameter.

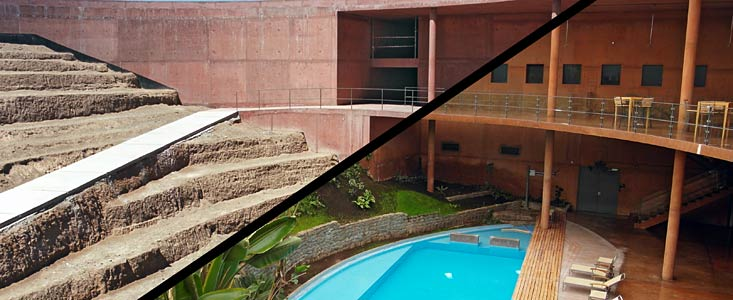
The Residencia under construction at the end of 2000.

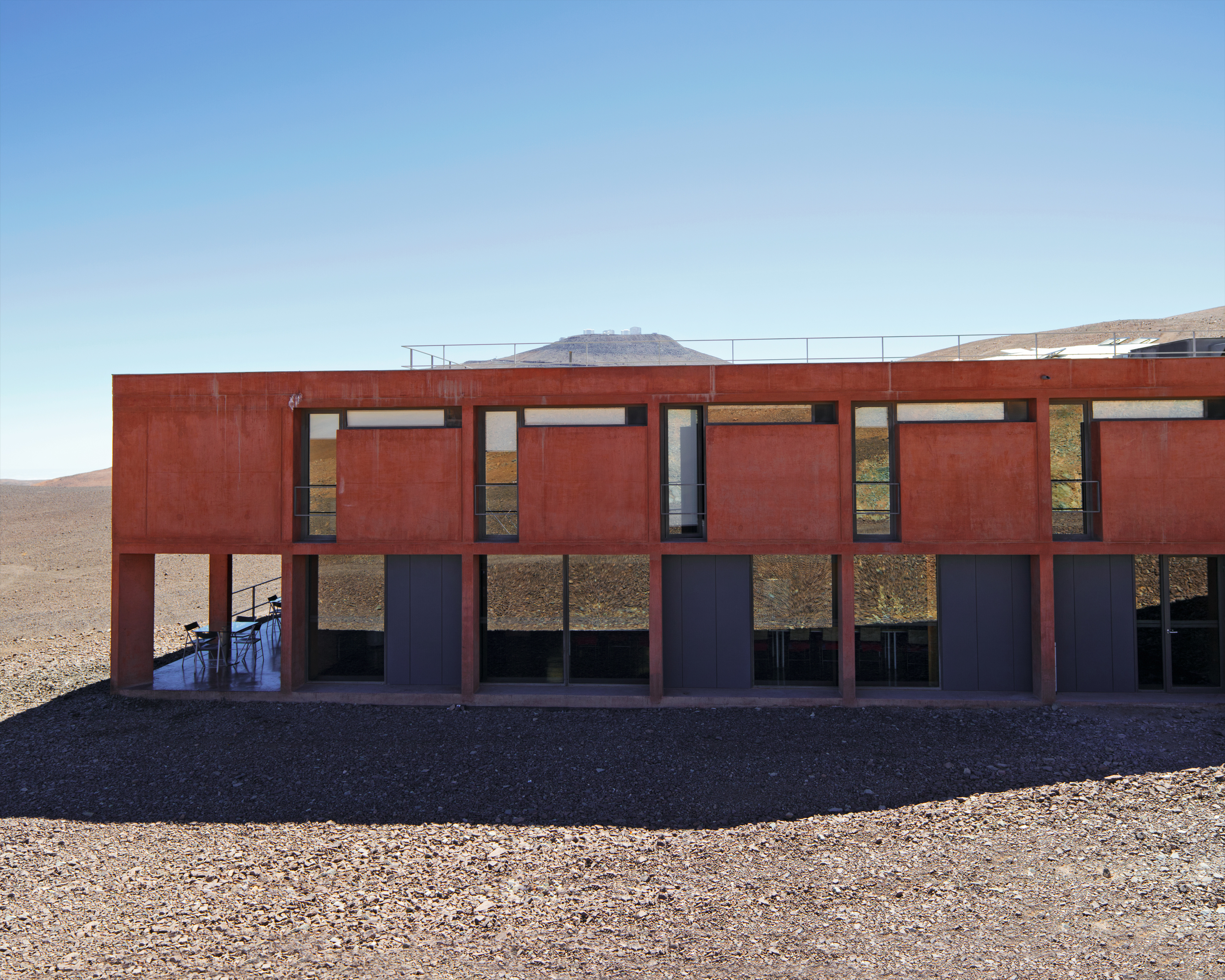
The ESO Hotel in 2012.

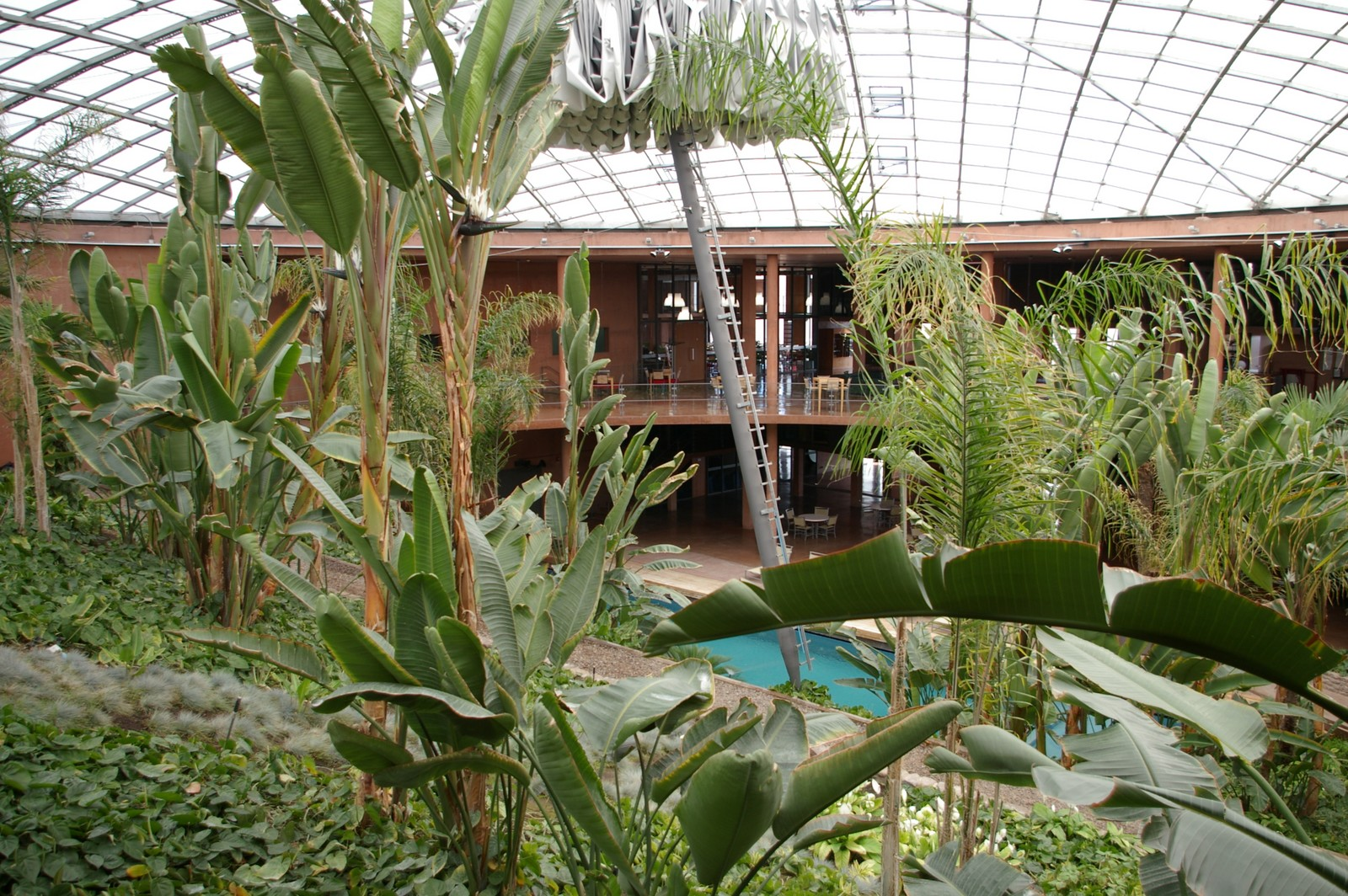
The Garden of the Residencia in ESO Hotel

== In popular culture ==
The hotel's exterior was featured in the 2008 Bond film Quantum of Solace, in which the structure was depicted as the "Perla de Las Dunas" fictional eco-hotel in Bolivia. A miniature of the hotel was built by the visual effects team for the shots in which the hotel is destroyed by a fire in the film.

== See also ==
- Paranal Observatory
- Mars habitat
