= Auer =

Auer may refer to:

== People ==
- Auer (surname)

== Places and rivers ==
Germany

- Auer (Odenwald), a river in the Hessian Odenwald
- Auer Bach, a river of North Rhine-Westphalia, tributary of the Wupper
- Auer Mühlbach, a river in Bavaria, branch of the Isar

Italy

- Auer, South Tyrol, a municipality in South Tyrol

Poland

- German name of Urowo

== Other uses ==
- Auer v. Robbins, a United States Supreme Court case
- Auer rod, cytoplasmic inclusions
- Auer Dult, a traditional annual market in Munich, Germany
- Auer+Weber+Assoziierte, a German architecture firm
- Auergesellschaft, a Berlin-based industrial firm
