= Welsbach Building =

Historic building in Columbus, Ohio, U.S.

- U.S. National Register of Historic Places
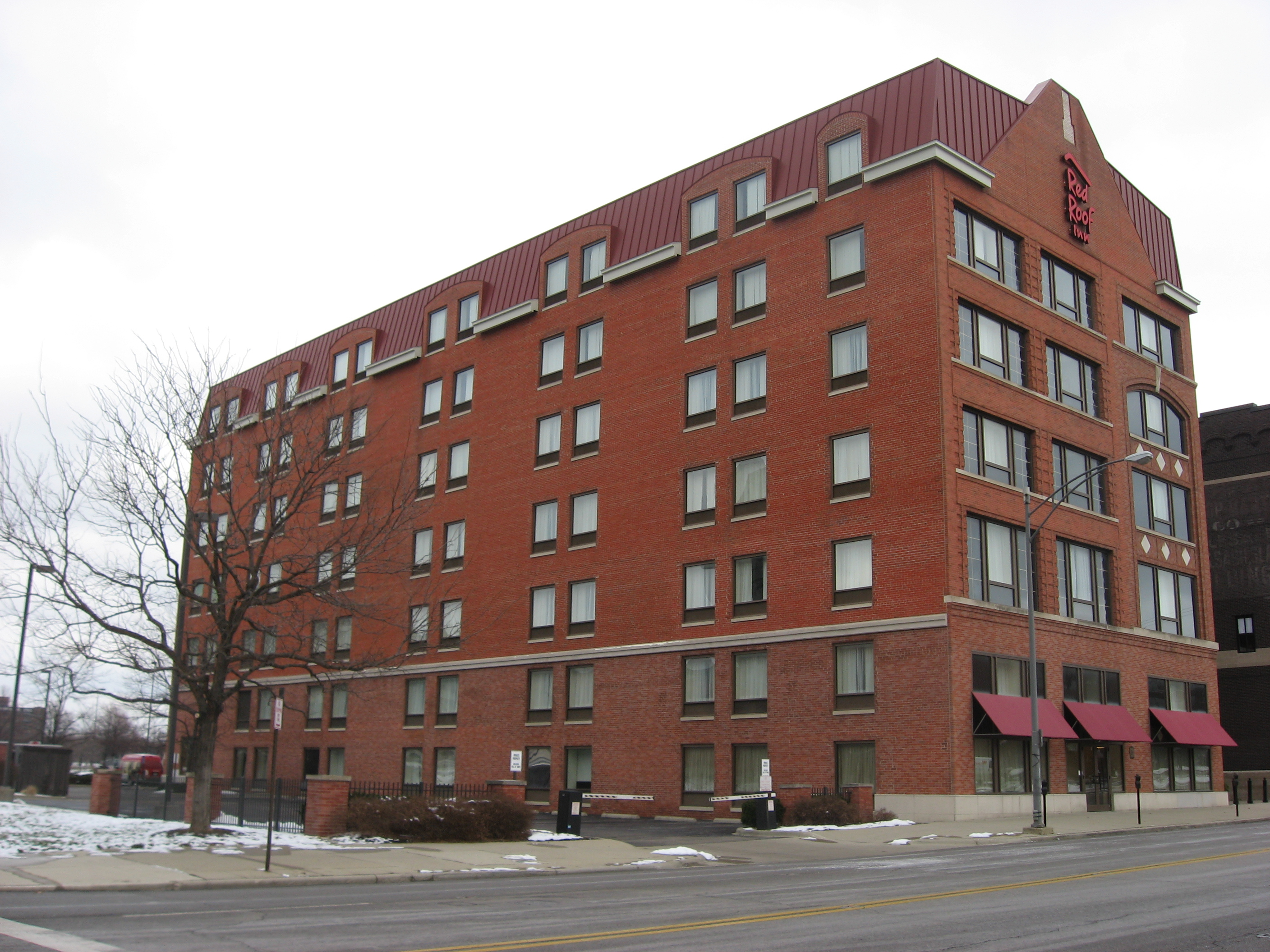
- Exterior in 2010
- Interactive map highlighting the building's location
- Location: 116-118 E. Chestnut St., Columbus, Ohio
- Coordinates: 39.968355°N 82.998403°W
- Built: 1906
- Architect: Jacob S. Goldsmith
- NRHP reference No.: 84000444
- Added to NRHP: November 27, 1984

The Welsbach Building is a historic building in Downtown Columbus, Ohio. It was built in 1906 and listed on the National Register of Historic Places in 1984. The building served as the middle western department of the Welsbach Company, a manufacturer of gas lights, from 1907 to 1929.

The building was extensively renovated around 1997 to become a Red Roof Inn.

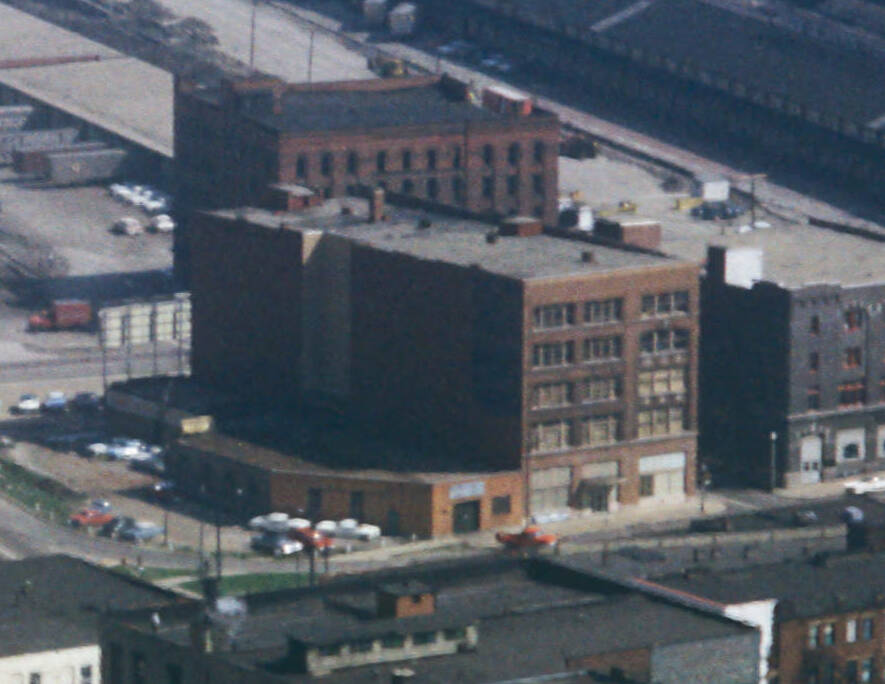
The building in 1965

== See also ==
- National Register of Historic Places listings in Columbus, Ohio
