= Online engineering =

Online engineering (OE; Sometimes also referred to as remote engineering) is a current trend in engineering and science, aiming to allow and organize a shared use of equipment and resources, but also specialized software (such as for example simulators).

Reasons for the growing importance of sharing engineering resources are:

- the growing complexity of engineering tasks,
- more and more specialized and expensive equipment as well as software tools and simulators,
- the necessary use of expensive equipment and software tools/simulators in short-time projects,
- the application of high-tech equipment also in SMEs,
- the need of high qualified staff to control recent equipment,
- the demands of globalization and division of labor,

The International Association of Online Engineering (IAOE) is an international non-profit organization with the objective of encouraging the wider development, distribution and application of online engineering. The main forum of online engineering community is the annual International Conference on Remote Engineering and Virtual Instrumentation (REV).

== See also ==
- Electronics
- Virtual instrumentation
- Virtual education
- Virtual learning environment
