= SolarCity Linz =

Coordinates: 48°15′28″N 14°21′38″E

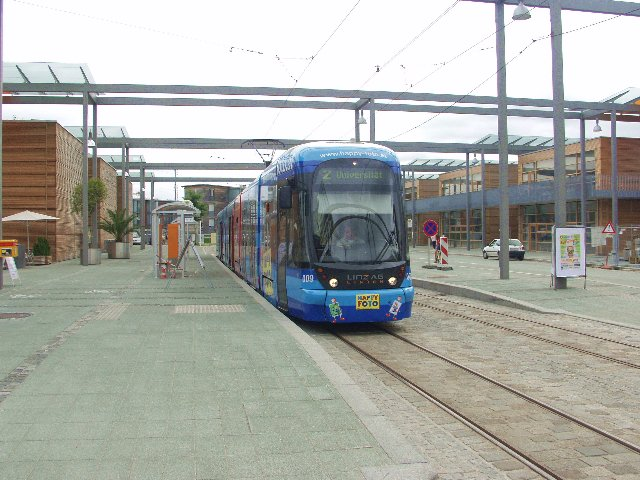
Tram stage in center of solarCity-Linz

The solarCity is an energy-saving living district in Linz-Pichling, Austria, which provides living space for about 4,000 people. The houses were built using a low-energy design. The idea and motivation for providing energy efficient living arrangements stems from the fact that fossil fuels contribute to global warming and that their use should therefore be avoided.
Planning of the project began in 1992. Since 1999, 1,300 apartments were gradually built during a 6-year period. The total cost of the project amounted to 190 million euros. Nearly two-thirds of which was used for the residential building, and only a third of the total cost was due to infrastructure.

== Infrastructure ==
In the centre of the town lie a bank, a supermarket, a tobacconist's and a coffee house. Community issues are being handled by the staff of the district office and the pastoral care/meeting centre. Children are taken care of in the family centre consisting of a kindergarten, a primary school and high school. A nursery will also be built in the future. In the north of solarCity there is also a recreational area. Since September 2005, the solarCity has been connected to the tram network. Using the public transport network it is possible to get to the city centre of Linz in less than 30 minutes.

== Supply and disposal ==
=== Energy supply ===
At least one-third of the hot water used in the solarCity is generated by solar energy. The remaining two-thirds are covered by district heating (A district heating plant can provide higher efficiencies and better pollution control than localized boilers).

=== Sewage water disposal ===
The wastewater will be disposed and treated in the separation system. While grey water is locally managed through a sand bed filter planted and then led to a creek in the neighborhood, the black water is processed conventionally using a gravity sewer of the sewage treatment plant of the city Asten. Part of the wastewater will be separated across special toilets and collected in separate sewers. This nutrient-rich fluid is utilized as fertiliser in agriculture. Larger quantities of rain water have special channels or can be fed into the raceway in north of the solarCity.

== See also ==
Linz
