= Welzbach (Tauber) =

River in Germany

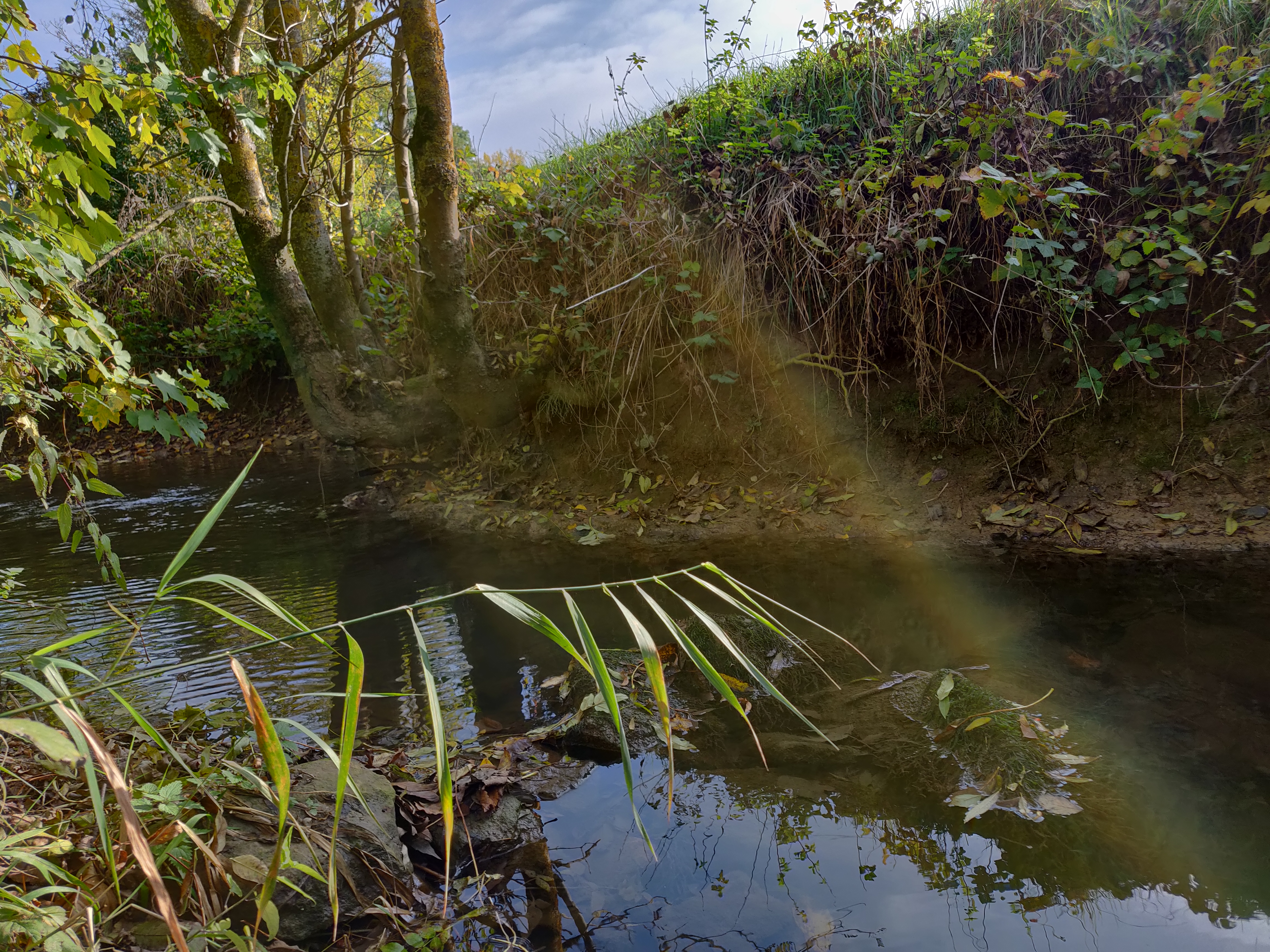
- The right-hand one of the Welzbach's three estuary branches, just before it flows into the Tauber

Location
- Country: Germany
- States: Baden-Württemberg; Bavaria

Physical characteristics
- Mouth: Tauber
  - coordinates: 49°40′28″N 9°37′50″E
- Length: 15.8 km (9.8 mi)

Basin features
- Progression: Tauber→ Main→ Rhine→ North Sea

Welzbach is a river of Baden-Württemberg and of Bavaria, Germany. It is a right tributary of the Tauber in Werbach.

== See also ==
- List of rivers of Baden-Württemberg
- List of rivers of Bavaria
