= Welsbach =

Welsbach is a surname. Notable people with the surname include:

- Alois Auer Ritter von Welsbach(an inventor/polymath)
- Carl Auer von Welsbach(a scientist and inventor)
