= Carinthia University of Applied Sciences =

- Hochschule Kärnten
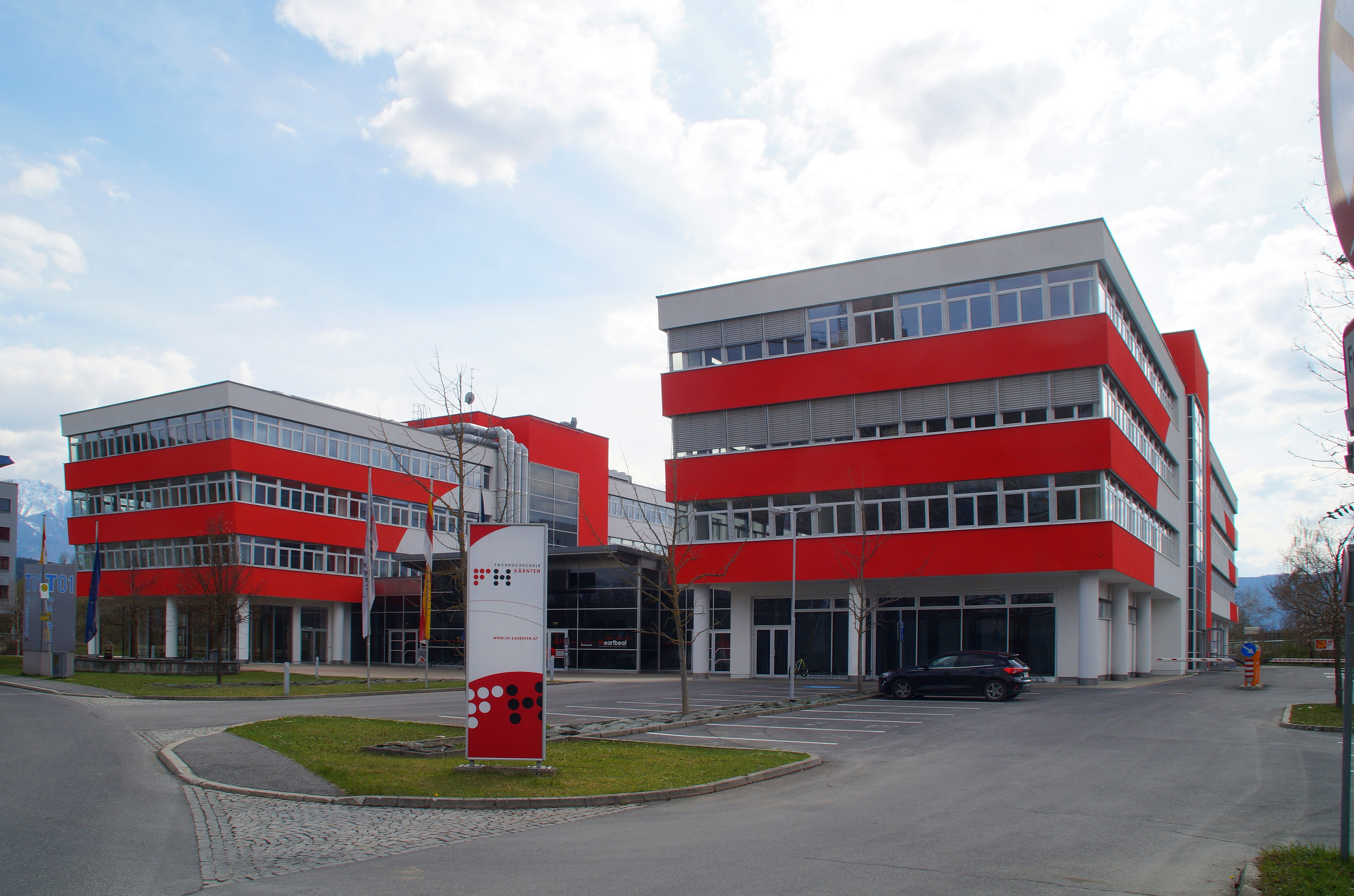
- Hochschule building in Villach
- Type: Hochschule für angewandte Wissenschaften (University of Applied Sciences)
- Established: 1995
- Location: Feldkirchen, Klagenfurt, Spittal/Drau, and Villach, Carinthia, Austria
- Campus: Multi-campus (5 locations)
- Website: www.cuas.at

Carinthia University of Applied Sciences (Fachhochschule Kärnten) is a college of higher education in Carinthia, Austria. The Carinthia University of Applied Sciences was established in 1995 and has five campuses in Carinthia: Feldkirchen, 2 campuses in Klagenfurt, Spittal/Drau and Villach.
