= Fritz Auer =

German architect

- Born: 24 June 1933 (age 93); Tübingen
- Education: University of Stuttgart
- Occupation: Architect
- Practice: Auer+Weber+Assoziierte
- Buildings: Alter Hof, European Southern Observatory Headquarters Extension, Max Planck Institute of Biophysics, Zentraler Omnibusbahnhof München
- Website: auer-weber.de

Fritz Auer (born 24 June 1933 in Tübingen, Germany), is a German architect, the founder and senior partner of Auer+Weber+Assoziierte.

== Career ==
- 1953–1962 studied at TH Stuttgart (University of Stuttgart)
- 1958–1959 Scholarship to Cranbrook Academy of Arts, Bloomfield Hill, Michigan, USA, Master of Architecture
- 1962 graduated from TH Stuttgart
- 1960–1965 Behnisch and Lambart, Stuttgart
- 1965 Yamasaki+Associates, Birmingham, Michigan, USA
- 1966–1979 Partner in Behnisch & Partner, and designed Olympiapark in Munich
- since 1980 Office Auer+Weber with Carlo Weber
- 1985–1992 Professor of the Munich University of Applied Sciences
- 1993–2001 Professor of Staatliche Akademie der Bildenden Künste Stuttgart
- since 1993 Member of Academy of Arts, Berlin

== See also ==
- Auer+Weber+Assoziierte
