= My Mother the Car =

American fantasy sitcom (1965–1966)

- Genre: Fantasy; Sitcom
- Created by: Allan Burns; Chris Hayward
- Starring: Jerry Van Dyke; Maggie Pierce
- Voices of: Ann Sothern
- Theme music composer: Ralph Carmichael; Paul Hampton
- Composer: Ralph Carmichael
- Country of origin: United States
- Original language: English
- No. of seasons: 1
- No. of episodes: 30

Production
- Producer: Rod Amateau
- Editors: Richard K. Brockway; Dann Cahn
- Camera setup: Single-camera
- Running time: 24–25 minutes
- Production companies: Cottage Industries, Inc. United Artists Television

Original release
- Network: NBC
- Release: September 14, 1965 – April 5, 1966

My Mother the Car is an American fantasy sitcom that aired for a single season on NBC between September 14, 1965, and April 5, 1966. Thirty episodes were produced by United Artists Television. The series is about a man whose deceased mother's spirit inhabits an antique car, and which communicates with him through the car radio. Many TV comedies of the 1960s utilized similar premises of extraordinary characters in ordinary situations: a talking horse (Mister Ed), a Martian (My Favorite Martian), a beautiful robot (My Living Doll), a suburbanite witch (Bewitched), an obedient genie (I Dream of Jeannie), or a flying nun (The Flying Nun).

My Mother the Car had an experienced production team with extensive comedy credentials: Rod Amateau (The George Burns and Gracie Allen Show and The Many Loves of Dobie Gillis), Allan Burns (who wrote for Jay Ward and went on to create several critically acclaimed shows, including The Mary Tyler Moore Show, Rhoda, and Lou Grant), James L. Brooks (Room 222, Taxi, and later served as executive producer of The Simpsons) and Chris Hayward (who produced and wrote for Barney Miller during its first several seasons).

Critics and adult viewers panned the show. In 2002, TV Guide proclaimed it to be the second-worst television show of all time, behind The Jerry Springer Show. TV Land's first day of programming in April 1996 included the series premiere as part of a collection of television firsts and rarities, billing it as "the strange but true... infamous series".

== Synopsis ==
The show follows the exploits of attorney David Crabtree (played by Jerry Van Dyke) who, while shopping at a used-car lot for a station wagon to serve as a second family car, instead purchases a dilapidated 1928 Porter touring car. Crabtree hears the car call his name in a woman's voice. The car turns out to be the reincarnation of his deceased mother, Gladys (voiced by Ann Sothern). She talks (only to Crabtree) through the car's radio: the dial light flashes in synchronization with "Mother's" voice. In an effort to get his family to accept the old, tired car, Crabtree brings it to a custom body shop for a full restoration. The car is coveted by a fanatical collector named Captain Manzini (Avery Schreiber), but Crabtree purchases and restores the car before Manzini can acquire it.

For the rest of the series, Crabtree is pursued by the avaricious Captain Manzini, who is determined to acquire the valuable automobile by hook or by crook. In a running gag characterizing his shifty nature, Manzini (who resembles a 1920s silent film villain) always mangles Crabtree's name when speaking to him. "Now, then, Crabapple..." "That's Crabtree." "Whatever."

Others in the cast included Maggie Pierce as wife Barbara, Cindy Eilbacher (sister of Lisa Eilbacher) and Randy Whipple as the kids, Cindy and Randy. Veteran movie and television character actors played supporting roles, including Bill Daily, Harold Peary, Byron Foulger, Bob Jellison, Sam Flint, and Willis Bouchey.

== Production ==
The show was created by Allan Burns and Chris Hayward, who had better success with Rocky & Bullwinkle, The Munsters, and Get Smart (which debuted the same season). Aluminum Model Toys (AMT), a well-known producer of plastic model car kits, introduced a 1/25-scale kit of the Porter in late 1965.

The theme music was composed and conducted by Ralph Carmichael, with lyrics written and sung by Paul Hampton. It was later used on an episode of Arrested Development also called "My Mother, the Car".

The show began with a black-and-white pilot, which was later refilmed in color. The pilot did not originally air, but has been shown several times on Canadian television. Network censors insisted that one particular scene where the car backfired be deleted.

=== Car ===
The on-set car, called a "1928 Porter Stanhope" touring car, was a custom car, rebuilt by Norm Grabowski, from a 1924 Ford Model T, and later restyled by property master Kaye Trapp and Norm Breedlove. A stunt car, driven by a rear-floorboard-hidden driver, was built by George Barris as a replica. The actual Porter Motor Company existed briefly from 1900 to 1901, and made an automobile only in the runabout style, not the stanhope or touring car style.

The on-set car used in My Mother the Car was, in 2016, located in Edmonton, Alberta, Canada and owned by Dave Bodnar. The stunt car was once owned by casino giant William Harrah, who had one of the largest special-interest and antique auto collections of all time in Reno, Nevada. After Harrah's death in 1984, the auction catalogue advertised the car as having a carnation red body with white top and created from parts of a Ford Model T, a Maxwell, a Hudson and a Chevrolet. Harrah's F.R.P. is, since 1994, at the Seal Cove Auto Museum on Mount Desert Island in Maine. As of 2012, the stunt Porter was at the Star Cars Museum in Gatlinburg, Tennessee. On September 3, 2017, the car sold at the Dragone auction, part of the Historic Festival 35 at Lime Rock Park in Lakeville, CT, for $50,000.

== Soundtrack ==
The series was scored by Ralph Carmichael with the lyrics of the title song by Paul Hampton. Sammy Davis Jr. performed a cover version of the song as an opening number on his 1966 musical variety show. The song is also included on two of his albums: The Sammy Davis Jr. Show and That's All!.

== Cast ==
- Jerry Van Dyke as Dave Crabtree
- Maggie Pierce as Barbara Crabtree (née Netwick)
- Ann Sothern as Mother the 1928 Porter (formerly Gladys Crabtree (née Brown))
- Avery Schreiber as Captain Bernard Manzini
- Cindy Eilbacher as Cindy Crabtree
- Randy Whipple as Randy Crabtree
- Paula Winslowe as Mrs. Netwick

== Critical reception ==
A review of the show by John Sinnott on DVD Talk reported that, although "the concept is pretty stupid" and that the show "has gained a reputation for being one of the worst shows to ever air on American TV," it is "actually not that bad," noting that "Jerry Van Dyke does a very good job," "the pretty and perky Maggie Pierce was also very good," and that it "gives some decent laughs." A review of the show on Vulture described it as "the epitome of dated, stupid, campy, embarrassing, lowest common denominator television," that "any blatant attempts at comedy were not successful," and that this "prime example of hackneyed, brainless situation comedy did not have a laugh track for most of their episodes. This helped result in a lot of really tonally confusing work."

== Episodes ==
| No. | Title | Directed by | Written by | Original release date |
|---|---|---|---|---|
| 1 | "Come Honk Your Horn" | Rod Amateau | Allan Burns & Chris Hayward | September 14, 1965 |
While perusing the local car lot, Dave Crabtree discovers that his mother Gladys has been reincarnated as a junky old Porter automobile, so he buys her and brings her home, much to the dismay of both his wife and eccentric car collector Captain Manzini.
| 2 | "The De-Fenders" | Rod Amateau | Allan Burns & Chris Hayward | September 21, 1965 |
When Dave learns that there are local vandals who are stripping cars, he spends a sleepless night going to ridiculous lengths to ensure Mother's safety.
| 3 | "What Makes Auntie Freeze" | Sidney Miller | Earl Barret & Robert C. Dennis | September 28, 1965 |
Dave is forced to drive his mother to a mountaintop wedding, but along the way she gets drunk on antifreeze.
| 4 | "Lassie, I Mean Mother, Come Home" | David Davis | Phil Davis | October 5, 1965 |
Gladys falls asleep and winds up on a truck bound for Mexico. When they discover she's missing, both Dave and Captain Manzini go into mourning.
| 5 | "Burned at the Steak" | David Davis | Arnold Margolin & Jim Parker | October 12, 1965 |
When his mother encourages him to meddle in their quarreling neighbors' affairs, Dave inexplicably winds up breaking up their marriage.
| 6 | "I'm Through Being a Nice Guy" | David Davis | George Kirgo | October 19, 1965 |
Captain Manzini launches Operation Unscrupulous: he replicates the Porter, hires a trio of thieves to steal the original and establishes an airtight alibi for himself.
| 7 | "Lights, Camera, Mother" | Sidney Miller | Frank Fox | October 26, 1965 |
An obnoxious neighbor petitions Dave to get rid of his "eyesore" car, but he changes his tune when a television executive announces plans to feature the Porter in a TV commercial.
| 8 | "The Captain Manzini Grand Prix" | Tom Montgomery | Allan Burns & Chris Hayward | November 2, 1965 |
Captain Manzini goads Dave into a race against a speed walker in an attempt to attain ownership of the Porter.
| 9 | "TV or Not TV" | James Sheldon | Allan Burns & Chris Hayward | November 9, 1965 |
Dave puts a TV in the garage for Mother, but confusion abounds when she wins a chance to appear on a game show.
| 10 | "My Son, the Ventriloquist" | Sidney Miller | Phil Davis | November 16, 1965 |
With the help of his mother, Dave lands a new client by pretending to be a ventriloquist.
| 11 | "My Son, the Judge" | Sidney Miller | Phil Davis & Lila Garrett & Bernie Kahn | November 23, 1965 |
Dave is up for a job as a judge, but complications ensue when he gets a pair of roller skates stuck on his feet.
| 12 | "And Leave the Drive-In to Us" | David Davis | Lou Breslow & Alan Woods | November 30, 1965 |
For his mother's birthday, Dave decides to take the family to the drive-in, but the evening is mostly a disaster.
| 13 | "For Whom the Horn Honks" | Rod Amateau | George Kirgo | December 7, 1965 |
In order to get his mitts on the Porter, Captain Manzini fakes a terminal illness.
| 14 | "Hey Lady, Your Slip Isn't Showing" | Tom Montgomery | Tom Koch | December 14, 1965 |
When Captain Manzini manipulates Barbara's mother, it results in the whole family treasure hunting for the Porter's registration slip.
| 15 | "Many Happy No-Returns" | Tom Montgomery | Phil Davis | December 21, 1965 |
Dave and Barb each decide to forfeit their own Christmas presents to bid on the other's work in a charity art auction.
| 16 | "Shine On, Shine On, Honeymoon" | Rod Amateau | Allan Burns & Chris Hayward | December 28, 1965 |
Dave and Barb decide to finally go on their honeymoon, but Barb's mother goes to ridiculous lengths to ensure they don't leave.
| 17 | "I Remember Mama, Why Can't You Remember Me?" | Rod Amateau | Arnold Margolin & Jim Parker | January 4, 1966 |
Dave's mother gets amnesia following a fender bender.
| 18 | "Goldporter" | David Davis | Phil Davis | January 11, 1966 |
Captain Manzini uses a hypnotic drug on Dave to get him to agree to sell the Porter.
| 19 | "The Incredible Shrinking Car" | Rod Amateau | Allan Burns & Chris Hayward | January 18, 1966 |
Captain Manzini uses a molecular compressor on the Porter to render it useless to Dave.
| 20 | "I'd Rather Do It Myself, Mother" | David Davis | Phil Davis | January 25, 1966 |
Dave hires a maid to help out with the housework, but she quickly takes charge of the house.
| 21 | "You Can't Get There from Here" | Tom Montgomery | Arnold Margolin & Jim Parker | February 1, 1966 |
The Crabtrees, taking the children to summer camp, get stranded in the backwoods after a busybody local sheriff discovers Dave's driver's license has expired and refuses to let the family continue on.
| 22 | "A Riddler on the Roof" | Rod Amateau | Phil Davis | February 8, 1966 |
Dave and his mother try to thwart the assassination of a visiting dignitary.
| 23 | "My Son, the Criminal" | Rod Amateau | Phil Davis | February 15, 1966 |
A nosy mailman convinces officials that Dave killed his mother and buried her under the floor of the garage.
| 24 | "An Unreasonable Facsimile" | David Davis | Arnold Margolin & Jim Parker | February 22, 1966 |
Captain Manzini tries to steal the Porter away from the Crabtrees by hiring a Dave lookalike.
| 25 | "Over the Hill to the Junkyard" | Rod Amateau | Phil Davis | March 1, 1966 |
Numerous complications ensue when Barbara wins a new car.
| 26 | "It Might as Well Be Spring as Not" | Rod Amateau | James L. Brooks | March 8, 1966 |
Dave's wealthy new client loves the Porter, and offers his limo and chauffeur in exchange for it; Gladys, who's smitten with the client, wants her son to make the deal.
| 27 | "Absorba the Greek" | David Davis | Phil Davis | March 15, 1966 |
A prudish building owner hires Dave to close down a nightclub he claims is indecent. Dave and Barbara go to check out the place and end up masquerading as exotic Greek dancers.
| 28 | "The Blabbermouth" | Rod Amateau | James L. Brooks & Mitch Persons | March 22, 1966 |
Barbara learns the truth when she walks into the garage and catches Dave and Mother talking. In no time, the secret's out and the press descends on the Crabtrees. This only makes Manzini want the car more, so he plays on Mother's vanity by convincing her he will make her a star.
| 29 | "When You Wish Upon a Car" | Rod Amateau | John Barbour & Gordon Mitchell | March 29, 1966 |
Mother leads Cindy and Randy to believe that she's a genie who makes wishes come true when they rub her with a magic cloth. The Crabtree kids are soon charging other youngsters to rub and make a wish. Mother is basking in the attention, but Dave wants it to stop immediately.
| 30 | "Desperate Minutes" | David Davis | Phil Davis | April 5, 1966 |
A gun-toting hooligan and his moll are hiding out at the Crabtree house after robbing a jewelry store. Dave botches several attempts to escape, leaving it up to Mother to save the day when the criminals try to escape in her.

== Release ==
In the United Kingdom, the series debuted on ITV on 8 November 1965.

== Ownership status ==
The show's owner is Metro-Goldwyn-Mayer (now part of Amazon MGM Studios), which bought United Artists in 1981.

== Home media ==
TGG Direct released a DVD box set of the series on 12 November 2013. It contains the 30 episodes that aired, but not the unaired pilot. The laugh track was removed for the DVD set.

All 30 episodes were available on Hulu. The show is also available on MGM's YouTube channel.

== Syndication ==
Antenna TV began airing episodes of the show on September 19, 2015.
