= Robert Twyford =

Robert Twyford may refer to:

- Robert Twyford (MP), Member of Parliament for Derbyshire, 1378
- A watchman in Birmingham, England who was the subject of the 1814 Death of Robert Twyford
- Robert E. Twyford (died 1942) who founded the Twyford Motor Car Company
