= Breedlove =

Breedlove is an English occupational surname likely derived from Old English "bridel" (pronounced "breedel"), meaning to catch or curb, and Anglo-Norman "louve" or wolf. Etymologically related surnames include Catchlove, Pretlove, and Truslove. An alternate derivation is a combination of Middle English "brede" (breed or produce) and "loue" (love).

Notable people bearing it include:

- Beau Breedlove, Oregon legislative intern involved with Portland mayor Sam Adams
- Ben Breedlove (1993–2011), American video blogger
- Breedlove quadruplets, first set of identical, natural quadruplets born in Houston (2005)
- Charles Winchester Breedlove (1898–1934), American actor, director, and politician
- Craig Breedlove (1937–2023), American engineer and driver
- Dennis Eugene Breedlove (1939–2012), American botanist, ethnobotanist, and plant collector
- Gina Breedlove, American singer, songwriter, and actress
- Hugh Breedlove Millen (born 1963), American professional football player
- James M. Breedlove (1922–2016), U.S. Air Force Major General
- Joseph Penn Breedlove (1874–1955), American librarian and author
- Lynn Breedlove (born 1956), American musician
- Marc Breedlove (born 1954), American neuroscientist
- Philip M. Breedlove (born 1955), U.S. Air Force four-star general
- Rod Breedlove (1938–2021), American professional football player
- Sarah Breedlove (1867–1919), African-American entrepreneur, philanthropist, and activist; also known as Madame C.J. Walker
- Seth Breedlove (born 1981/1982), American filmmaker
- Steve Breedlove (born 1950), American Anglican bishop

== See also ==
=== Places ===
- Breedlove, former name of Silver Lake, West Virginia
- Breedlove House and Water Tower, historic property in Bentonville, Arkansas
- Breedlove Island, located in Big Skin Bayou, near Lee's Chapel, Arkansas
- Breedlove Knob, located in the Virginia Blue Ridge Mountains
- Breedlove Mill, located on the Joseph P. Hunt Farm in Granville County, North Carolina
- Breedlove House, historic home located in Trinity Historic District, Durham, North Carolina
- Mims-Breedlove-Priest-Weatherton House, historic home in Little Rock, Arkansas
- Simpson-Breedlove House, historic home in Union Township, Indiana

=== Other ===
- Breedlove Guitars, American acoustic instrument company co-founded by luthier Larry Breedlove
- The Dreams of Sarah Breedlove, 2005 play by Regina Taylor
- Melungeon DNA Project, 2005 genetic study of Breedlove and other selected surnames in Hancock County, Tennessee
- Breedlove Odyssey, 2005 concert tour featuring Mos Def, Talib Kweli, Pharoahe Monch, K'naan, and others
- Breedlove v. Nicolet, 1833 U.S. Supreme Court case
- Parsons v. Breedlove, 1830 U.S. Supreme Court case
- Breedlove v. Suttles, 1937 U.S. Supreme Court case
- Lophospermum breedlovei, Mexican perennial plant named for botanist Dennis E. Breedlove
- Breedlove AMX, limited-edition model sold by American Motors Corporation in 1968–1969; the 1969 AMC Javelin also included a "Craig Breedlove roof-mounted spoiler" option
