= Stanhope (car) =

Auto body style common 1900–1910

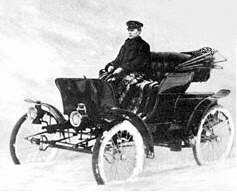
1899 Winton Stanhope

In automotive use, a Stanhope is a car body style characterized by its single bench seat mounted at the center, folding cloth top, and a dashboard at the front. These vehicles were built from approximately 1900 to 1910. The design was derived from the Stanhope horse-drawn carriage and could be considered a specific type of runabout.

Initial stanhope designs featured tiller steering, either in the center or at the side. Features of the car included a foot button to signal a bell (early version of a horn), hard rubber tires, wood trim, and eight forward and three reverse gears, and a top speed of about 50 mph (80 km/h).

== Models ==
- 1899–1916 Woods electric car
- 1899 Winton (largest manufacturer of gasoline-powered automobiles in the United States at the time)
- 1900–1901 Porter Motor Company (manufacturer of steam-powered automobiles)
- 1900–1910 White Steamcar (largest manufacturer of steam-powered automobiles)
- 1901–1907 Oldsmobile Curved Dash
- 1904–1906 Twyford Stanhope
