= Winton Motor Carriage Company =

United States automobile manufacturer

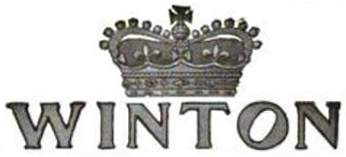
- Type: Automobile Manufacturing
- Industry: Automotive
- Genre: Touring cars, limousines
- Founded: 1897
- Founder: Alexander Winton
- Defunct: 1962
- Headquarters: Cleveland, Ohio, United States; 41°28′34″N 81°45′41″W
- Area served: United States
- Products: Vehicles; Automotive parts

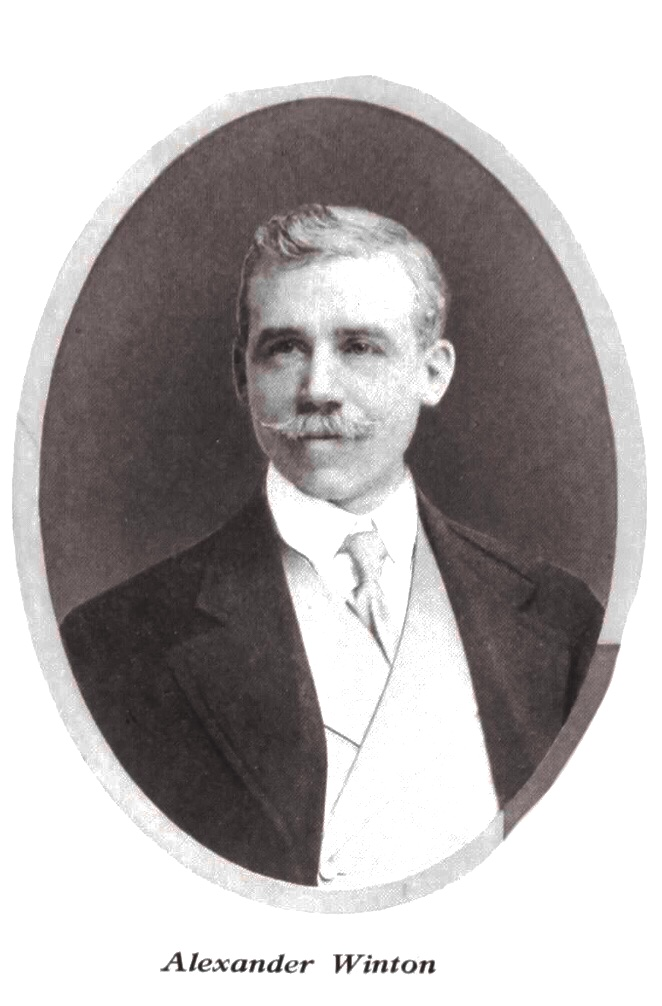
Alexander Winton

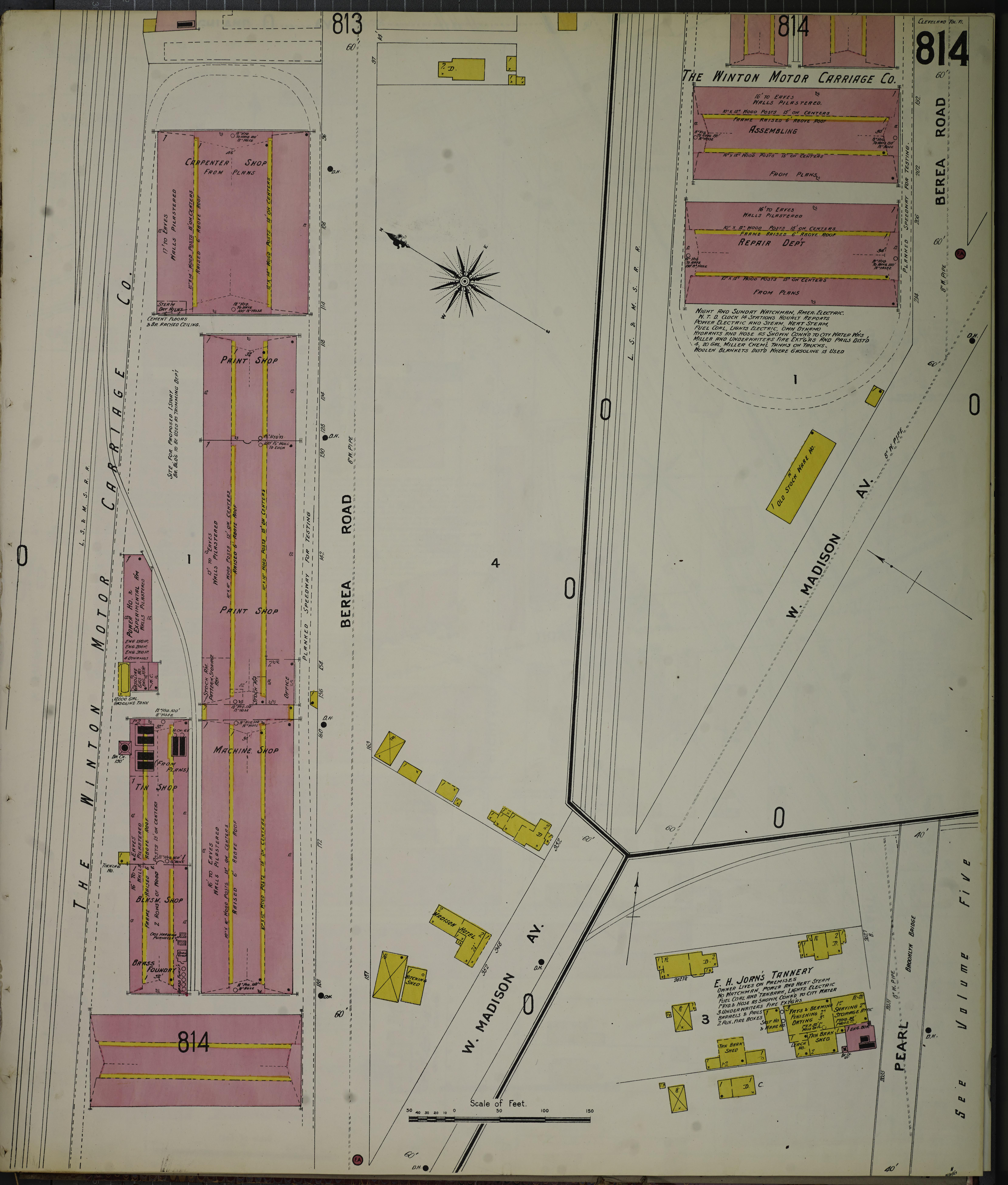
Winton plant (1903)

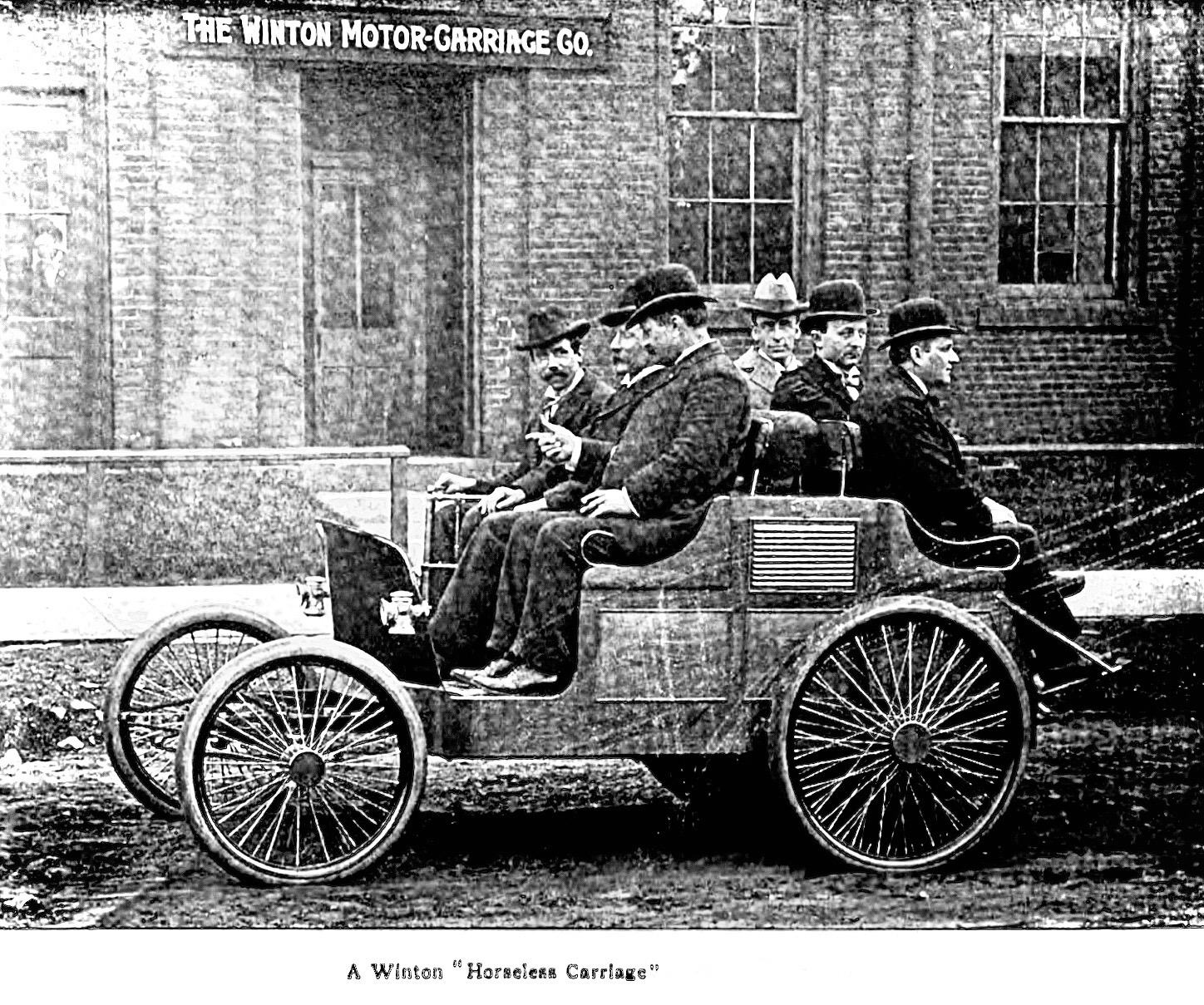
Winton Motor Carriage (1896).

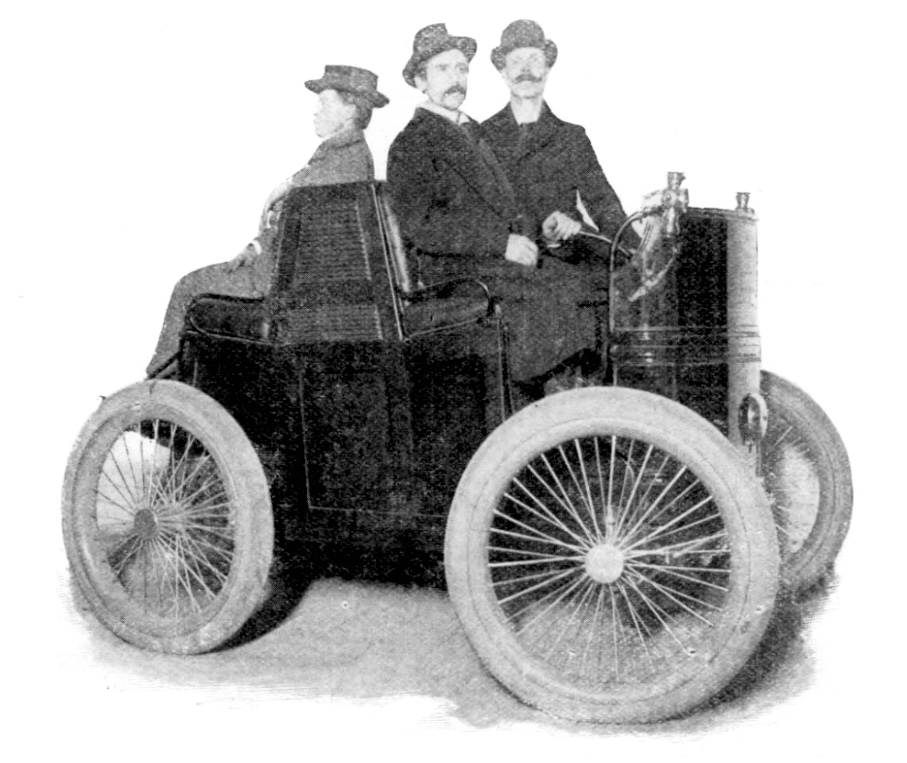
Winton (1897)

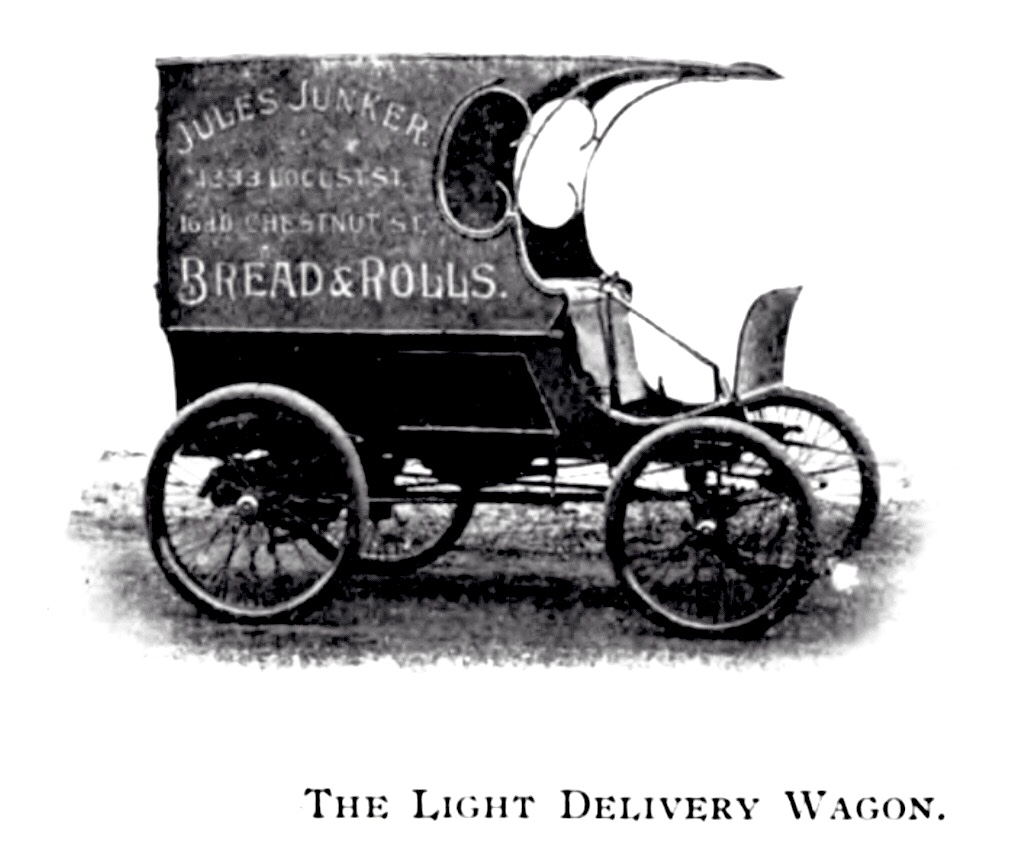
Winton light delivery wagon (1900).

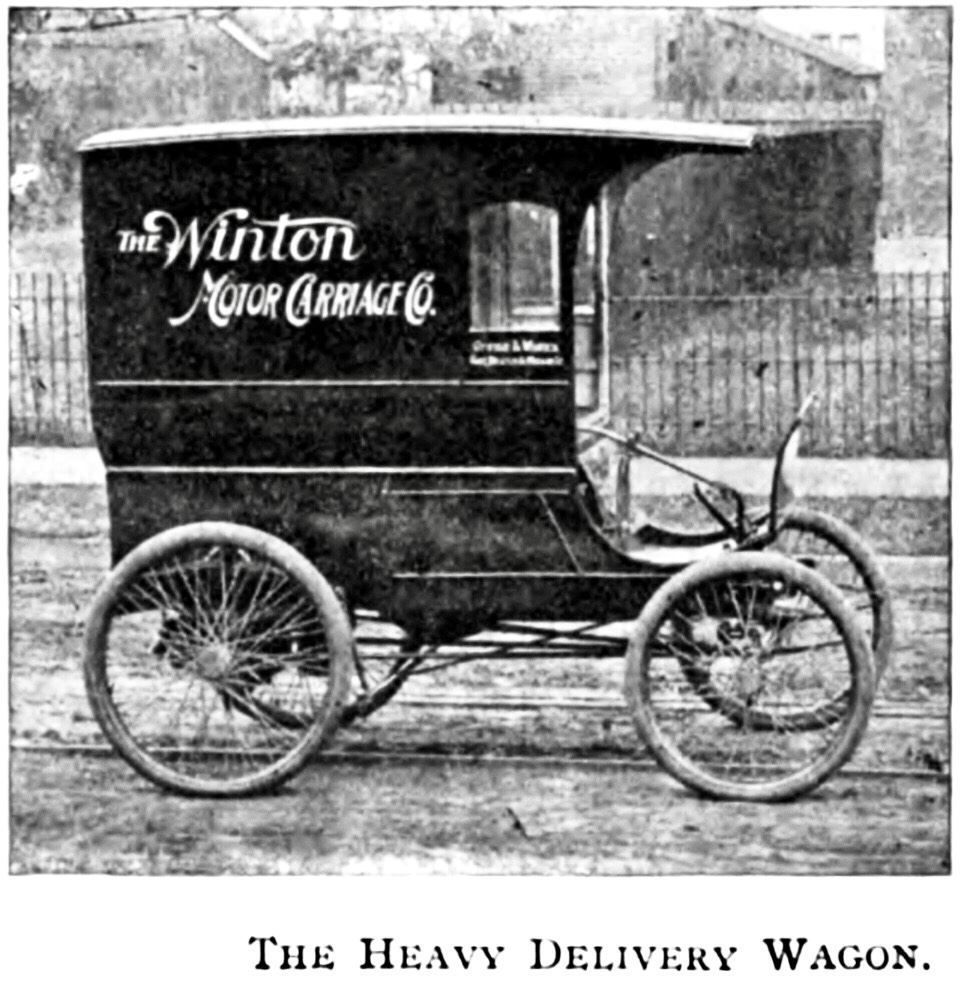
Winton heavy delivery wagon (1900).

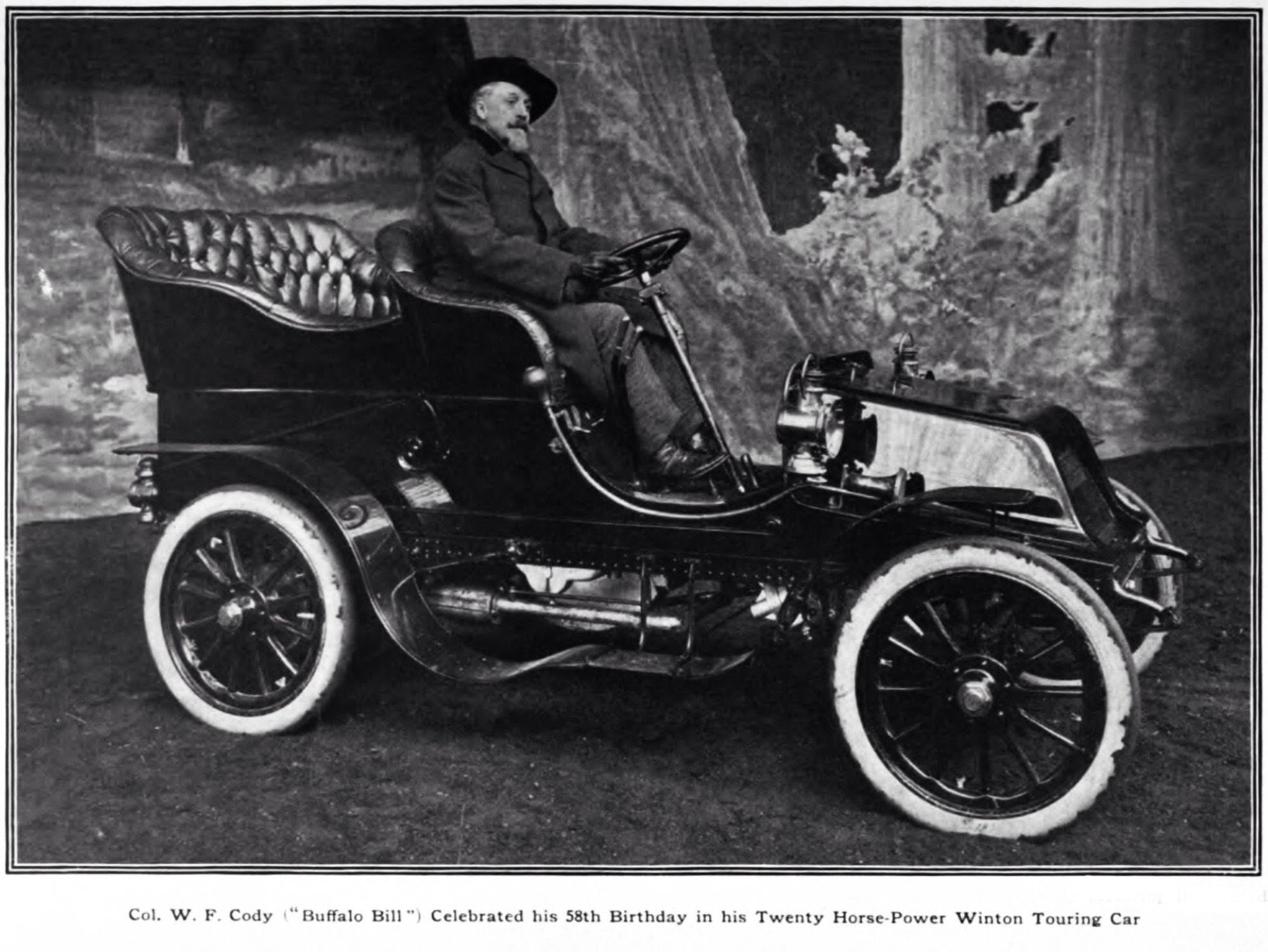
Buffalo Bill Cody celebrates his 58th birthday (Feb. 26, 1904) in a Winton 20HP.

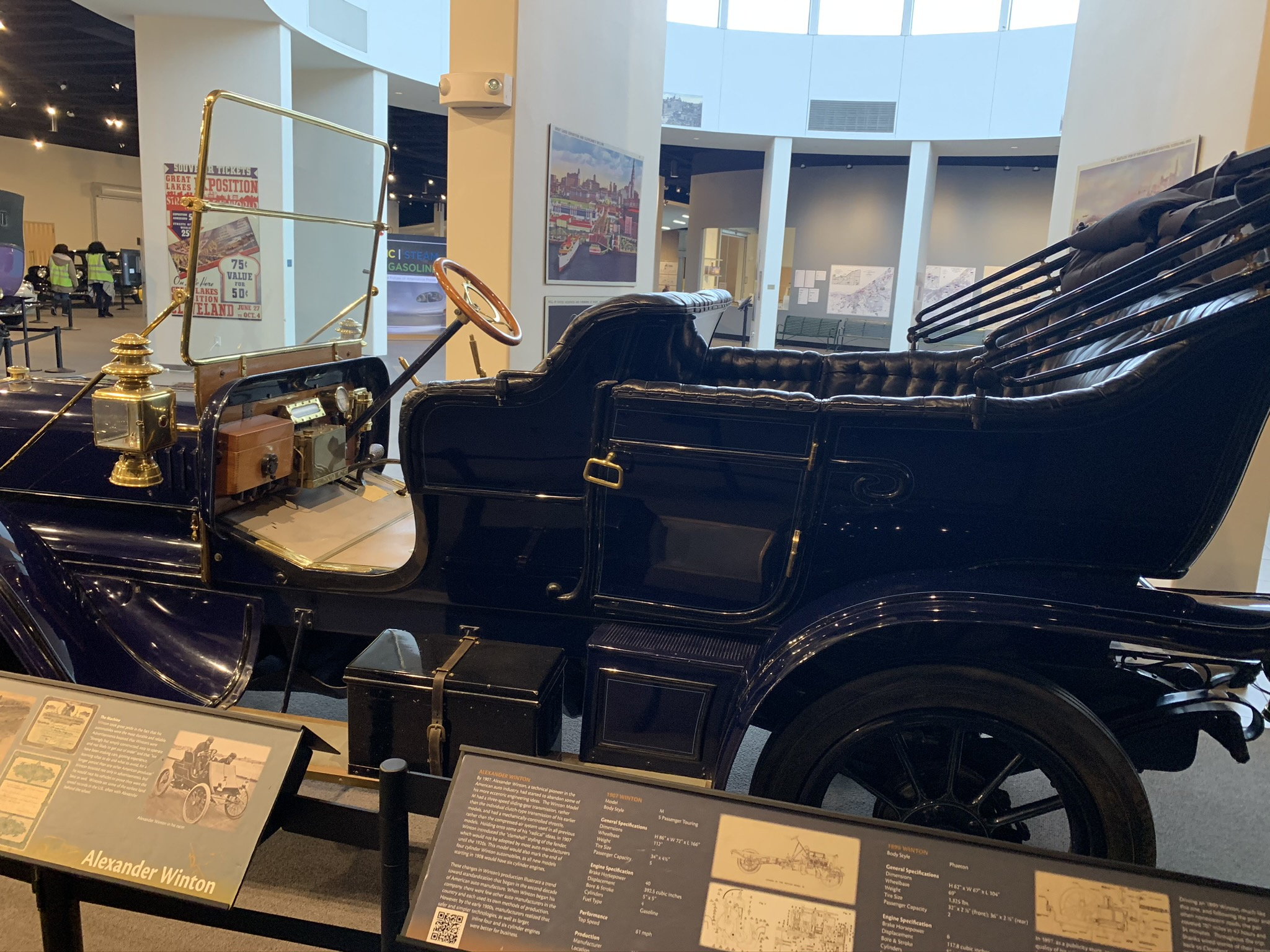
1907 Winton at Crawford Auto-Aviation Museum

The Winton Motor Carriage Company was a pioneer United States automobile manufacturer based in Cleveland, Ohio. Winton was one of the first American companies to sell a motor car. In 1912, Winton became one of the first American manufacturers of diesel engines.

== History ==
=== 1896–1903 ===
In 1896, Scottish immigrant Alexander Winton, owner of the Winton Bicycle Company, turned from bicycle production to an experimental single-cylinder automobile before starting his car company. (Note: Winton owned a large lakeshore estate in Lakewood, Ohio. In the mid-1960s, the home was demolished, and an upscale high-rise condominium was constructed aptly named Winton Place.)

The company was incorporated on March 15, 1897. Its first automobiles were built by hand. Each vehicle had painted sides, padded seats, a leather roof, and gas lamps. B.F. Goodrich made the tires.

By this time, Winton had already produced two fully operational prototype automobiles. In May of that year, the 10 hp (7.5 kW) model achieved the astonishing speed of 33.64 mph (54.14 km/h) on a test around a Cleveland horse track. However, the new invention was still subject to much skepticism, so to prove his automobile's durability and usefulness, Alexander Winton had his car undergo an 800 mi (1,300 km) endurance run from Cleveland to New York City.

On March 24, 1898, Robert Allison of Port Carbon, Pennsylvania, became the first person to buy a Winton automobile after seeing the first automobile advertisement in Scientific American. Later that year the Winton Motor Carriage Company sold 21 more vehicles, including one to James Ward Packard, who later founded the Packard automobile company after Winton challenged a very dissatisfied Packard to do better. This is the same mistake that Enzo Ferrari would later make with Ferruccio Lamborghini.

Winton sold his first manufactured semi-truck in 1899. More than one hundred Winton vehicles were sold that year, making the company the largest manufacturer of gasoline-powered automobiles in the United States. This success led to the opening of the first automobile dealership by Mr. H. W. Koler in Reading, Pennsylvania. To deliver the vehicles, in 1899, Winton built the first automobile hauler in America. One of these 1899 Wintons was purchased by Larz Anderson and his new wife, Isabel Weld Perkins. (Note: The vehicle is displayed at Larz Anderson Auto Museum in Brookline, Massachusetts.)

Publicity generated sales. In 1901, the news that both Reginald Vanderbilt and Alfred Vanderbilt had purchased Winton automobiles boosted the company's image substantially. Models at the time were a two-passenger Runabout with a one-cylinder engine (8 hp) and a four-passenger Touring and Mail Delivery Van, also with a one-cylinder engine (9 hp). That year, Winton lost a race at Grosse Pointe to Henry Ford. Winton vowed a comeback and win. He produced the 1902 Winton Bullet, which set an unofficial land speed record of 70 mph (110 km/h) in Cleveland that year. The Bullet was defeated by another Ford by famed driver Barney Oldfield, but two more Bullet race cars were built.

In 1903, Dr. Horatio Nelson Jackson made the first successful automobile drive across the United States. On a $50 bet (equal to $1,792 today), he purchased a slightly used two-cylinder, 20 hp (15 kW) Winton touring car and hired a mechanic, Sewall K. Crocker (April 7, 1883 – April 22, 1913), to accompany him. Starting in San Francisco, California, ending in Manhattan, New York City, New York. The trip lasted 63 days, 12 hours, and 30 minutes, including breakdowns and delays while waiting for parts to arrive (especially in Cleveland.) The two men often drove miles out of the way to find a passable road, repeatedly hoisted the Winton up and over rocky terrain and mud holes with a block and tackle, or were pulled out of soft sand by horse teams. In 1903, there were only 150 miles of paved road in the entire country, all inside city limits. There were no road signs or maps. They once paid the exorbitant price of $5 for five gallons of gasoline (equal to $179 today). Jackson and Crocker followed rivers and streams, transcontinental railroad tracks, sheep trails, and dirt back roads. (Note: Jackson's Winton is part of the collections at the National Museum of American History.) The car is now part of the permanent collection of the Smithsonian Institution's National Museum of American History after Jackson himself donated the vehicle to the museum where it can still be seen on display.

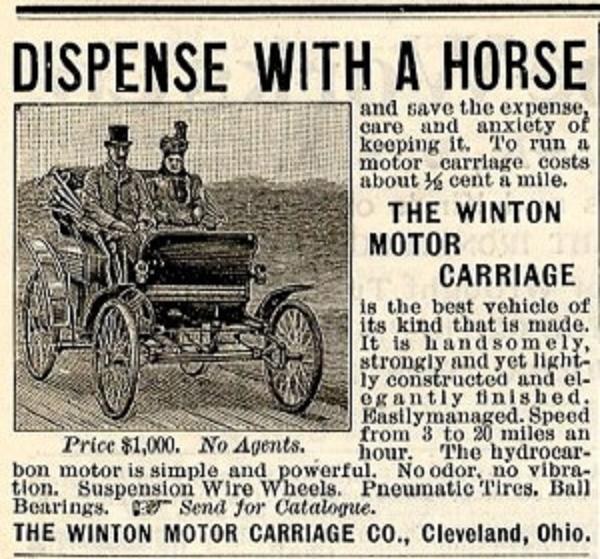
1898 Winton Motor Carriage Company's first automobile ad

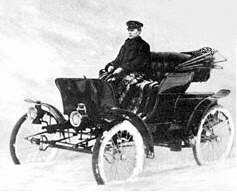
1899 Winton Stanhope

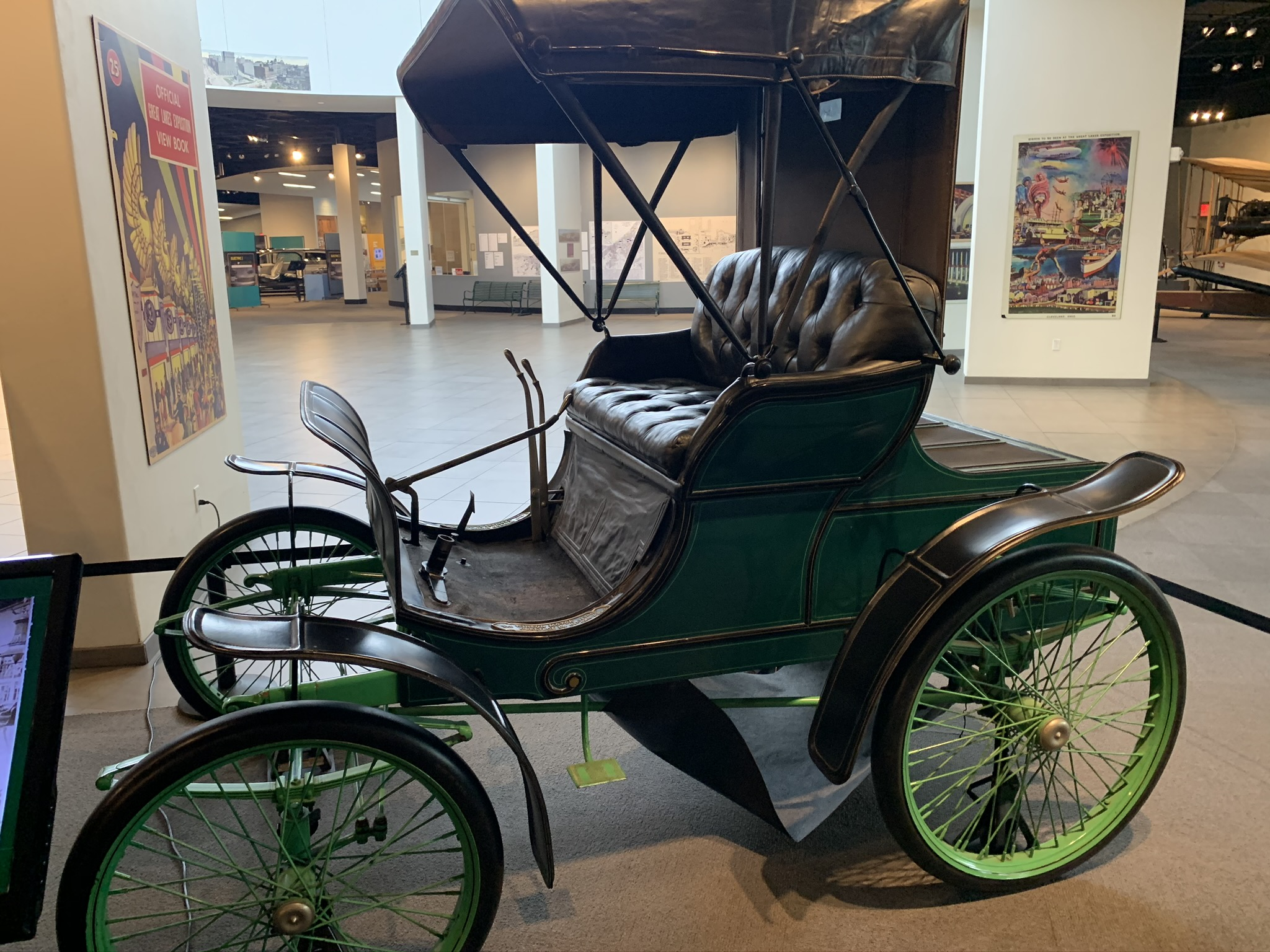
1899 Winton at Crawford Auto-Aviation Museum

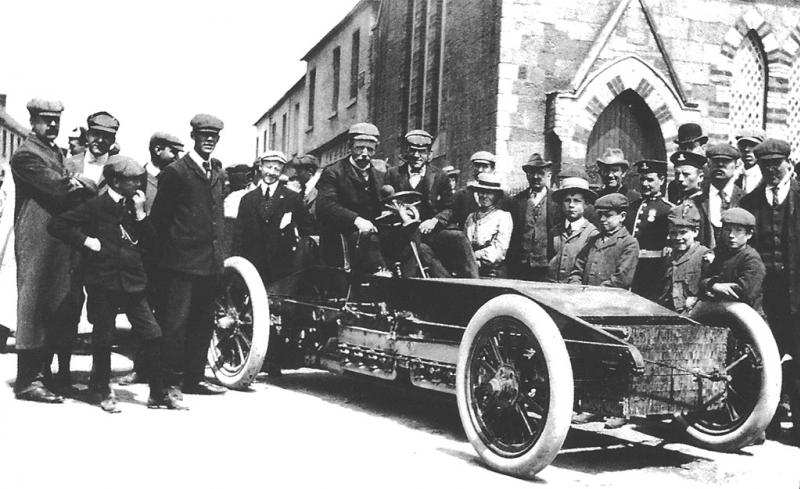
1903 Gordon Bennett Trophy, Athy, Ireland; Alexander Winton in the Winton Bullet 2

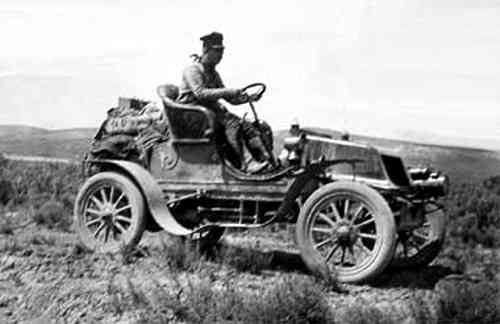
1903 Horatio Nelson Jackson in his two-seat Winton tourer, "The Vermont", drives across America

=== 1904–1924 ===
The 1904 Winton was a five-passenger tonneau-equipped tourer which sold for US$2,500. By contrast, the Enger 40 was US$2,000, the FAL US$1,750, an Oakland 40 US$1,600, the Cole 30 and Colt Runabout US$1,500, while the (1913) Lozier Light Six Metropolitan started at US$3,250, American's lowest-priced model was US$4,250, and Lozier's Big Six were US$5,000 and up. In 1905 a 5t truck war developed.

Models (1904)

Type	Engine	HP	Wheelbase	Transmission
Touring-5p.	Two-cylinder	20	94.5"	2-speed sliding-gear
Touring-5p.	Four-cylinder	24	104"	2-speed sliding-gear

Winton's flat-mounted water-cooled straight-twin engine, situated amidships of the car, produced 20 hp (15 kW). The channel and angle steel-framed car weighed 2,300 lb (1,000 kg).

Models (1914)

Model	Engine	HP	Wheelbase
Model 20	Six-cylinder	48.6	130"

Winton continued to successfully market automobiles to upscale consumers through the 1910s, but sales began to fall in the early 1920s. This was due to the very conservative nature of the company, both in terms of technical development and styling. Only one sporting model was offered — the Sport Touring, with the majority of Wintons featuring tourer, sedan, limousine and town car styling. The Winton Motor Carriage Company ceased automobile production on February 11, 1924.

Models (1922)

Model	Engine	HP	Wheelbase
Model 40	Six-cylinder	70/72	132"

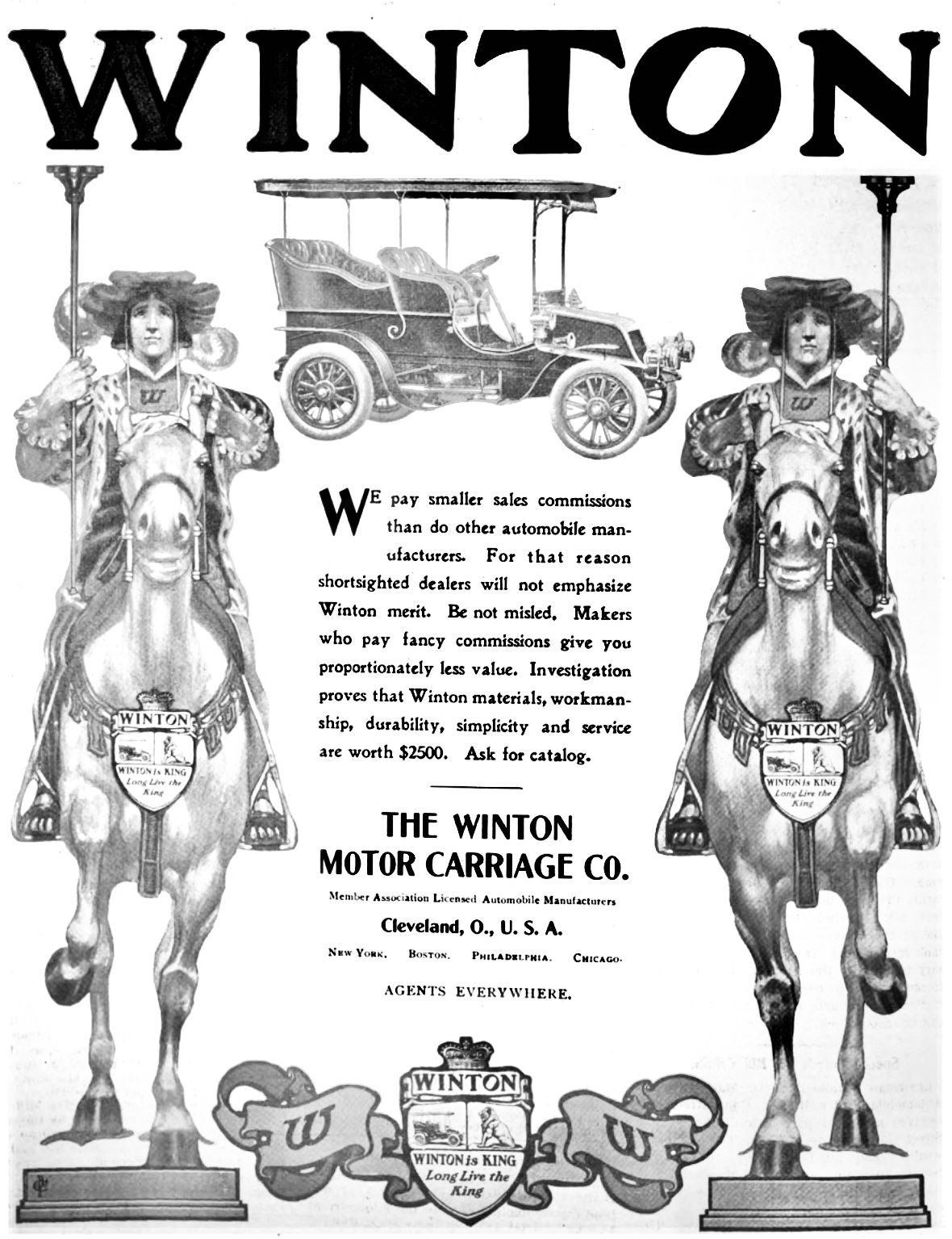
Winton Motor Company advertisement, 1904

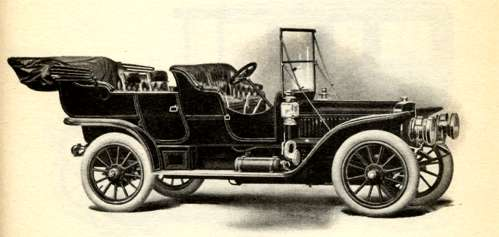
1908 Winton touring car

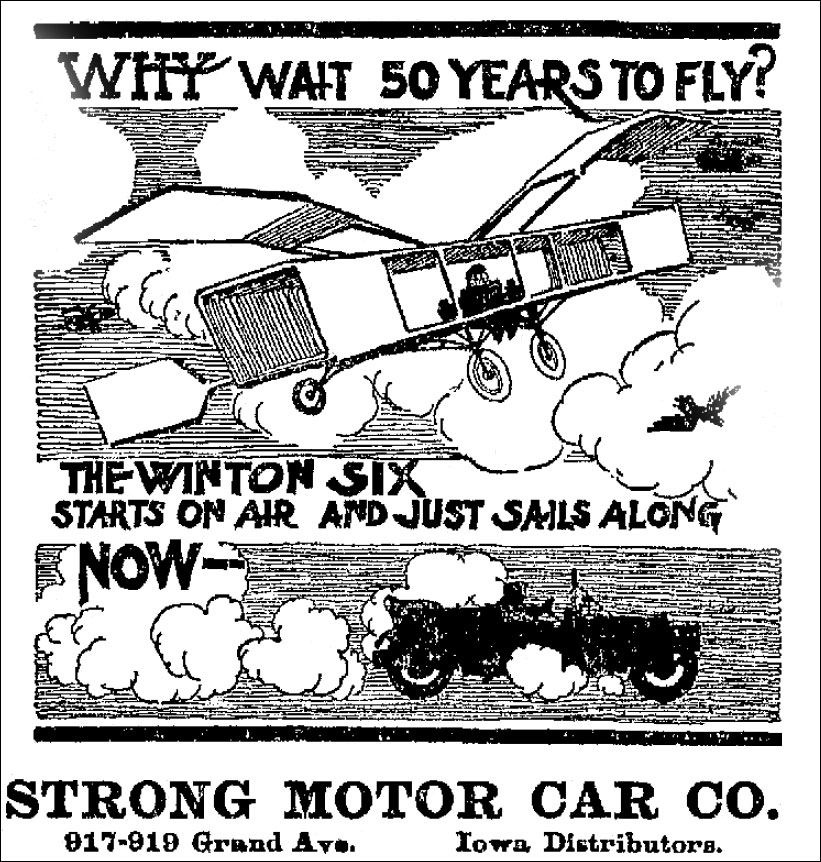
Winton advertisement in Des Moines Capital, May 14, 1910

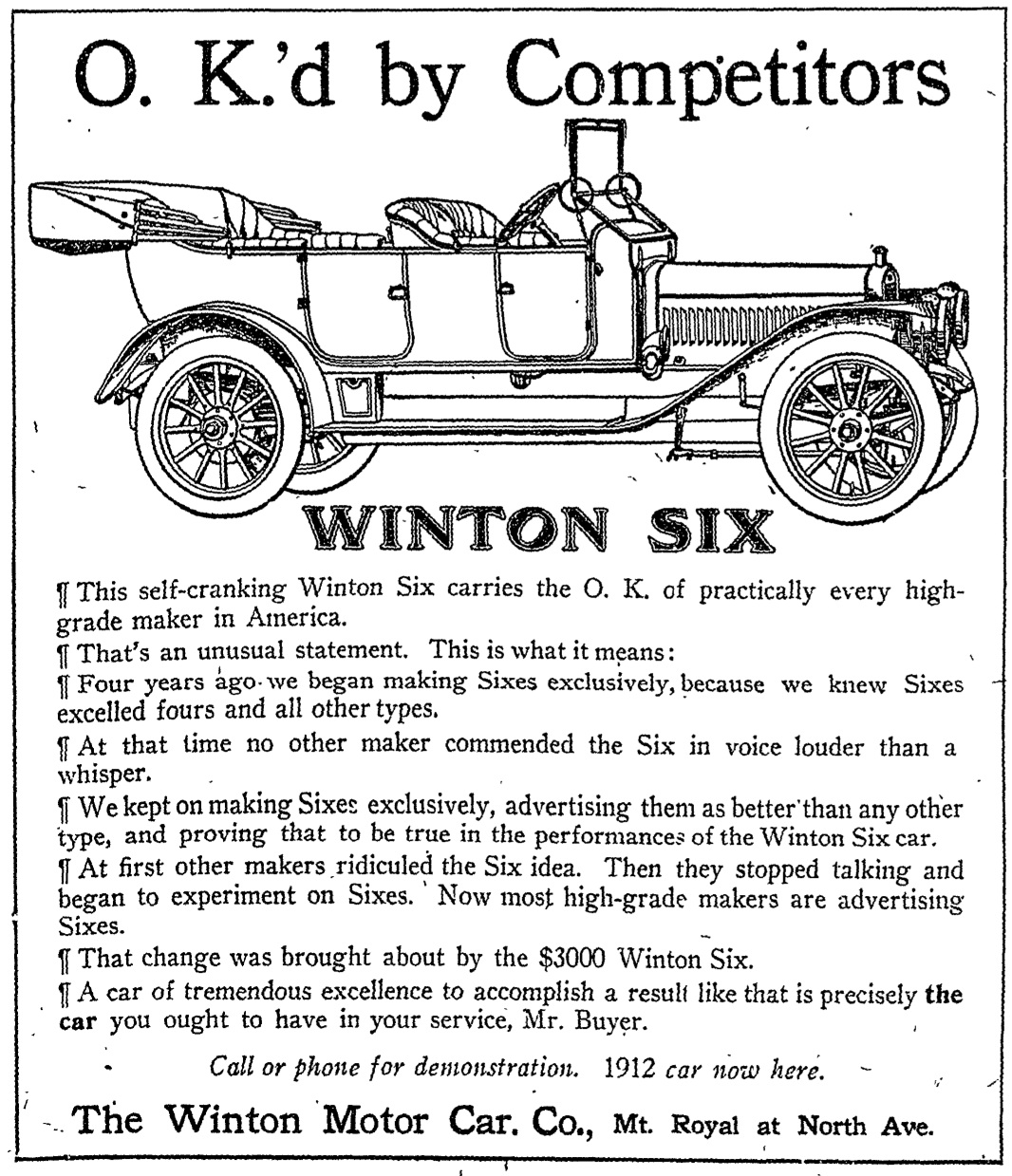
Winton Motor Company advertisement, 1911

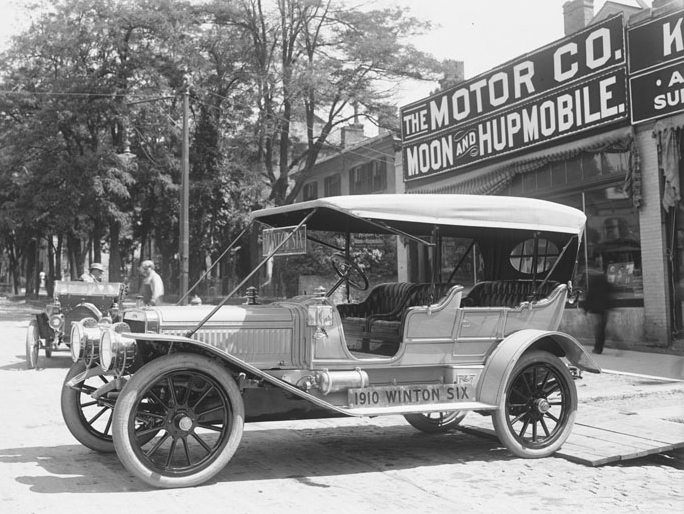
1910 Winton Six

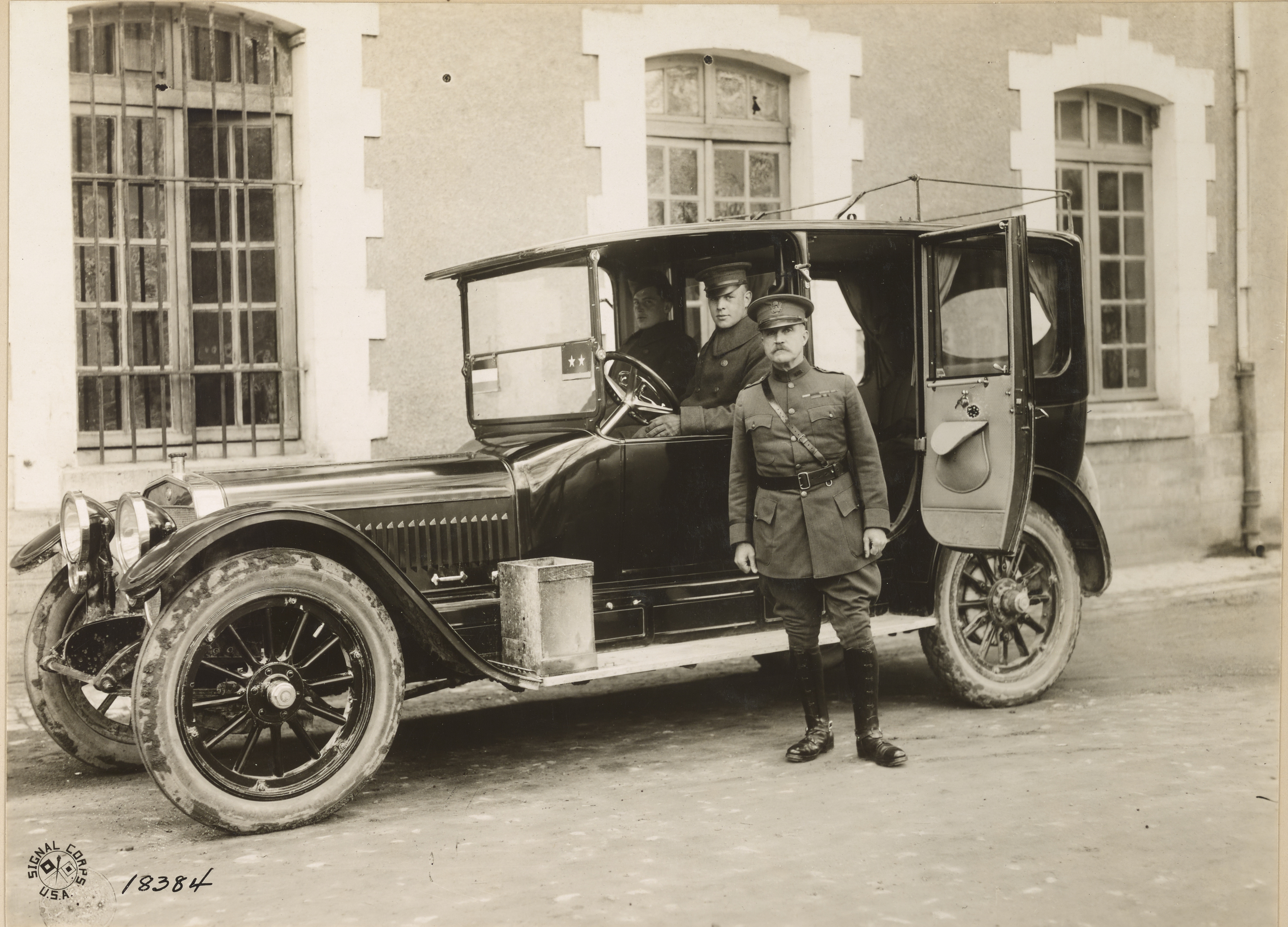
1918 Winton Six Model 33 Limousine

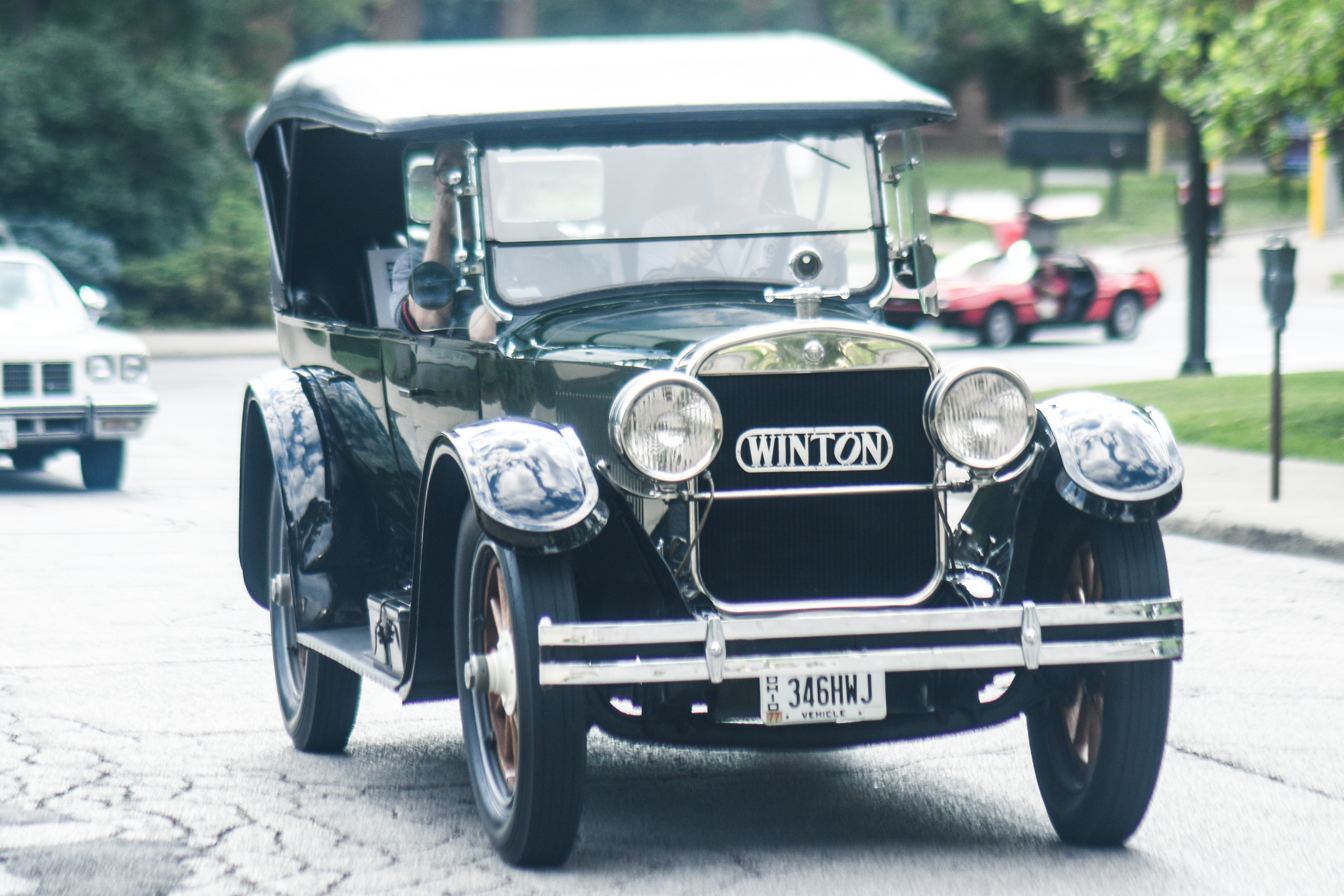
1922 Winton Six Model 40 seven-passenger touring

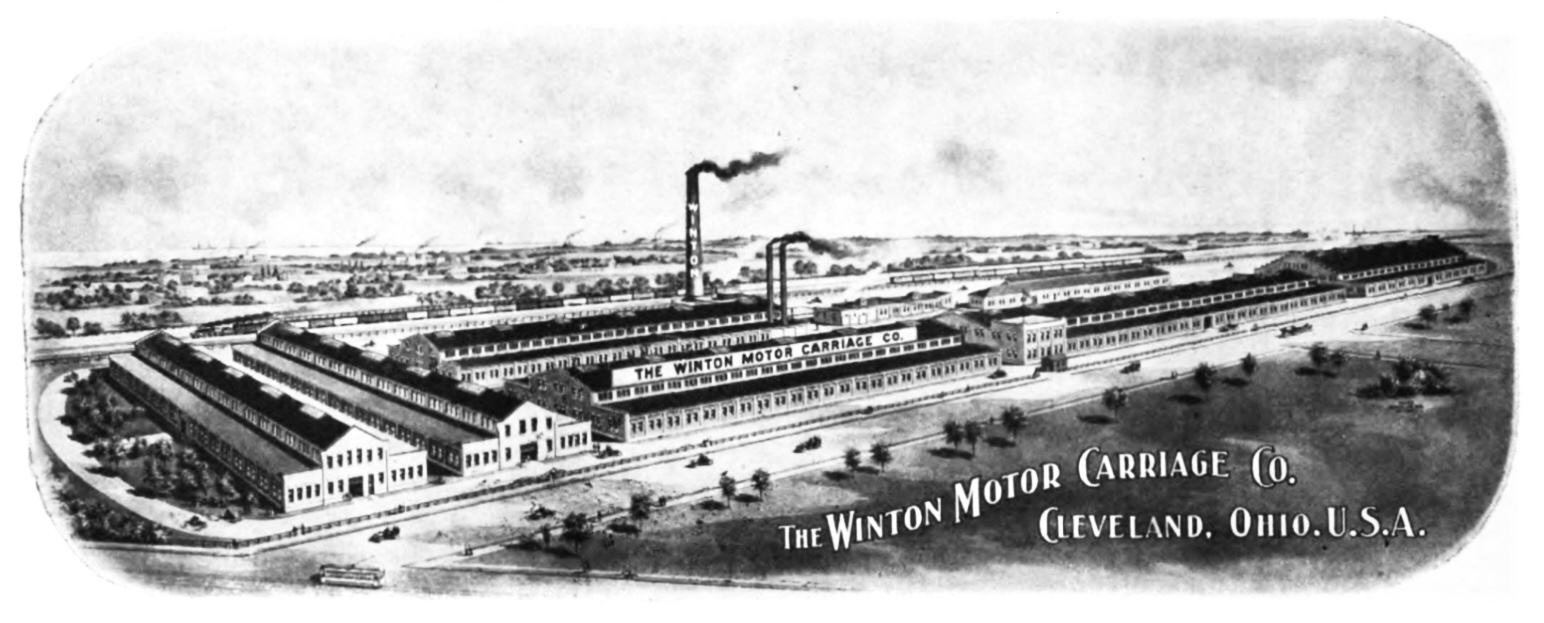
Winton plant (1903)

=== Winton Engine Company ===
In 1912, Winton started producing diesel engines for stationary and marine use, and gasoline engines for heavy vehicles, independent of Winton's automobile production. The subsidiary Winton Engine Company remained successful while Winton's automotive sales went into decline, and would outlive the Winton Motor Carriage Company. Winton became the main supplier of engines for internal combustion-electric powered railcars in the 1920s.

=== Sale to General Motors ===
On June 20, 1930, Winton Engine Company was sold to General Motors and on June 30 was reorganized as the Winton Engine Corporation subsidiary of General Motors. It produced the first practical two-stroke diesel engines in the 400-to-1,200 hp (300 to 900 kW) range, which powered the early diesel locomotives of Electro-Motive Corporation (another General Motors subsidiary), as well as United States Navy submarines. In 1934, a Winton eight-cylinder, 600 hp (450 kW) 8-201-A diesel engine powered the revolutionary streamlined passenger train the Burlington Zephyr, the first American diesel-powered mainline train. The Winton Engine Corporation provided 201 Series engines for rail use until late 1938, when it was reorganized as the General Motors Cleveland Diesel Engine Division, which produced the GM 567 series locomotive engines, and other large diesels for marine and stationary use. In 1941, locomotive engine production became part of General Motors Electro-Motive Division (EMD). In 1962, Cleveland Diesel was absorbed by Electro-Motive Division, which remains in business today as a subsidiary of Progress Rail.

=== Marine engines ===
Winton and Cleveland engines were used widely by the U.S. Navy in World War II, powering submarines, destroyer escorts, and numerous auxiliaries. The Winton engines were systematically replaced with the more reliable Cleveland Diesel engines during refittings during the war.

== Overview of production figures ==
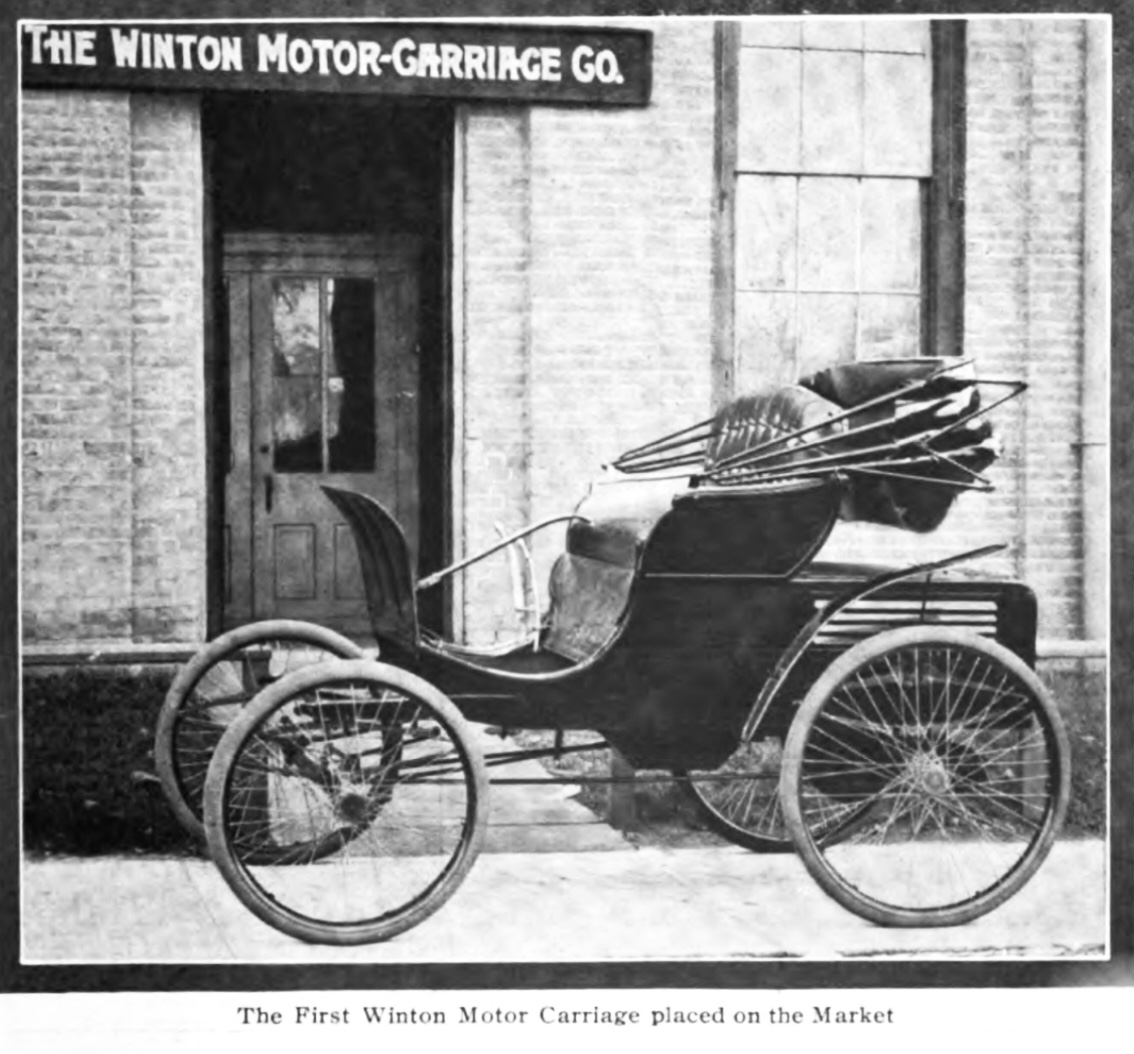
Winton Motor Carriage (1897-1899)

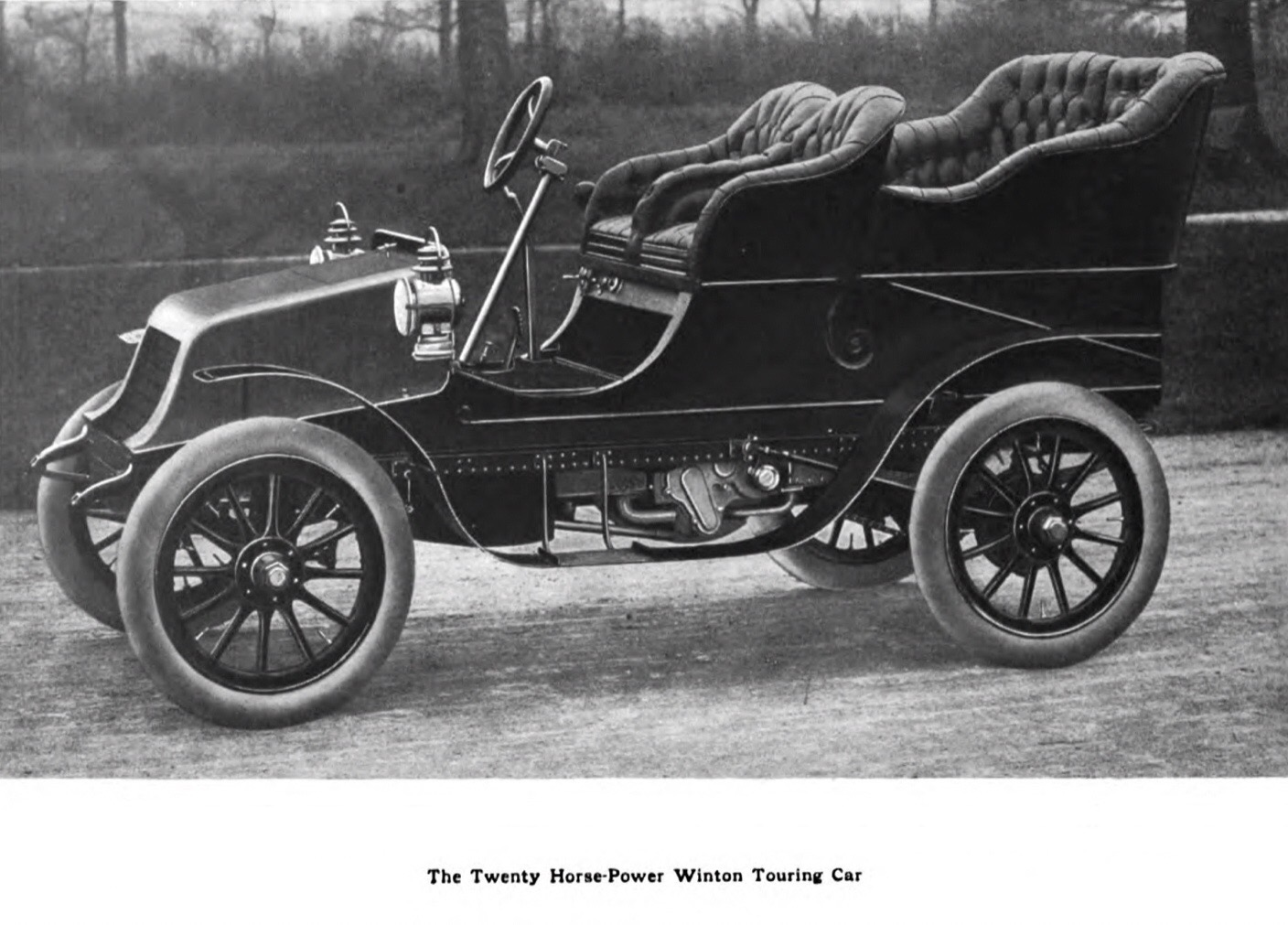
Winton Model 20 HP (1903-1904)

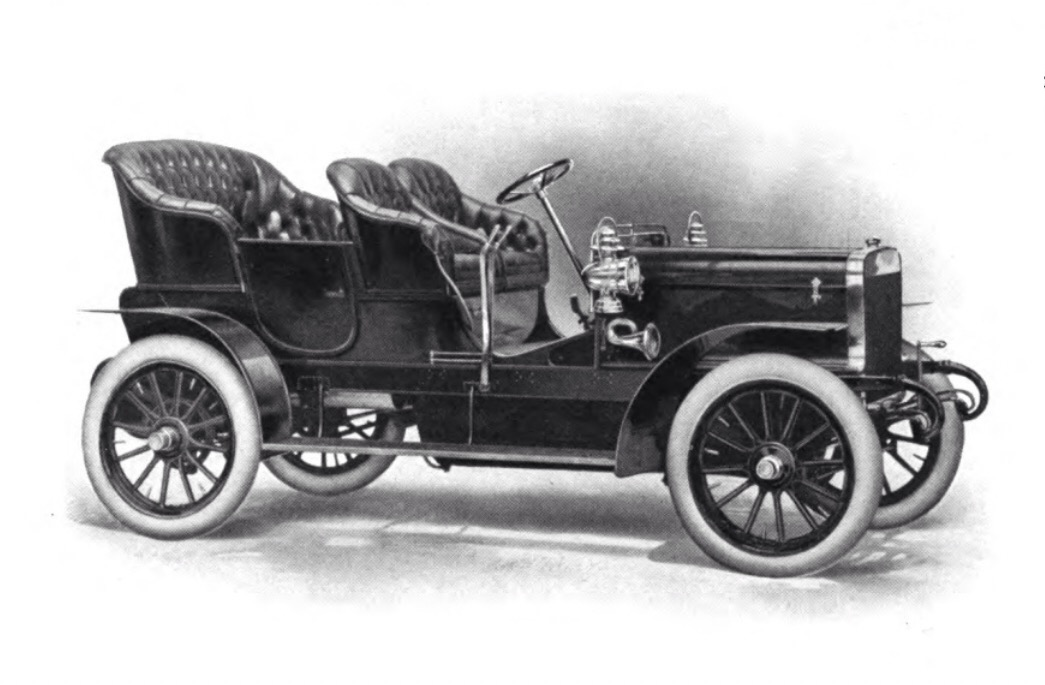
Winton Model A (1905)

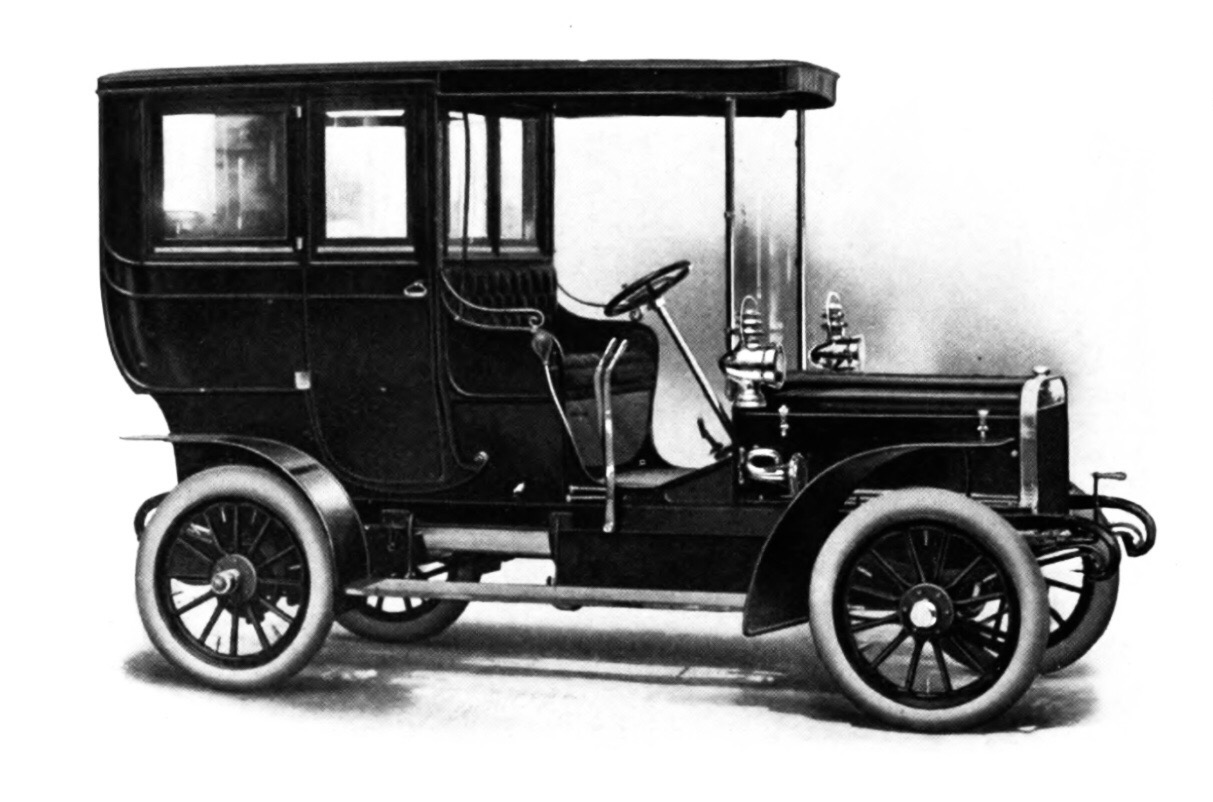
Winton Model B (1905)

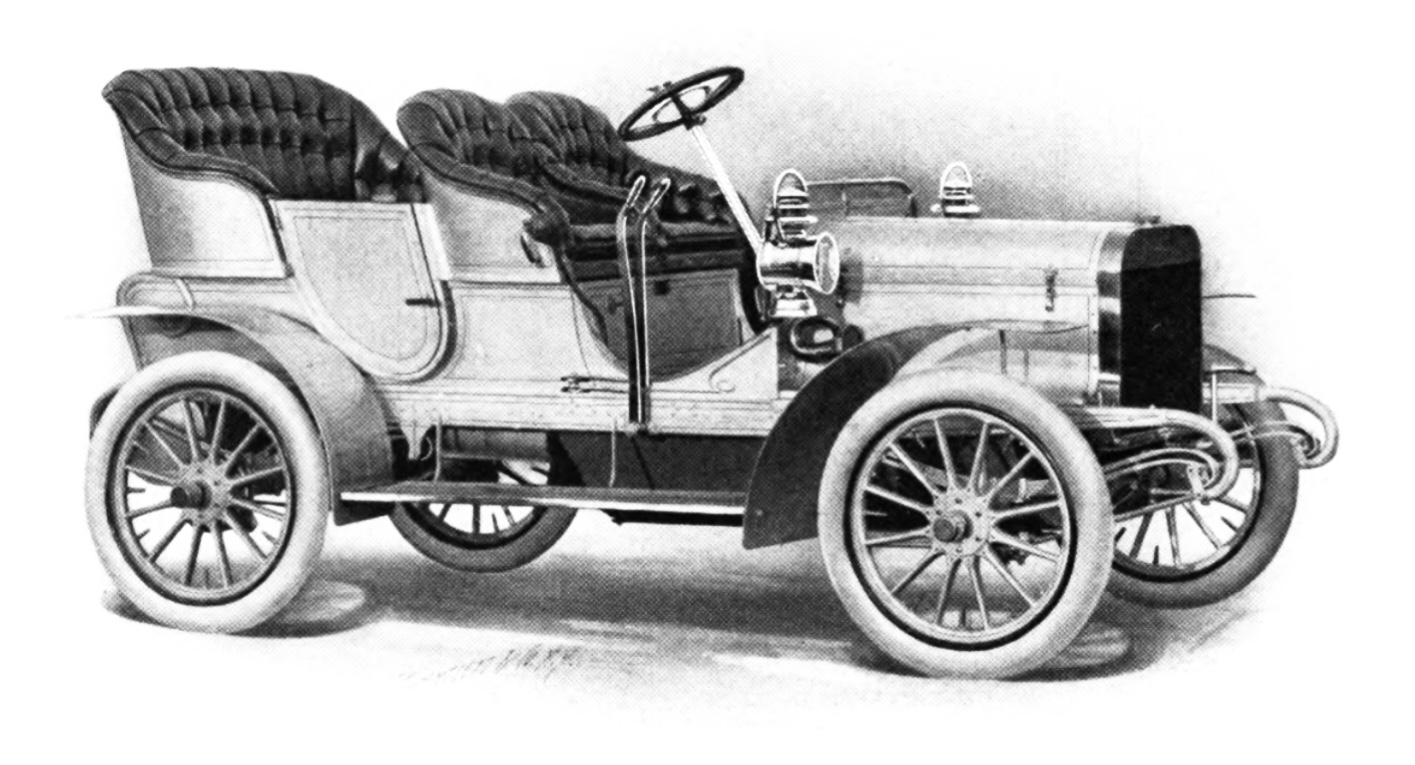
Winton Model C (1905)

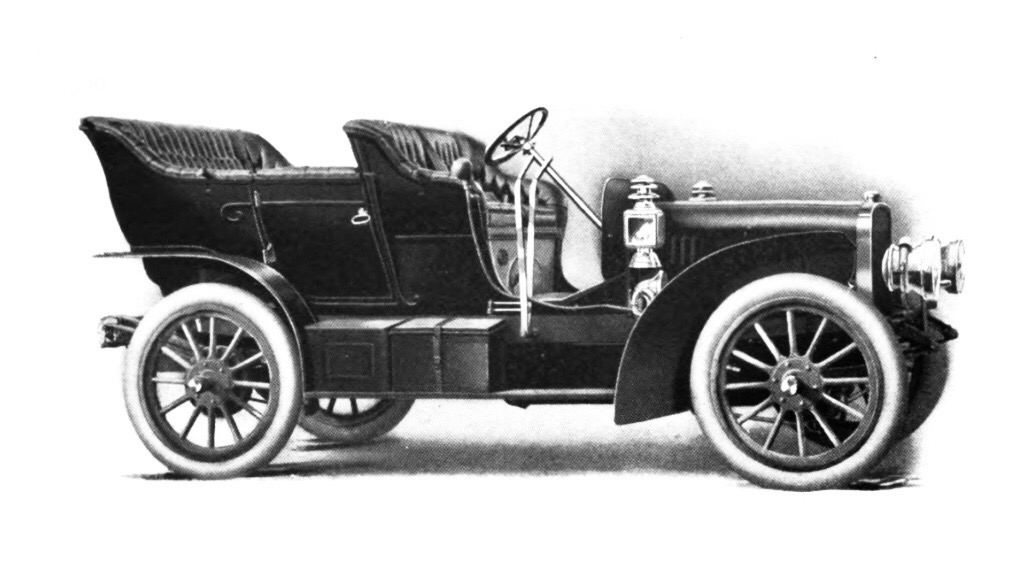
Winton Model XIV (1907)

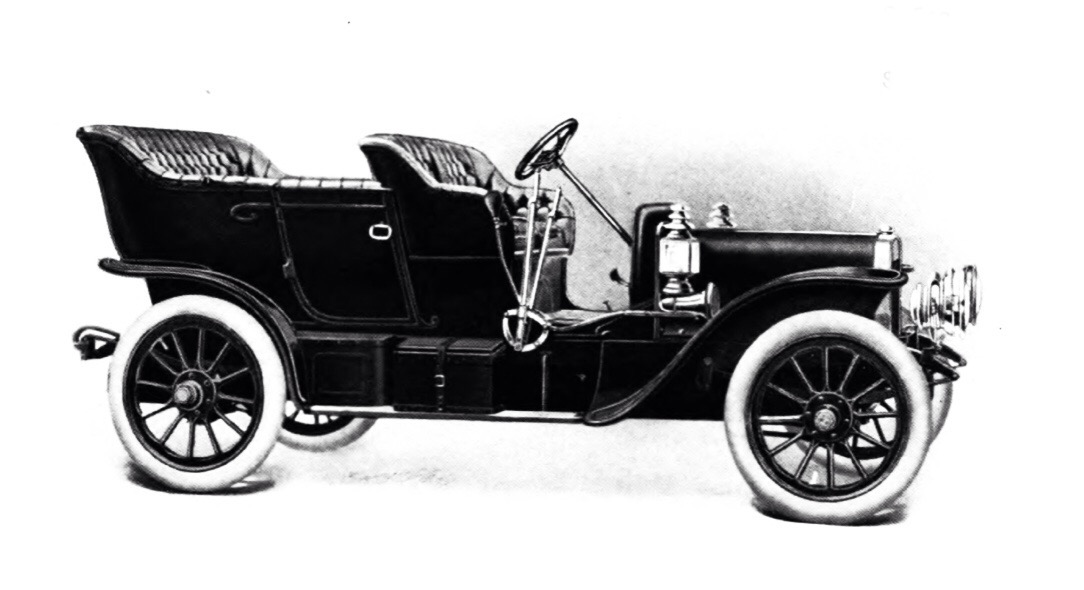
Winton Model M (1907)

Year	Production	Model
1896	2	Winton Motor Carriage
1897	6	Winton Motor Carriage
1898	22	Winton Motor Carriage
1899	106	Winton Motor Carriage
1900	218	
1901	686	
1902	633	15 HP
1903	850	20 HP
1904	900	20 HP
1905	1,000	Model A, Model B, Model C
1906	1,000	Model K
1907	1,100	Model XIV, Model M
1908	1,148	Six-Teen-Six
1909	1,218	Model 17; Model 18
1910	1,329	Model 17; Model 18
1911	1,413	Model 17 B
1912	1,518	Model 17-C
1913	1,612	Model 17-D
1914	1,518	
1915	1,816	
1916	2,458	Six-33
1917	1,818	
1918	1,623	
1919	1,319	
1920	1,160	
1921	956	
1922	561	
1923	373	
1924	129	
Sum	28,492	

== In popular culture ==
- A purpose-built "Winton Flyer" features prominently in William Faulkner's Pulitzer Prize–winning 1962 novel The Reivers. In fact, the 1969 film version of the novel starring Steve McQueen was known as The Yellow Winton Flyer in the UK.
- The 1962 episode of Dennis the Menace entitled "Horseless Carriage Club" (S03•E26), prominently features a then 50-year-old, near-perfect, 1912 Winton Six 48HP Tourer.

== See also ==
- List of defunct United States automobile manufacturers
