= Breedlove House and Water Tower =

Historic house in Arkansas, United States

- U.S. National Register of Historic Places
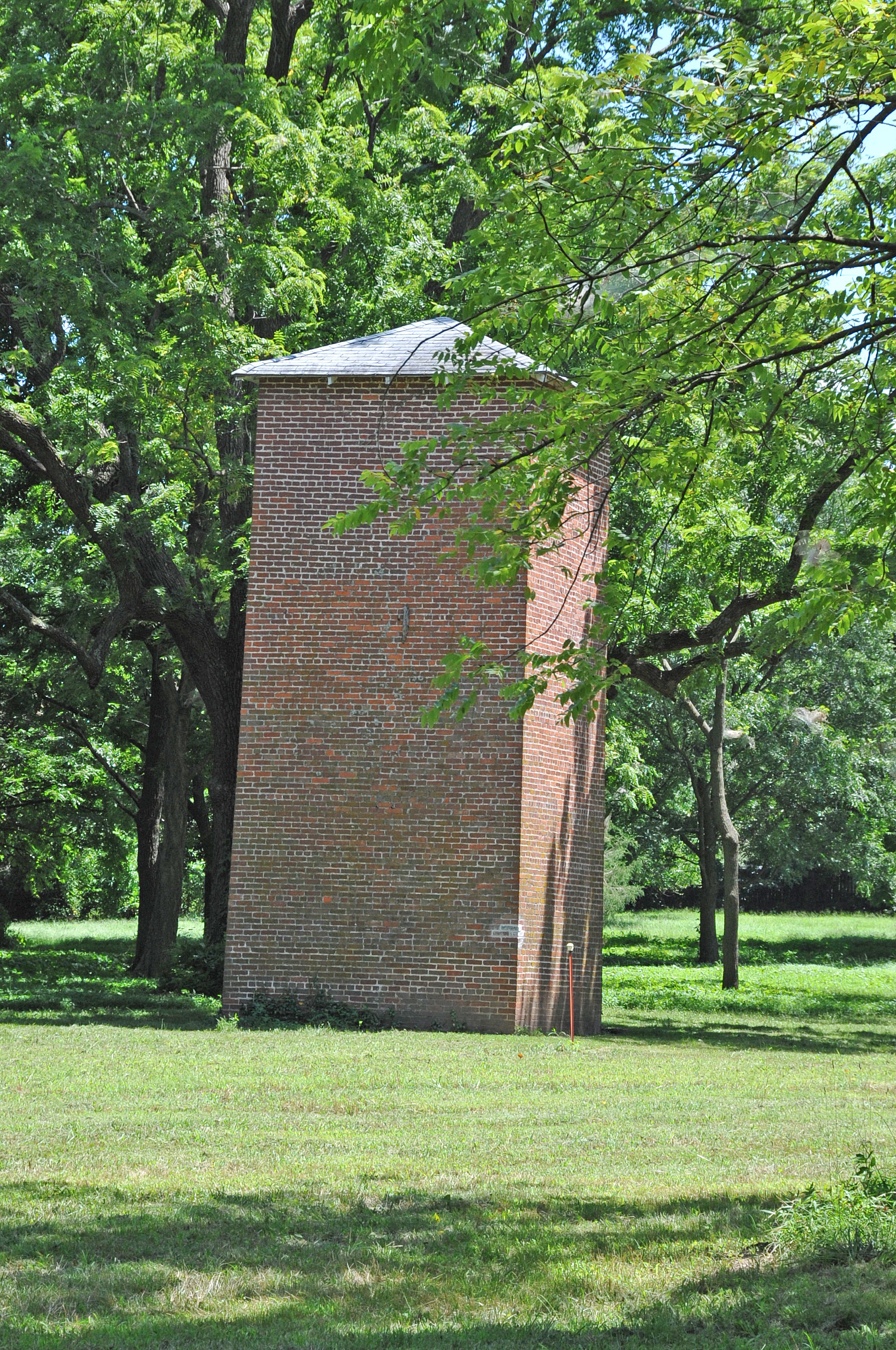

- Location within Arkansas Location within the United States
- Nearest city: Bentonville, Arkansas
- Coordinates: 36°22′10.5″N 94°10′30.3″W
- Area: less than one acre
- Built: 1887
- Architectural style: Classical Revival, Late Victorian
- MPS: Benton County MRA
- NRHP reference No.: 87002326
- Added to NRHP: January 28, 1988

The Breedlove House and Water Tower are a historic residential property on the south side Benton County Route 4 east of Bentonville, Arkansas, about 1.1 miles (1.8 km) east of its junction with Arkansas Highway 72. The two-story house is a c. 1887 brick structure that was enlarged and restyled c. 1907, giving it a mix of original Italianate and Eastlake detailing, and a front Colonial Revival two-story porch. The property includes a 28-foot (8.5 m) square brick tower, built c. 1920 as a water supply for an apple orchard. The tower is the only structure surviving in the county from the period known to be associated with the then-significant apple industry.

The property was listed on the National Register of Historic Places in 1988.

== See also ==
- National Register of Historic Places listings in Benton County, Arkansas
