= Twyford Motor Car Company =

Defunct American motor vehicle manufacturer

== Introduction ==
Robert E. Twyford had an important role in the development of the automobile. He originally started out as a building contractor in Pittsburgh, Pennsylvania, but later turned to developing automobiles. In 1900, the patent office granted him a patent for a four-wheel driving gear for motor carriages. Robert Twyford developed cars with both four-wheel drive and power-steering, first in Pittsburgh and then in Brookville, Pennsylvania. He later moved to Texas. In 1985, William McCracken began work on a replica of the Twyford automobile and finished it in 1989.

== The Twyford Automobile in Pittsburgh, Pennsylvania ==
=== Invention ===
Robert Twyford first started to build automobiles, while still living in Pittsburgh, Pennsylvania. In 1897, he invented a machine which he claimed to have superior performance over any other and planned on exhibiting it to the public soon after. The machine used connecting rods, like locomotives, and had the same design as a Park Trap, which gave it the appearance of a light, horse-drawn carriage. It had two seats, with the engine underneath the rear seat. The machine applied traction to all four wheels, had self-gearing, and allowed steering from both the front and rear axle. Robert Twyford also stated that he would soon have a new engine. He had not yet decided when he would begin manufacturing the carriage.

On July 7, 1898, he applied for a patent for a “Driving Gear for Motor Carriages”, which the patent office finally granted him on April 3, 1900. Figure 1 shows the patent drawings. They have the automobile powered by an electric motor.

=== Design ===
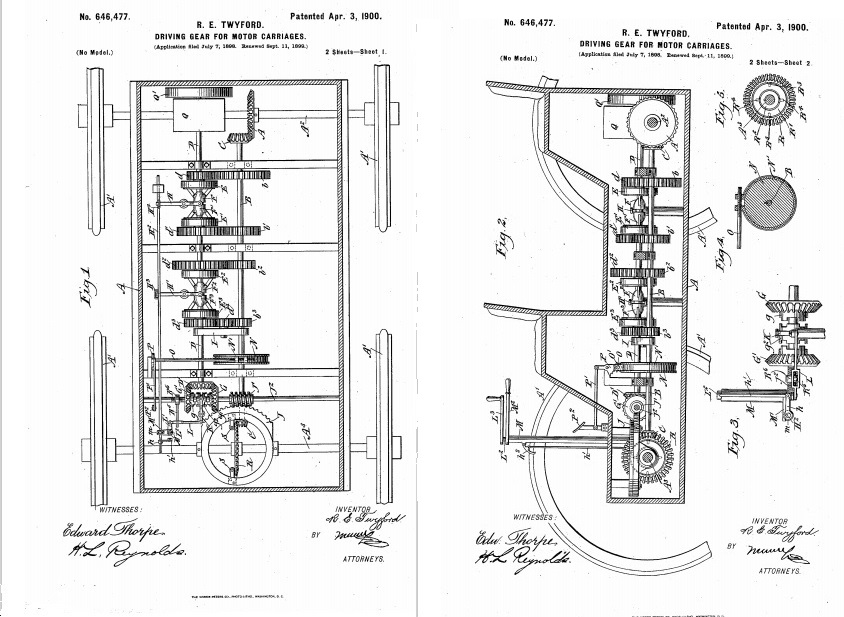
Figure 1. Driving Gear for Motor Carriages

While waiting for the approval of the patent, Robert Twyford and his sponsors organized the Twyford Motor Vehicle Company in Pittsburgh, Pennsylvania in May 1898. The patent drawings show an automobile with a complicated arrangement of gears and shafts that provided a crude form of four-wheel drive and power-steering.

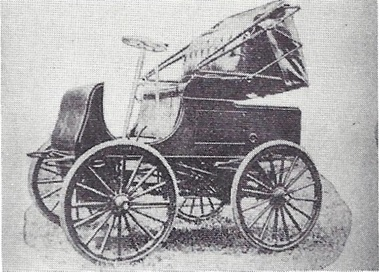
Figure 2. 1902 Twyford Stanhope

For four-wheel drive, the drawings have a shaft going the complete length of the chassis, which has two sets of friction clutches. One friction clutch works with the lower and second gears, while the second friction clutch works with the high and reverse gears. The drawings also show a second shaft, parallel to the first shaft, which has gears meshing with the gears on the first shaft. The second shaft drives the rear axle with a bevel gear and the front axle with a three-part bevel gear, which acts as a primitive form of universal joint. The driving-gear did not use differential gears.

The power-steering involved the use of a solid shaft, which lacked steering knuckles. A worm-gear connected the shaft to the front axle. A steering lever allowed two bevel gears on the cross-shaft to turn the automobile. The front-axle has an arm, which prevented oversteering, and a lever that disengaged the bevel gears when the wheels locked. This mechanism only provided a slow rate of turning, most likely making sharp turns difficult to navigate.

Although the drawing has an electric motor, most likely Robert Twyford planned on using a gasoline engine, because the three speed gear design would have quickly drained the electric batteries in use at the time.

=== Early difficulties ===
The literature makes no further mention of the Twyford automobile until the January 1901 issue of Cycle & Automobile Trade Journal. The article lists a variety of models, but most likely the company only manufactured the Stanhope, if even that. The name, Stanhope, refers to an archaic car body style that used a single bench seat, and a folding cloth top. The name comes from the Stanhope. The picture of the 1902 Twyford Stanhope automobile in Figure 2 appears in the April 1902 issue of the Cycle & Automobile Trade Journal. The automobile in the picture has a gasoline engine, and the company had simplified the drivetrain from what appears in the patent drawings. The 17th September issue of Horseless Age has the company located at 5920 Penn Avenue in Pittsburgh and having a new gasoline automobile coming out soon.

It also has the company erecting a large plant. The article mentions R. E. Twyford as the company's engineer and J. F. Trembly as the manager. Apparently, the company failed in Pittsburgh, because the newspapers and trade journals make no further mention of the company until 1904. Robert Twyford then decided to find a location for building automobiles elsewhere. Two investors, E. A. Carmalt and Strong, agreed to help provide financial backing, under the condition that he relocate to Brookville, Pennsylvania.

== The Twyford Automobile in Brookville, Pennsylvania ==
=== Incorporation ===
In May 1904, Robert E. Twyford claimed, that after developing a prototype for five years, he now had an automobile that would run over rough and muddy roads and allow any member of a family to drive it safely. His patents protected the automobile's design, and he would turn them over to the newly organized company. If the people of Brookville would provide a location for the factory, and buy $25,000 worth of stock, he would have the factory built and begin manufacturing automobiles. The decline in the lumber industry, which Brookville had relied on before then, meant that the community needed to find new sources of revenue.

The Brookville Republican May 26, 1904 issue praised Robert Twyford's patent as describing a unique machine with a pronounced advantage over any other automobile manufactured at the time, featuring power to both front and rear axles, and leading in the automobile world. The company planned to manufacture four-wheel drive automobiles, auto-trucks and motor-cars.

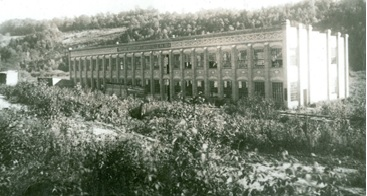
Figure 3. The Twyford Motor-Car Company Brookville, Pennsylvania

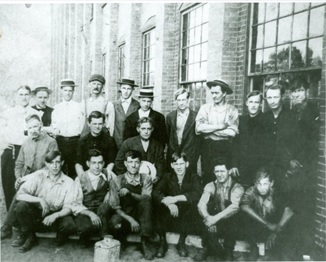
Figure 4. Workers at the Twyford Motor-Car Company Factory

Robert E. Twyford succeeded in organizing the Twyford Motor-Car Company in Brookville. The company had raised $25,000 in capital stock and named the following men as directors: R. E. Twyford, A. D. Deemer, H. C. Beach, D. L. Taylor, E. A. Carmalt, C. A. French, W. N. Humphrey, W. N. Vanleer and W. D. Shields, with A. D. Deemer acting as president, W. N. Humphrey as vice president, R. E. Twyford as general manager and D. L. Taylor as secretary and treasurer. The directors decided to locate the new factory near the railroad, the glass plant, and the furniture factory and had begun construction. Carmalt and Strong (attorneys-at-law) donated the land for the factory. Workers had already started the process of cleaning the ground, and digging the foundations for the factory, which would have brick walls, measurements of 50 feet by 200 feet and two stories.

The directors organized the company under Delaware Corporate law, and had capital stock of $500,000, with $200,000 of that offered for sale at $50.00 per share. By late September, the workers had finished the building, except for installing machinery. The construction of automobiles began in late 1904.

=== Construction ===
In 1905, the Twyford Motor-Car Company announced the construction of the models for that year. These included an 18-hp 4-passenger Tonneau (priced at $2,700), an 8 hp (6.0 kW; 8.1 PS) delivery (priced at $1,000), an 8 hp (6.0 kW; 8.1 PS) runabout, a 10 hp (7.5 kW; 10 PS) Stanhope, and a 10 hp (7.5 kW; 10 PS) roadster. All the cars used two-cylinder two cycle engines.

According to the local press, the Twyford automobile had four-wheel drive, which allowed it to climb steep grades, and travel through mud, snow and unpaved roads. If a car with only two-wheel drive gets stuck in a hole, it only has one wheel to pull it out, while the Twyford automobile could pull it out with three wheels.

The Twyford automobile had power-steering, which allowed the driver to guide it without effort. The Twyford also did not use knuckle joints. Instead, it used a rigid steering mechanism, which prevented pressure on the steering-wheel.

The automobile did not use chains, sprockets, or spur gears, which tend to get full of dirt. Instead the automobile applied power directly to the four wheels. The design for the automobile had self-oiling gears held inside a dust-proof casing. The brakes on the Twyford locked all four wheels. The brakes worked on the transmission box, which carried the braking to the wheels. The Twyford also had a brake for the reverse lever, and the driving lever controlled a third brake.

The front axle oscillated, which allowed the front wheels to raise or lower when passing over unpaved roads. This prevented twisting of the machine's body and allowed the automobile to smoothly travel. The Twyford changed speed with a single lever that controlled a friction clutch. The automobile had two forward speeds and single reverse speed. It also equally applied power between the front and rear axles and distributed the power between the four wheels. This eliminated drag when making a curve, which meant that automobile would not skid. The Twyford's axles consisted of solid steel, with no knuckle joints, which gave the car strength and durability.

=== Automobile shows ===
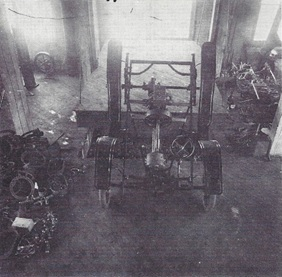
Figure 5. A Twyford Chassis in the Factory

In March 1905, R. E. Twyford, along with C. A. French, attended the Buffalo Automobile Show. No automobile at the show, other than the Twyford, possessed four-wheel drive. The Twyford Company exhibited two complete automobiles, along with a chassis. The Twyford attracted a great deal of attention, because of all the differences it had in comparison to the other automobiles at the exhibit. The attendants at the exhibit especially admired the simplicity of the Twyford because the automobile operated with a single shaft.

The Twyford especially attracted the interest of the medical practitioners because most of them traveled to patients’ homes over often poorly maintained roads. The machines’ four-wheel drive, power, and simplicity especially interested them. Many doctors visited the exhibit every day and eagerly awaited its development.

The machine also attracted the interest of businessmen and technicians. J. M. Yadkin, manager of Adams Express Company, Mr. Henry A. Kamman, a pork and beef packer, and H. C. Gardner, a milk dealer, all admired the machine. They especially liked the Twyford's simplicity compared to other machines. W. A. Liggett, a building contractor, wanted to buy the machine, and sell his horse and buggy. George Willaofer, who had two brothers working as doctors, liked the four-wheel drive, because it would allow the machine to travel through sand, or even off-road. Charles Heidrick, superintendent of the Pittsburgh, Summerville and Clarion railroad, had an engineer look over the machine, and was very impressed with it. Another engineer admired the machines ability to drive, steer and compensate all at once. A draftsman also admired the machine.

After this experience, the board of directors of the Twyford Company wanted to buy more machinery, hire more men, and even build a new factory. They also wanted to sell more stock. Brookville residents visited the factory, to see the new machines built there. They all enjoyed the experience, and what the workers had managed to accomplish.

After the Buffalo Automobile show, R. E. Twyford had the automobiles shipped to a show in Washington D. C. Robert Twyford managed to book several orders for the machine, and had to turn down one hundred orders, because of the limited production capacity of the factory, and especially a lack of capitol to supply the demand.

If he had succeeded in filling the orders, the company would have made around $112,000. If he had attended the larger shows, like in New York City, Philadelphia, Chicago and Boston, and able to fill orders there also, the company could have made $562,500.

In taking his car to Washington, where all the skilled men and attorneys were at the patent office, Robert Twyford knew he had the best invention. The patent attorneys agreed it was "one of the wonders of the world" and the finest invention of an automobile to date.

The company now needed the board to revive the stock sale campaign to obtain more capitol and expand operations, so the company could manufacture enough cars to keep up with demand.

=== Automobile demonstrations ===
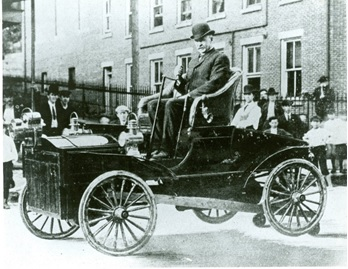
Figure 6. Robert Twyford demonstrates driving a nine HP Twyford Runabout with only the front wheels.

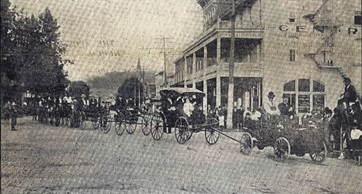
Figure 7. Demonstration of the pulling power of a nine HP Twyford runabout hauling eight carriages and forty passengers from a stand still in high gear

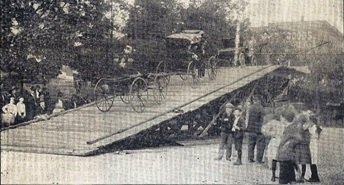
Figure 8. Demonstration of a nine HP runabout ascending a twenty-five percent grade, hauling two vehicles and ten passengers

Robert Twyford then asked to have one of his old cars repaired and repainted and planned to drive it from his home to the factory. He intended to prove to any doubters the quality of the car, by driving the car himself down Main Street.

A reporter from the Jeffersonian Democrat visited the factory on May 12, 1905. He found fifteen men busy at work, with several cars in various stages of construction. The factory produced all the parts for the car, except for the wheels, tires and lamps. Robert Twyford himself supervised the chassis and engine shop, along with C. A. French. Ralph Reitz supervised the body shop, where the workmen built the wooden bodies. Figure 4 shows the workers at the factory. Figure 5 shows a picture of a Twyford runabout chassis inside the factory, most likely taken in 1905. This shows the primitive conditions that the workers had to use in manufacturing the automobiles. The parts to the left of the chassis include fifth-wheel gears for the front axle steering mechanism. The plant had the dimensions of 200x50 feet and two stories. It had the most modern equipment for working on both iron and wood.

Robert Twyford, to demonstrate the pulling power of the cars, on July 12, 1905, drove a 9 hp runabout down Main Street in Brookville. As shown in Figure 6, he fitted the rear-wheels to a wooden frame, using castors, which showed that he could drive the car with only the front-wheels. Then, as shown in Figure 7, with the frame removed, he towed two carriages containing five passengers up a 14.5 percent grade. The picture shows Robert Twyford at the steering wheel, with his foreman, Mr. Ralph Reitz, beside him. Figure 8 also demonstrates the Twyford's towing power. But, the demonstration involved a specially prepared runabout. Robert Twyford had the machine geared down for maximum power at the expense of high speed. The car, as prepared, only had a maximum speed of 9 mph.

Robert Twyford brought two or three of his machines to the Brookville Fair in September 1905. The press declared them “the finest exhibit on the fairgrounds outside of the livestock”. He sold a Twyford Type A touring car, the only known sale of a Twyford motor car in town.

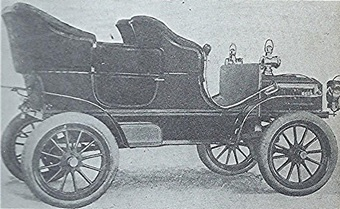
Figure 9. Five Passenger Twyford Type A Tonneau

Then, in December 1905, Robert Twyford brought out a large, five-passenger car, like the car shown in Figure 9. A reporter observed Robert Twyford driving the car through town and allowing several Brookville citizens to ride in it. He reported that the car, with its four-wheel drive, would drive through mud, unpaved roads and through snow and ice. It would also run up and down steep hills.

=== Bankruptcy ===
In December, 1905, rumors of false reports concerning the merits of the Twyford still circulated, even though the company presented a new car "of rich, artistic design. A marvel of beauty" and that "it runs where other autos cannot go." It was thought the company ought to be able to sell enough cars to employ 600 men before the end of 1906.

In January, 1906, the company issued its first and only sales pamphlet, describing the advantages of the Twyford four-wheel-drive and photographs of the Twyford's June 1905 demonstrations and drawings of various models offered.

But in July 1906, despite showings at major auto shows and demonstrations in Brookville, the Twyford Motor-Car Company had serious financial difficulties. The company arranged to pay off its debts and start anew, and Robert Twyford had retired from the company's management. Before, Robert Twyford had held 51 percent of the company's stock. From now on, he would only hold 10 percent. The board of directors stated that the company had the purpose of manufacturing automobiles, and if the company could not perfect the Twyford automobile to their satisfaction, they would start manufacturing a different one. They intended to increase the capital and make production successful.

The company only experimented with manufacturing automobiles, without going into actual production. It would have had much greater success if it had manufactured only one type of automobile, like the runabout, instead of experimenting with several different styles.

Most likely, the crudeness of the Twyford's four-wheel drive and experimental two-cycle engine proved riskier than the company's directors realized. After Robert Twyford left, the local press made no more mention of the company, though the February 1907 issue of Motor listed a complete line of Twyford motor cars that the company never built.

A comparison with a similar company that succeeded can help demonstrate why the Twyford Motor-Car Company failed, namely with the Four Wheel Drive Auto Company of Clintonville, Wisconsin. In 1905, Otto Zachow and William Besserdich invented a four-wheel drive system, encased in a drop-forged ball, utilizing a lockable center differential with a double-Y universal joint that operated at the juncture of the front wheel and axle for steering. This means they invented a four-wheel drive design far superior to what Robert Twyford invented. The patent office granted them a patent in 1908. Walter A. Olen, a local attorney, helped organize and promote the company. He also recognized from the beginning that trucks had the real market for four-wheel drive vehicles, not passenger cars. But in defense of Robert Twyford, far more automobile manufacturers back then failed than succeeded.

The Twyford Motor-Car Company went into bankruptcy in December 1908 with obligations of over $20,000. In March 1909, two brothers, Wilbert Newton and James Malcolm Humphrey Jr., (of Humphrey Brick and Tile Company and sons of James Humphrey Sr.) bought the factory for $12,000, including the machinery and patents. At the time, the factory contained one car that the workers at the factory had completed, and one or two partially completed cars. Mr. Humphrey sold these cars for around $500.

=== Later history ===
In August 1909, J. E. Humphrey sold the factory to New York parties, and hoped that the new owners would have success in utilizing the factory for manufacturing. They planned on making harvesting equipment, had perfected a car like the Twyford, also featuring four-wheel drive.

But, no one actually used the former Twyford factory until the Union Auto Specialties Company, founded by James M. Humphrey Jr., moved in around 1913. In 1915–1916, the company built windshields. James Malcolm acted as president of the company, as well as general manager of the Humphrey Brick and Tile Company. The Union Auto Specialties Company succeeded and continued to operate until around 1970. The Matson Wood Products Company then bought the building and decided to remove the second story with a winch line, causing the entire building to collapse.

== The Twyford Automobile in Texas ==
After the failure of the Twyford Motor-Car Company in Brookville, Pennsylvania, Robert Twyford moved to Houston, Texas. There, he contacted two brothers, L. J. and Z. Z. Brandon. Using the Twyford patent, they founded the Commercial Motor Car Company in San Antonio and Houston, Texas in 1912. They built a prototype car and truck. But the company had financial difficulties and Robert Twyford no longer owned the four-wheel drive patent. The plant closed in less than a year. A creditor, F. E. George, had a court order issued, which placed the company under receivership. The stated reason for the company's failure was that it had tried to build trucks but did not build enough of them to attract any attention. Robert Twyford had his patent renewed in 1915, as shown in Figure 10, but apparently no longer tried building four-wheel drive vehicles. He spent the rest of his life in Houston, Texas, and died in 1942.

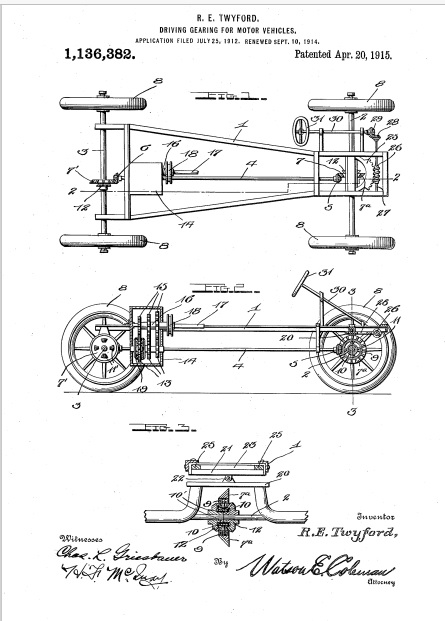
Figure 10. Driving Gear for Motor Vehicles

== The Twyford Automobile replica ==
=== Design and construction ===
In 1985, William McCracken, a retired mechanic at the time living in Richardsville, Pennsylvania, began building a replica of the original Twyford, "because there weren't any". In an article in the Tri-County, August 13, 1985, William McCracken stated, "There were only five built, but the runabout is the only one I can prove was built." Back in the 1930s, he had worked as a sweeper for the Union Auto Specialties Company, in the building in Brookville where the Twyford Motor-Car Company had built the original Twyford. His uncle and supervisor both taught him how to make measurements, including measuring a support post. Many years later, he found a picture of the support post, and a Twyford chassis, shown in Figure 5.

He used photographs of the chassis and many other parts. He also used the original patent copies, but discovered they were not much help. He said the patents just showed a buggy with four-wheel drive. It could have used any kind of engine. The two-cycle engine that the Twyford used no longer existed. So instead, he used a two-cycle engine that has 10 hp around 350 rpm. The early models of the Twyford lacked differentials. When a car turns a corner, the outer wheels travel faster than the inner wheels. The early Twyford's wheels failed to compensate for this, which caused the axles to twist while going around corners. In 1907, they did start using limited slip differentials to correct the problem.

William McCracken visited Detroit, Michigan, and found differentials from a 1923 Chevrolet, and used them in his replica. In building his replica, William McCracken made a few compromises. Instead of using the original wheels, he used the largest wheels that he could fit with tires. He built the parts that he couldn't find, and soon began assembling the car. At the time he first started assembling the car, he only lacked the cast iron gears for the steering mechanism.

William McCracken finally used dirt bike tires for his replica, after he had tried several years experimenting with several different wheels. He used a three-armed master rim tool to fit the tires around the wheel. He first fastened the tool to the rim of the wheel, and then cranked the tool, which allowed the tight-fitting spring metal on the rim to give enough for him to slip on the tire. William McCracken also had special help from Emmery Strohm of Brookville, Pennsylvania in restoring the fenders. He learned how to roll the steel fenders and put iron beading on the fenders.

=== Exhibition ===
William McCracken finally finished the automobile in 1989. He first drove the car in parades, including the Western Pennsylvania Laurel Festival parade, and exhibited at auto shows. He then decided to donate the car to a museum. Although he had several offers from museums to exhibit the car, he instead planned to the donate it to the Jefferson County History Center in Brookville, Pennsylvania. The building's preservation had begun in 2001 and the museum staff had already set aside an area for the Twyford.

In November 2005, volunteer workers moved the Twyford replica into the museum at the Jefferson County History Center, in Brookville, Pennsylvania. A tilt bed truck carried the replica from Richardsville to the museum. They then removed two large glass panes in front of the museum, to move the car into the building's gallery. Figure 11 shows the Twyford replica on display at its permanent home in the main first floor of Parker Gallery.

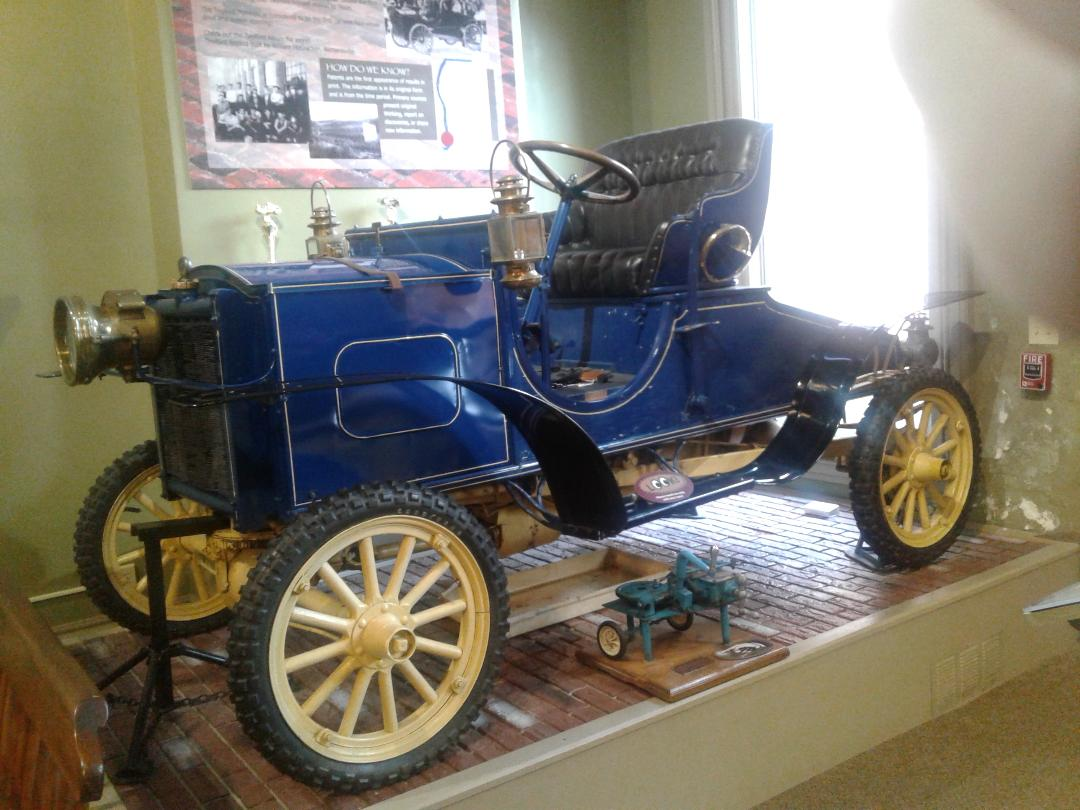
Figure 11. Today, thousands of visitors have viewed the Twyford replica at the Jefferson County History Center, built by William McCracken.
