= Death of Robert Twyford =

English policeman shot in 1806

Robert Twyford was a watchman in Birmingham, England, who was shot in July 1806 while carrying out his duties, and died as a result in November 1814. Philip Matsell, a former sailor, was hanged for the shooting. His guilt has since been disputed.

== Background ==
In the first decade of the 19th century, Birmingham was, thanks to the industrial revolution, a rapidly-expanding town in the county of Warwickshire. Prior to Birmingham's incorporation in 1838, and the establishment of the Birmingham Town Police in the following year, watchmen were employed to patrol the streets at night. Robert Twyford was one such watchman.

Public executions were common at the time, and those for crimes committed in Birmingham, tried at Warwick Assizes, usually took place at Gallows Hill, Stoneleigh.

== Shooting and death ==
On the night of 15 July 1806, Twyford was patrolling the Snow Hill area of Birmingham, when he approached a group of suspicious characters, one of whom shot him, before they fled. The bullet entered his chest, passed through his lungs and lodged in his shoulder. It was removed during surgery by George Freer, after which there were still fears for his life. Nonetheless he recovered, but was too ill to return to work, and with no welfare system in place, his family became destitute. In 1814 he underwent further surgery, for a strangulated hernia, but developed a bad cough and died on 22 November that year, aged 54. A post mortem determined that the hernia operation had been successful, but that his lungs remained badly damaged by the shooting.

== Conviction ==
Philip Matsell, then aged 30, a former sailor and a highwayman, was accused of the shooting, convicted at the Old Bailey on the evidence of an accomplice who turned King's evidence, and was sentenced to death, with a pardon conditional on being transported to Australia. An attempted escape resulted in the reinstatement of the capital sentence. The execution by hanging took place on 22 August 1806 at the corner of Great Charles Street and Snow Hill, close to the site of the shooting, witnessed by an estimated 40,000 people. It was the first and only public execution in Birmingham. (Note: The last public hanging in England, of Michael Barrett, occurred in London in May 1868.)

It was subsequently claimed that, at the time of the shooting, Matsell was drunk in a nearby public house and so could not have been the gunman.

== Legacy ==
Robert Twyford is commemorated on the West Midlands Police's roll of honour, (Note: West Midlands Police are the successor to Birmingham Town, later Birmingham City, Police.) displayed at its Lloyd House headquarters, in Birmingham, since 2018.

A Birmingham Civic Society plaque marks the site of Matsell's execution.

In 2012 Kay Hunter, an amateur historian, suggested that Matsell had been framed by his erstwhile lover, Kit Pedley, a "femme fatal".
