= Mims-Breedlove-Priest-Weatherton House =

Historic house in Arkansas, United States

- U.S. National Register of Historic Places
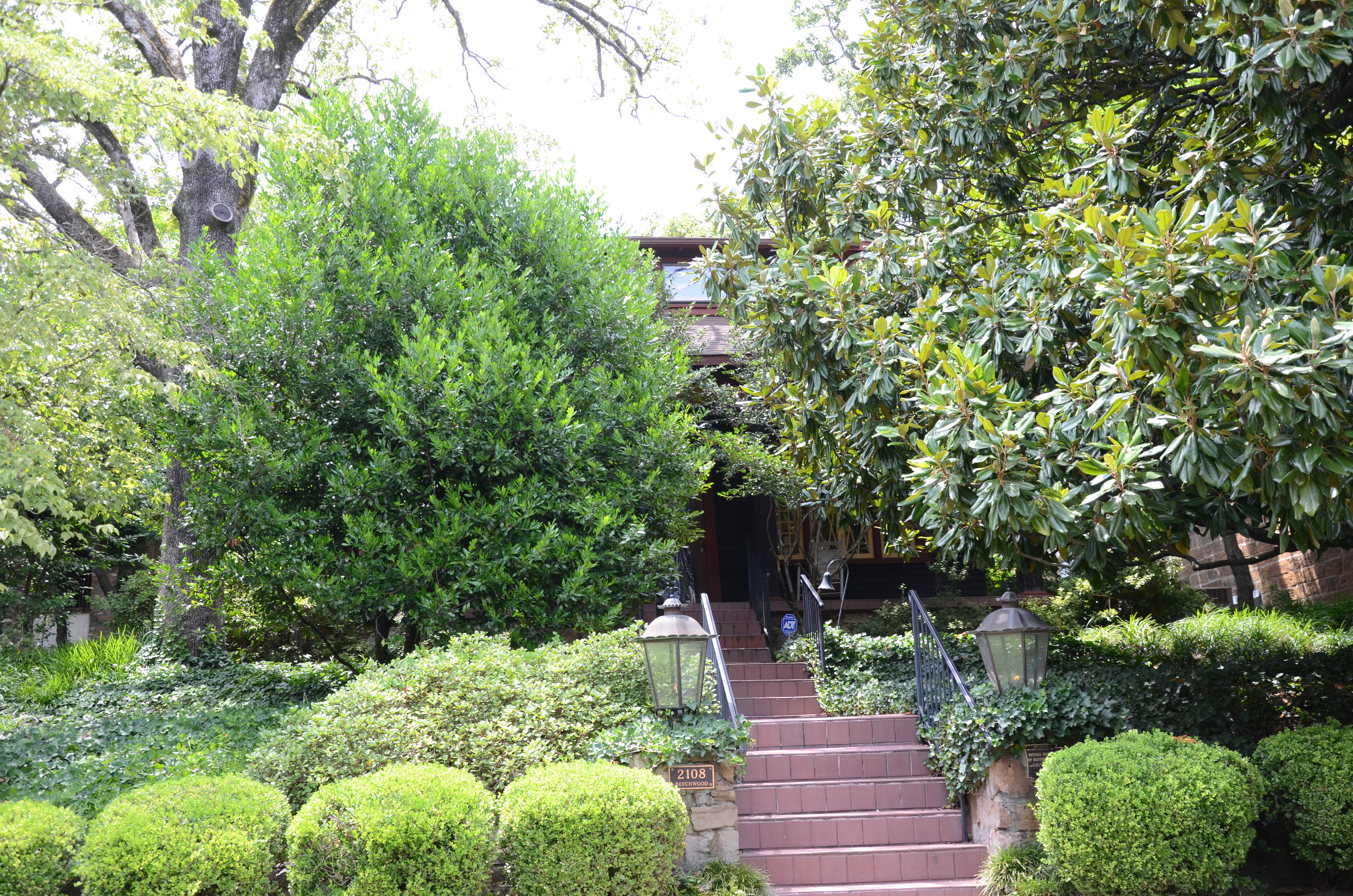

- Location within Arkansas Location within the United States
- Location: 2108 Beechwood Ave., Little Rock, Arkansas
- Coordinates: 34°46′21″N 92°19′28″W
- Area: less than one acre
- Built: 1910
- Architectural style: Bungalow/craftsman
- NRHP reference No.: 98001432
- Added to NRHP: November 23, 1998

The Mims-Breedlove-Priest-Weatherton House is a historic house at 2108 Beechwood Avenue in the Country Club Heights neighborhood of Little Rock, Arkansas. It is a 1 1/2-story wood-frame structure, finished in the Craftsman style. It has a side-gable roof with a shed-roof dormer, extending over its front porch, which is supported by square cypress box columns. Elements of the house framing are timbers salvaged from the demolition of the Gus Blass dry goods store. It was built about 1910 by H.T. Mims, supposedly as a wedding present for one of his twin daughters. (A nearly identical house, clad in vinyl siding, stands next door.) Houses of this sort were once typical in the neighborhood, which has seen many torn down and replaced with larger, more modern residences.

The house was listed on the National Register of Historic Places in 1998.

== See also ==
- National Register of Historic Places listings in Little Rock, Arkansas
