= Porter Motor Company =

Defunct American motor vehicle manufacturer

Porter Steam Stanhope
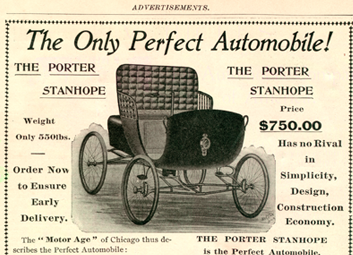
- detail from Porter Stanhope advertisement in Wide World Magazine

Overview
- Type: Steam car
- Manufacturer: Porter Motor Company
- Production: 1900–1901
- Designer: Major Dane Porter

Body and chassis
- Body style: Runabout

Powertrain
- Propulsion: steam engine

The Porter Motor Company was an early American steam automobile manufacturer based in Allston, Massachusetts.

Major Dane Porter (first name is Major) built the steam powered Porter Stanhope from 1900 to 1901 and advertised it as "The Only Perfect Automobile". Offices were located at 950 Tremont Building, Boston.

The Porter runabout featured an aluminium body and a weight of 550-lbs. It was capable of 25-mph, and was priced at $750, equivalent to $29,025 in 2025.

== See also ==
- VirtualSteamCarMuseum - Porter Motor Co.
- SteamCarNetwork - 1901 Porter Stanhope
