= Crocker (surname) =

Crocker, an archaic synonym of potter, is an occupational surname shared by:

== People ==
- Aimée Crocker (1864–1941), American mystic, bohemian, and author
- Albert Crocker (1882–1961), American inventor and entrepreneur
- Alvah Crocker (1801–1874), American politician
- Barbara Crocker (1910–1995), artist and author
- Barry Crocker (born 1935), Australian singer and actor
- Ben Crocker (born 1997), Australian former professional Australian rules footballer
- Ben Crocker (boxer) (born 1994), Welsh boxer
- Charles Crocker (1822–1888), American railroad tycoon
- Chester Crocker (born 1941), American diplomat
- Chris Crocker (Internet celebrity) (born 1987), American internet celebrity
- Ellen Crocker (1872–1962) British suffragette
- Erin Crocker (born 1981), American race car driver
- Eva Crocker, Canadian writer
- Fay Crocker (1914–1983), professional golfer
- Frankie Crocker (1937–2000), American radio personality
- Gary Crocker, Zimbabwean cricketer
- Gertrude Crocker (1884–1969), American suffragist
- Ginger Crocker, American politician
- Hans Crocker (1815–1889), American lawyer and politician
- Harold 'Mick' Crocker (1927–2014), Australian rugby league footballer
- Harry Crocker (1893–1958), American film actor
- Henry Radcliffe Crocker (1846–1909), English dermatologist
- Ian Crocker (born 1982), American Olympic swimming medalist
- Ian Crocker (commentator) (born 1965), British football radio commentator
- J. Howard Crocker (1870–1959), Canadian educator and sports executive
- John Crocker (disambiguation)
- Jonathan Crocker (1874–1944), English cricketer
- Laura Walker (curler) (born 1990), née Crocker, Canadian curler
- Lee Daniel Crocker (born 1963), American free software developer
- Marcellus M. Crocker (1830–1865), American Civil War Union Army general
- Michael Crocker (born 1980), Australian rugby league player
- Patricia Crocker (1929–1992), Australian actress, especially on radio
- Ryan Crocker (born 1949), American diplomat
- Samuel L. Crocker (1804–1883), American politician
- Sean Crocker (born 1996), American golfer
- Sewall K. Crocker (1883–1913), American automobile pioneer
- Steve Crocker (born 1944), American computer systems researcher
- Steve Crocker (politician), Canadian politician
- Susan Crocker (born 1940), American photographer
- Susan Elizabeth Wood Crocker (1836–1922), American physician
- Suzanne Crocker, Canadian documentary filmmaker
- Uriel Crocker (1796–1887), American railroad and publishing entrepreneur
- Walter Crocker (1902–2002), Australian diplomat
- Willard Crocker (1898 or 1900–1964), Canadian tennis player
- William H. Crocker (1861–1937), American entrepreneur
- Zebulon Crocker (1802–1847), American pastor
- Crocker family, a wealthy 19th-century American family, including Charles Crocker
- Crocker child murders, 21st-century American teenage murder victims

== Fictional characters ==
- Betty Crocker, in cooking advertisements
- Billy Crocker, in the Cole Porter musical Anything Goes
- Denzel Q. Crocker, in the animated television series The Fairly OddParents
- Duke Crocker, in the television series Haven
- Jane Crocker, in the webcomic Homestuck
- Manilow Crocker, in the American television series seaQuest DSV
- Roy Crocker, in the television series Haven
- Simon Crocker, in the television series Haven
