= Horatio's Drive: America's First Road Trip =

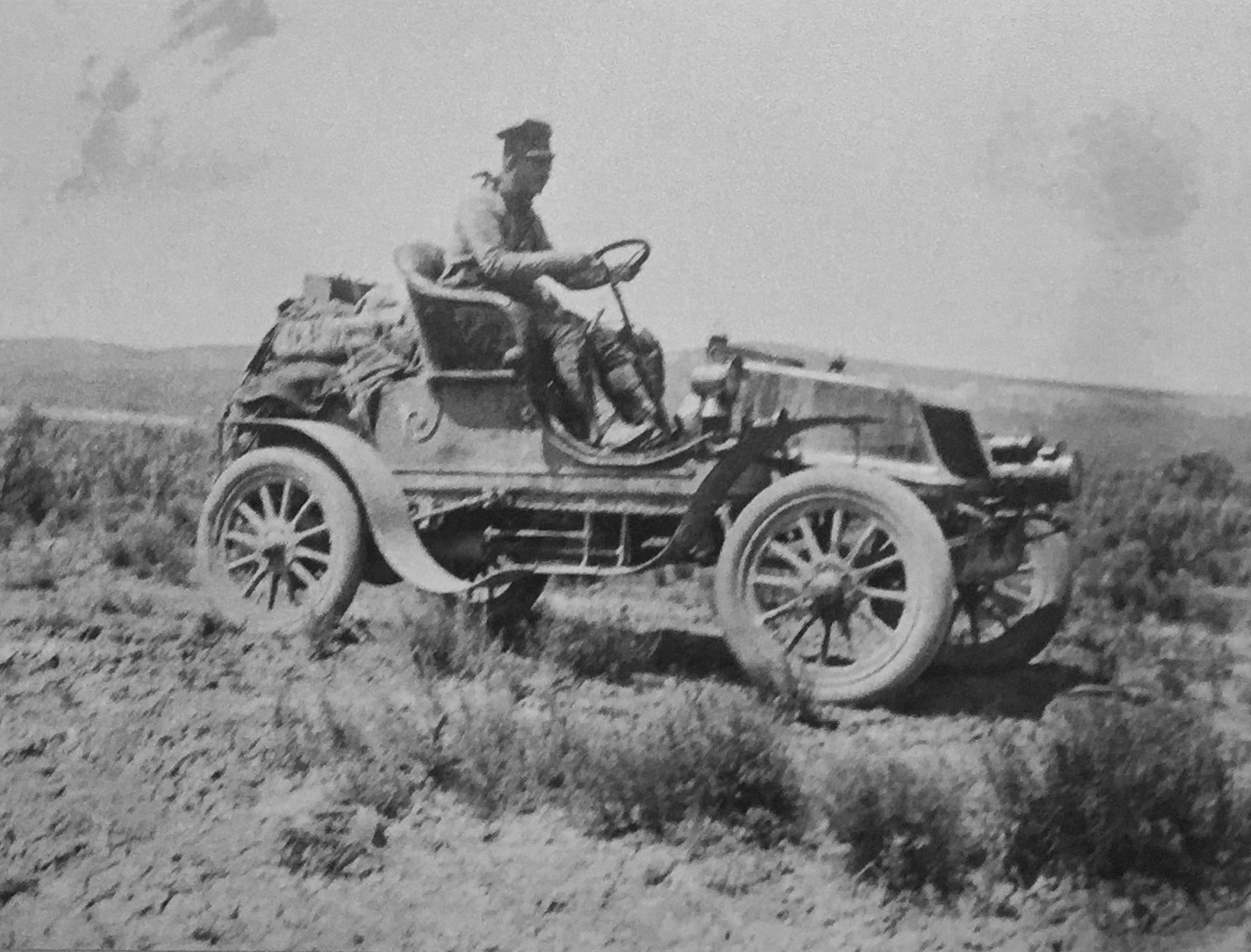
- Written by: Dayton Duncan
- Directed by: Ken Burns
- Country of origin: United States

Original release
- Release: October 6, 2003

Horatio's Drive: America's First Road Trip is a 2003 documentary film directed by Ken Burns and written by Dayton Duncan. Its subject is the first cross-country automobile journey in the United States, which occurred during the summer of 1903. The documentary focuses primarily on Horatio Nelson Jackson and his Winton car, the Vermont, along with his companions Sewall K. Crocker, his pet pitbull Bud and frequent correspondence with Jackson's wife Bertha Richardson Wells (called "Swipes" by Jackson). The journey became a race among three teams, the winners being Jackson and Crocker.

The documentary has a companion book and audiobook, Horatio's Drive: America's First Road Trip, authored by Dayton Duncan and Ken Burns, published by Knopf in 2003. Four decades prior, the story was the subject of Ralph Nading Hill's 1964 book The Mad Doctor's Drive.

== Actors and historians ==
Several noted actors read the lines of various historical figures. They include:

- Keith David - Narrator
- Tom Hanks - Horatio Nelson Jackson
- Adam Arkin
- Tom Bodett
- Philip Bosco
- Kevin Conway
- John Cullum
- Murphy Guyer
- Amy Madigan
- George Plimpton
- Eli Wallach

Archival footage of Horatio Nelson Jackson is included.

A series of American university professors of history provided background information.

== Music ==
The soundtrack includes a variety of music, including some bluegrass instrumentals and a modern rendition by Bobby Horton of an old song called "He'd Have to Get Under – Get Out and Get Under (to Fix Up His Automobile)".
