= John Croker =

John Croker is the name of:

- John Croker (engraver) (1670–1741), earlier Johann Crocker, German-born engraver who worked mostly in Great Britain
- John Croker (politician) (1680–1751), Irish politician
- John Wilson Croker (1780–1857), Irish politician and author

== See also ==
- John Coker (disambiguation)
- John Crocker (disambiguation)
- John Croke (disambiguation)
