= Bud (dog) =

Early-20th-century bulldog

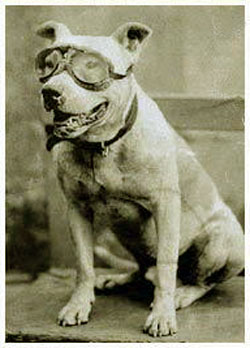
- Bud wearing goggles

Bud, a bulldog (or American Bulldog), was the mascot of Horatio Nelson Jackson and Sewall K. Crocker on the first automobile trip across the United States in 1903. The pair travelled in a Winton car, dubbed the Vermont, from San Francisco to New York City, and picked up Bud near Caldwell, Idaho.

According to Jackson, the pair had left Caldwell, but turned back to fetch a forgotten coat. A man stopped them and offered them the young light-colored dog. Since Jackson had been looking for a mascot, he accepted, giving the man $15 for the dog. Contemporary newspapers told other versions of the story. On the journey, Jackson purchased driving goggles for Bud to keep the dust out of his eyes. In 1944, Jackson donated Bud's goggles, his car and newspaper clips to the Smithsonian Institution. The National Museum of American History has the items on display in their America on the Move exhibit, including replicas of Jackson standing by his car, and Bud sitting ahead of him wearing goggles.

The trio, including Bud, became celebrities, and Bud was pictured in newspapers with his goggles. Jackson noted that the dog was the only one of the trio who didn't use foul language. At one point during the journey, when the men hadn't eaten for 36 hours, Jackson said they were "stealing speculative glances at Bud as we tightened our belts." Bud briefly went missing when the party was leaving Chicago; according to one newspaper, he had gone sightseeing.

Bud stayed with Jackson and his family, and lived out his life with them. The dog appears in media such as Horatio's Drive: America's First Road Trip, a 2003 documentary, and the children's book Jackson and Bud's Bumpy Ride: America's First Cross-Country Automobile Trip (2009).

== See also ==
- List of individual dogs
