= Horatio Jackson =

Horatio Jackson may refer to:

- Horatio Nelson Jackson (1872–1955), American physician and automobile pioneer
- Thomas Horatio Jackson (1879–1935), Nigerian newspaper editor and publisher
