= Horatio Nelson Jackson =

American automobile pioneer (1872–1955)

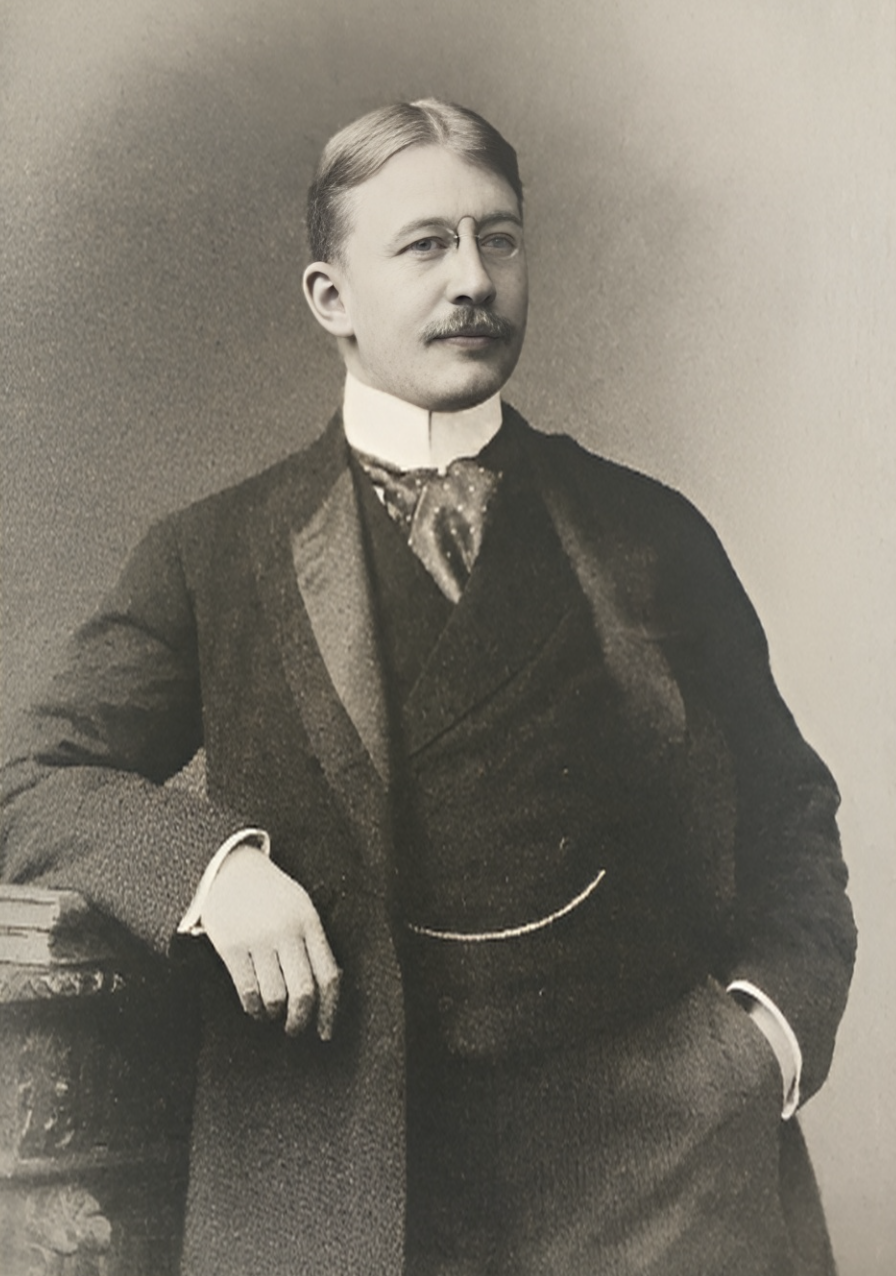
- Jackson, c. 1913

Personal details
- Born: March 25, 1872 Toronto, Canada
- Died: January 14, 1955 (aged 82) Burlington, Vermont, U.S.
- Resting place: Lakeview Cemetery, Burlington, Vermont, U.S.
- Spouse: Bertha Richardson Wells (m. 1899 d. 1954)
- Relations: William Wells (father in law); Hollister Jackson (brother); John Holmes Jackson (brother)
- Education: University of Vermont
- Occupation: Physician, businessman
- Known for: first U.S. cross country trip by automobile

Military service
- Branch: United States Army
- Years of service: 1917–1919
- Rank: Colonel
- Unit: Medical Corps
- Battles: World War I; Meuse–Argonne (WIA); Defensive Sector
- Awards: Distinguished Service Cross; Legion of Honor (France); Croix de Guerre with Palm (France)

Horatio Nelson Jackson (March 25, 1872 – January 14, 1955) was a Canadian-American physician, Army medical officer, businessman, and automobile pioneer. In 1903, he and his hired mechanic and driving partner Sewall K. Crocker became the first people to drive an automobile across the United States, a road trip from San Francisco to New York City, with additional miles travelled to his home in Vermont.

Jackson served in World War I and was a key organizer of the American Legion, where he held the position of Vice Commander. He was also the owner of the Burlington Daily News, president of the Burlington Trust Bank, and owner of the first local radio station WCAX. He was nicknamed "The Mad Doctor."

== Early life and medical career ==
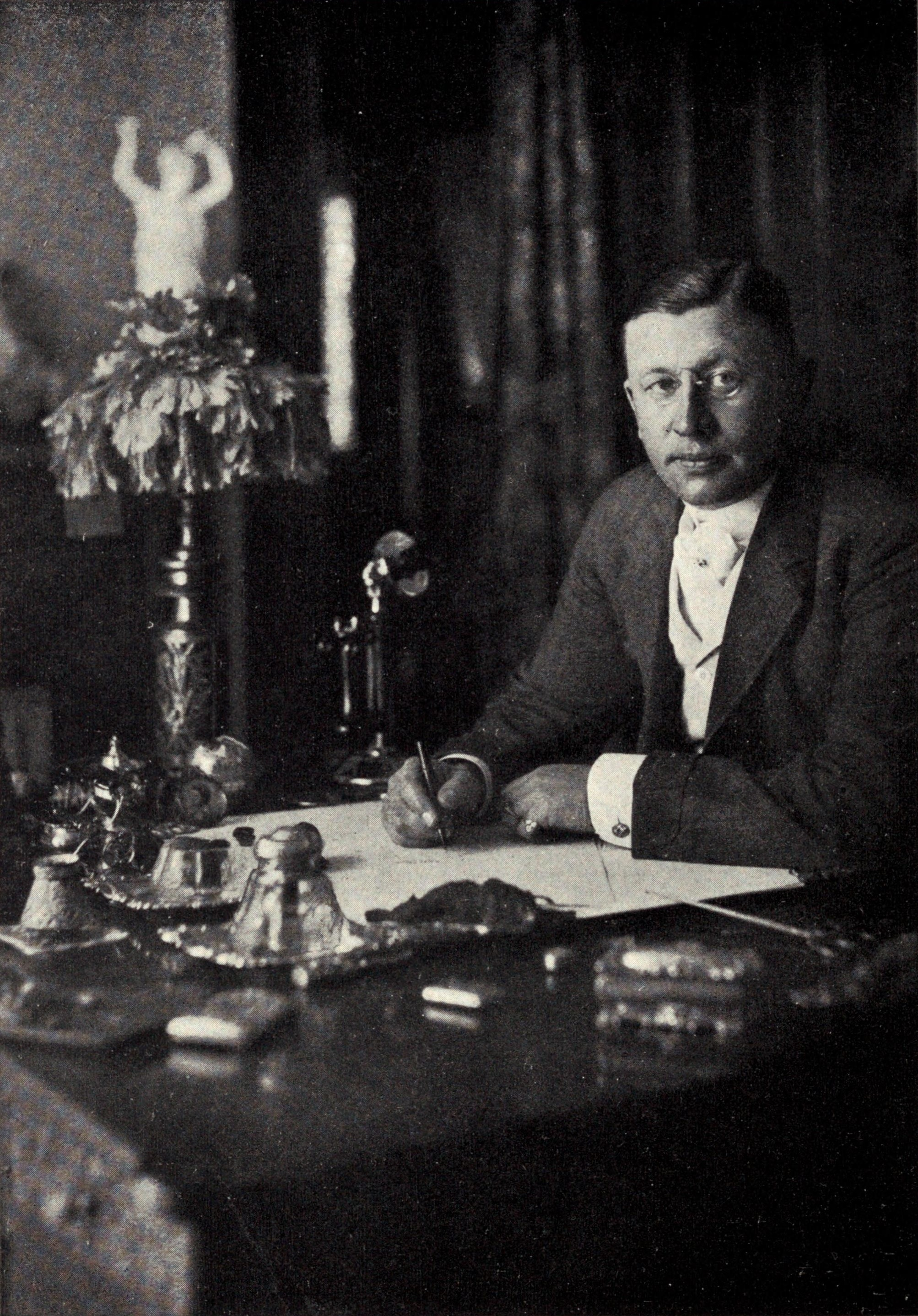
H. Nelson Jackson as a physician in Vermont

Jackson was born in Toronto, Ontario, Canada, on March 25, 1872, a son of Samuel Nelson Jackson (1838–1913) and Mary Anne (Parkyn) Jackson (1843–1916). His siblings included J. Holmes Jackson, who served several terms as mayor of Burlington, Vermont and S. Hollister Jackson, who served as Lieutenant governor of Vermont until his death in the great Vermont flood of 1927. Horatio N. Jackson also maintained a close lifelong relationship with his cousin, Dr. Herbert A. Parkyn, who was the founder of The Chicago School of Psychology.

Jackson attended the schools of Toronto and Toronto's collegiate institute. He graduated with an MD degree from the University of Vermont in 1893, and became the House Surgeon in the Mary Fletcher Hospital until 1895 when he became a physician at the Brattleboro Retreat also known as the Vermont Asylum for the Insane. He then practiced private medicine in Burlington until 1900, when health issues led him to retire from active medical work.

== Cross-country drive ==
=== Wager and preparations ===
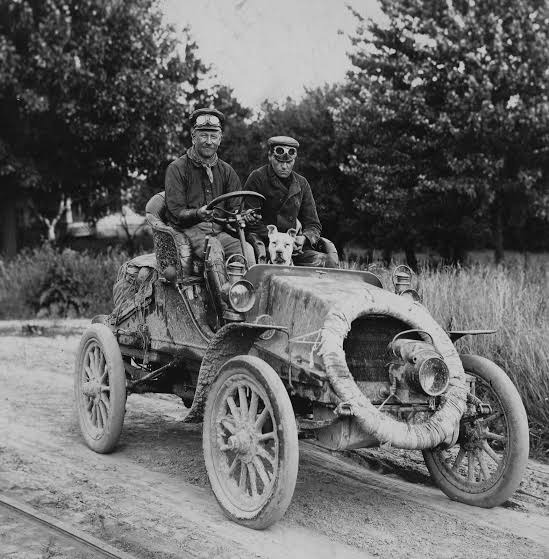
Horatio Nelson Jackson and Sewall K. Crocker, along with Bud, in the first automobile that made it across the U.S.

Besides his medical practice, Jackson was an auto enthusiast who differed with the then-prevailing wisdom that the automobile was a passing fad and a recreational plaything. While in San Francisco's University Club as a guest on May 18, 1903, he agreed to a $50 wager (equivalent to $1,792 in 2025) to prove that a four-wheeled machine could be driven across the country in less than 90 days. He accepted, even though at age 31 he did not own a car, had practically no experience driving, and had no maps to follow. Jackson and his wife planned to return to their Burlington, Vermont, home in a few days, and both had been taking automobile driving lessons while in San Francisco. She returned home by train, allowing him to take his adventure by automobile.

Having no mechanical experience, Jackson convinced a young mechanic and chauffeur, Sewall K. Crocker, to serve as his travel companion, mechanic, and backup driver. Crocker suggested that Jackson buy a Winton car. He bought a slightly used, two-cylinder, 20 hp Winton, which he named the Vermont, after his home state, bade his wife goodbye, and left San Francisco on May 23, carrying coats, rubber protective suits, sleeping bags, blankets, canteens, a water bag, an axe, a shovel, a telescope, tools, spare parts, a block and tackle, cans for extra gasoline and oil, a Kodak camera, a rifle, a shotgun, and pistols.

Heeding the failed attempt by automobile pioneer Alexander Winton (founder of the Winton Motor Carriage Company, which manufactured Jackson's car) to cross the deserts of Nevada and Utah, Jackson decided to take a more northerly route through the Sacramento Valley and along the Oregon Trail. This allowed them to avoid the higher passes in the Sierra Nevada and Rocky Mountains.

=== Journey ===
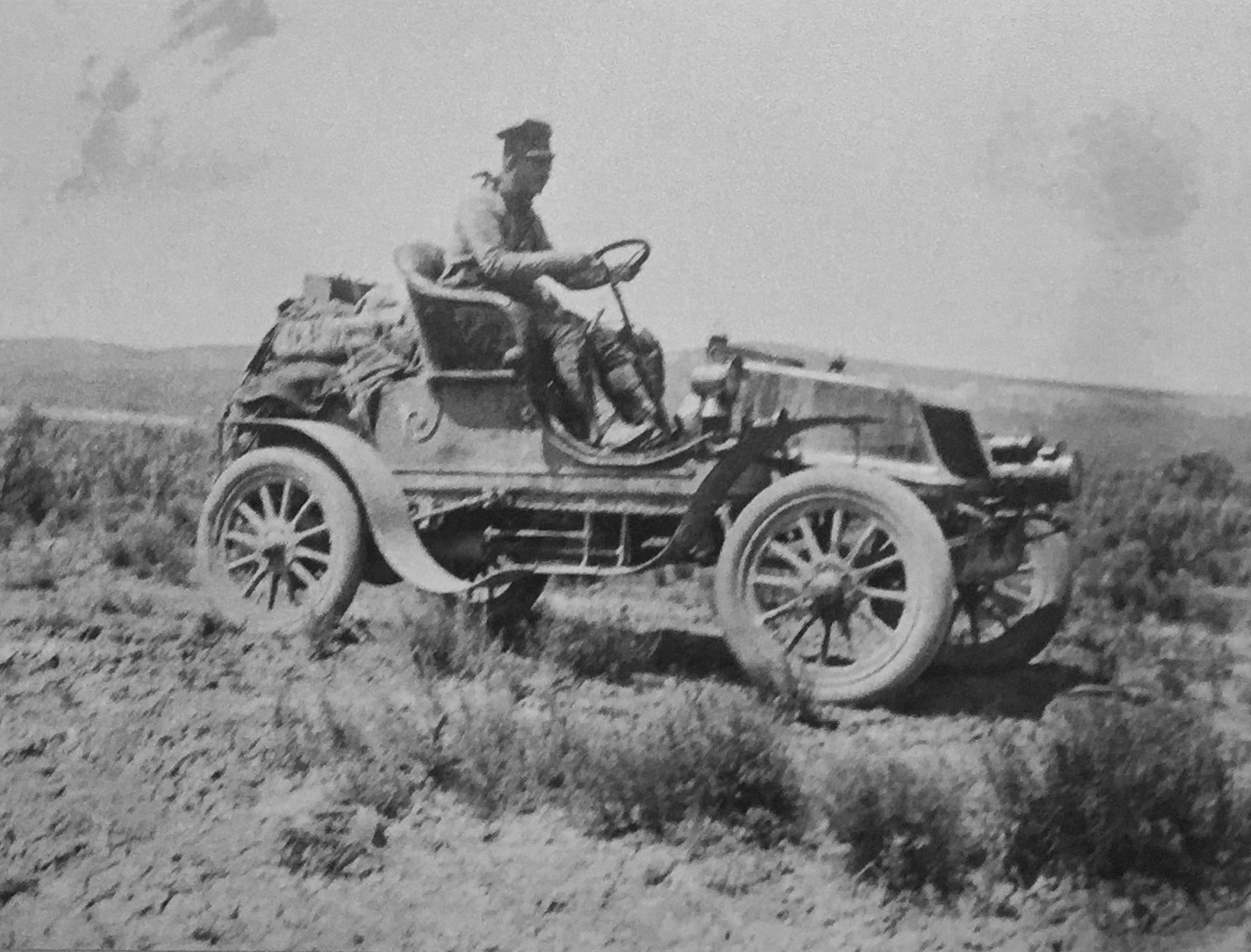
Jackson driving the Vermont on the 1903 cross-country drive

On May 23, 1903, the car was transported by ferry from San Francisco to Oakland and pointed eastward. But only 15 miles (24 km) into the journey, the car blew a tire. Jackson and Crocker replaced it with the only spare they had, in fact, the only right-sized spare tire they could find in all of San Francisco.

On the first night of the journey they discovered that the side lanterns were too dim. On the second night, they stopped early in Sacramento and replaced them with a large spotlight mounted on the front of the Vermont. The duo was also assisted in Sacramento by bicyclists who offered them road maps. Jackson was unable to buy a new tire, but purchased some used inner tubes.

Going northwards out of Sacramento, the noise of the car covered the fact that the duo's cooking gear was falling off. They were also given a 108-mile (174 km) misdirection by a woman so that she could send them to the spot where her family could see an automobile.

The rough trek towards Oregon required them to haul the car across deep streams with the block and tackle. Somewhere along this route, Jackson lost a pair of his glasses. Items continued to be lost, including another pair of Jackson's glasses. They were also forced to pay a $4 (equivalent to $143 in 2025) toll by a land-owner in order to cross his property on a "bad, rocky, mountain road" as Jackson described it. When their tires blew out they were required to wind rope around the wheels. Jackson did manage to find a telegraph office and wired back to San Francisco for replacement tires to be transported to them along the journey.

Reaching Alturas, California, Jackson and Crocker stopped to wait for the tires. They offered locals rides in the car in exchange for a "wild west show". When the tires failed to materialize, however, they continued on after a three-day wait.

On June 6, the car broke down, and they had to be towed to a nearby ranch by a cowboy on horseback. Crocker made repairs, but a fuel leak caused them to lose all of their available gasoline, and Jackson rented a bicycle for Crocker to travel 25 miles (40 km) to Burns, Oregon, for fuel. After suffering a flat tire on the bicycle, he returned with 4 US gallons (15 L) of fuel (which Jackson complained cost him "nearly twenty dollars"), and they returned to Burns to fill up.

On June 9, outside of Vale, Oregon, the Vermont ran out of oil. Jackson walked back to the last town to get oil, only to discover eventually that they had been stopped only a short distance outside of Vale. The next day they arrived in Ontario, Oregon, where supplies waited for them.

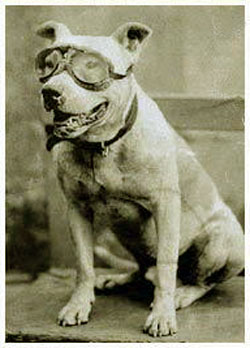
Bud

Somewhere near Caldwell, Idaho, Jackson and Crocker obtained a dog, a bulldog named Bud. Jackson had wanted a dog companion since Sacramento. Newspapers at the time gave a variety of stories of how Bud was acquired, including that he was stolen; in a letter to his wife, Nelson said a man sold him the dog for $15 (equivalent to $537 in 2025). It turned out that the dusty alkali flats the travelers encountered would bother Bud's eyes so much (the Vermont had neither a roof nor windshield) that Jackson eventually fitted him with a pair of goggles. At one point, Bud drank bad water and became ill, but survived.

At this point, the trio became celebrities. The press came out at every stop to take their picture and conduct interviews. At Mountain Home, Idaho, citizens warned them that the Oregon Trail was not good further east, so Jackson and Crocker veered off their original course along the southern edge of the Sawtooth Mountains. At Hailey, Idaho, Crocker wired the Winton Company for more parts.

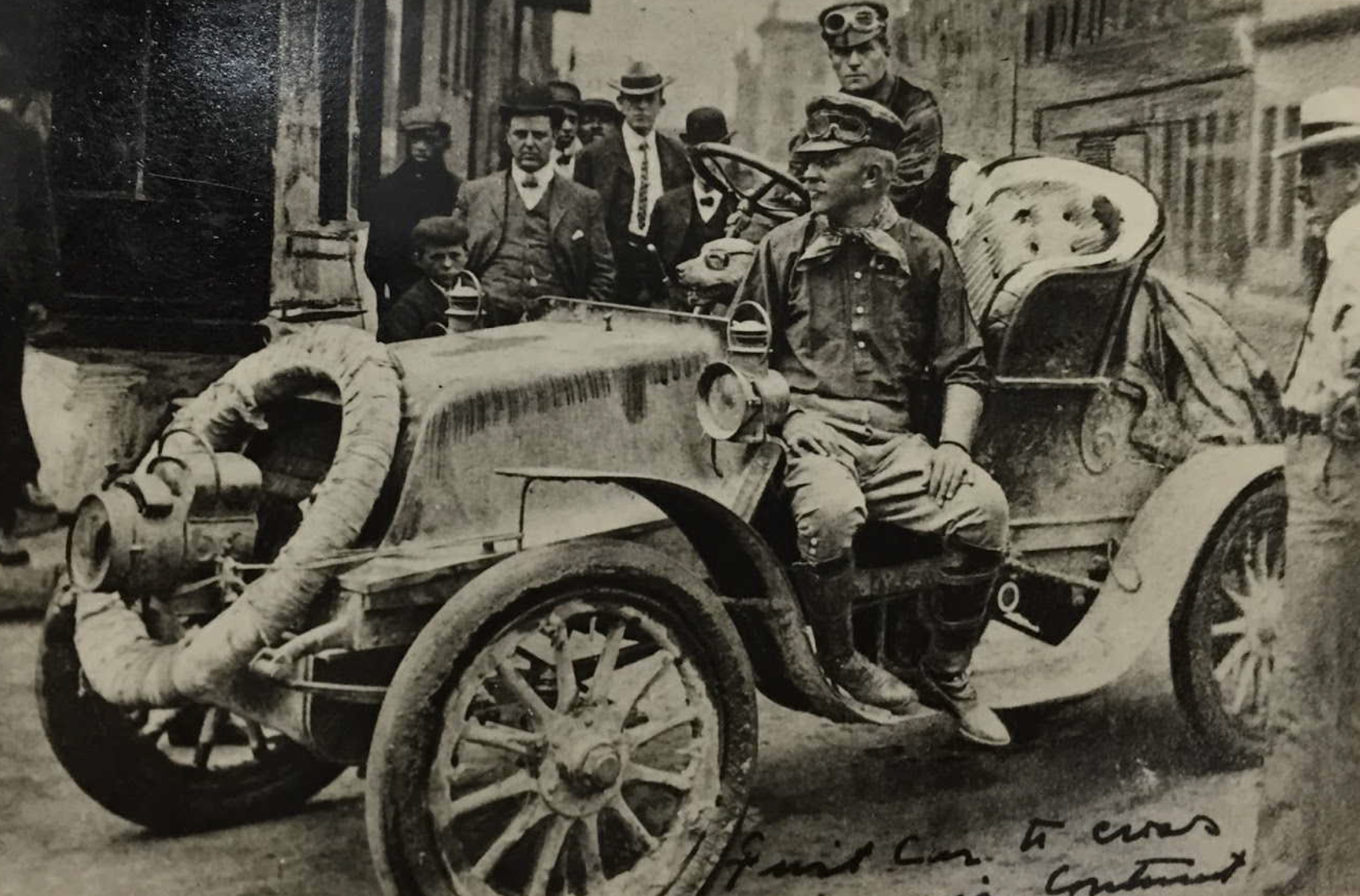
H. Nelson Jackson on his drive

On June 16, somewhere in Idaho, Jackson's coat, containing most of the travelers' money, fell off and was not found. At their next stop, Jackson had to wire his wife to send them money to Cheyenne, Wyoming. Between June 20 and 21, all three of them got lost in Wyoming, and went without food for 36 hours before finding a sheepherder who gave them a meal of roast lamb and boiled corn. Before reaching Cheyenne, however, the car's wheel bearings gave out, and Crocker had to talk a farmer into letting them have the wheel bearings of his mowing machine.

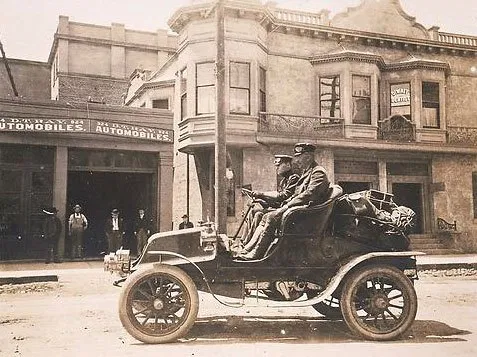
H. Nelson Jackson and Sewall K. Crocker in 1903

The travelers eventually reached Omaha, Nebraska, on July 12. From there on, they were able to use a few paved roads, and their trip was much easier. In Chicago, Jackson was met by his cousin, Dr. Herbert A. Parkyn, and he was able to have a visit with family and friends. The only mishap happened just east of Buffalo, New York, when the Vermont ran into a hidden obstacle in the road and Jackson, Crocker, and Bud were thrown from the car. They arrived in New York City on July 26, 1903, 63 days, 12 hours, and 30 minutes after commencing their journey in San Francisco, in the first automobile to successfully transit the North American continent. Their trip expended over 800 US gallons (3,000 L) of gasoline.

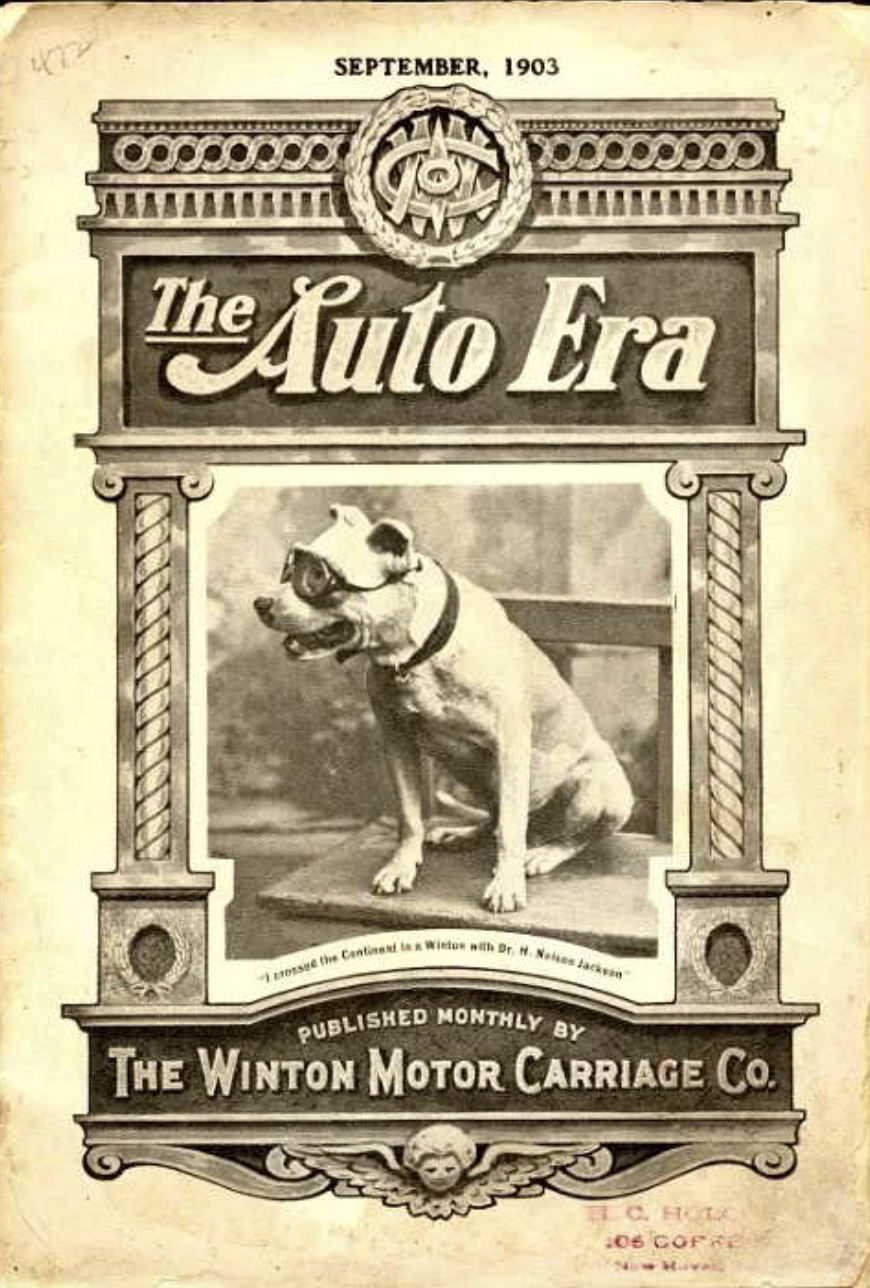
Bud the dog became an instant celebrity and was used in many advertisements.

After leaving New York City, Jackson joined his wife and drove home to Vermont. About 15 miles (24 km) from home, his car, once again, broke down. His two brothers, each driving his own automobile, came to help him get going again. Shortly after returning to the road, both of the brothers' vehicles broke down, and Jackson towed them both home with the Vermont. Upon reaching the threshold of Jackson's garage, the Vermont's drive chain snapped. It was one of the few original parts never replaced during the entire journey.

== Business career ==
Jackson continued to reside in Burlington, Vermont, with his wife Bertha and Bud the dog. He was active in several businesses, including a granite manufacturing company co-owned with his brother S. Hollister Jackson.

== Awards and decorations ==
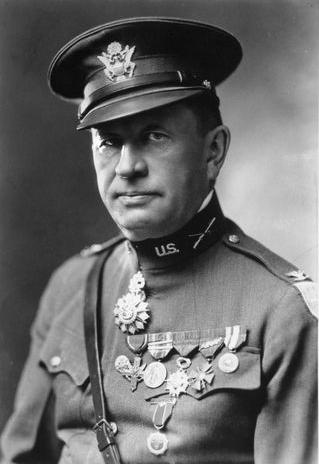
Jackson in uniform after World War I (c. 1923)

Jackson's military awards included the Distinguished Service Cross, the Legion of Honour, and the Croix de Guerre.

=== Distinguished Service Cross citation ===
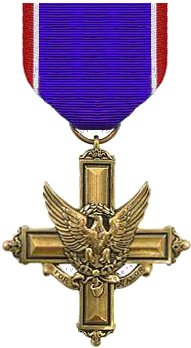

The President of the United States of America, authorized by Act of Congress, July 9, 1918, takes pleasure in presenting the Distinguished Service Cross to Major (Medical Corps) Horatio N. Jackson, United States Army, for extraordinary heroism in action while serving with 313th Infantry Regiment (attached), 79th Division, A. E. F., near Montfaucon, France, September 26–29, 1918. Constantly working in the face of heavy machine-gun and shell fire, Major Jackson was most devoted in his attention to the wounded, always present in the line of advance, directing the administering of first aid, and guiding the work of litter bearers. He remained on duty until severely wounded by high-explosive shells, when he was obliged to evacuate.

== Later life ==
Jackson served as a senior officer in the Officer Reserve Corps. He twice ran unsuccessfully for Governor of Vermont. In addition to owning and publishing the Burlington Daily News, he was head of the Burlington Trust Company, and owned and operated radio station WCAX (now WVMT). At one point he was ticketed for exceeding the 6 mph (9.7 km/h) speed limit in Burlington.

Jackson died on January 14, 1955, in Burlington, Vermont, and was buried in the Lakeview Cemetery there.

== The Vermont ==
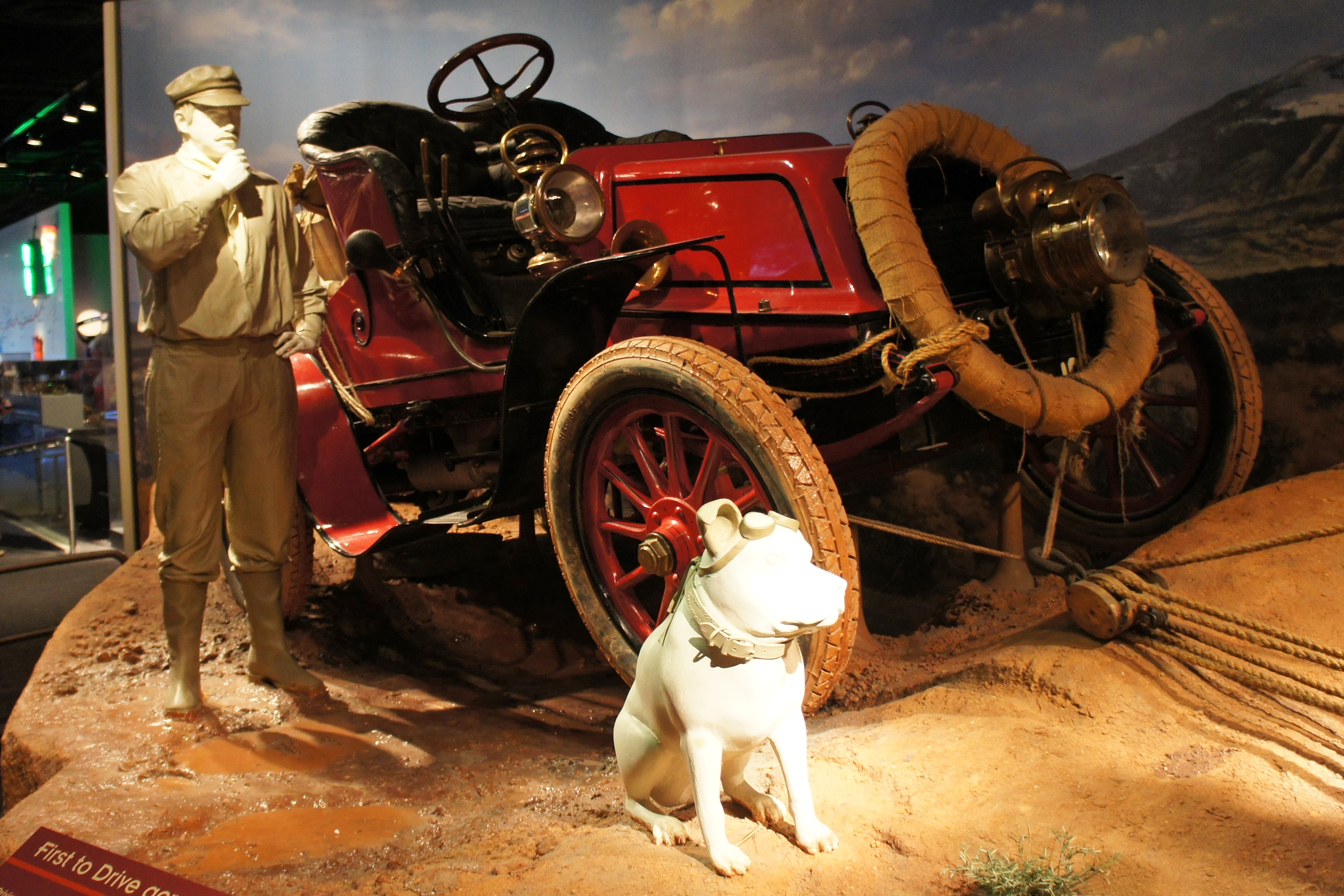
Exhibit at the National Museum of American History recreating H. Nelson Jackson's first successful North American transcontinental automobile trip in a 1903 Winton touring car, the Vermont

In 1944, Jackson gave his Winton, the Vermont, to the Smithsonian Institution in Washington, D.C., where it is preserved at the National Museum of American History.

== In popular culture ==
Documentary film maker Ken Burns produced a film, Horatio's Drive, for PBS. The film is accompanied by a book of the same name written by Burns and Dayton Duncan. Tom Hanks provided the voice-over narration for Horatio Nelson Jackson. The film features many old songs, framed by a popular number from 1914 called "He'd Have to Get Under – Get Out and Get Under (to Fix Up His Automobile)". The video game Red Dead Redemption 2 by Rockstar Games features a newspaper with a similar story about a man who traveled across the country in a car, though the names are changed.

Four decades prior, Jackson's transcontinental automobile journey was the subject of Ralph Nading Hill's 1964 book The Mad Doctor's Drive.

== Personal life ==
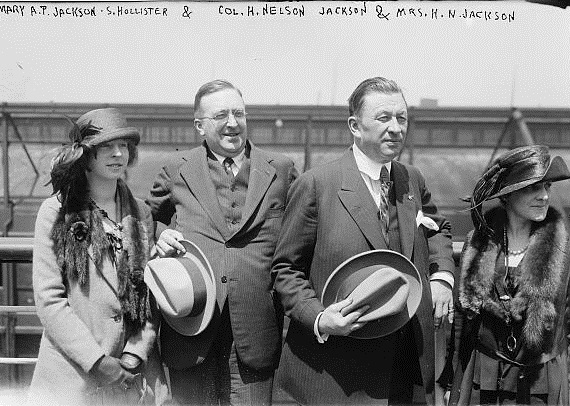
H. Nelson and Bertha (Wells) Jackson with Jackson's brother Lt. Gov. S. Hollister Jackson, and Mary Ann Parkyn Jackson (1903–1935), the daughter of Joseph Addison Jackson, that he and Bertha adopted. 1922

He married Bertha Richardson Wells, the daughter of William Wells, a Medal of Honor recipient and one of the richest men in Vermont as a partner in Wells, Richardson & Co., manufacturer of Paine's Celery Compound, a popular patent medicine. H. Nelson Jackson and Bertha Wells did not have children but formally adopted the two young daughters of Jackson’s brother, Joseph Addison Jackson, who died at a young age. Their adopted daughters were Mary Ann Parkyn Jackson (1903–1935) and Bertha Wells Jackson (1906–1984). Mary Ann Jackson married William Reineman Forbes a graduate of the United States Military Academy class of 1924. She died during childbirth a year after the marriage. Bertha Wells Jackson married George B. Kolk, who served as an editor at Horatio's Burlington Daily News and also active in the American Legion.

H. Nelson Jackson and Bertha would also serve as the unofficial adoptive parents to the two sons of another brother, Lieutenant Governor S. Hollister Jackson, who died in the Great Vermont Flood of 1927. His nephews, Nelson P. Jackson, a 1933 graduate of USMA, and Samuel H. Jackson II, would both serve as colonels in the United States Air Force.

== See also ==
- List of members of the American Legion
- List of people from Vermont
- List of University of Vermont people
