= John Coker =

John Coker may refer to:

- John "Jack" Coker (soldier) (1789–1861), soldier in the Texas Army during the Texas Revolution
- John Coker (clergyman) (died 1631/35), Anglican clergyman and misidentified author
- John Coker (basketball) (born 1971), American basketball player
- John Coker (boxer) (born 1940), Sierra Leonean boxer
- John Coker (cricketer) (1821–1901), English cricketer and clergyman
