= Sewall K. Crocker =

American cyclist (1883–1913)

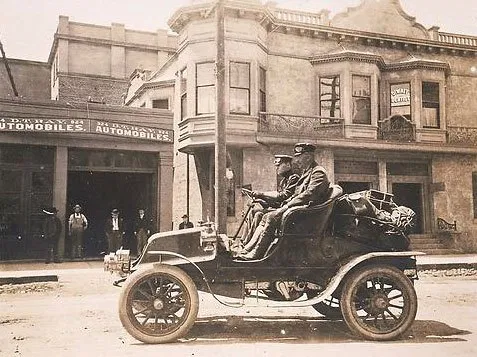
- Sewall K. Crocker, as driver in Winton vehicle in 1903
- Born: April 7, 1883; Walla Walla, Washington, US
- Died: April 22, 1913 (aged 30); Tacoma, Washington, US
- Occupations: Bicycle Racer; Automobile Pioneer

Sewall K. Crocker (April 7, 1883 – April 22, 1913) was an American bicycle racer and automobile pioneer from Tacoma, Washington, who became the mechanic and co-driver who partnered with Horatio Nelson Jackson in the first successful cross-country automobile trip in 1903.

Crocker was born in Walla Walla, Washington on April 7, 1883. In addition to giving Jackson driving lessons, he also may have convinced Jackson to use a Winton vehicle for the trip. Jackson purchased a two-cylinder, 20-horsepower Winton motor car that he dubbed the Vermont for the journey, which was conceived following a $50 wager to prove that a four-wheeled machine could be driven across the country. The drive from coast to coast was financed by Jackson, ultimately costing $8,000 (adjusted to 2022 dollars, approximately $260,000).

Crocker and Jackson departed San Francisco, California on May 23, 1903, and drove to New York City in about 63 days, arriving on July 26. They never collected the $50 wager. Crocker was primarily responsible for making the necessary repairs of the vehicle during the trip, which broke down frequently, especially on the harsh, unpaved roads of the West. The two men, along with Jackson's dog Bud, quickly became national celebrities.

After the race, Crocker attempted to capitalize on his fame by seeking sponsors for a round-the-world auto tour, but it never materialized. In 1913, his health failing, he died at the young age of 30 in his home state of Washington.

His collaboration with Jackson was the subject of Ralph Nading Hill's 1964 book The Mad Doctor's Drive. The story was retold four decades later in the 2003 documentary film Horatio's Drive: America's First Road Trip and its companion book co-written by Dayton Duncan and Ken Burns.
