= Thomas Gerard (historian) =

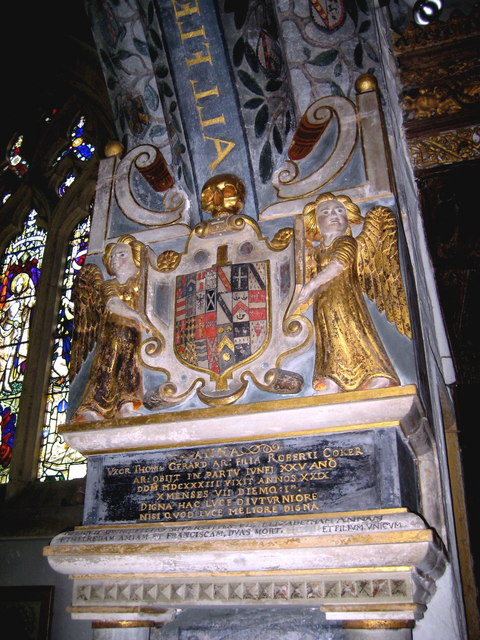
Thomas Gerard's memorial to his wife, St Andrew's Church, Trent, Dorset

Thomas Gerard (1593–1634), lord of the manor of Trent in Somerset (now in Dorset), was an antiquary and historian of the county of Dorset and is the author of "Coker's" Survey of Dorsetshire.

== Career ==
He was born at Trent, in Somerset, in 1593 and was educated at Gloucester Hall, Oxford.

=== Country historian ===
He was the first "county historian" of Dorset, but his work has traditionally been attributed to the clergyman John Coker, hence known as "Coker's Survey of Dorsetshire". He thus joined other "county historians" who made an appearance during his era, such as Sir William Pole (d.1635) and Tristram Risdon (d.1640) of Devon, William Burton (d.1645) of Leicestershire (a friend of his), etc., and most notably William Camden (d.1623).

=== Publications ===
- "Coker's" Survey of Dorsetshire, Containing the Antiquities and Natural History of that County, published posthumously in 1732. It was relied on heavily by John Hutchins for his History and Antiquities of the County of Dorset.
- Particular Description of Somerset, unfinished work.

== Marriage and children ==
In 1618 he married Ann Coker (1603-1633), a daughter of Robert Coker of Mappowder in Dorset. She died in childbirth on 25 June 1633, aged 29 years, 10 months and 7 days, as her monument in St Andrew's Church, Trent states. By Ann he had children including:

- Ann Gerard, who in 1646 married Col. Sir Francis Wyndham, 1st Baronet (c.1612-1676), of the prominent Wyndham family of Orchard Wyndham in Somerset, a colonel of horse in the Royalist army during the Civil War who helped the future King Charles II to escape to France. In 1651 Charles was given refuge at the manor house of Trent, on his way to the port of Bridport in Dorset and thence to exile in France.

== Sources ==
- Thomas Gerard of Trent, 2011 article, Dorset Ancestors website
