= Ticonderoga (steamboat) =

Steamboat

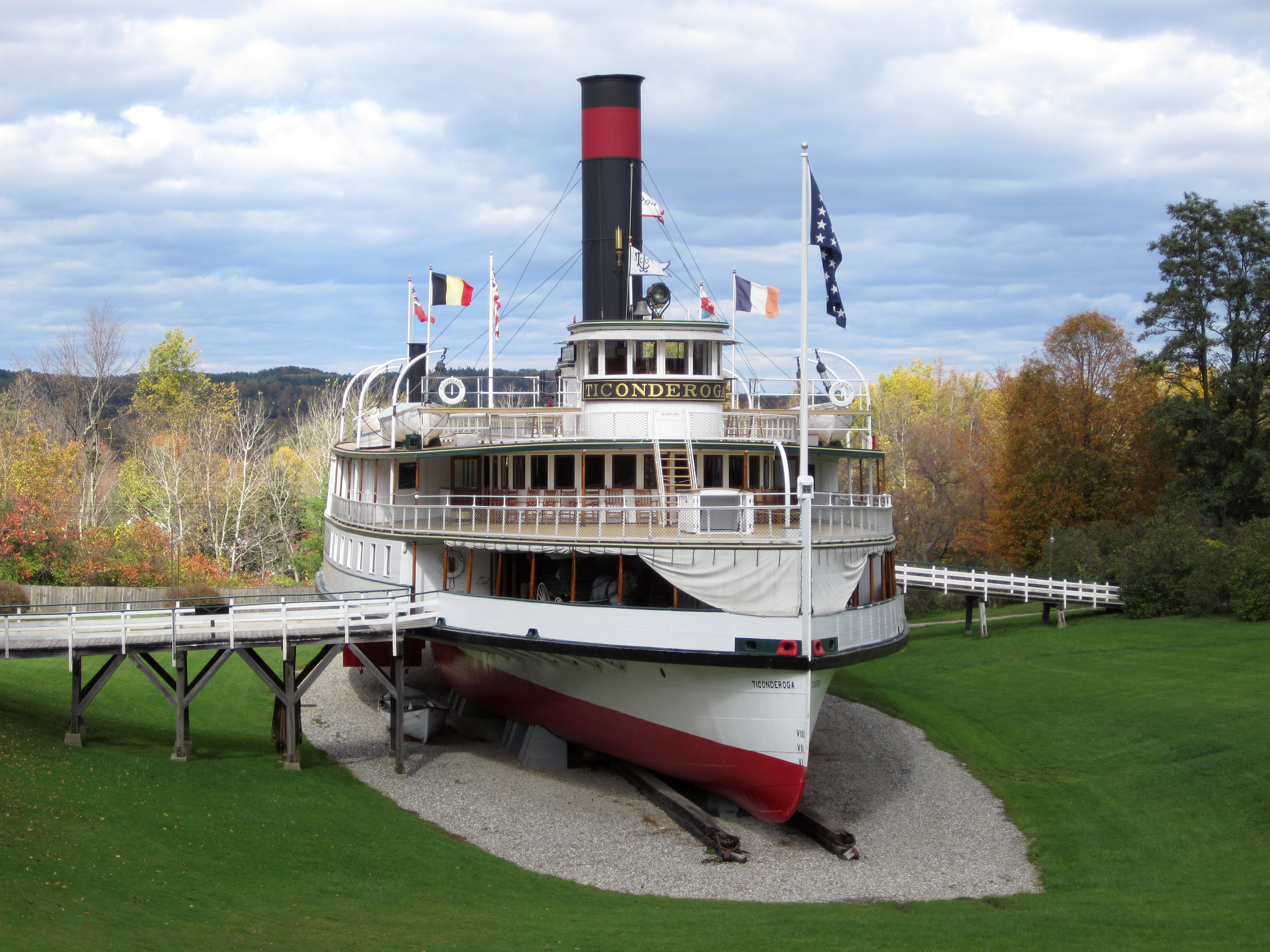
- Ticonderoga at Shelburne Museum, Vermont, 2011

History

United States
- Name: Ticonderoga
- Owner: Champlain Transportation Company
- Builder: Shelburne Shipyard
- Launched: 1906
- Out of service: 1950
- Status: Museum ship

General characteristics
- Displacement: 892 tons
- Length: 220 ft (67 m)
- Beam: 59 ft (18 m)
- Installed power: 2 × coal-fired boilers
- Propulsion: Vertical beam steam engine, side-paddle-wheel
- Speed: 17 mph (27 km/h) (14.77 knots)
- Crew: 28
- Ticonderoga (Side-paddle-wheel Lakeboat)
- U.S. National Register of Historic Places
- U.S. National Historic Landmark
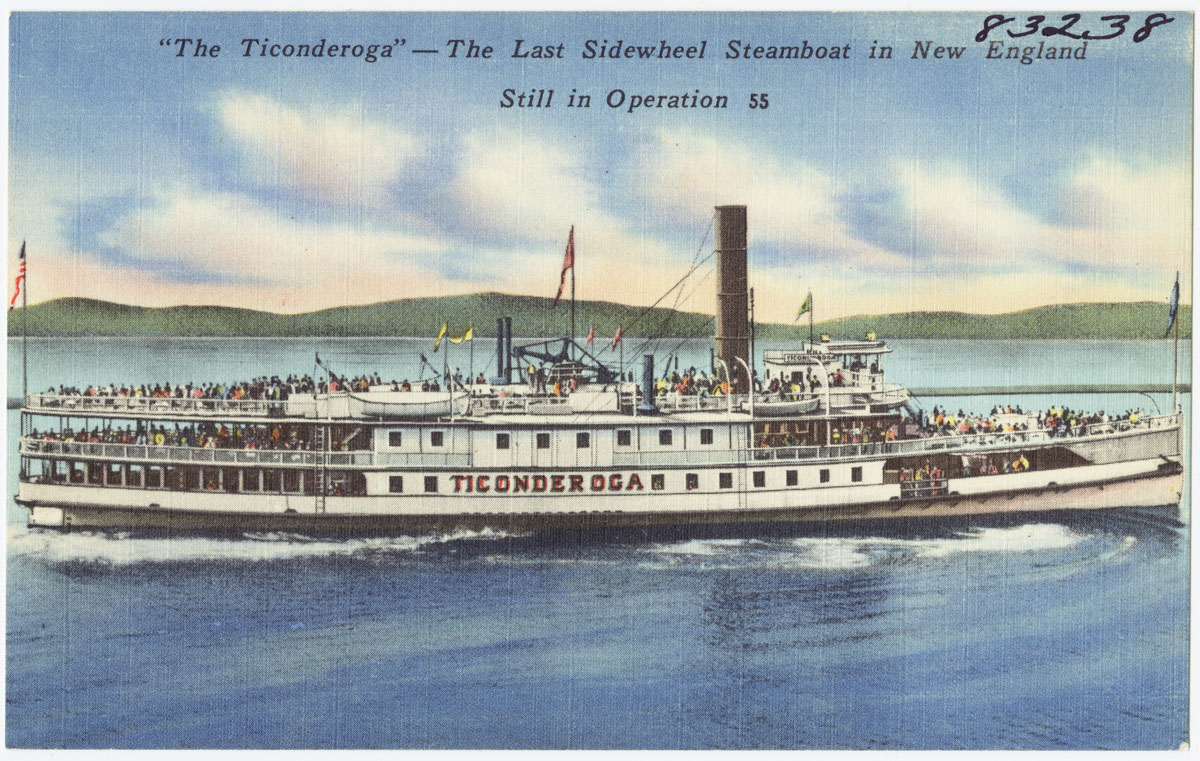
- Postcard showing Ticonderoga

- Location within Vermont
- Location: Shelburne, Vermont
- Coordinates: 44°22′31.6″N 73°13′56.4″W
- Built: 1906
- Architect: Champlain Transportation Company
- NRHP reference No.: 66000797

Significant dates
- Added to NRHP: 15 October 1966
- Designated NHL: 28 January 1964

Ticonderoga is a museum ship and one of just two (Note: The other is the large ferryboat Eureka, built as the Ukiah, which ended service in 1958 and was eventually donated for museum display, where she remains to this day at Aquatic Park in San Francisco, California.) remaining sidewheel passenger steamers with an intact walking beam engine of the type that powered countless thousands of American freight and passenger vessels on America's bays, lakes and rivers for more than a century. Commissioned by the Champlain Transportation Company, Ticonderoga was built in 1906 at the Shelburne Shipyard in Shelburne, Vermont on Lake Champlain.

Ticonderoga measures 220 feet in length and 59 feet in beam, with a displacement of 892 tons. Her steam engine, built by the Fletcher Engine Company of Hoboken, New Jersey, was powered by two coal-fired boilers and could achieve a maximum speed of 17 miles per hour (27 km/h) (14.77 knots).

== History ==
The ship's crew numbered twenty-eight, including the captain, pilots, mate, deckhands, engineers, and firemen to operate the boat. The purser, stewardess, freight clerk, bartender, hall boys, cook, waiters, scullion, and mess boys attended to passengers and freight arrangements.

Initially, Ticonderoga served a north–south route on Lake Champlain. Daily, she docked at Westport, New York, where she met the New York City evening train. The next morning she carried travelers and freight northward to St. Albans, Vermont. In addition to passengers, Ticonderoga transported local farm produce, livestock, and dry goods on a regular basis, and during both world wars ferried U.S. troops between Plattsburgh, New York and Burlington, Vermont. Over the years she also operated on the east–west run from Burlington to Port Kent, New York and had a brief career as a floating casino.

When more modern ferries made her obsolete, Ticonderoga managed to persist in operation as an excursion boat for several years; however, by 1950 the steady decline in business threatened her future. Ralph Nading Hill saved Ticonderoga from the scrap heap when he persuaded Electra Havemeyer Webb to buy her for her growing museum. While the Shelburne Museum attempted to keep her in operation, the steamboat era had passed making it difficult to find qualified personnel to operate and maintain the aging vessel.

== Relocation ==
In 1954 the Shelburne Museum decided to move Ticonderoga overland to the museum grounds. At the end of the summer season the boat paddled into a newly dug, water-filled basin off Shelburne Bay and floated over a railroad carriage resting on specially laid tracks. The water was then pumped out of the basin, and Ticonderoga settled onto the railroad carriage. During the winter of 1955 Ticonderoga was hauled across highways, over a swamp, through woods and fields, and across the tracks of the Rutland Railway to reach her permanent mooring on the Shelburne Museum grounds.

Much of her interior was restored to its original grandeur. The dining room and stateroom halls retain their butternut and cherry paneling and ceilings their gold stenciling. The barbershop, captain's quarters, dining room, and promenade deck contain furniture and accessories used in the Ticonderoga and other Lake Champlain steamboats.

Ticonderoga was declared a National Historic Landmark in 1964 under the name Ticonderoga (Side-paddle-wheel Lakeboat).

== Gallery ==
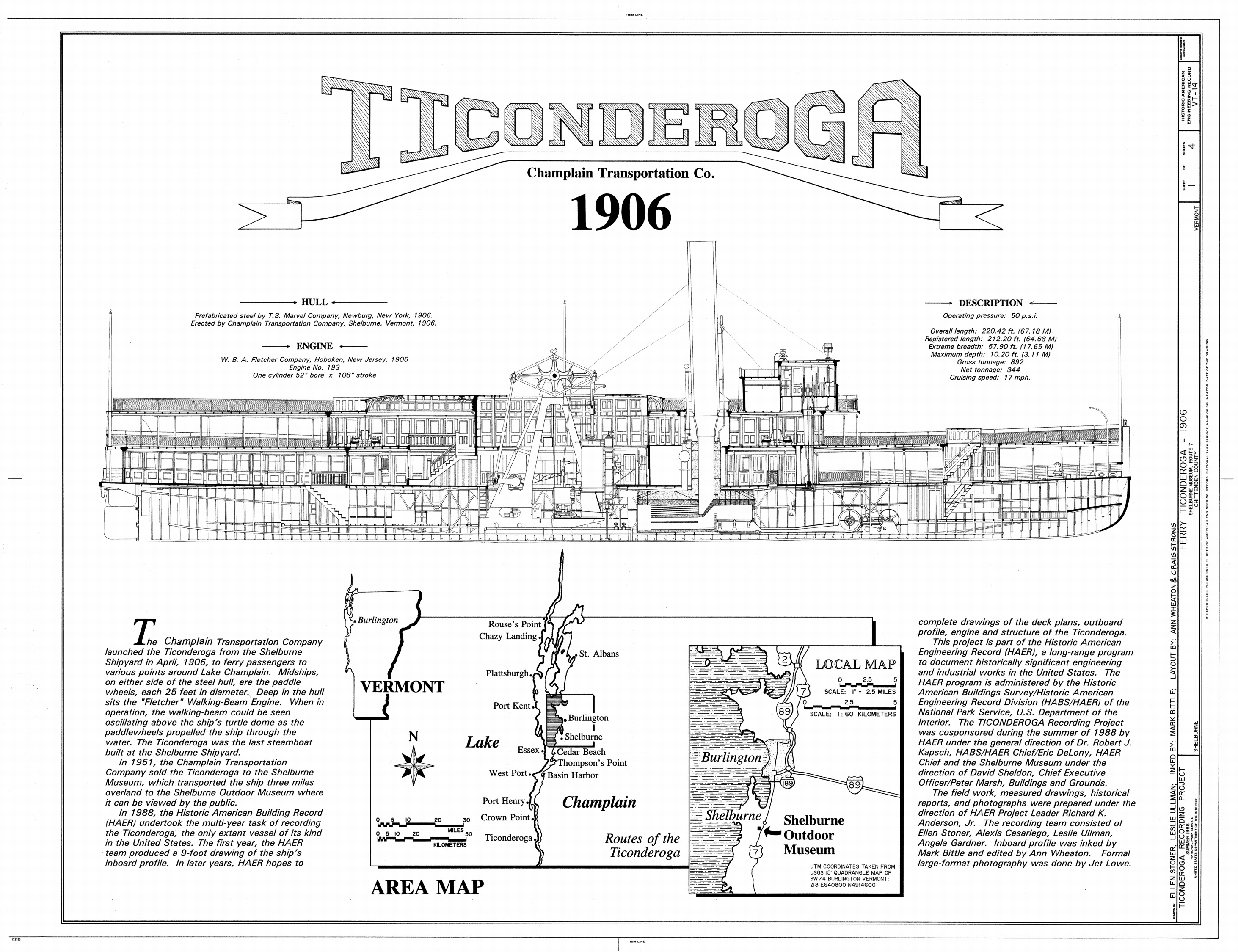
Plan of Ticonderoga

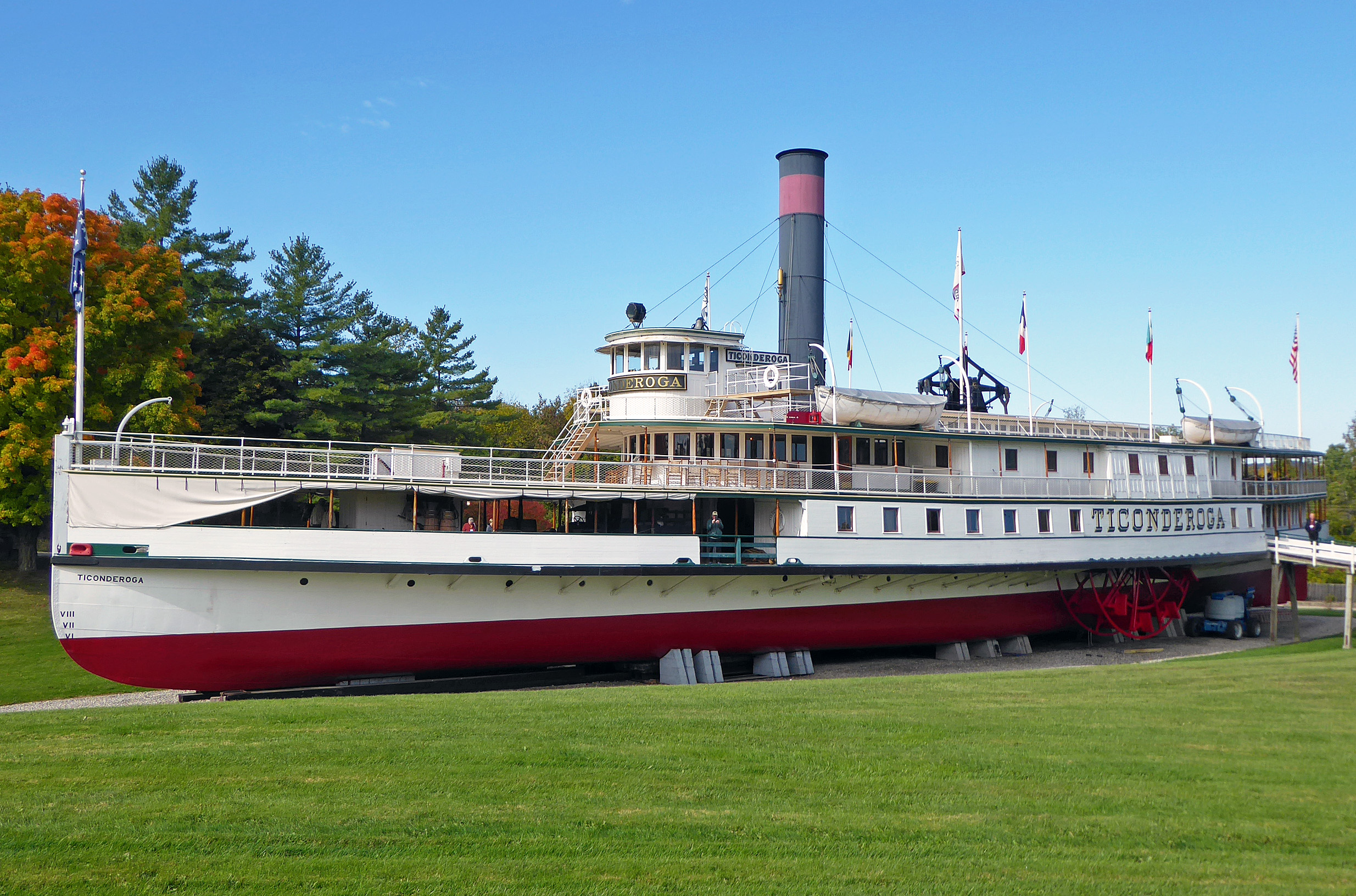
Ticonderoga in Shelburne Museum

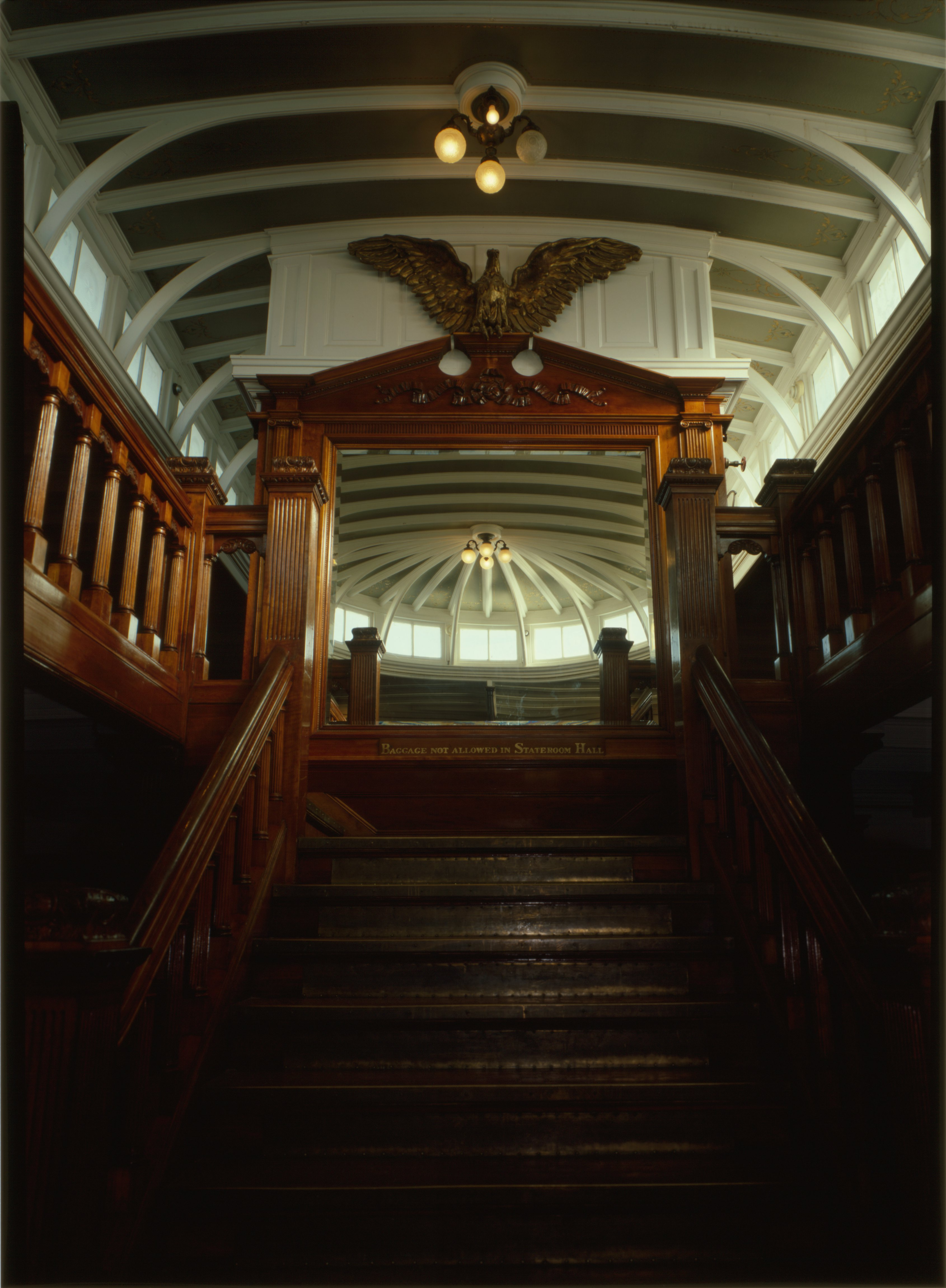
Main stairway

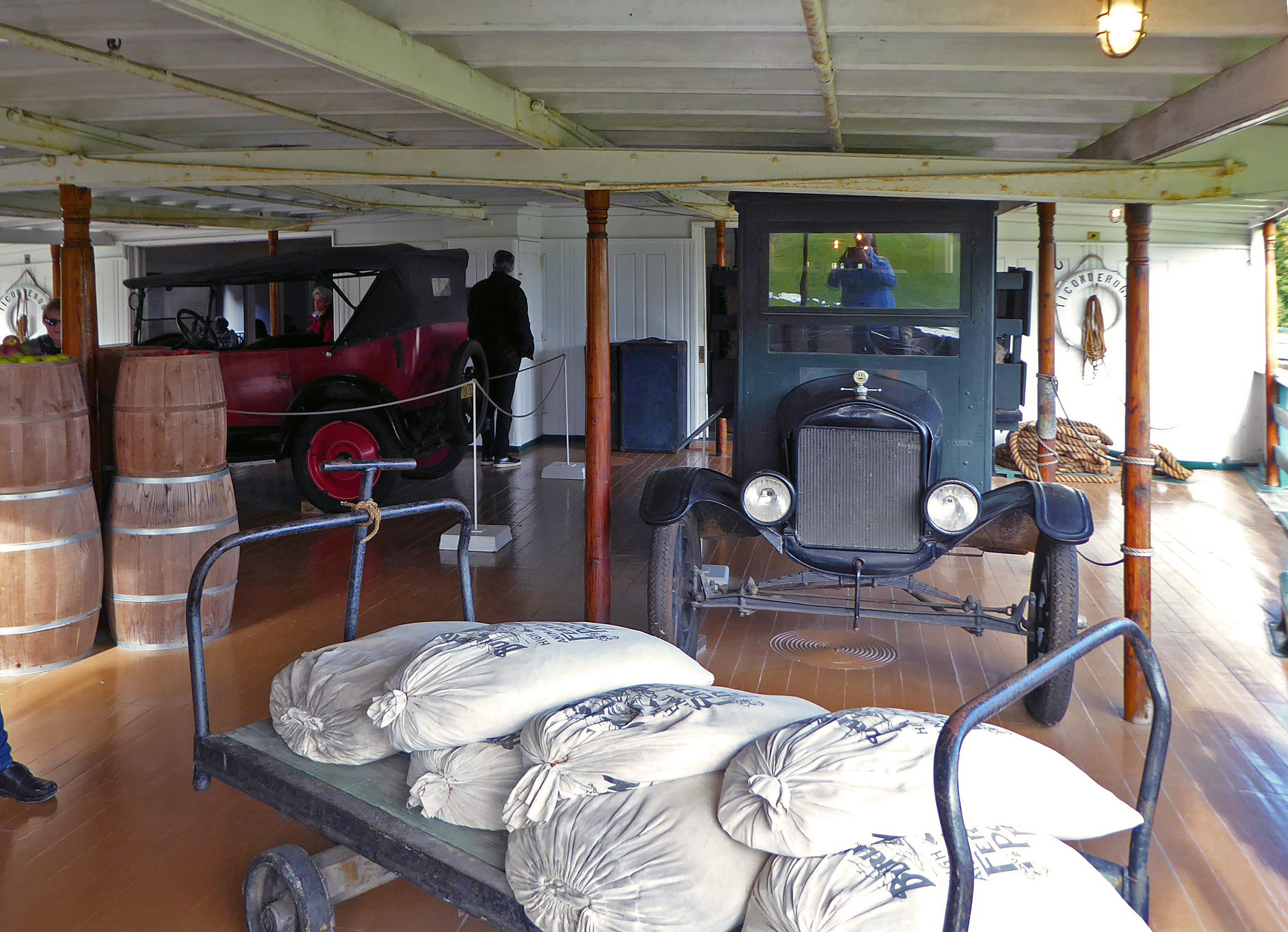
Cargo deck

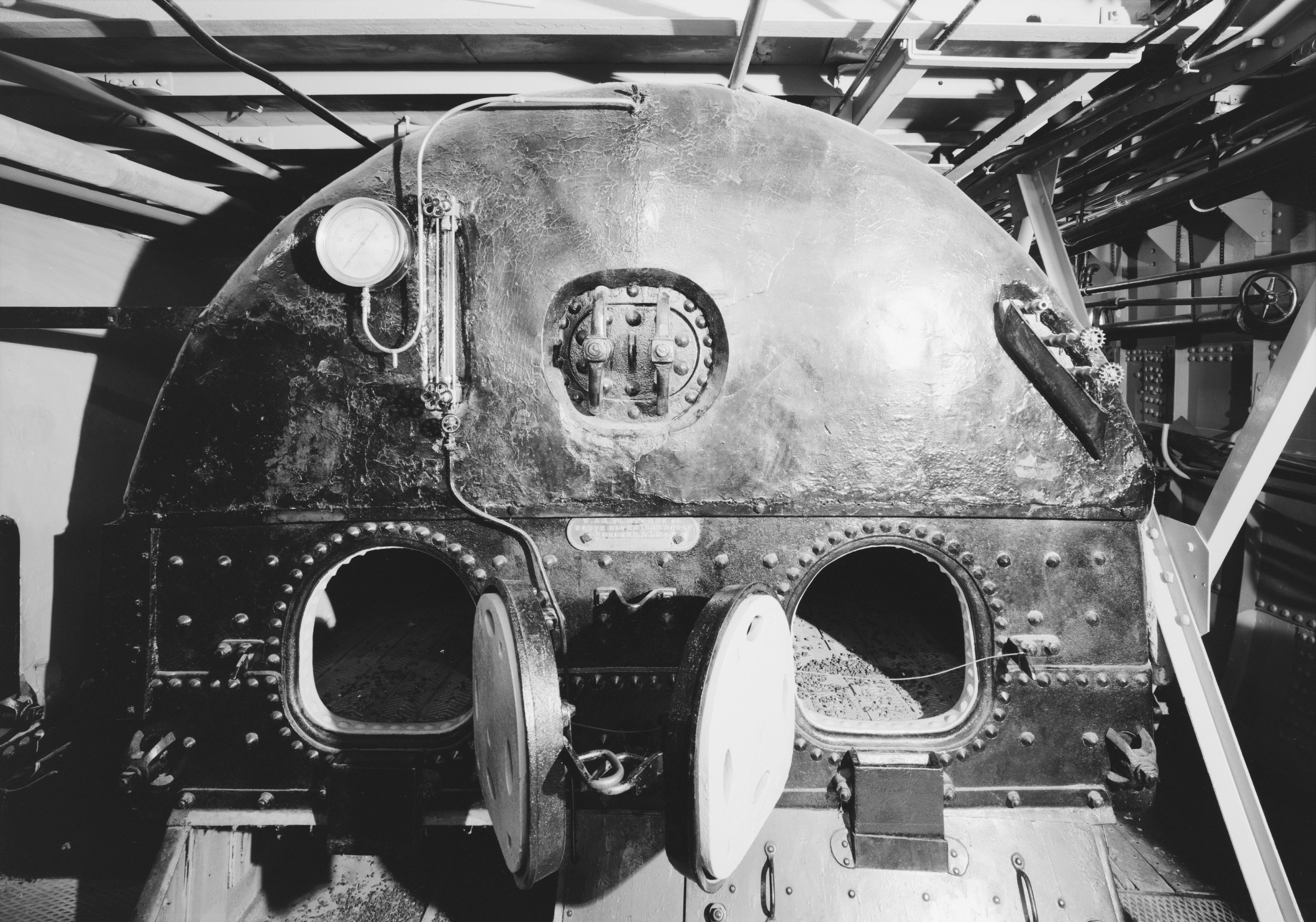
One of Ticonderoga's two "turtleback" boilers

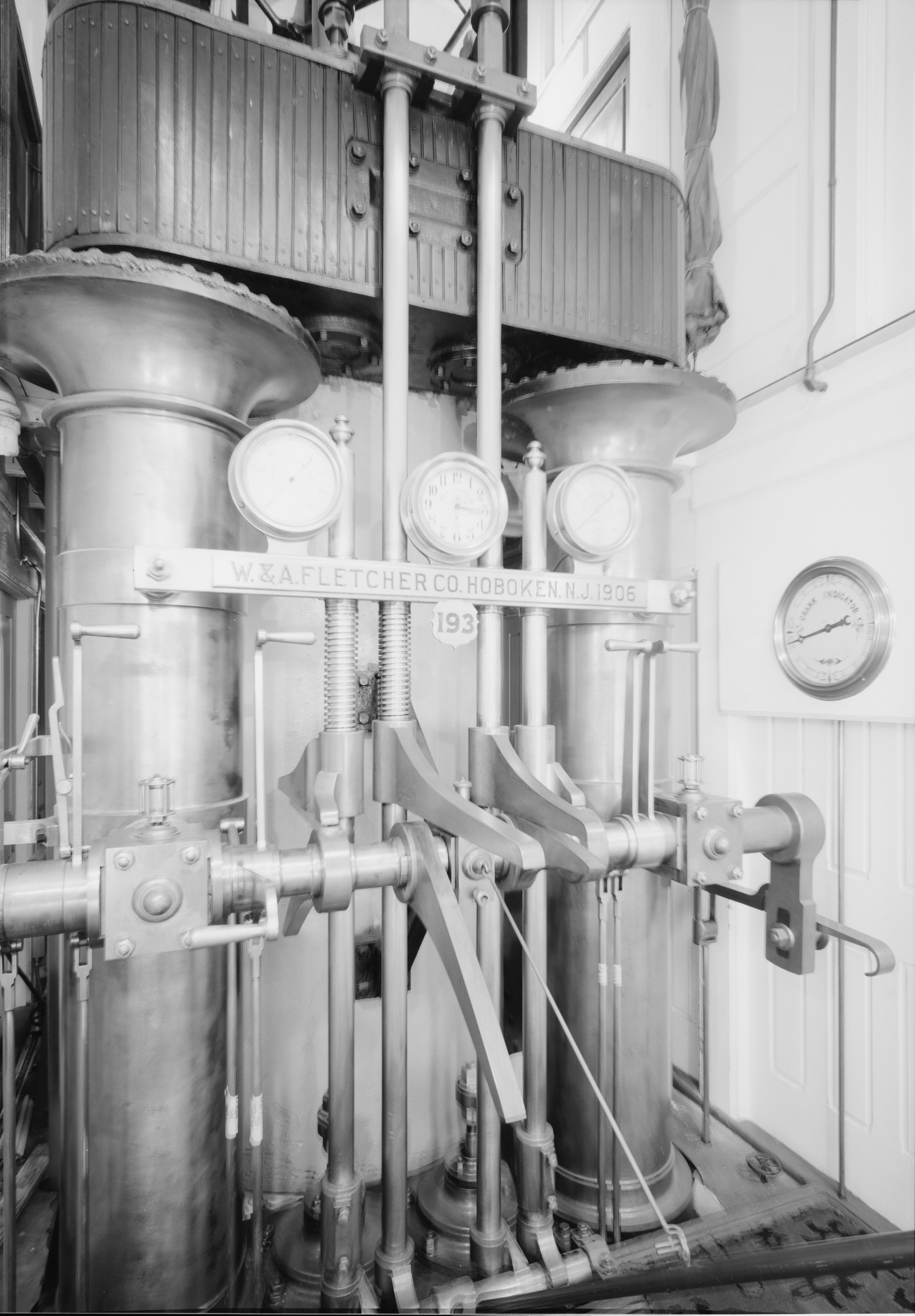
Engine controls and valve gear

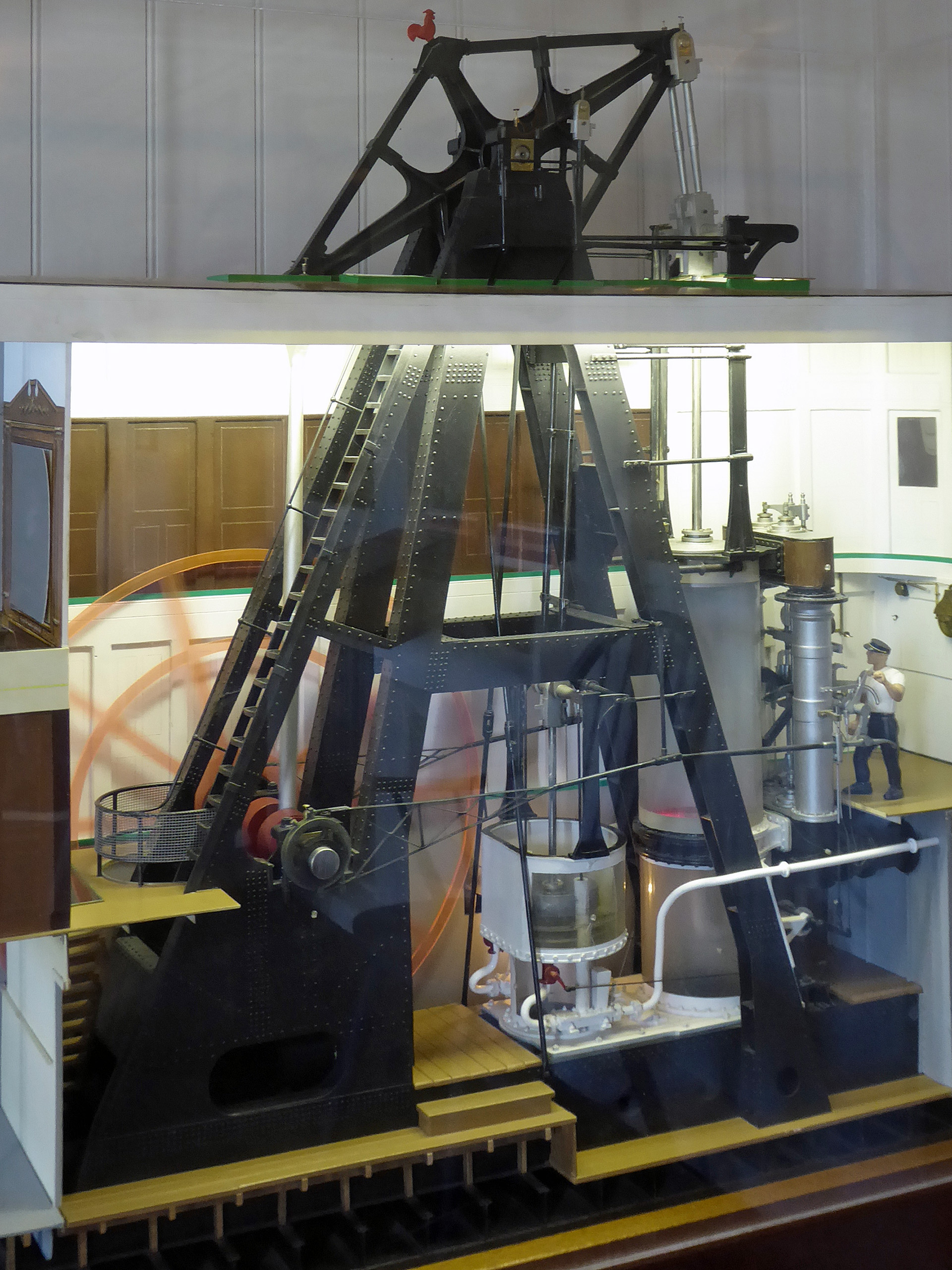
Model of the steam engine

== See also ==
- Historic American Engineering Record
- List of National Historic Landmarks in Vermont
- National Register of Historic Places listings in Chittenden County, Vermont
