= John Crocker (physicist) =

American chemical engineer (born 1968)

John C. Crocker
- Born: 1968 (age 57–58); Stoughton, Massachusetts
- Occupations: Physicist and chemical engineer

Academic background
- Education: A.B., Physics; A.M., Physics; Ph.D., Physics
- Alma mater: University of Chicago

Academic work
- Institutions: University of Pennsylvania

John C. Crocker (born 1968 in Stoughton, Massachusetts) is an American physicist and chemical engineer. He is a Professor of Chemical and Biomolecular Engineering at the University of Pennsylvania.

Crocker's research is focused in soft matter physics, nanotechnology and cell mechanics.

== Education ==
Crocker studied Physics at the University of Chicago, graduating with an AB in Physics in 1990. He continued his graduate studies at the University of Chicago and completed this program in 1996, receiving AM and PhD degrees in Physics, under the supervision of David G. Grier. This was followed by postdoctoral study with Arjun G. Yodh and David A. Weitz at the University of Pennsylvania.

== Career ==
In 2000, following his postdoctoral work, Crocker was appointed as Assistant Professor in Applied Physics at the California Institute of Technology. In 2001, he moved to become Skirkanich Assistant Professor of Innovation in Chemical and Biomolecular engineering at the University of Pennsylvania. Crocker was promoted to Associate Professor in 2007, and full Professor in 2014.

== Research ==
Crocker is known for his early work on particle tracking in two- and three-dimensions, and the measurement of small forces between colloidal micro particles using optical tweezers. His other significant work includes the development of two-point microrheology and its application to cell mechanics and force spectrum microscopy measurements, as well as the use of DNA hybridization to direct the formation of novel colloidal crystals. His later work involves the use of energy landscape methods to understanding soft glassy materials, such as foams and the actomyosin cytoskeleton.

== Awards and honors ==
- 1995 - Grainger Graduate Fellowship for Experimental Physics
- 2002 - Fellow of the David & Lucile Packard Foundation
- 2005 - "Brilliant 10", Popular Science Magazine
- 2018 - Fellow of the American Physical Society

== Selected articles ==
- Crocker JC, Grier DG, Methods of digital video microscopy for colloidal studies, J Colloid Interface Sci, 179 298–310, 1996.
- Weeks ER, Crocker JC, Levitt AC, Schofield A, Weitz DA, Three-dimensional direct imaging of structural relaxation near the colloidal glass transition, Science, 287 627–631, 2000.
- Crocker JC, Grier DG, Microscopic Measurement of the Pair Interaction Potential of Charge-Stabilized Colloid, Phys Rev Lett, 73 352–355, 1994.
- Crocker JC, Valentine MT, Weeks ER, Gisler T, Kaplan PD, Yodh AG, Weitz DA, Two-point microrheology of inhomogeneous soft materials, Phys Rev Lett, 85 888–891, 2000.
- Lau AWC, Hoffman BD, Davies A, Crocker JC, Lubensky TC, Microrheology, stress fluctuations, and active behavior of living cells, Phys Rev Lett, 91, 198101-(1-4), 2003.
