= John Coker (cleric) =

Anglican cleric and misattributed author

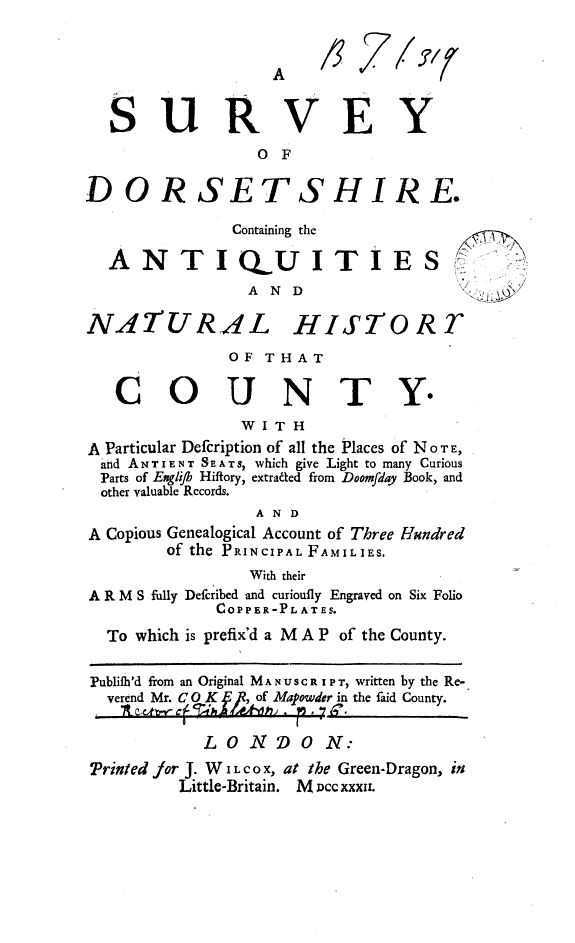
A Survey of Dorsetshire (1732). The earliest county history of Dorset, incorrectly attributed to Coker.

John Coker (d. 1631/35) was an English Anglican cleric and the once-reputed author of A Survey of Dorsetshire, a county history published in 1732.

== Life and career ==
Coker was the third son of Robert Coker of Mappowder, Dorset (d. 1571/2) and his wife, Elizabeth, the daughter and heir of Henry Beaumont of Giddesham. He served as rector of Tincleton from 1576 to 1579 or 1582, as a new rector's name was only recorded on the second date. After this office, Coker probably retired to Mappowder. The parish burial register records the burial of two John Cokers, in 1631 and 1635. It is not certain which is the clergyman.

=== A Survey of Dorsetshire ===
Coker was long believed to be the author of A Survey of Dorsetshire … to which is Prefix'd a Map of the County (1732), a systematic description of the history, topography, and genealogy of the county, published sometime after the author's death. This was revealed to be a misattribution by county historian Rodney Legg, in an afterword to the 1980 facsimile edition of the work. The survey was, in fact, composed by Thomas Gerard (1592–1634) in the 1620s and passed on to the Coker family upon his death. Nearly a century later a London bookseller, John Wilcox, published it under John Coker's name.
