= John Coker (cricketer) =

English cricketer

Personal information
- Full name: John Coker
- Born: 28 July 1821; Cheltenham, Gloucestershire, England
- Died: 30 July 1901 (aged 80); Tingewick, Buckinghamshire, England
- Batting: Unknown

Domestic team information
- Years: Team
- 1840–1844: Oxford University

Career statistics
Competition	First-class
Matches	11
Runs scored	136
Batting average	6.80
100s/50s	–/–
Top score	27
Catches/stumpings	2/–
- Source: Cricinfo, 23 February 2020

John Coker (28 July 1821 – 30 July 1901) was an English first-class cricketer and clergyman.

The son of Thomas Lewis Coker, he was born at Cheltenham in July 1821. He was educated at Winchester College, before going up to New College, Oxford. While studying at Oxford he played first-class cricket for Oxford University, making his debut against the Marylebone Cricket Club at Oxford in 1840. He played first-class cricket for Oxford until 1844, making eleven appearances. He scored a total of 136 runs at an average of 6.80, with a high score of 27. After graduating from Oxford, Coker took holy orders in the Church of England. He was the rector of Tingewick in Buckinghamshire for 46 years, until his death there in July 1901.
