= John Crocker (disambiguation) =

John Crocker was a British Army officer.

John Crocker may also refer to:

- J. Howard Crocker (John Howard Crocker; 1870–1959), Canadian educator and sports executive
- John Crocker (jazz musician)
- John Crocker (physicist)
- John Crocker (MP for Tavistock), English MP for Tavistock (UK Parliament constituency), 1394
- John Crocker (died 1508) (c. 1433–1508), English MP for Devon (UK Parliament constituency), 1491
- John Crocker (actor) (1925–2015), English actor
- John Crocker, the post-scratch version of John Egbert from Homestuck
