= He'd Have to Get Under – Get Out and Get Under (to Fix Up His Automobile) =

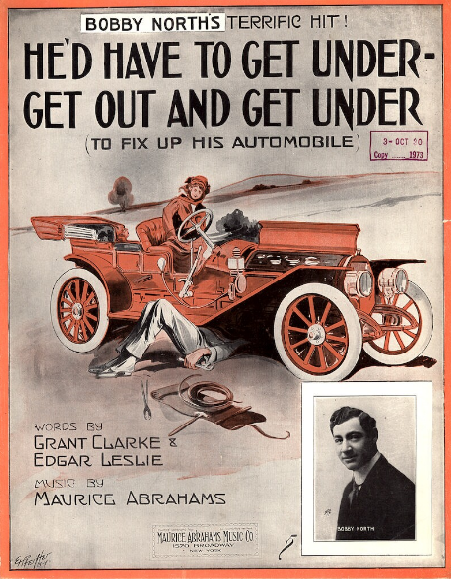
Sheet music cover for "He'd Have to Get Under – Get Out and Get Under (to Fix Up His Automobile)" as performed by Bobby North

"He'd Have to Get Under – Get Out and Get Under (to Fix Up His Automobile)" is one of the lengthier titles in the history of popular songs. The song was published in 1913, with music by Maurice Abrahams and lyrics by Grant Clarke and Edgar Leslie.

It was introduced in vaudeville by Adele Ritchie, was a hit for recording artists such as Al Jolson in 1913, Billy Murray in 1914, duo Debbie Reynolds and Carleton Carpenter in 1951 and was revived by Bobby Horton in the Ken Burns documentary film Horatio's Drive (2003). The Harvard Krokodiloes use the song, under the name "Johnny O'Connor," as their alumni song, inviting any former Kroks in the audience to come on stage and sing with them.

The title was essentially self-defining. The song poked fun at the trials and tribulations of the average young car owner of the 1910s, especially when he wanted to get down to some serious "sparking" with his female passenger.

The song also inspired a 1920 silent comedy, "Get Out And Get Under", starring Harold Lloyd and directed by Hal Roach for Pathe Films.

== Lyrics ==
=== Verse 1 ===
Johnny O'Connor bought an automobile,
He took his sweetheart for a ride one Sunday.
Johnny was togged up in his best Sunday clothes,
She nestled close to his side.
Things were just dandy till he got down the road,
Then something happened to the old machin'ry.
That engine got his goat,
Off went his hat and coat,
Ev'rything needed repairs.

=== Chorus ===
He'd have to get under,
Get out and get under
To fix up his little machine.
He was just dying to cuddle his queen,
But ev'ry minute
When he'd begin it,
He'd have to get under,
Get out and get under,
Then he'd get back at the wheel.
A dozen times they'd start to hug and kiss
And then the darned old engine it would miss,
And then he'd have to get under,
Get out and get under,
And fix up his automobile.

=== Verse 2 ===
Millionaire Wilson said to Johnny one day,
"Your little sweetheart don't appreciate you,
I have a daughter who is hungry for love,
She likes to ride, by the way".
Johnny had visions of a million in gold,
He took her riding in his little auto,
But ev'ry time that he went to say "Marry me",
'Twas the old story again.

=== Chorus ===
He'd have to get under,
Get out and get under
To fix up his little machine.
He was just dying to cuddle his queen,
But ev'ry minute
When he'd begin it,
He'd have to get under,
Get out and get under,
Then he'd get back at the wheel.
A dozen times they'd start to hug and kiss
And then the darned old engine it would miss,
And then he'd have to get under,
Get out and get under,
And fix up his automobile.
ALTERNATIVE CHORUS VERSES
A dozen times of love he'd try to speak,
And then the radiator it would leak,
And then he'd have to get under,
Get out and get under,
And fix up his automobile.
To kiss and squeeze he'd boldly get to work,
And then the brakes would slip there'd be a jerk,
And then he'd have to get under,
Get out and get under,
And fix up his automobile.
He'd start to tell the tale with lots of swank,
And then he'd find no petrol in the tank
And then he'd have to get under,
Get out and get under,
And fix up his automobile.
And then he'd have to get under—get out and get under—and fix up his automobile.
