= Crocker child murders =

American murder victims

Elwyn Crocker Jr. and Mary Crocker
- Cause of death: Murder
- Body discovered: Guyton, Effingham County, Georgia, U.S.
- Father: Elwyn Crocker Sr.

Elwyn Crocker Jr. and Mary Crocker were two American children whose remains were discovered buried in their family's backyard in Effingham County, Georgia in December 2018.

Elwyn Jr. disappeared in November 2016 at age 14, while his younger sister, Mary, disappeared in October 2018 at age 13. Their father, Elwyn Crocker Sr., and their stepmother, Candice Crocker, had withdrawn each child from classes at South Effingham Middle School, claiming to school officials that both siblings would be homeschooled. Neither child was ever reported to be missing, and their disappearances were only discovered after the local police department received a tip from a family relative who believed that Mary was deceased. After police officers interviewed the children's father, they searched the grounds of the family's residence in Guyton, Georgia, a small city northwest of Savannah. Human remains were discovered on the property on December 20, 2018, the date of Mary Crocker's 14th birthday.

In late October 2020, the children's stepmother pleaded guilty to murder, torture, sexual battery, and keeping both Elwyn Jr. and Mary in dog crates. In order to escape Georgia's death penalty, she agreed to testify in court against her husband, her mother, and her brother, all of whom lived in the family home. She will serve a term of life imprisonment without parole. In April 2026, the children's father, Elwyn Crocker Sr., pleaded guilty to similar charges in a plea deal that allowed him to avoid the death penalty; he was sentenced to life in prison without parole. The three other individuals involved in the children's deaths also took a plea deal to serve extensive time in prison and avoid the death penalty.

== Victims ==
Elwyn John Crocker Jr., age 14, disappeared in November 2016. He was the older brother of Mary Frances Crocker, who disappeared two years later, at age 13, in October 2018. Sometime before, the children's father, 49-year-old Elwyn Crocker Sr., and his wife (and the children's stepmother), 33-year-old Candice Crocker, had withdrawn each child from classes at South Effingham Middle School; they informed school officials that both siblings would be homeschooled. Six years earlier, in 2012, Elwyn Crocker Sr. and his wife had received counseling from Effingham County's Department of Family and Children Services following reports that they were abusing Elwyn Crocker Jr. Both adults agreed to undergo therapy and take classes in parenting, and the department closed the case in 2013. However, neither child was ever reported to be missing, and their disappearances were only discovered after the local police department received a tip from a family relative who believed that Mary Crocker was deceased. After police officers interviewed the children's father, they decided to search the grounds of the family's residence in Guyton, Georgia, a small city located 28 miles (45 km) northwest of Savannah.

Human remains were discovered on the property on December 20, 2018, Mary Crocker's 14th birthday, and the Effingham County coroner noted that Elwyn Crocker Jr. would have been 17 years old. The teenagers' bodies, both dressed in diapers, were found buried beneath cement bags and trash bags behind the family's house.

== Suspects ==
Elwyn Crocker Sr. and Candice Crocker were arrested. Elwyn Sr. had recently worked in Rincon, Georgia, as a Santa for Walmart. Also arrested were the three other adults who lived in the home: Candice Crocker's mother, Kimberly (Kim) Wright, age 50; Wright's male companion, Roy Prater, 55 years old; and Mark Anthony Wright, the son of Kim Wright and brother of Candice Crocker.

Investigators determined that both Mary and Elwyn Jr. had been "starved, beaten and kept in a dog cage". Mary Crocker was also "punished for not exercising, skipping chores, and stealing food." Mary was also bound with zip ties and shocked with a stun gun. Someone in the family took a photo of Mary in front of the cage; in the photo, she is "nude, gaunt, and bruised." Her father admitted the photo depicted Mary undergoing punishment and that he used zip ties to prevent her from escaping. A sheriff's investigator also said the family would mix rice vinegar into her food to make it less palatable, which contributed to her starvation. Mary's joints would stiffen due to the prolonged time she spent in the cage, and her family members would attempt to straighten her limbs by taping her to a ladder. Elwyn Jr. was "abused and starved" as well, in a manner investigators said was similar to the torture that Mary experienced. All five adults were charged with multiple counts that included felony murder, concealing a death, and child cruelty. Initially, all of the suspects except Prater pleaded not guilty.

At the time of the arrests, a child with cerebral palsy who lived in the home was taken into the care of Effingham County social services.

== Subsequent developments ==
In February 2020, Roy Prater pleaded guilty to murder and concealing a death. He became the first of the five suspects to plead guilty in order to avoid Georgia's death penalty. In late October of that year, the children's stepmother, Candice Crocker, pleaded guilty to murder, torture, sexual battery, and keeping both Elwyn Jr. and Mary in dog crates. She agreed to testify against her husband, mother, and brother to escape the death penalty. She will serve a term of life imprisonment without parole.

The principal suspect, Elwyn Crocker Sr., faced multiple counts including murder, child cruelty, false imprisonment, and concealing a death. Crocker's mother-in-law, Kim Wright, was charged with multiple counts including malice murder, felony murder, sexual battery, concealing a death, and false imprisonment. Her son, Mark Anthony Wright, was charged with multiple counts of malice murder, the felony murder of Mary Crocker, child cruelty, concealing a death, and false imprisonment. All three defendants initially pleaded not guilty and faced the death penalty if convicted.

In November 2024, an Effingham County judge denied a motion filed by defense attorneys in 2019 to dismiss the original indictment against the three remaining defendants; the attorneys claimed that the grand jury charged with the case had been "compromised".

Crocker Sr. returned to the Effingham County Courthouse on August 19, 2025, for further evidentiary hearings. His lawyers announced that they would contest the use in any future trial of "digital images and other evidence recorded on several devices taken from the [Crocker family] home during the investigation". The images were said to show the abuse of both children by certain family members.

Mark Wright, the brother of Candice Crocker, pleaded guilty in early 2025 to multiple charges that included second-degree murder, child cruelty, and concealing the children's deaths, thus avoiding the death penalty. In November, he received the maximum total sentence of 80 years in prison.

In September 2025, Kim Wright, the mother of Candice Crocker and Mark Wright, pleaded guilty in a "negotiated plea deal" that required her future testimony in court. She will serve a lifetime prison sentence without the possibility of parole.

In February 2026, Roy Prater, Kim Wright's companion, died while in state custody and before his formal sentencing to a prison term.

== Principal suspect ==
In late April 2026, Elwyn Crocker Sr., the children's biological father, also accepted a guilty plea deal that formally removed the death penalty as a sentencing option. He was charged with "murder, aggravated sexual battery, cruelty to children, false imprisonment, and concealing the death of another". Prosecutors suggested that they were amenable to such a deal owing to several difficulties arising from the case, including the death earlier that year of Roy Prater, a suspect and key witness. The prosecution had already released a statement announcing that two additional witnesses in the case were "no longer available", although it did not elaborate; two other prosecutors had previously withdrawn from the case. The prosecution stated that it had "lost valuable evidence in the form of witness testimony" and that the case faced other hurdles due to "delays, [...] the complexity of the case[,] and others from circumstances beyond anyone's control." Crocker Sr. was sentenced to two terms of life imprisonment without parole, one term of life with parole, and an additional 120 years' imprisonment.

== See also ==
- List of solved missing person cases (2010s)
- List of unsolved murders (2000–present)
