= Jonathan Crocker =

English cricketer

Personal information
- Full name: Jonathan Alfred Crocker
- Born: 8 October 1874; Kensington, Middlesex, England
- Died: 21 July 1944 (aged 69); Westminster, London, England
- Batting: Unknown
- Bowling: Unknown

Domestic team information
- Years: Team
- 1894: Cambridge University

Career statistics
Competition	First-class
Matches	4
Runs scored	65
Batting average	10.83
100s/50s	–/–
Top score	29
Balls bowled	235
Wickets	5
Bowling average	26.40
5 wickets in innings	–
10 wickets in match	–
Best bowling	2/27
Catches/stumpings	2/–
- Source: Cricinfo, 29 July 2023

Jonathan Alfred Crocker (8 October 1874 – 21 July 1944) was an English cricketer who played first-class cricket in four matches for Cambridge University in 1894. He was born at Kensington and died at Westminster, both in London.

Crocker was educated at Eton College and Trinity College, Cambridge. As a cricketer, he was played as a lower-order batsman and a second-line bowler in his first-class matches, though it is not known whether he was right- or left-handed, nor what style of bowler he was. He was one of the successes of the 1894 freshmen's cricket trial at Cambridge, taking six wickets for 66 runs in the first innings. His second match for the university in 1894 was his best: against a side raised by A. J. Webbe, he made scores of 29 and 16 and took two wickets in the first innings, though he was not among the eight bowlers used in the Webbe XI's second innings. But he did not succeed in subsequent matches and dropped out of the Cambridge team without being awarded a Blue. He played for Hertfordshire in the year before the Minor Counties Championship was instituted, but never played in a Minor Counties match.

Crocker graduated from Cambridge University in 1897 with a Bachelor of Arts degree and went into business. He served with the 3rd County of London Yeomanry (Sharpshooters) and the City of London Yeomanry (Rough Riders) in the First World War and saw action in France, Egypt and at Gallipoli.
