= Vermont (automobile) =

First automobile to cross the United States

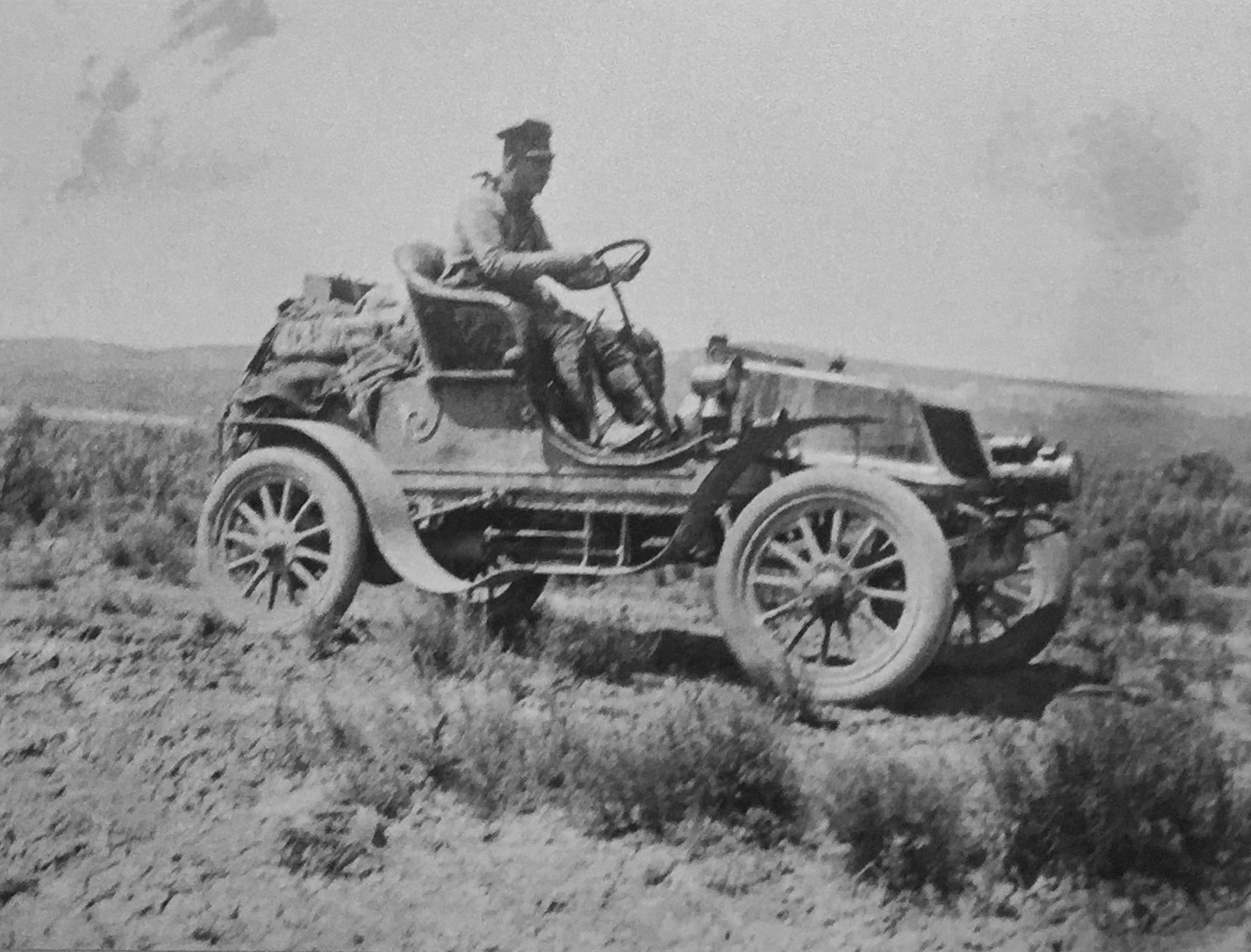
Jackson driving the Vermont on 1903 cross-country drive

The Vermont is a name given to a 1903 Winton that became the first automobile to cross the United States. It traveled from San Francisco, California to Manhattan, New York. The crew was owner Horatio Nelson Jackson, mechanic Sewall K. Crocker and their dog Bud.

The car is in the permanent collection of the Smithsonian Institution's National Museum of American History after Jackson himself donated the vehicle to the museum.
