= Dayton Duncan =

American screenwriter

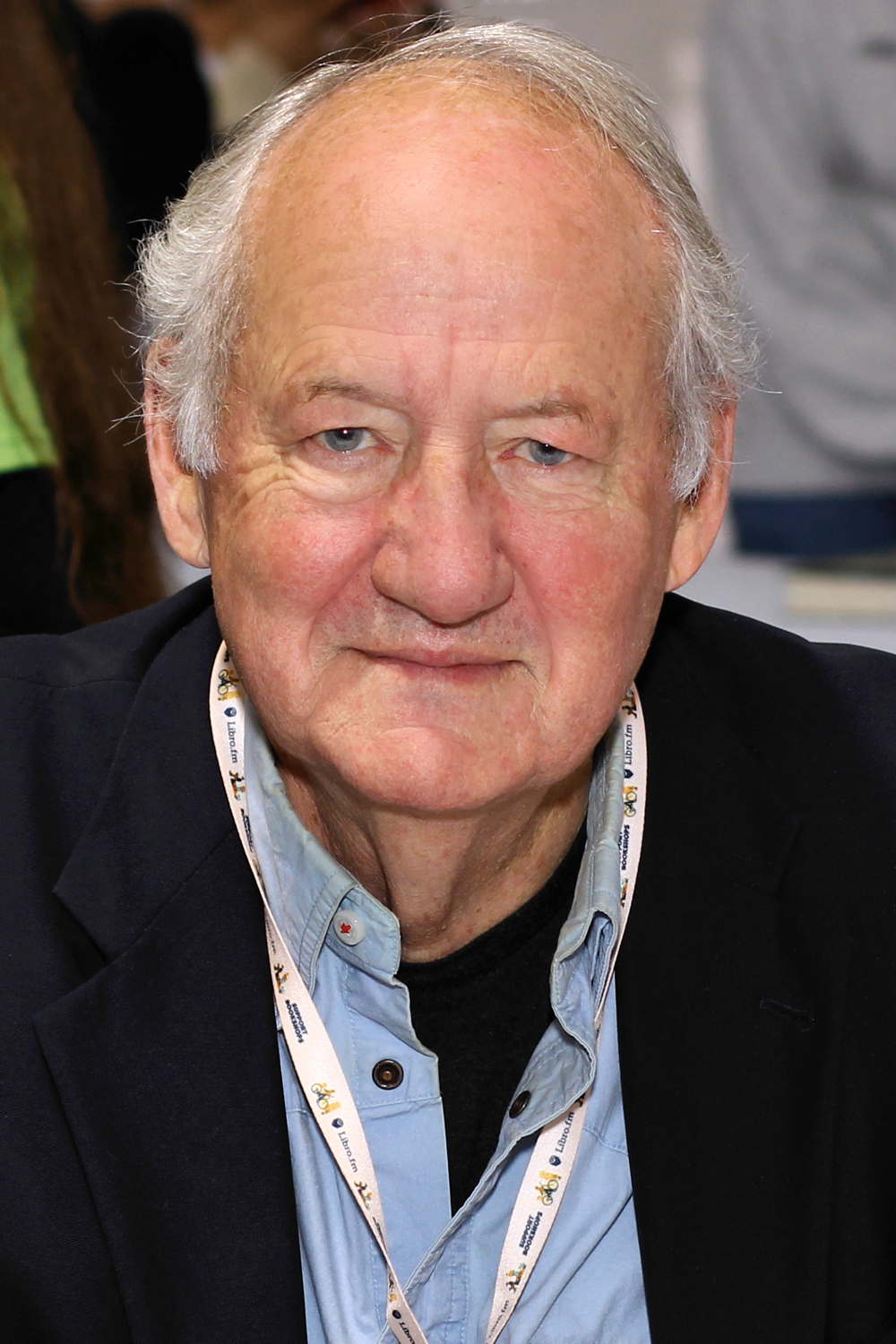
- Duncan at the 2023 Texas Book Festival.
- Born: Dayton Duncan; September 3, 1949 (age 76); Indianola, Iowa
- Education: University of Pennsylvania
- Occupations: Screenwriter, producer
- Writing career
- Years active: 1971–present

Dayton Duncan (born September 3, 1949) is an American screenwriter, producer and former political aide.

He is best known for his collaborations with documentary maker Ken Burns.

== Early life and education ==
Born and raised in Indianola, Iowa, Duncan graduated from the University of Pennsylvania in 1971 with a degree in German literature and was also a fellow at Harvard's Shorenstein Center for Press, Politics and Public Policy.

== Political career ==
Duncan served as chief of staff to New Hampshire governor Hugh Gallen until the latter's death in 1982. In 1984, he served as deputy national press secretary for Walter Mondale's presidential campaign, and in 1988, as national press secretary for Michael Dukakis's presidential campaign.

In 1998, President Clinton appointed him chair of the American Heritage Rivers Advisory Committee and Secretary of Interior Bruce Babbitt appointed him as a director of the National Park Foundation.

== Screenwriting ==
Dayton wrote and co-produced the Ken Burns-directed documentaries Lewis & Clark: The Journey of the Corps of Discovery, Mark Twain, Horatio's Drive: America's First Road Trip, Country Music and The National Parks: America's Best Idea. He was also involved in Burns' series The Civil War, Baseball and Jazz.

Dayton co-wrote Stephen Ives's Erik Barnouw Award-winning documentary series The West.
