= Ralph Nading Hill =

American historian

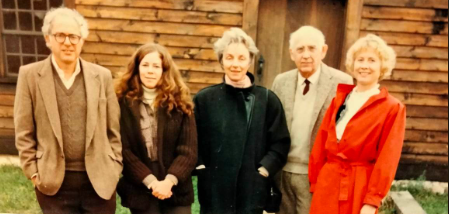
Ralph Nading Hill with Bernie Sanders, Jennifer Ely, Madeleine Kunin, and an unknown woman in front of the Allen House

Ralph Nading Hill (September 19, 1917 – December 10, 1987) was a Vermont writer and preservationist. He was a 1939 graduate of Dartmouth College.

Hill's books include The Winooski, Heartway of Vermont (1949), a book in the Rivers of America Series which viewed Vermont through the lens of the river known to the Algonquians as "The Onion River" and Sidewheeler Saga, a book about the steamboat Ticonderoga, the last sidewheel steamer on Lake Champlain. Hill worked on the boat, which traveled between Vermont and New York across Lake Champlain, for three years.

Hill later became well known in Vermont for preserving the Ticonderoga, at first trying to keep the boat running as an excursion steamer, and then persuading Electra Havemeyer Webb to buy the ship for her Shelburne Museum. The ship was transported overland to the museum in 1955.

== Bibliography ==
- Lake Champlain, Key to Liberty
- The Doctors Who Conquered Yellow Fever
- Yankee Kingdom: Vermont and New Hampshire, 1960
- The Mad Doctor's Drive, 1964
- Contrary Country: A Chronicle of Vermont
- Vermont; A Special World
- Vermont Album: A Collection of Early Vermont Photographs
- The Winooski: Heartway of Vermont
- The Voyages of Brian Seaworthy
- Robert Fulton and the Steamboat
- Lake Champlain Ferryboats: A Short History of Lake Champlain and the Story of Over 200 Years of Lake Champlain Ferryboats
