= Project Mercury =

Initial American crewed spaceflight program (1958–1963)

- The astronomical symbol for planet Mercury, with the Arabic numeral 7 overlaid

Program overview
- Country: United States
- Organization: NASA
- Purpose: Crewed orbital flight
- Status: Completed

Program history
- Cost: $277 million (1965); $2.83 billion (adjusted for inflation)
- Duration: 1958–1963
- First flight: Big Joe 1; September 9, 1959
- First crewed flight: Mercury-Redstone 3; May 5, 1961
- Last flight: Mercury-Atlas 9; May 15, 1963
- Successes: 11
- Failures: 3 (MA-1, MA-3, and MR-1)
- Partial failures: 1 (Big Joe 1)
- Launch sites: Cape Canaveral; Wallops

Vehicle information
- Crewed vehicle: Mercury capsule
- Launch vehicles: Atlas LV-3B; Big Joe; Blue Scout II; Little Joe; Mercury-Redstone

Project Mercury was the first human spaceflight program of the United States, running from 1958 through 1963. An early highlight of the Space Race, its goal was to put a man into Earth orbit and return him safely, ideally before the Soviet Union. Taken over from the US Air Force by the newly created civilian space agency NASA, it conducted 20 uncrewed developmental flights (some using animals), and six successful flights by astronauts. The program, which took its name from Roman mythology, cost $2.83 billion (adjusted for inflation). (Note: The project was delayed by 22 months, counting from the beginning until the first orbital mission. It had a dozen prime contractors, 75 major subcontractors, and about 7200 third-tier subcontractors. The cost estimate made by NASA in 1969 was $392.6 million, broken down as follows: Spacecraft: $135.3 million, launch vehicles: $82.9 million, operations: $49.3 million, tracking operations and equipment: $71.9 million and facilities: $53.2 million.) The astronauts were collectively known as the "Mercury Seven", and each spacecraft was given a name ending with a "7" by its pilot.

The Space Race began with the 1957 launch of the Soviet satellite Sputnik 1. This came as a shock to the American public, and led to the creation of NASA to expedite existing US space exploration efforts, and place most of them under civilian control. After the successful launch of the Explorer 1 satellite in 1958, crewed spaceflight became the next goal. The Soviet Union put the first human, cosmonaut Yuri Gagarin, into a single orbit aboard Vostok 1 on April 12, 1961. Shortly after this, on May 5, the US launched its first astronaut, Alan Shepard, on a suborbital flight. Soviet Gherman Titov followed with a day-long orbital flight in August 1961. The US reached its orbital goal on February 20, 1962, when John Glenn made three orbits around the Earth. When Mercury ended in May 1963, both nations had sent six people into space, but the Soviets led the US in total time spent in space.

The Mercury space capsule was produced by McDonnell Aircraft, and carried supplies of water, food and oxygen for about one day in a pressurized cabin. Mercury flights were launched from Cape Canaveral Air Force Station in Florida, on launch vehicles modified from the Redstone and Atlas D missiles. The capsule was fitted with a launch escape rocket to carry it safely away from the launch vehicle in case of a failure. The flight was designed to be controlled from the ground via the Manned Space Flight Network, a system of tracking and communications stations; back-up controls were outfitted on board. Small retrorockets were used to bring the spacecraft out of its orbit, after which an ablative heat shield protected it from the heat of atmospheric reentry. Finally, a parachute slowed the craft for a water landing. Both astronaut and capsule were recovered by helicopters deployed from a US Navy ship.

The Mercury project gained popularity, and its missions were followed by millions on radio and TV around the world. Its success laid the groundwork for Project Gemini, which carried two astronauts in each capsule and perfected space docking maneuvers essential for crewed lunar landings in the subsequent Apollo program announced a few weeks after the first crewed Mercury flight.

== Creation ==
Project Mercury was officially approved on October 7, 1958, and publicly announced on December 17. Originally called Project Astronaut, President Dwight Eisenhower felt that gave too much attention to the pilot. Instead, the name Mercury was chosen from classical mythology, which had already lent names to rockets like the Greek Atlas and Roman Jupiter for the SM-65 and PGM-19 missiles. It absorbed military projects with the same aim, such as the Air Force Man in Space Soonest. (Note: Man in Space Soonest was the first part of a four-phase Moon landing program estimated to finish in 1965, cost a total of $1.5 billion ($16.6 billion adjusted for inflation), and be launched by a "Super Titan" rocket.)

=== Background ===
Following the end of World War II, a nuclear arms race evolved between the US and the Soviet Union (USSR). Since the USSR did not have bases in the western hemisphere from which to deploy bomber planes, Joseph Stalin decided to develop intercontinental ballistic missiles, which drove a missile race. The rocket technology in turn enabled both sides to develop Earth-orbiting satellites for communications, and gathering weather data and intelligence.

Americans were shocked when the Soviet Union placed the first satellite into orbit in October 1957, leading to a growing fear that the US was falling into a "missile gap". A month later, the Soviets launched Sputnik 2, carrying a dog into orbit. Though the animal was not recovered alive, it was obvious their goal was human spaceflight. Unable to disclose details of military space projects, President Eisenhower ordered the creation of a civilian space agency in charge of civilian and scientific space exploration. Based on the federal research agency National Advisory Committee for Aeronautics (NACA), it was named the National Aeronautics and Space Administration (NASA). The agency achieved its first goal of launching a satellite into space, the Pioneer 1, in 1958. The next goal was to put a man there.

The limit of space (also known as the Kármán line) was defined at the time as a minimum altitude of 62 mi (100 km), and the only way to reach it was by using rocket-powered boosters. This created risks for the pilot, including explosion, high g-forces and vibrations during lift off through a dense atmosphere, and temperatures of more than 10,000 °F (5,500 °C) from air compression during reentry.

In space, pilots would require pressurized chambers or space suits to supply fresh air. While there, they would experience weightlessness, which could potentially cause disorientation. Further potential risks included radiation and micrometeoroid strikes, both of which would normally be absorbed in the atmosphere. All seemed possible to overcome: experience from satellites suggested micrometeoroid risk was negligible, and experiments in the early 1950s with simulated weightlessness, high g-forces on humans, and sending animals to the limit of space, all suggested potential problems could be overcome by known technologies. Finally, reentry was studied using the nuclear warheads of ballistic missiles, which demonstrated a blunt, forward-facing heat shield could solve the problem of heating.

=== Organization ===
T. Keith Glennan had been appointed the first Administrator of NASA, with Hugh L. Dryden (last Director of NACA) as his Deputy, at the creation of the agency on October 1, 1958. Glennan would report to the president through the National Aeronautics and Space Council. The group responsible for Project Mercury was NASA's Space Task Group, and the goals of the program were to orbit a crewed spacecraft around Earth, investigate the pilot's ability to function in space, and to recover both pilot and spacecraft safely. Existing technology and off-the-shelf equipment would be used wherever practical, the simplest and most reliable approach to system design would be followed, and an existing launch vehicle would be employed, together with a progressive test program. Spacecraft requirements included: a launch escape system to separate the spacecraft and its occupant from the launch vehicle in case of impending failure; attitude control for orientation of the spacecraft in orbit; a retrorocket system to bring the spacecraft out of orbit; drag braking blunt body for atmospheric reentry; and landing on water. To communicate with the spacecraft during an orbital mission, an extensive communications network had to be built. In keeping with his desire to keep from giving the US space program an overtly military flavor, President Eisenhower at first hesitated to give the project top national priority (DX rating under the Defense Production Act), which meant that Mercury had to wait in line behind military projects for materials; however, this rating was granted in May 1959, a little more than a year and a half after Sputnik was launched.

=== Contractors and facilities ===
Twelve companies bid to build the Mercury spacecraft on a $20 million ($221 million adjusted for inflation) contract. In January 1959, McDonnell Aircraft Corporation was chosen to be prime contractor for the spacecraft. Two weeks earlier, North American Aviation, based in Los Angeles, was awarded a contract for Little Joe, a small rocket to be used for development of the launch escape system. (Note: The name Little Joe was adopted by its designers from the throw of a double deuce in a craps game since this resembled the four-rocket arrangement in the blueprints for the vehicle.) The World Wide Tracking Network for communication between the ground and spacecraft during a flight was awarded to the Western Electric Company. Redstone rockets for suborbital launches were manufactured in Huntsville, Alabama, by the Chrysler Corporation and Atlas rockets by Convair in San Diego, California. For crewed launches, the Atlantic Missile Range at Cape Canaveral Air Force Station in Florida was made available by the USAF. This was also the site of the Mercury Control Center while the computing center of the communication network was in Goddard Space Center, Maryland. Little Joe rockets were launched from Wallops Island, Virginia. Astronaut training took place at Langley Research Center in Virginia, Lewis Flight Propulsion Laboratory in Cleveland, Ohio, and Naval Air Development Center Johnsville in Warminster, PA. Langley wind tunnels together with a rocket sled track at Holloman Air Force Base at Alamogordo, New Mexico were used for aerodynamic studies. Both Navy and Air Force aircraft were made available for the development of the spacecraft's landing system, and Navy ships and Navy and Marine Corps helicopters were made available for recovery. (Note: NASA's planning for recovery operations in the summer of 1960 was, according to the Navy, asking for the deployment of the whole Atlantic Fleet and might have cost more than the entire Mercury program.) South of Cape Canaveral the town of Cocoa Beach boomed. From here, 75,000 people watched the first American orbital flight being launched in 1962.

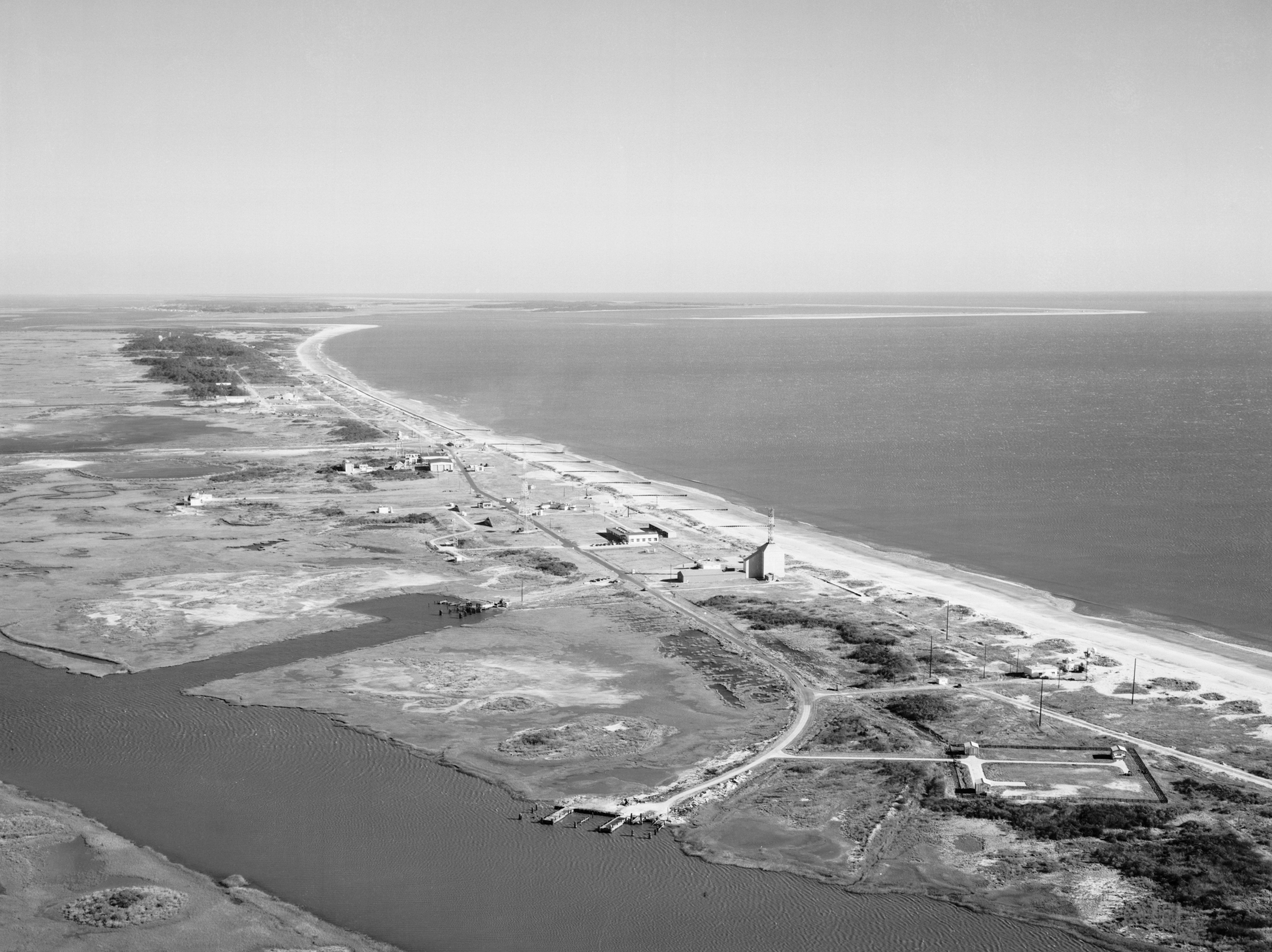
Wallops Island test facility, 1961

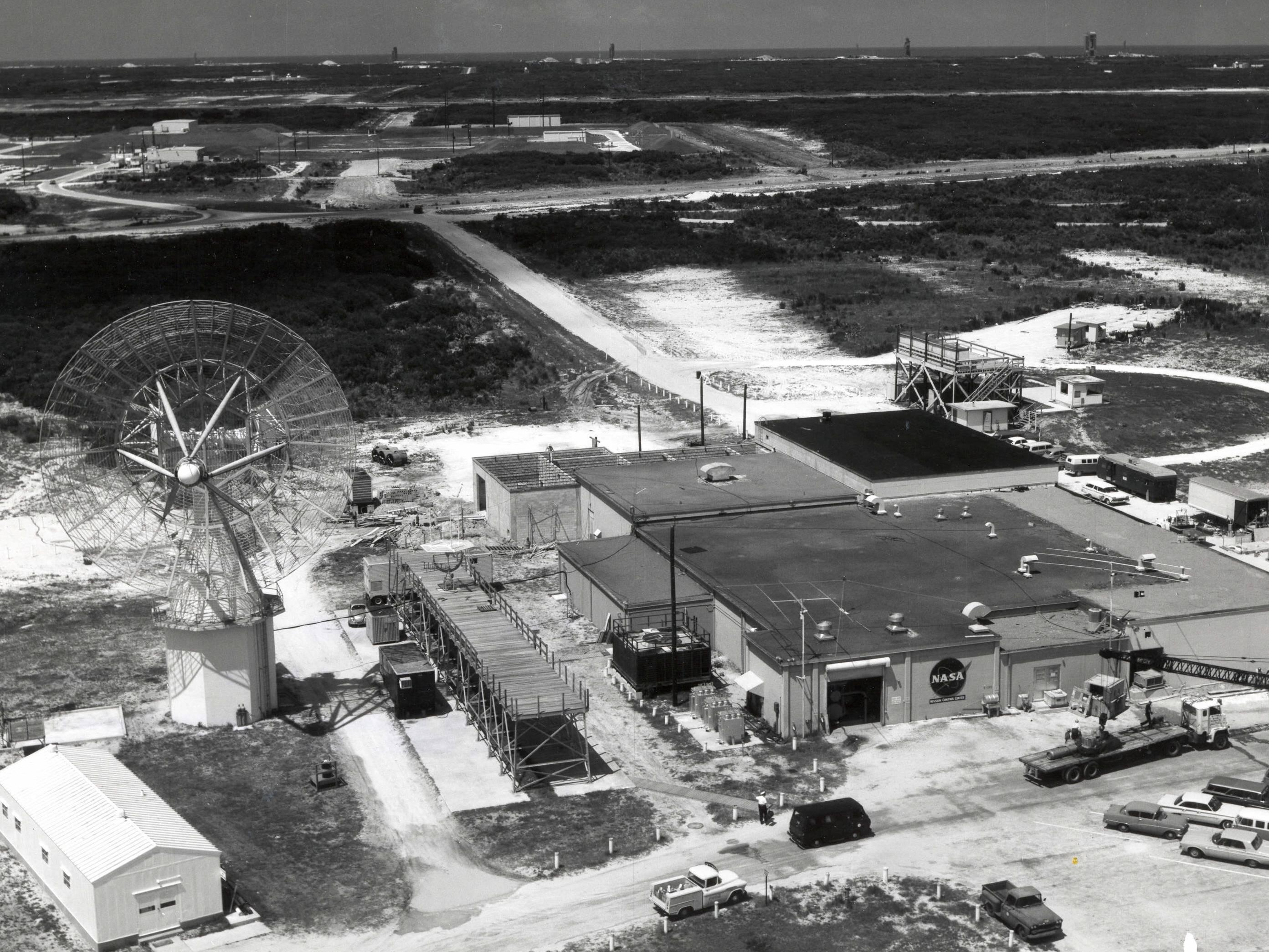
Mercury Control Center, Cape Canaveral, 1963

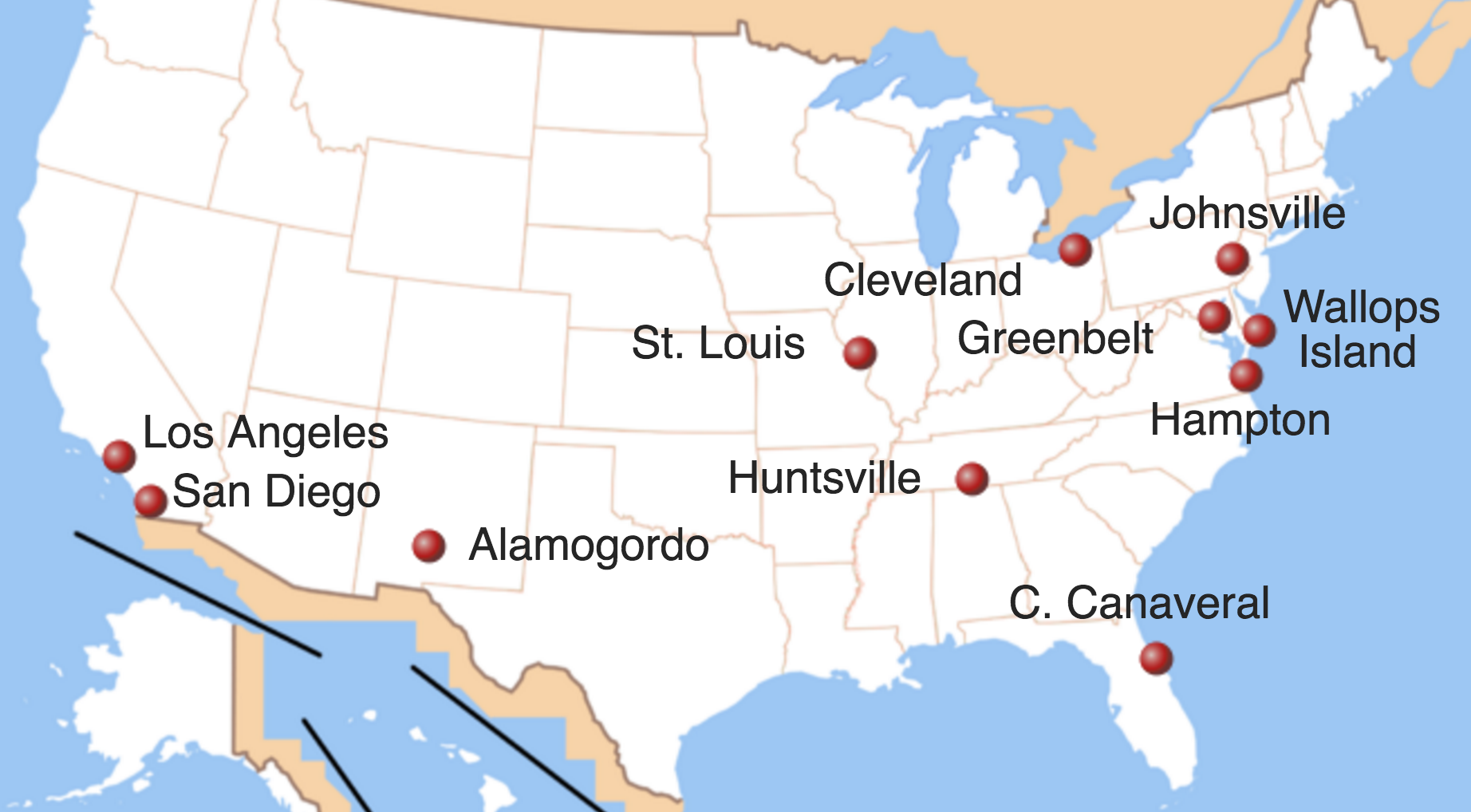
Location of production and operational facilities of Project Mercury

== Spacecraft ==
The Mercury spacecraft's principal designer was Maxime Faget, who started research for human spaceflight during the time of the NACA. It was 10.8 feet (3.3 m) long and 6.0 feet (1.8 m) wide; with the launch escape system added, the overall length was 25.9 feet (7.9 m). With 100 cubic feet (2.8 m^{3}) of habitable volume, the capsule was just large enough for a single crew member. Inside were 120 controls: 55 electrical switches, 30 fuses and 35 mechanical levers. The heaviest spacecraft, Mercury-Atlas 9, weighed 3,000 pounds (1,400 kg) fully loaded. Its outer skin was made of René 41, a nickel alloy able to withstand high temperatures.

The spacecraft was cone shaped, with a neck at the narrow end. It had a convex base, which carried a heat shield (Item 2 in the diagram below) consisting of an aluminum honeycomb covered with multiple layers of fiberglass. Strapped to it was a retropack (1) consisting of three rockets deployed to brake the spacecraft during reentry. Between these were three posigrade rockets: minor rockets for separating the spacecraft from the launch vehicle at orbital insertion. The straps that held the package could be severed when it was no longer needed. Next to the heat shield was the pressurized crew compartment (3). Inside, an astronaut would be strapped to a form-fitting seat with instruments in front of him and with his back to the heat shield. Underneath the seat was the environmental control system supplying oxygen and heat, scrubbing the air of CO_{2}, vapor and odors, and (on orbital flights) collecting urine. The recovery compartment (4) at the narrow end of the spacecraft contained three parachutes: a drogue to stabilize free fall and two main chutes, a primary and reserve. Between the heat shield and inner wall of the crew compartment was a landing skirt, deployed by letting down the heat shield before landing. On top of the recovery compartment was the antenna section (5) containing both antennas for communication and scanners for guiding spacecraft orientation. Attached was a flap used to ensure the spacecraft was faced heat shield first during reentry. A launch escape system (6) was mounted to the narrow end of the spacecraft containing three small solid-fueled rockets which could be fired briefly in a launch failure to separate the capsule safely from its booster. It would deploy the capsule's parachute for a landing nearby at sea. (See also Mission profile for details.)

The Mercury spacecraft did not have an on-board computer, instead relying on all computation for reentry to be calculated by computers on the ground, with their results (retrofire times and firing attitude) then transmitted to the spacecraft by radio while in flight. All computer systems used in the Mercury space program were housed in NASA facilities on Earth. (See ground control for details.)

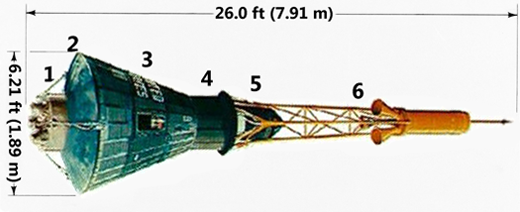
1. Retropack. 2. Heatshield. 3. Crew compartment. 4. Recovery compartment. 5. Antenna section. 6. Launch escape system.

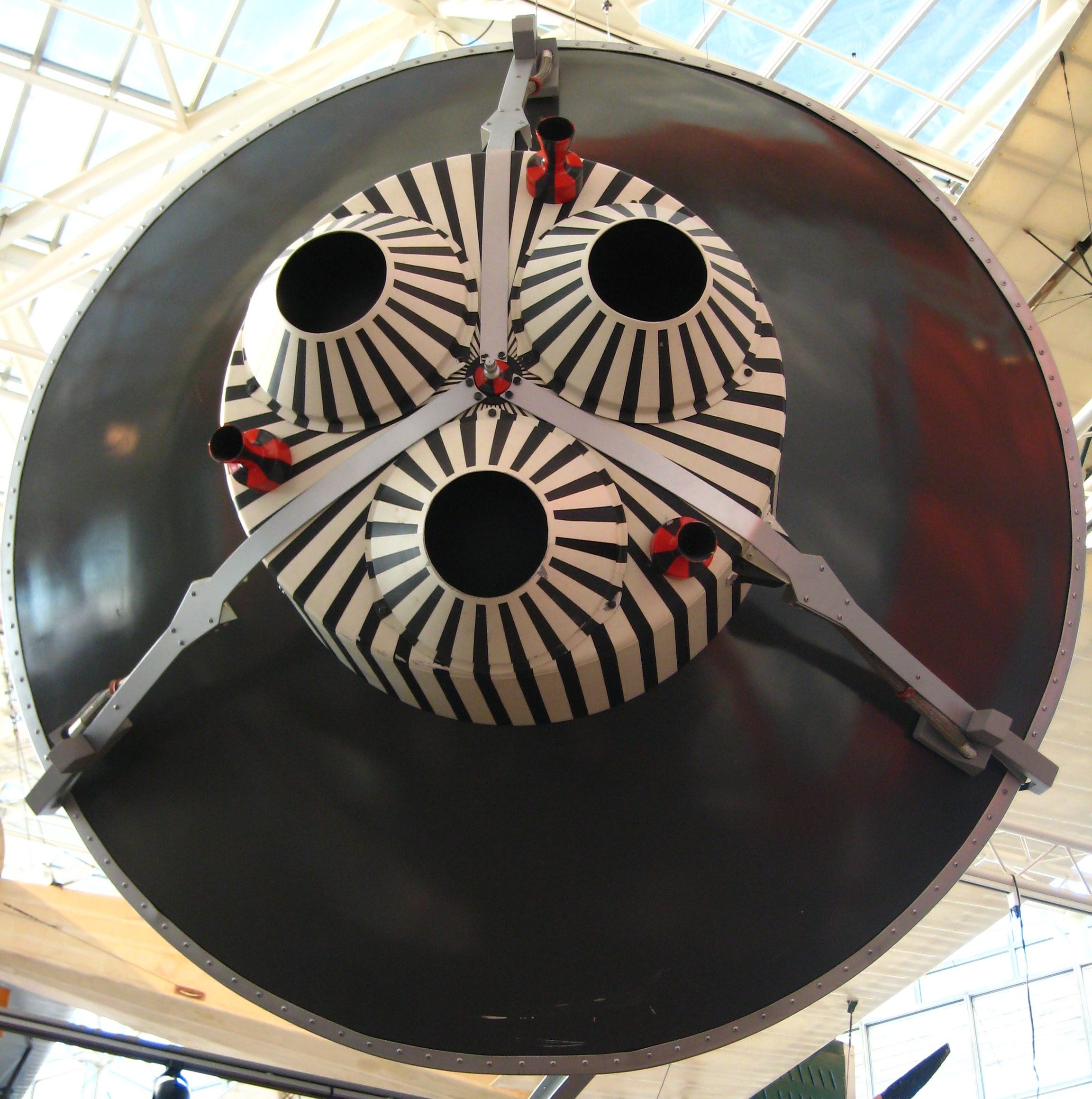
Retropack: Retrorockets with red posigrade rockets

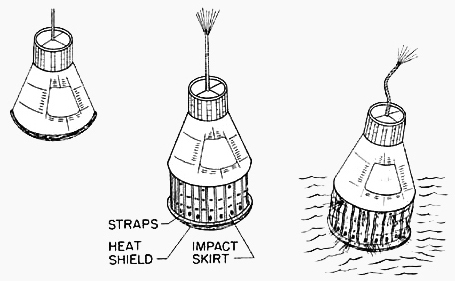
Landing skirt (or bag) deployment: skirt is inflated; on impact the air is pressed out (like an airbag)

=== Pilot accommodations ===
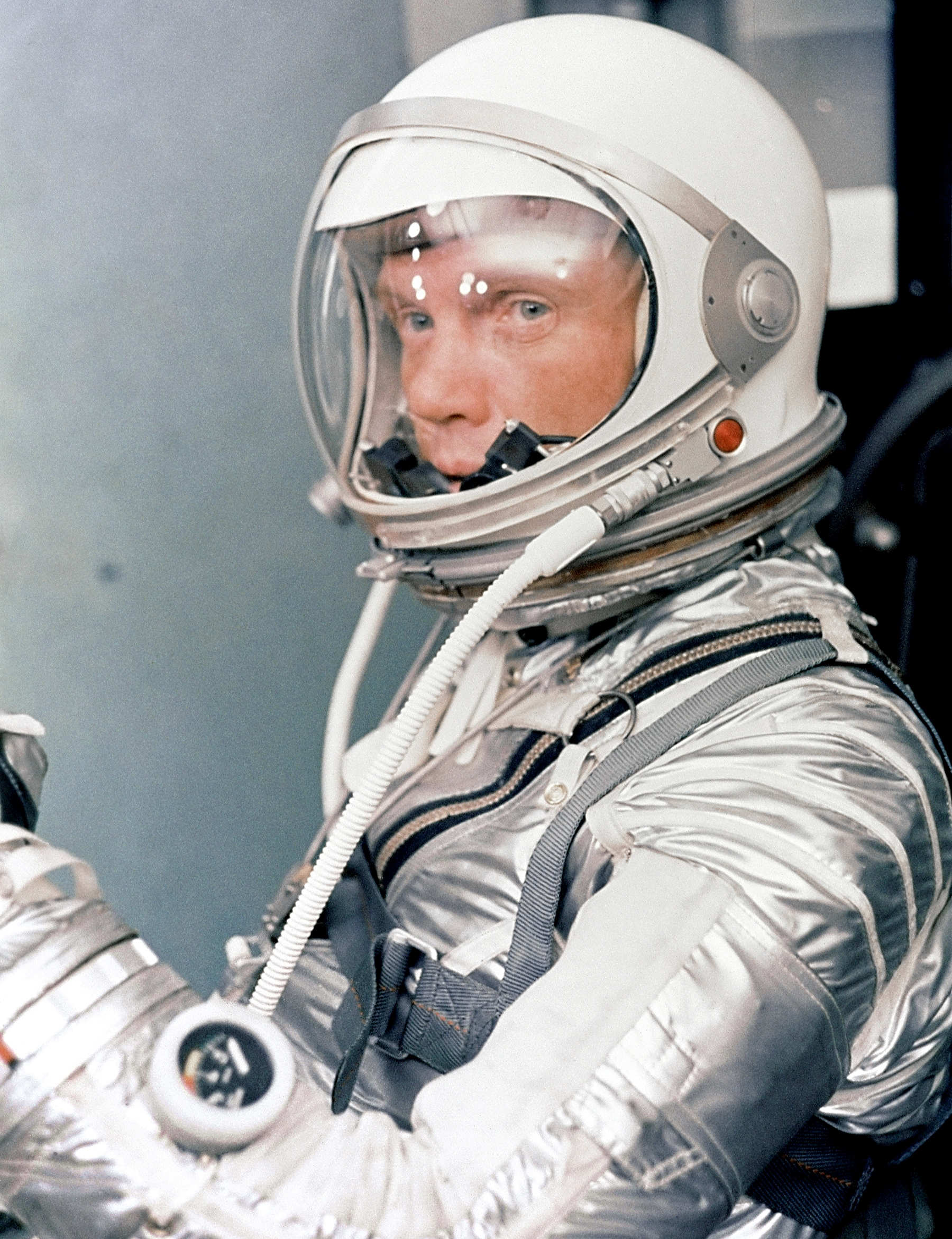
John Glenn wearing his Mercury space suit

The astronaut lay in a sitting position with his back to the heat shield, which was found to be the position that best enabled a human to withstand the high g-forces of launch and reentry. A fiberglass seat was custom-molded from each astronaut's space-suited body for maximum support. Near his left hand was a manual abort handle to activate the launch escape system if necessary prior to or during liftoff, in case the automatic trigger failed.

To supplement the onboard environmental control system, he wore a pressure suit with its own oxygen supply, which would also cool him. A cabin atmosphere of pure oxygen at a low pressure of 5.5 psi or 38 kPa (equivalent to the partial pressure of oxygen at sea level or the pressure of atmospheric air at an altitude of 24,800 feet or 7,600 metres) was chosen, rather than the atmosphere at sea level. This was easier to control, avoided the risk of decompression sickness ("the bends"), (Note: The decision to eliminate the use of any gas but oxygen was crystalized when a serious accident occurred on April 21, 1960, in which McDonnell Aircraft test pilot G.B. North passed out and was seriously injured when testing a Mercury cabin/spacesuit atmosphere system in a vacuum chamber. The problem was found to be nitrogen-rich (oxygen-poor) air leaking from the cabin into his spacesuit feed.) and also saved on spacecraft weight. Fires (which never occurred during the course of Project Mercury) would have to be extinguished by emptying the cabin of oxygen. In such case, or failure of the cabin pressure for any reason, the astronaut could make an emergency return to Earth, relying on his suit for survival. The astronauts normally flew with their visor up, which meant that the suit was not inflated. With the visor down and the suit inflated, the astronaut could only reach the side and bottom panels, where vital buttons and handles were placed.

The astronaut also wore electrodes on his chest to record his heart rhythm, a cuff that could take his blood pressure, and a rectal thermometer to record his temperature (this was replaced by an oral thermometer on the last flight). Data from these was sent to the ground during the flight. (Note: Pilot and spacecraft data sent automatically to the ground is called telemetry.) The astronaut normally drank water and ate food pellets.

Despite the lessons learnt from the U2 program, which also utilized a pressure suit, initially no urine collection device was included for the Mercury astronauts. An inquiry on the subject was made in February 1961 by a student, but NASA responded by stating that "the first space man is not expected to have 'to go". The expected short flight times meant that this was overlooked, although after Alan Shepard had a launch delay of four hours, he was forced to urinate in his suit, short-circuiting some of the electrodes monitoring his vital signs. Gus Grissom wore two rubber pants on the second Mercury flight as a crude workaround. It would take until the third flight in February 1962 before a dedicated urine collection device was installed.

Once in orbit, the spacecraft could be rotated in yaw, pitch, and roll: along its longitudinal axis (roll), left to right from the astronaut's point of view (yaw), and up or down (pitch). Movement was created by rocket-propelled thrusters which used hydrogen peroxide as a fuel. For orientation, the pilot could look through the window in front of him or he could look at a screen connected to a periscope with a camera which could be turned 360°.

The Mercury astronauts had taken part in the development of their spacecraft, and insisted that manual control, and a window, be elements of its design. As a result, spacecraft movement and other functions could be controlled three ways: remotely from the ground when passing over a ground station, automatically guided by onboard instruments, or manually by the astronaut, who could replace or override the two other methods. Experience validated the astronauts' insistence on manual controls. Without them, Gordon Cooper's manual reentry during the last flight would not have been possible.

Cutaways and interior of spacecraft

Spacecraft cutaway

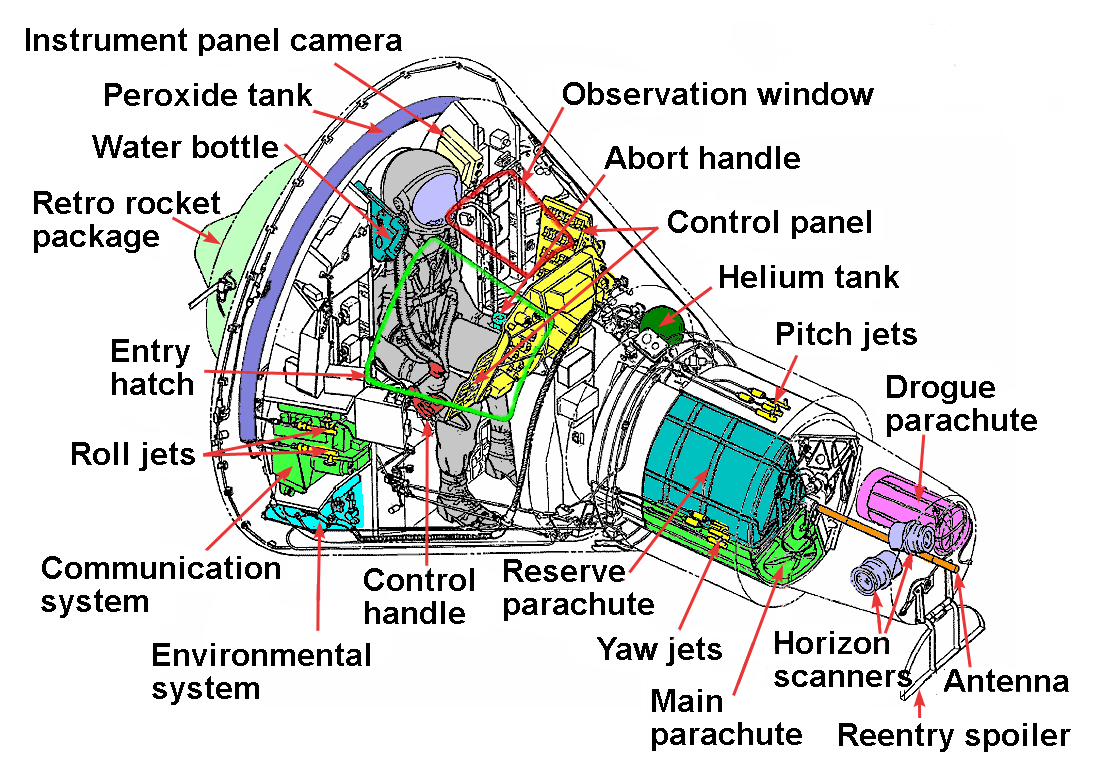
Interior of spacecraft

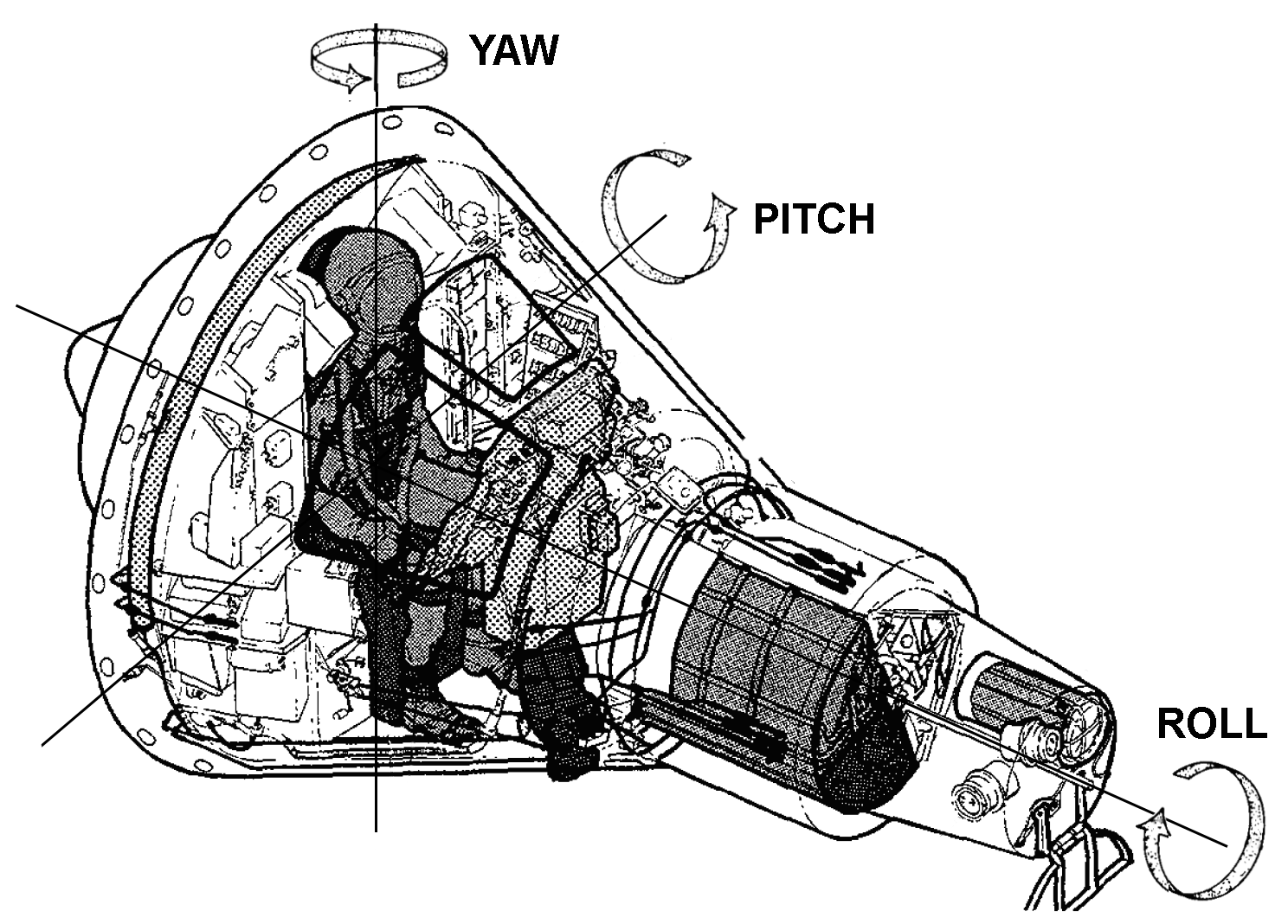
The three axes of rotation for the spacecraft: yaw, pitch and roll

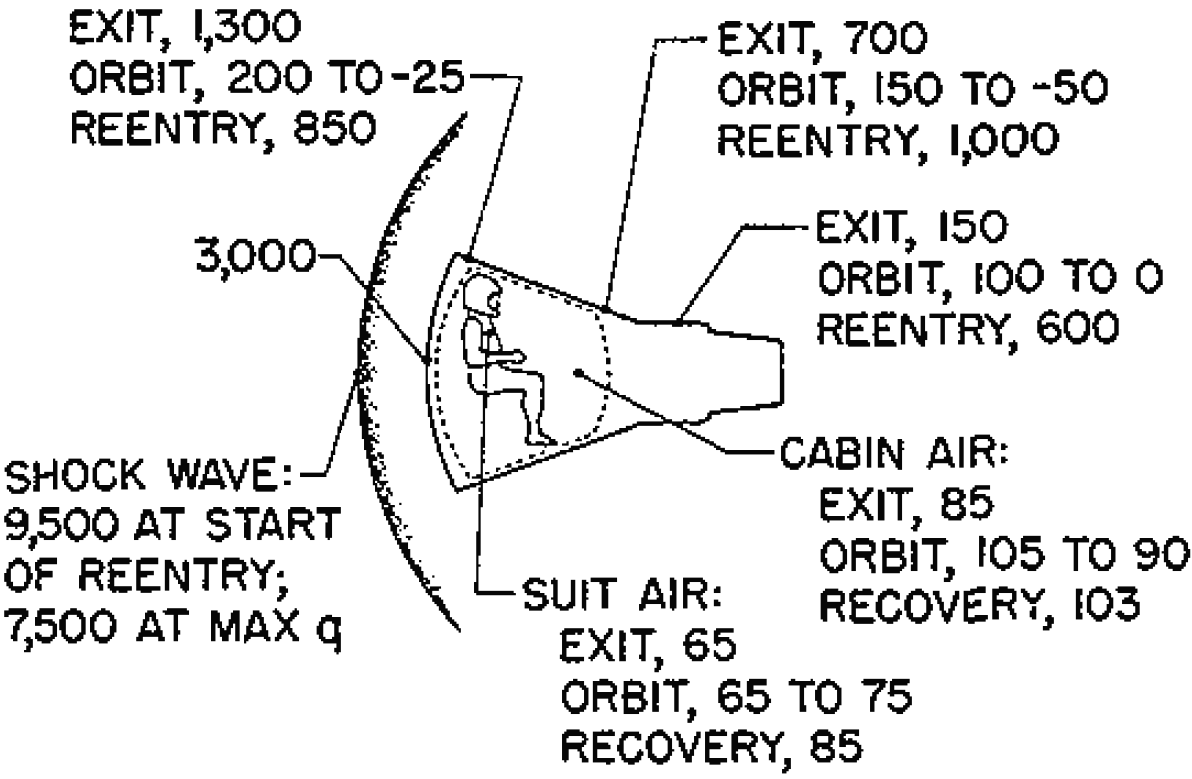
Temperature profile for spacecraft in Fahrenheit

Control panels and handle

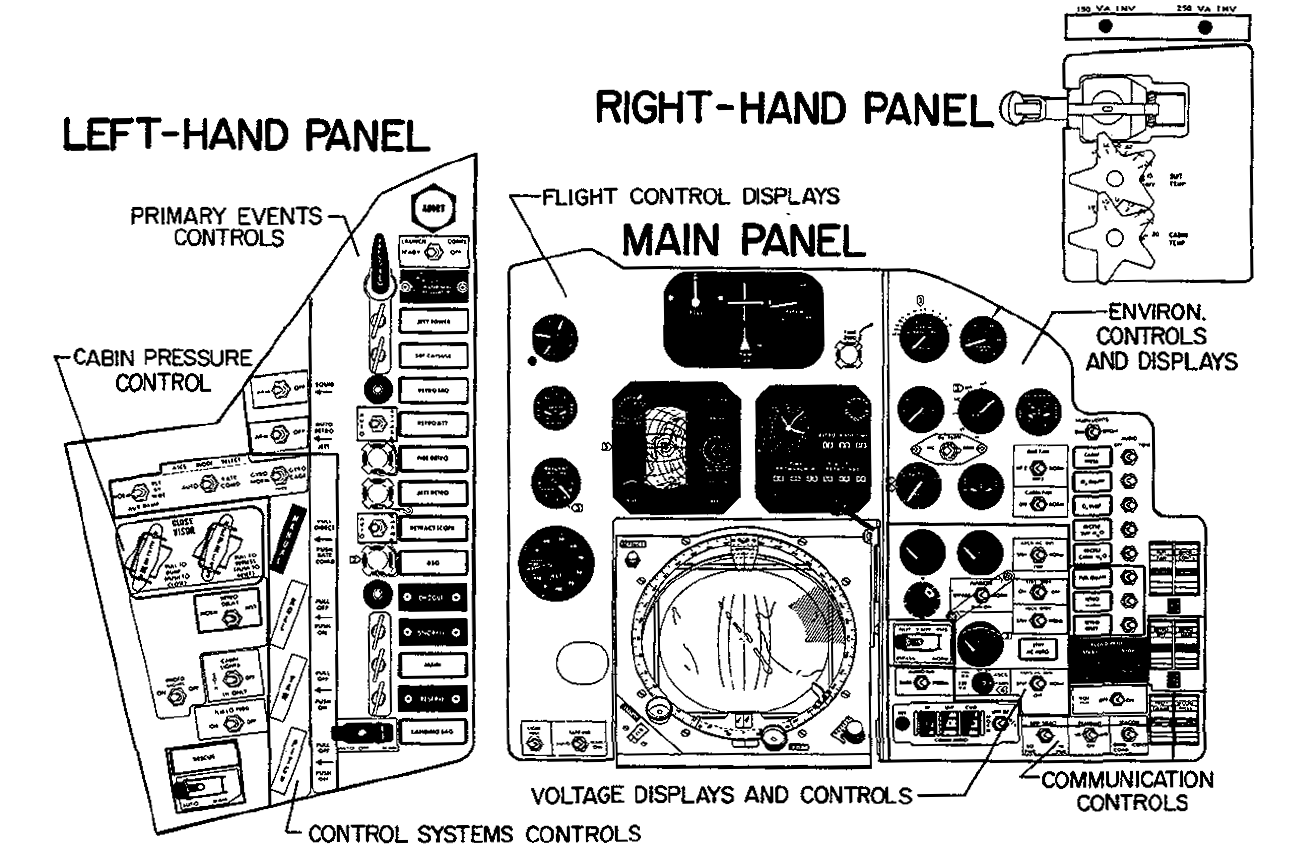
The control panels of Friendship 7. The panels changed between flights, among others the periscope screen that dominates the center of these panels was dropped for the final flight together with the periscope itself.

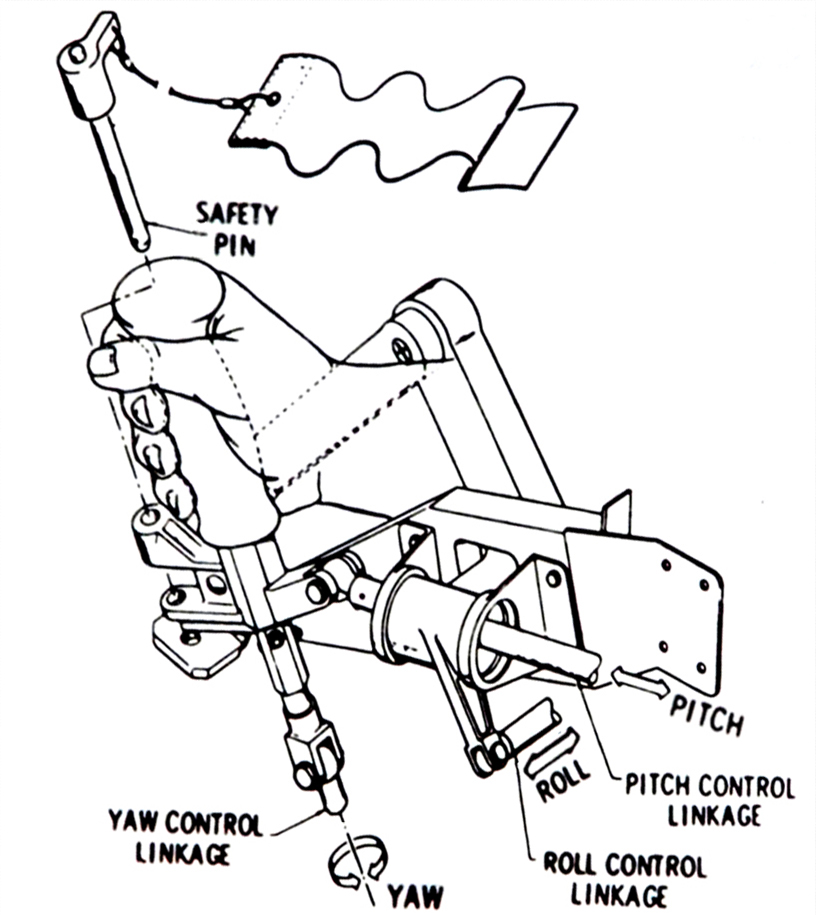
3-axis handle for attitude control

=== Development and production ===
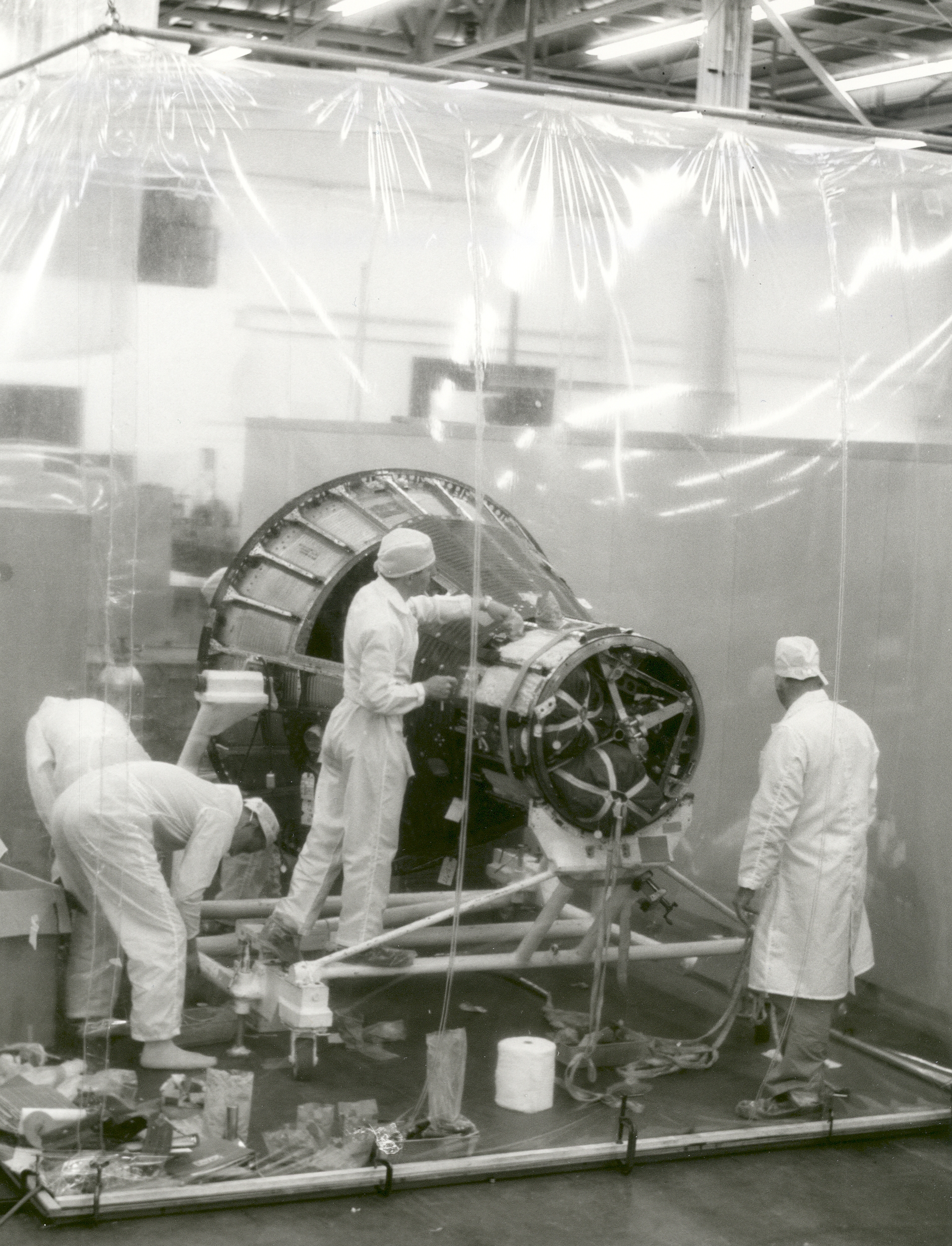
Spacecraft production in clean room at McDonnell Aircraft, St. Louis, 1960

The Mercury spacecraft design was modified three times by NASA between 1958 and 1959. After bidding by potential contractors had been completed, NASA selected the design submitted as "C" in November 1958. After it failed a test flight in July 1959, a final configuration, "D", emerged. The heat shield shape had been developed earlier in the 1950s through experiments with ballistic missiles, which had shown a blunt profile would create a shock wave that would lead most of the heat around the spacecraft. To further protect against heat, either a heat sink, or an ablative material, could be added to the shield. The heat sink would remove heat by the flow of the air inside the shock wave, whereas the ablative heat shield would remove heat by a controlled evaporation of the ablative material. After uncrewed tests, the latter was chosen for crewed flights. Apart from the capsule design, a rocket plane similar to the existing X-15 was considered. This approach was still too far from being able to make a spaceflight, and was consequently dropped. (Note: The rocket plane approach to human space flight was pursued by the Air Force with their Dyna-Soar project, which was canceled in 1963. Toward the end of the 1960s, NASA began the development of a reusable space plane, which was ultimately developed into the Space Shuttle program. The first rocket plane to enter space was an X-15 in 1963.) The heat shield and the stability of the spacecraft were tested in wind tunnels, and later in flight. The launch escape system was developed through uncrewed flights. During a period of problems with development of the landing parachutes, alternative landing systems such as the Rogallo glider wing were considered, but ultimately scrapped.

The spacecraft were produced at McDonnell Aircraft, St. Louis, Missouri, in clean rooms and tested in vacuum chambers at the McDonnell plant. The spacecraft had close to 600 subcontractors, such as Garrett AiResearch which built the spacecraft's environmental control system. Final quality control and preparations of the spacecraft were made at Hangar S at Cape Canaveral. (Note: Test and rework of Mercury-Redstone 2 at the Hangar required 110 days. Hangar S was also the place where the chimpanzees were trained.) NASA ordered 20 production spacecraft, numbered 1 through 20. Five of the 20, Nos. 10, 12, 15, 17, and 19, were not flown. Spacecraft No. 3 and No. 4 were destroyed during uncrewed test flights. Spacecraft No. 11 sank and was recovered from the bottom of the Atlantic Ocean after 38 years. Some spacecraft were modified after initial production (refurbished after launch abort, modified for longer missions, etc.). (Note: They received a letter designation after their number, e.g., 2B, 15B. Some were modified twice: for example, spacecraft 15 became 15A and then 15B.) A number of Mercury boilerplate spacecraft (made from non-flight materials or lacking production spacecraft systems) were also made by NASA and McDonnell. They were designed and used to test spacecraft recovery systems and the escape tower. McDonnell also built the spacecraft simulators used by the astronauts during training, and adopted the motto "First Free Man in Space".

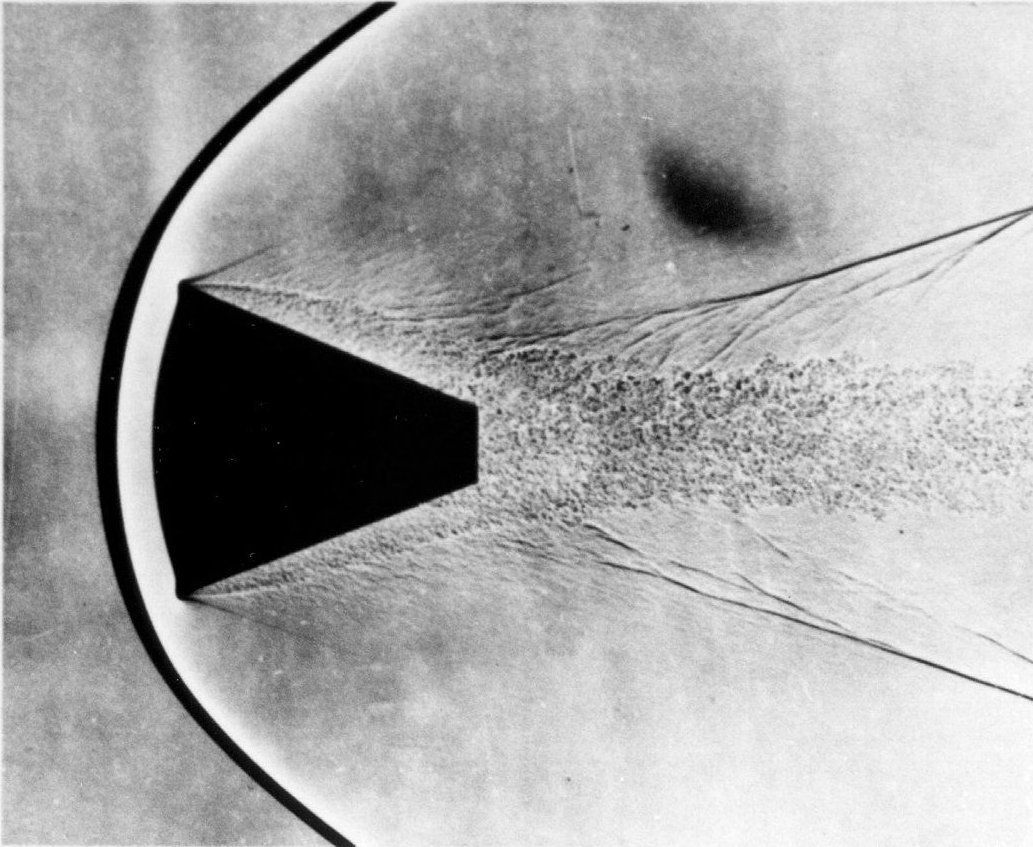
Shadowgraph of the reentry shock wave simulated in a wind tunnel, 1957

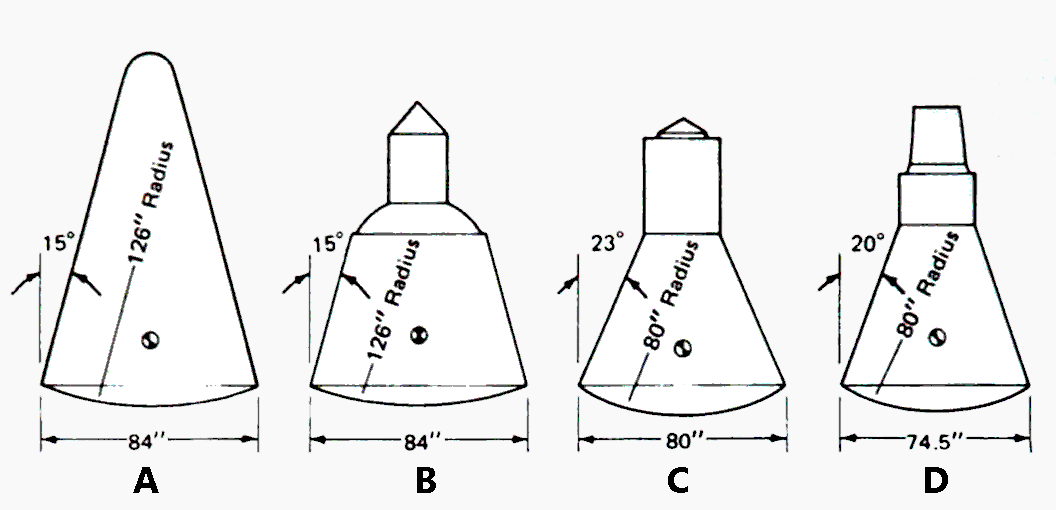
Evolution of capsule design, 1958–59

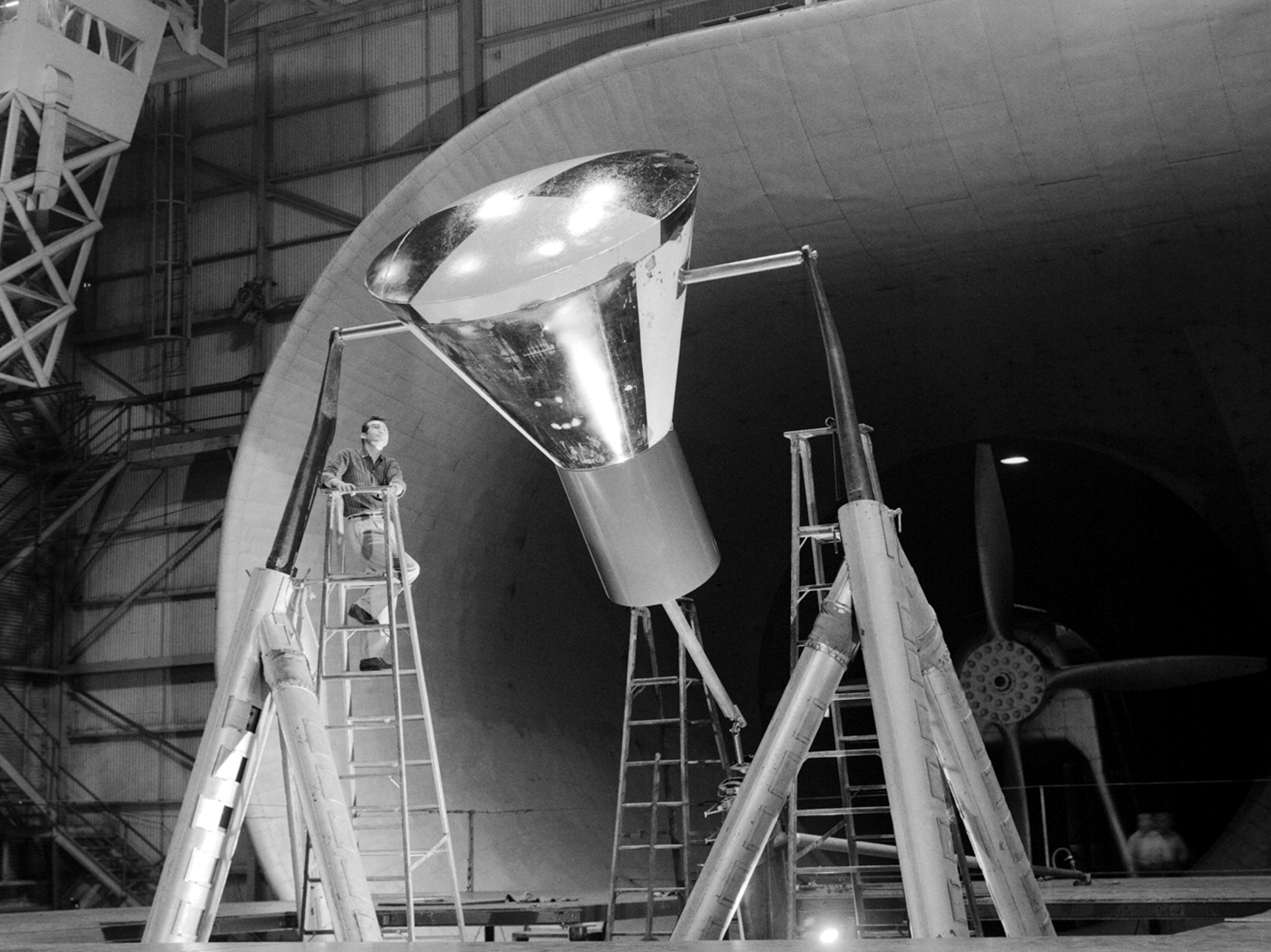
Experiment with boilerplate spacecraft, 1959
Development of Earth landing system
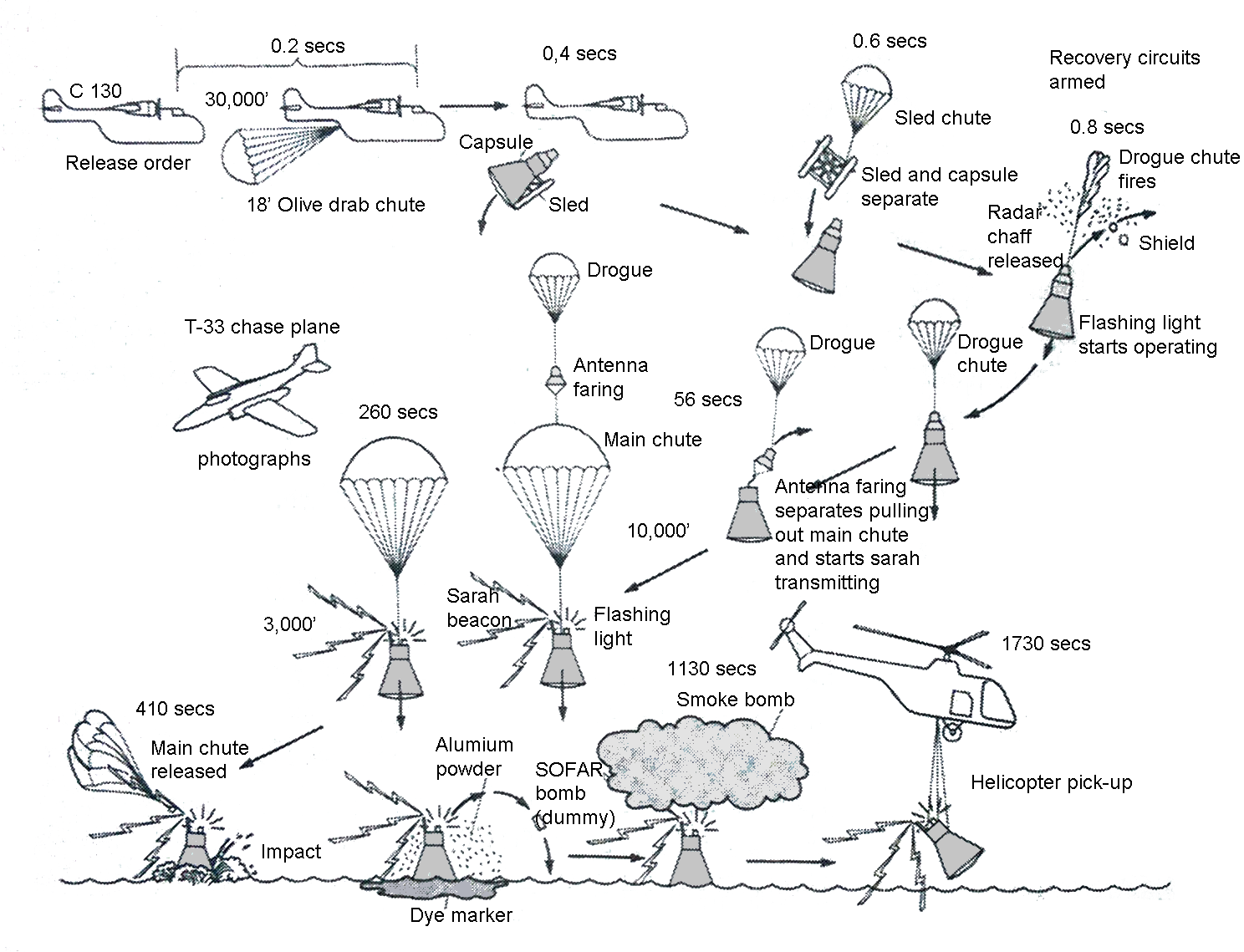
Drop of boilerplate spacecraft in training of landing and recovery. 56 such qualification tests were made together with tests of individual steps of the system.

== Launch vehicles ==
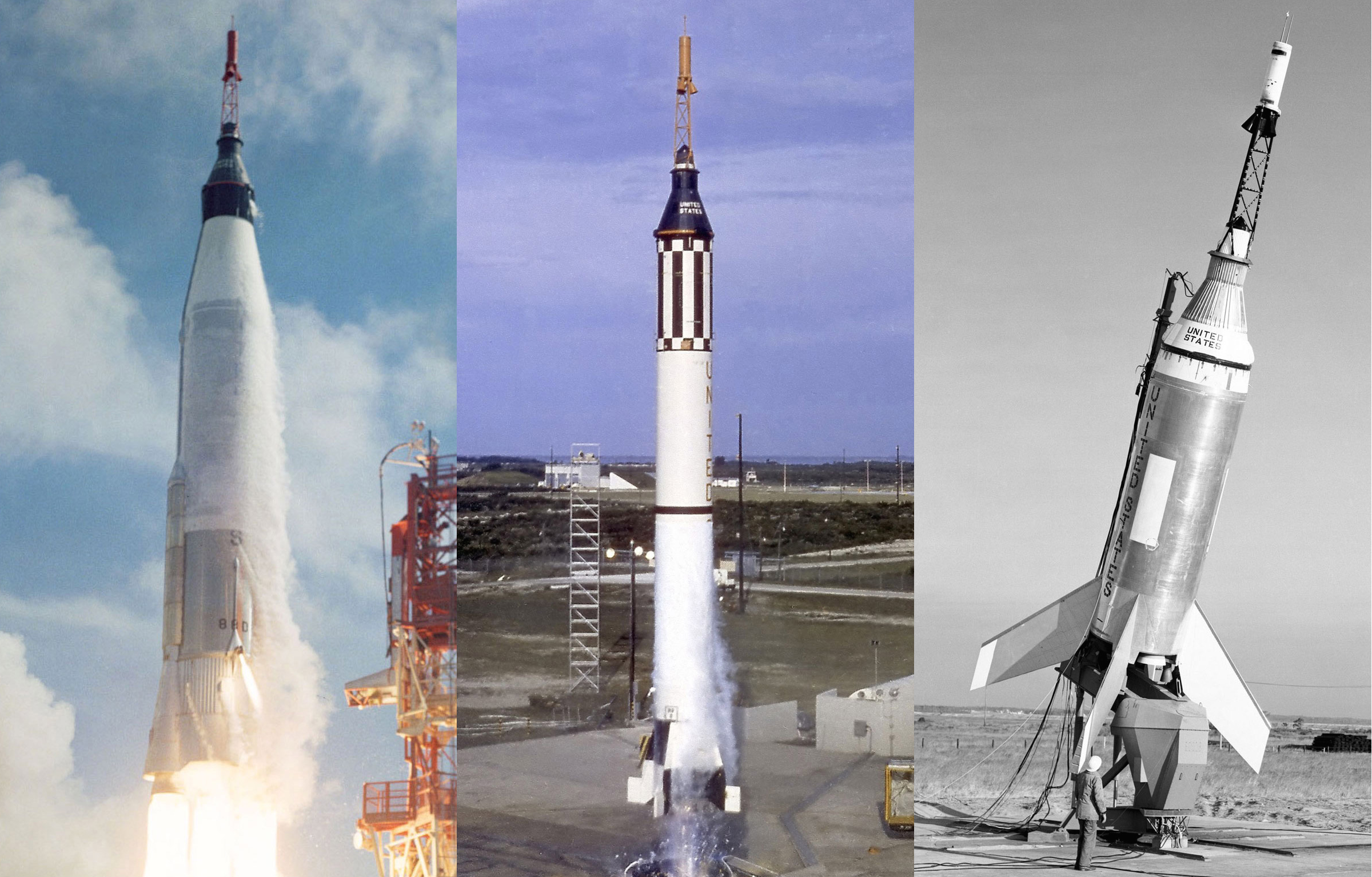
Launch vehicles (in reverse order of their use): 1. Mercury-Atlas (orbital flights). 2. Mercury-Redstone (suborbital flights). 3. Little Joe (uncrewed tests)

=== Launch escape system testing ===
A 55-foot-long (17 m) launch vehicle called Little Joe was used for uncrewed tests of the launch escape system, using a Mercury capsule with an escape tower mounted on it. Its main purpose was to test the system at max q, when aerodynamic forces against the spacecraft peaked, making separation of the launch vehicle and spacecraft most difficult. It was also the point at which the astronaut was subjected to the heaviest vibrations. The Little Joe rocket used solid-fuel propellant and was originally designed in 1958 by NACA for suborbital crewed flights, but was redesigned for Project Mercury to simulate an Atlas-D launch. It was produced by North American Aviation. It was not able to change direction; instead its flight depended on the angle from which it was launched. Its maximum altitude was 100 mi (160 km) fully loaded. A Scout launch vehicle was used for a single flight intended to evaluate the tracking network; however, it failed and was destroyed from the ground shortly after launch.

=== Suborbital flight ===
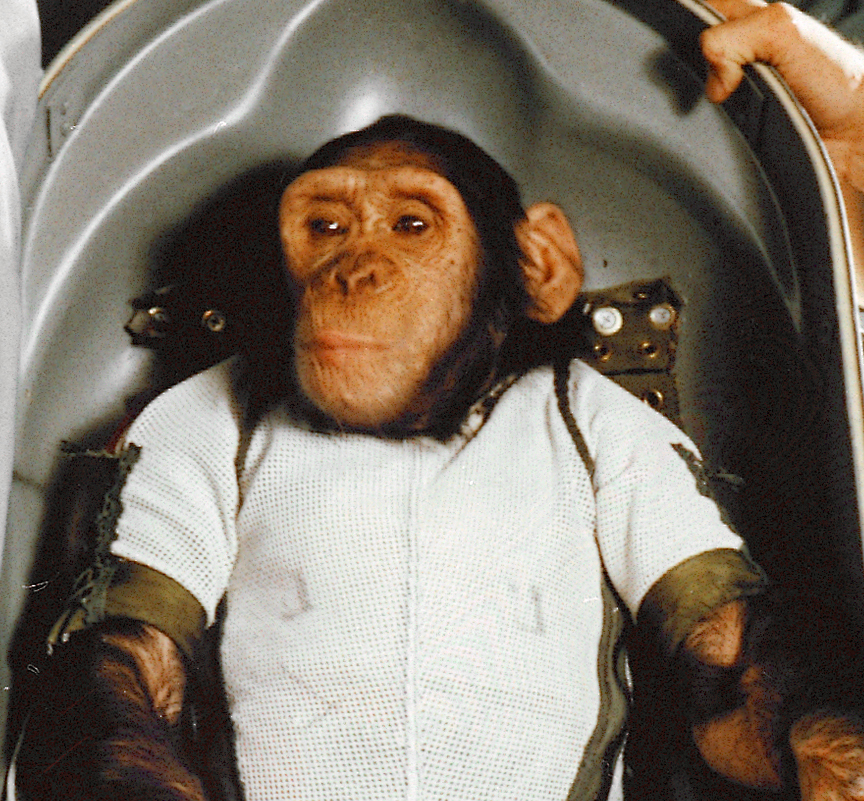
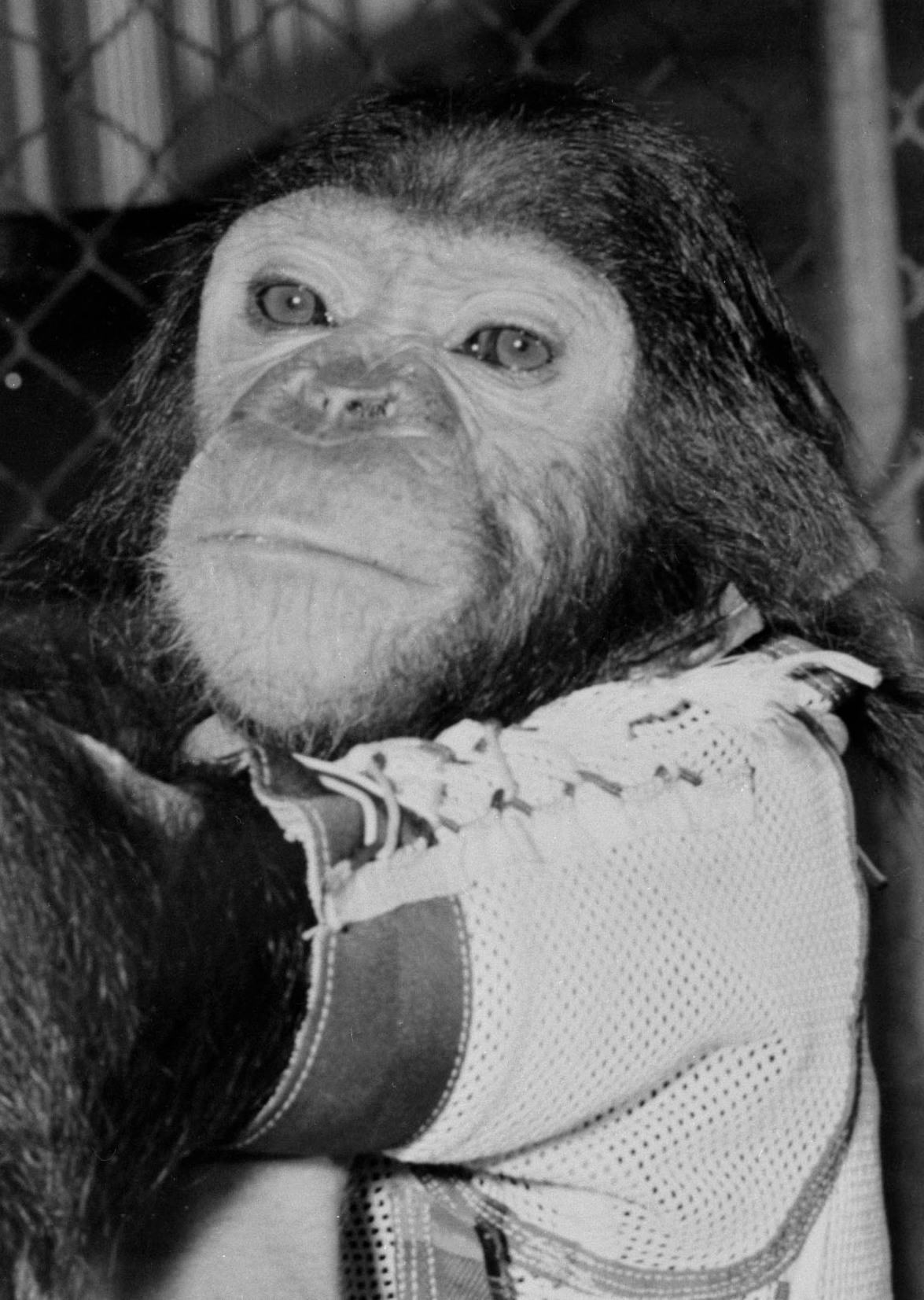
Space pioneers Ham (left), who became the first great ape in space during his January 31, 1961, mission, and Enos, the only chimpanzee and the third primate to orbit the Earth (November 29, 1961), were research subjects in the Project Mercury program.

The Mercury-Redstone Launch Vehicle was an 83-foot-tall (25 m) (with capsule and escape system) single-stage launch vehicle used for suborbital (ballistic) flights. It had a liquid-fueled engine that burned alcohol and liquid oxygen producing about 75,000 pounds-force (330 kN) of thrust, which was not enough for orbital missions. It was a descendant of the German V-2, and developed for the US Army during the early 1950s. It was modified for Project Mercury by removing the warhead and adding a collar for supporting the spacecraft together with material for damping vibrations during launch. Its rocket motor was produced by North American Aviation and its direction could be altered during flight by its fins. They worked by directing the air around them, by directing their thrust, or both at the same time. Both the Atlas-D and Redstone launch vehicles contained an automatic abort sensing system which allowed them to abort a launch by firing the launch escape system if something went wrong. The Jupiter rocket, also developed by Wernher von Braun's team at the Redstone Arsenal in Huntsville, was considered as well for intermediate Mercury suborbital flights at a higher speed and altitude than Redstone, but this plan was dropped when it turned out that man-rating Jupiter for the Mercury program would actually cost more than flying an Atlas due to economics of scale. Beyond its IRBM function, the Jupiter missile was repurposed only for the short-lived Juno II launch vehicle, and sustaining a dedicated technical staff solely for a handful of Mercury capsule launches would have been cost-prohibitive.

=== Orbital flight ===
Orbital missions required use of the Atlas LV-3B, a man-rated version of the Atlas D which was originally developed as the United States' first operational intercontinental ballistic missile (ICBM) by Convair for the Air Force during the mid-1950s. The Atlas was a "one-and-one-half-stage" rocket fueled by kerosene and liquid oxygen (LOX). The rocket by itself stood 67 feet (20 m) high; total height of the Atlas-Mercury space vehicle at launch was 95 feet (29 m).

The Atlas first stage was a booster skirt with two engines burning liquid fuel. (Note: At the time, the word "booster" was sometimes used for the first stage of the launch stack. Later, "booster" came to refer to additional single-stage rockets attached to the sides of the main launch vehicle, as on the Space Shuttle.) This, together with the larger sustainer second stage, gave it sufficient power to launch a Mercury spacecraft into orbit. Both stages fired from lift-off with the thrust from the second stage sustainer engine passing through an opening in the first stage. After separation from the first stage, the sustainer stage continued alone. The sustainer also steered the rocket by thrusters guided by gyroscopes. Smaller vernier rockets were added on its sides for precise control of maneuvers.

=== Gallery ===
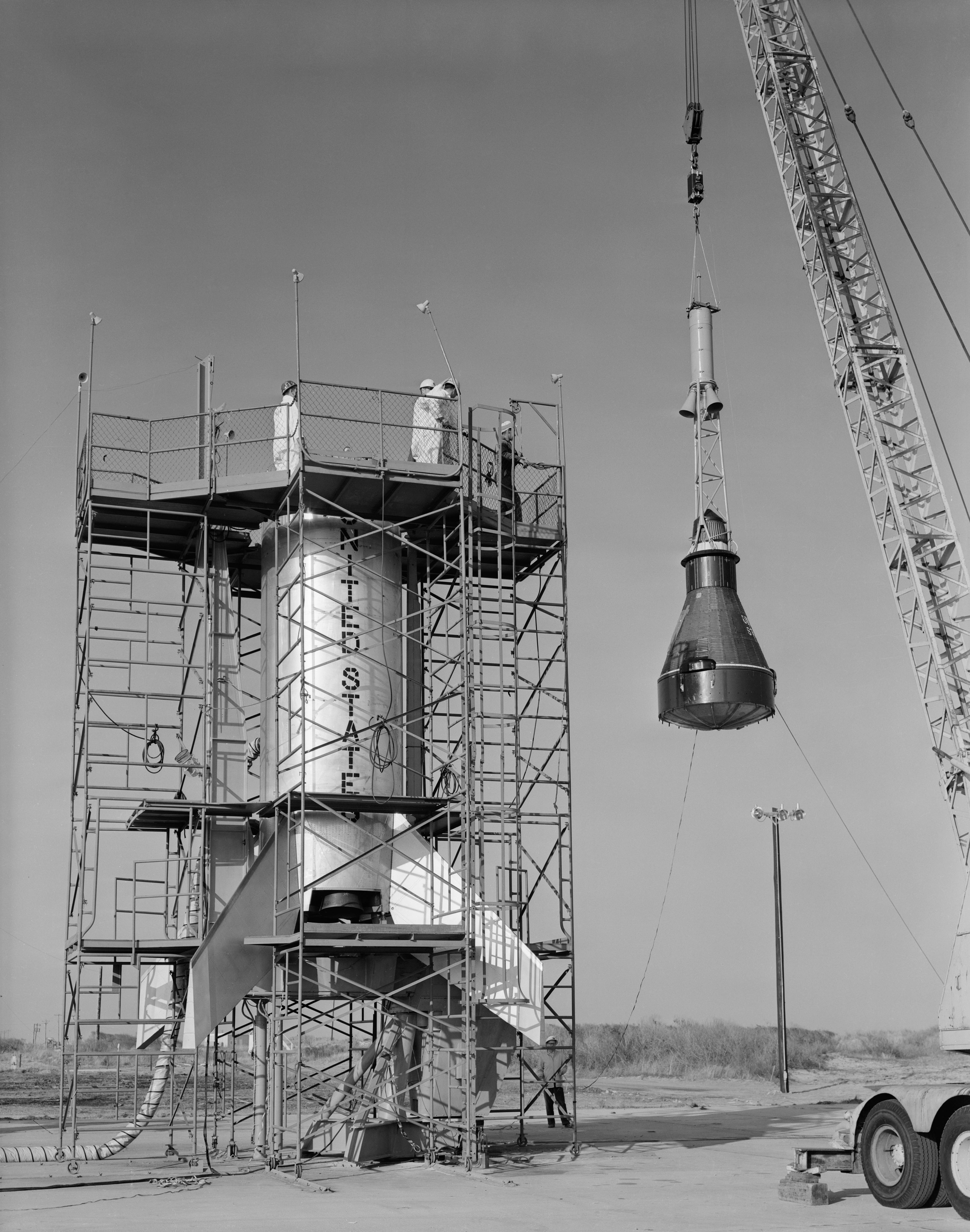
Assembling a Little Joe at Wallops Island

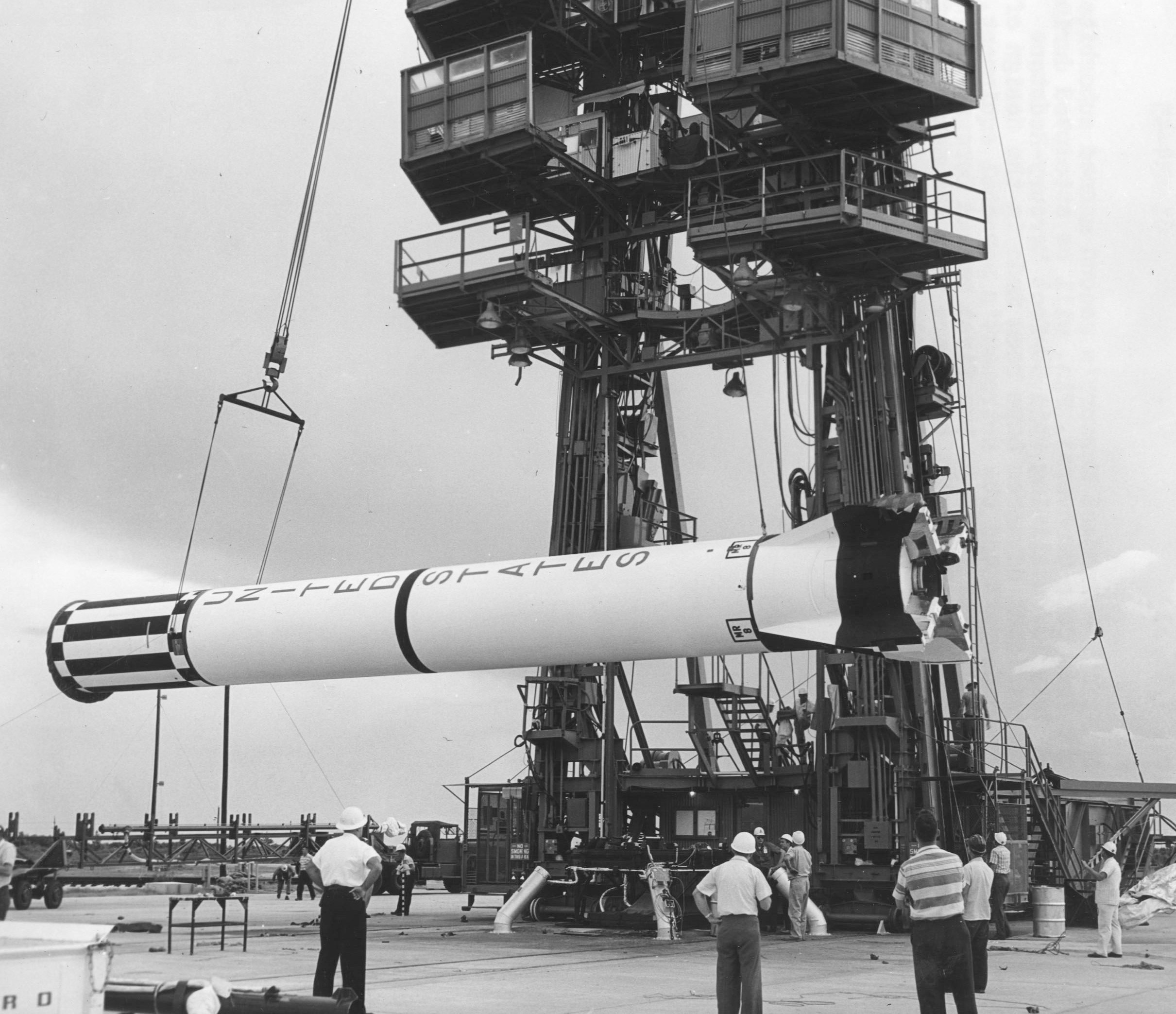
Erection of a Redstone booster at Launch Complex 5

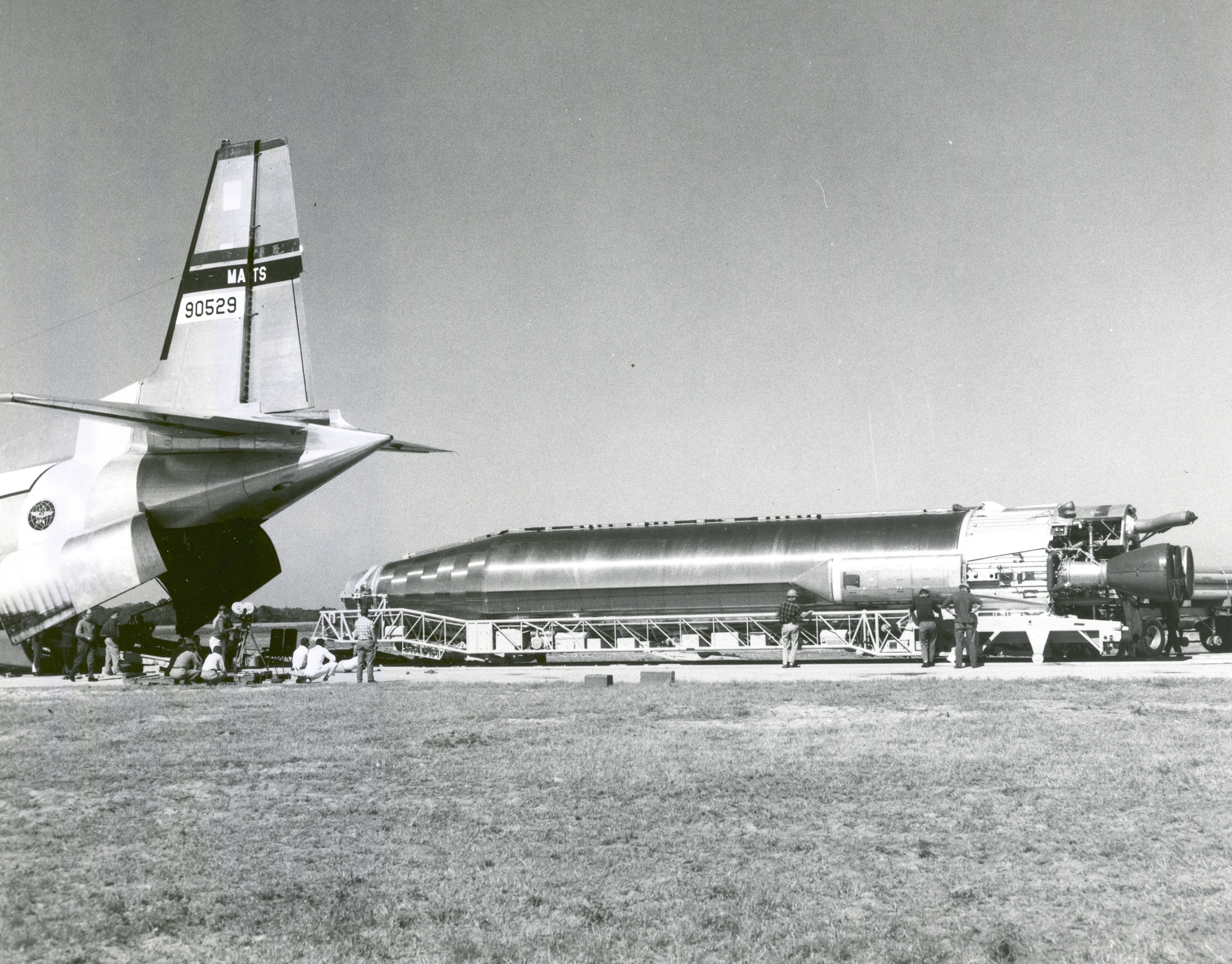
Unloading an Atlas booster at Cape Canaveral

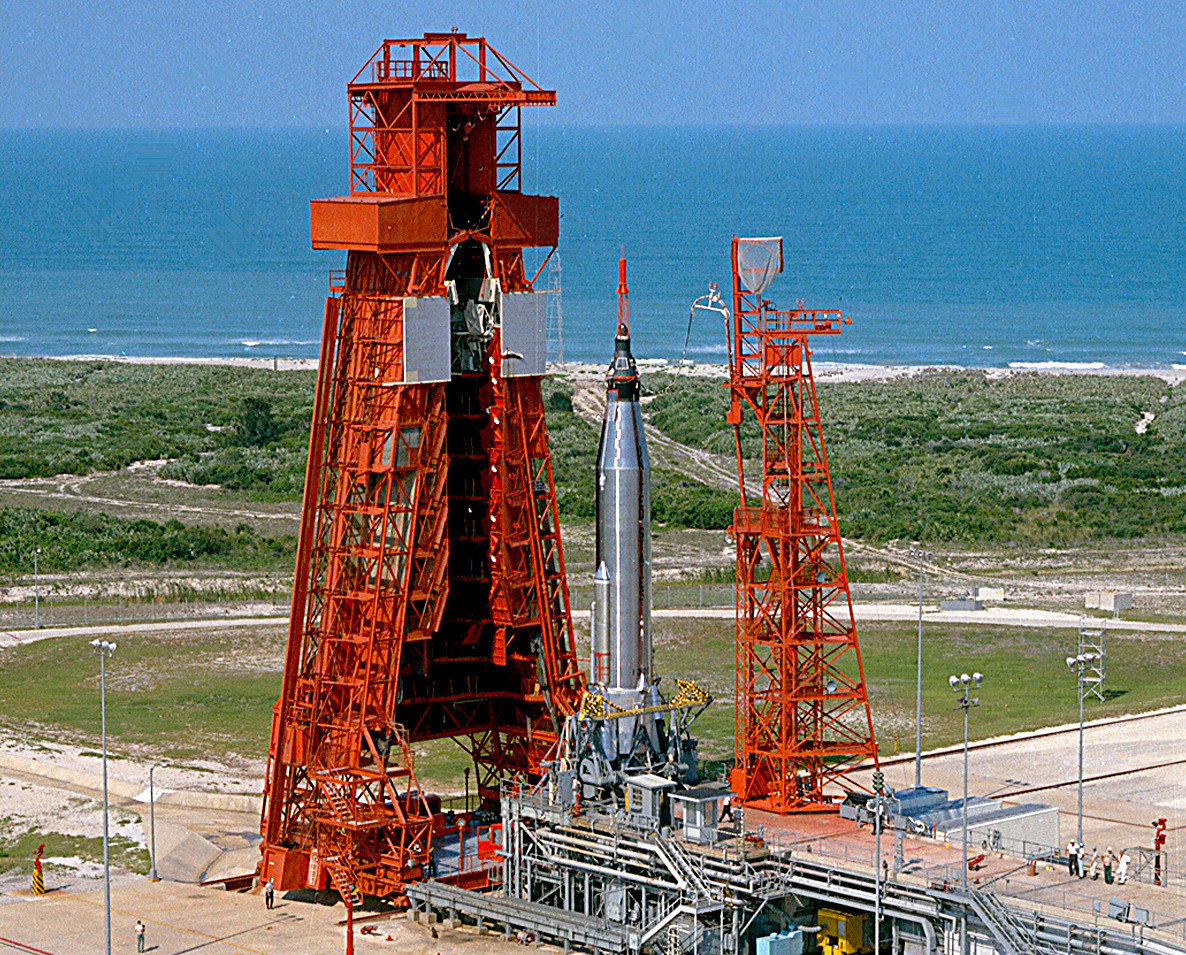
An Atlas booster with spacecraft mounted, on launch pad at Launch Complex 14

== Astronauts ==
NASA announced the following seven astronauts—known as the Mercury Seven—on April 9, 1959:

Name	Launch	Rank	Unit	Born	Died
M. Scott Carpenter	May 24, 1962	Lieutenant	USN	1925	2013
L. Gordon Cooper	May 15, 1963	Captain	USAF	1927	2004
John H. Glenn, Jr.	February 20, 1962	Major	USMC	1921	2016
Virgil I. Grissom	July 21, 1961	Captain	USAF	1926	1967
Walter M. Schirra, Jr.	October 3, 1962	Lt Commander	USN	1923	2007
Alan B. Shepard, Jr.	May 5, 1961	Lt Commander	USN	1923	1998
Donald K. Slayton		Major	USAF	1924	1993

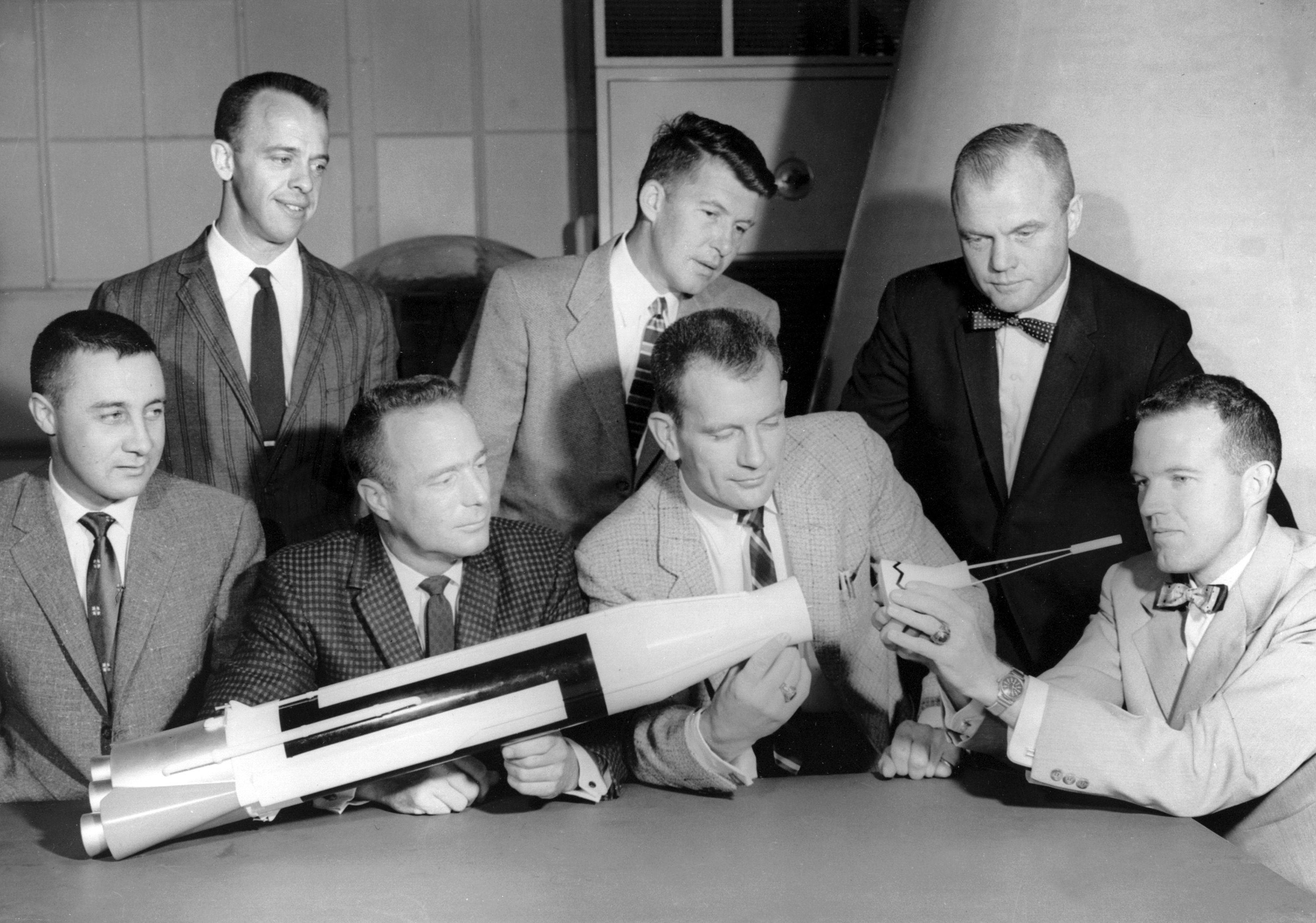
Left to right: Grissom, Shepard, Carpenter, Schirra, Slayton, Glenn and Cooper, 1962

Alan Shepard became the first American in space by making a suborbital flight on May 5, 1961. Mercury-Redstone 3, Shepard's 15 minute and 28 second flight of the Freedom 7 capsule demonstrated the ability to withstand the high g-forces of launch and atmospheric re-entry. Shepard later went on to fly in the Apollo program and became the only Mercury astronaut to walk on the Moon on Apollo 14.

Gus Grissom became the second American in space on Mercury-Redstone 4 on July 21, 1961. After the splashdown of Liberty Bell 7, the side hatch opened and caused the capsule to sink although Grissom was able to be safely recovered. His flight also gave NASA the confidence to move on to orbital flights. Grissom went on to participate in the Gemini and Apollo programs, but died in January 1967 during a pre-launch test for Apollo 1.

John Glenn became the first American to orbit the Earth on Mercury-Atlas 6 February 20, 1962. During the flight, the spacecraft Friendship 7 experienced issues with its automatic control system but Glenn was able to manually control the spacecraft's attitude. He quit NASA in 1964, when he came to the conclusion that he likely would not be selected for any Apollo missions, and was later elected to the US Senate, serving from 1974 to 1999. During his tenure, he returned to space in 1998 as a Payload Specialist aboard STS-95.

Scott Carpenter was the second astronaut in orbit and flew on Mercury-Atlas 7 on May 24, 1962. The spaceflight was essentially a repeat of Mercury-Atlas 6, but a targeting error during re-entry took Aurora 7 250 miles (400 km) off-course, delaying recovery. Afterwards, he joined the Navy's "Man in the Sea" program and is the only American to be both an astronaut and an aquanaut. Carpenter's Mercury flight was his only trip into space.

Wally Schirra flew aboard Sigma 7 on Mercury-Atlas 8 on October 3, 1962. The mission's main goal was to show development of environmental controls or life-support systems that would allow for safety in space, thus being a flight mainly focused on technical evaluation, rather than scientific experimentation. The mission lasted 9 hours and 13 minutes, setting a new US flight duration record. In December 1965, Schirra flew on Gemini 6A, achieving the first ever space rendezvous with sister spacecraft Gemini 7. Three years later, he commanded the first crewed Apollo mission, Apollo 7, becoming the first astronaut to fly three times and the only person to fly in the Mercury, Gemini, and Apollo programs.

Gordon Cooper made the last flight of Project Mercury with Mercury-Atlas 9 on May 15, 1963. His flight onboard Faith 7 set another US endurance record with a 34-hour and 19 minute flight duration, and 22 completed orbits. This mission marks the last time an American was launched alone to conduct an entirely solo orbital mission. Cooper later went on to participate in Project Gemini where he once again beat the endurance record during Gemini 5.

Deke Slayton was grounded in 1962 due to a heart condition, but remained with NASA and was appointed senior manager of the Astronaut Office and later additionally assistant director of Flight Crew Operations at the beginning of Project Gemini. On March 13, 1972, after doctors confirmed he no longer had a coronary condition, Slayton returned to flight status and the next year was assigned to the Apollo–Soyuz Test Project, which successfully flew in 1975 with Slayton as the docking module pilot. After the ASTP, he managed the Space Shuttle Program's Approach and Landing Tests (ALT) and Orbital Flight Tests (OFT) before retiring from NASA in 1982.

One of the astronauts' tasks was publicity; they gave interviews to the press and visited project manufacturing facilities to speak with those who worked on Project Mercury. The press was especially fond of John Glenn, who was considered the best speaker of the seven. They sold their personal stories to Life magazine which portrayed them as 'patriotic, God-fearing family men.' Life was also allowed to be at home with the families while the astronauts were in space. During the project, Grissom, Carpenter, Cooper, Schirra and Slayton stayed with their families at or near Langley Air Force Base; Glenn lived at the base and visited his family in Washington DC on weekends. Shepard lived with his family at Naval Air Station Oceana in Virginia.

Other than Grissom, who was killed in the 1967 Apollo 1 fire, the other six survived past retirement and died between 1993 and 2016.

Astronauts' assignments
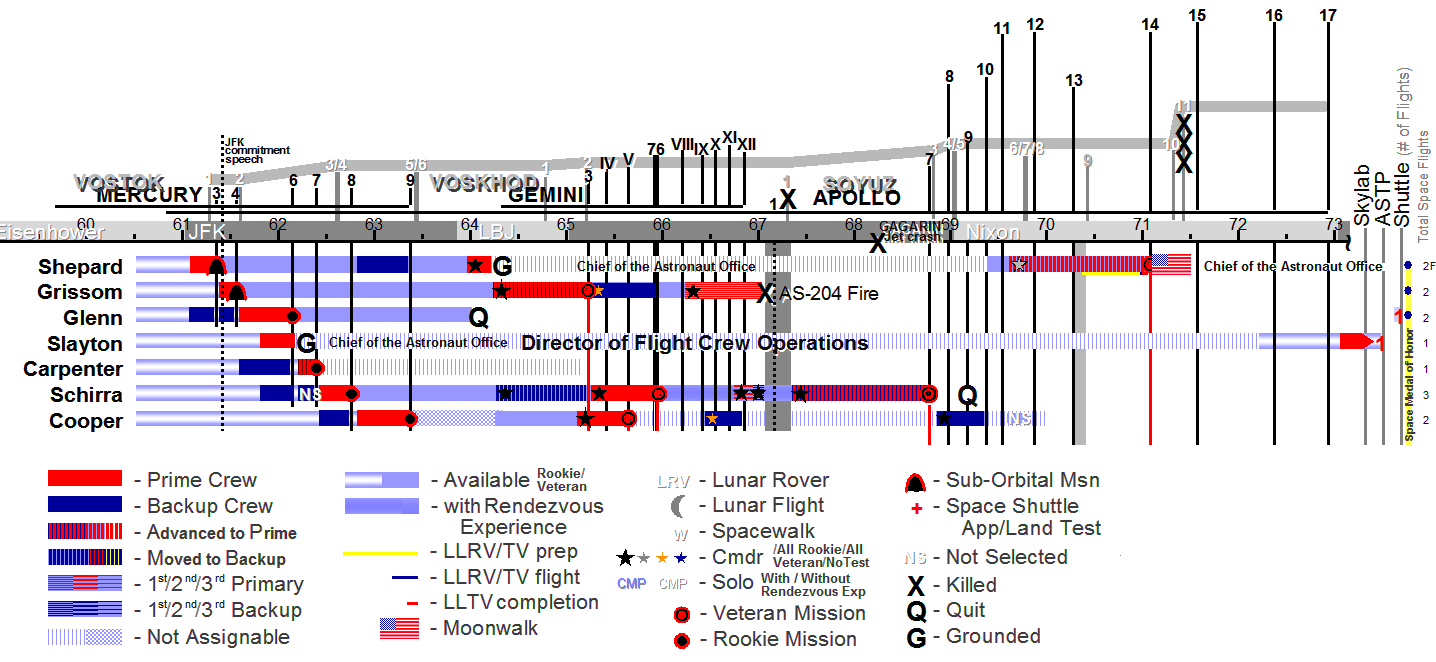
Mercury 7 astronaut assignments. Schirra had the most flights with three; Glenn, though being the first to leave NASA, had the last with a Space Shuttle mission in 1998. Shepard was the only one to walk on the Moon.

=== Selection and training ===
Prior to Project Mercury, there was no protocol for selecting astronauts, so NASA would set a far-reaching precedent with both their selection process and initial choices for astronauts. At the end of 1958, various ideas for the selection pool were discussed privately within the national government and the civilian space program, and also among the public at large. Initially, there was the idea to issue a widespread public call to volunteers. Thrill-seekers such as rock climbers and acrobats would have been allowed to apply, but this idea was quickly shot down by NASA officials who understood that an undertaking such as space flight required individuals with professional training and education in flight engineering. By late 1958, NASA officials decided to move forward with test pilots being the heart of their selection pool. On President Eisenhower's insistence, the group was further narrowed down to active duty military test pilots, which set the number of candidates at 508. These candidates were USN or USMC naval aviation pilots (NAPs), or USAF pilots of Senior or Command rating. These aviators had long military records, which would give NASA officials more background information on which to base their decisions. Furthermore, these aviators were skilled in flying the most advanced aircraft to date, giving them the best qualifications for the new position of astronaut. During this time, women were banned from flying in the military and so could not successfully qualify as test pilots. This meant that no female candidates could earn consideration for the title of astronaut. Civilian NASA X-15 pilot Neil Armstrong was also disqualified, though he had been selected by the US Air Force in 1958 for its Man in Space Soonest program, which was replaced by Mercury. Although Armstrong had been a combat-experienced NAP during the Korean War, he left active duty in 1952. (Note: Armstrong left the Navy as a Lieutenant, Junior Grade in the US Naval Reserve, until resigning his commission 1960.) Armstrong became NASA's first civilian astronaut in 1962 when he was selected for NASA's second group, and became the first man on the Moon in 1969.

It was further stipulated that candidates should be between 25 and 40 years old, no taller than 5 ft 11 in (1.80 m), and hold a college degree in a STEM subject. The college degree requirement excluded the USAF's X-1 pilot, then-Lt Col (later Brig Gen) Chuck Yeager, the first person to exceed the speed of sound. He later became a critic of the project, ridiculing the civilian space program, labeling astronauts as "spam in a can." John Glenn did not have a college degree either, but used influential friends to make the selection committee accept him. USAF Capt. (later Col.) Joseph Kittinger, a USAF fighter pilot and stratosphere balloonist, met all the requirements but preferred to stay in his contemporary project. Other potential candidates declined because they did not believe that human spaceflight had a future beyond Project Mercury. (Note: At the beginning of the project both President Eisenhower and NASA's first administrator, T. K. Glennan, believed that the US would put the first man in space, and that this would be the end of the Space Race.) From the original 508, 110 candidates were selected for an interview, and from the interviews, 32 were selected for further physical and mental testing. Their health, vision, and hearing were examined, together with their tolerance to noise, vibrations, g-forces, personal isolation, and heat. In a special chamber, they were tested to see if they could perform their tasks under confusing conditions. The candidates had to answer more than 500 questions about themselves and describe what they saw in different images. Navy Lt (later Capt) Jim Lovell, who was later an astronaut in the Gemini and Apollo programs, did not pass the physical tests. After these tests it was intended to narrow the group down to six astronauts, but in the end it was decided to keep seven.

The astronauts went through a training program covering some of the same exercises that were used in their selection. They simulated the g-force profiles of launch and reentry in a centrifuge at the Naval Air Development Center, and were taught special breathing techniques necessary when subjected to more than 6 g. Weightlessness training took place in aircraft, first on the rear seat of a two-seater fighter and later inside converted and padded cargo aircraft. They practiced gaining control of a spinning spacecraft in a machine at the Lewis Flight Propulsion Laboratory called the Multi-Axis Spin-Test Inertia Facility (MASTIF), by using an attitude controller handle simulating the one in the spacecraft. A further measure for finding the right attitude in orbit was star and Earth recognition training in planetaria and simulators. Communication and flight procedures were practiced in flight simulators, first together with a single person assisting them and later with the Mission Control Center. Recovery was practiced in pools at Langley, and later at sea with frogmen and helicopter crews.

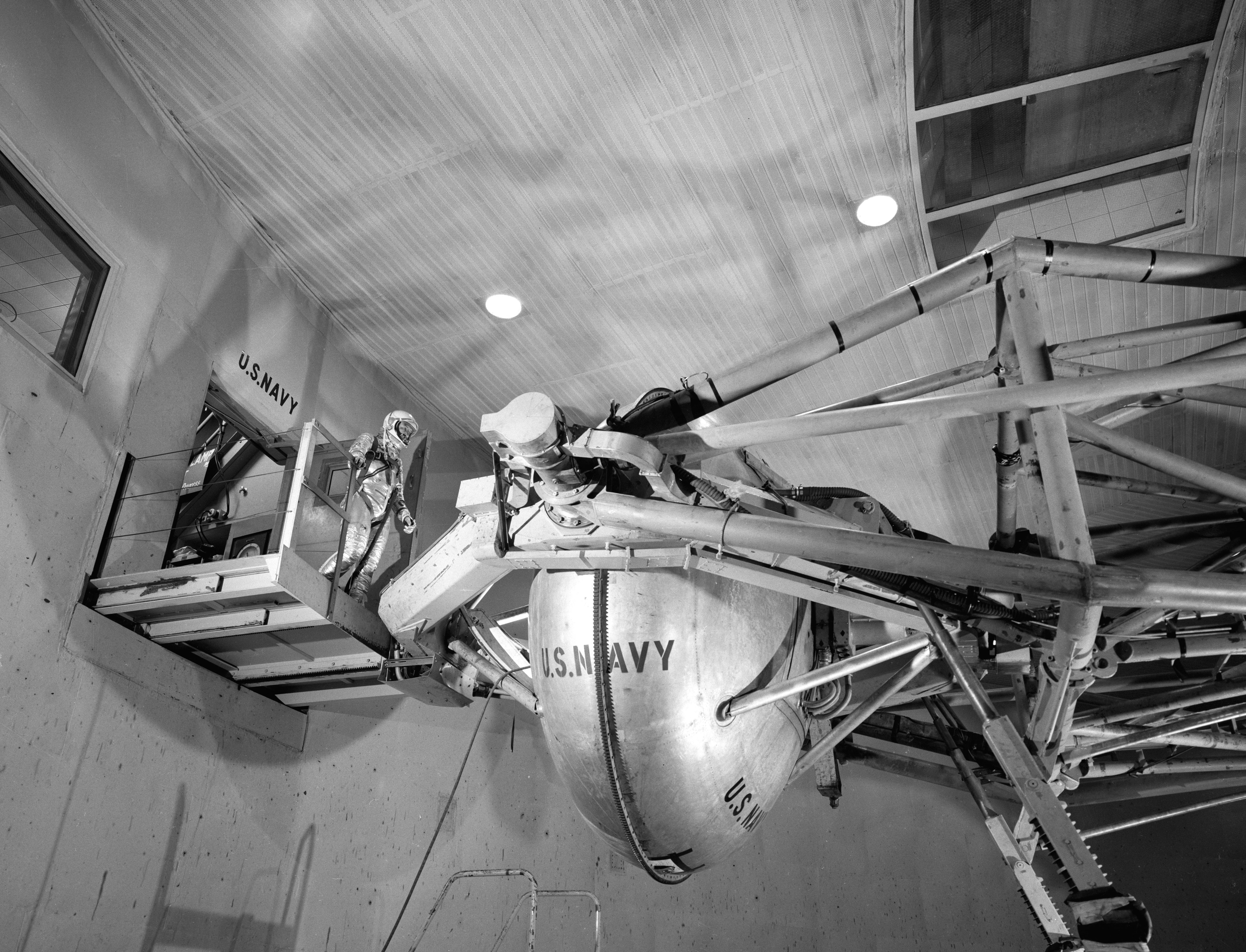
G-force training, Johnsville, 1960

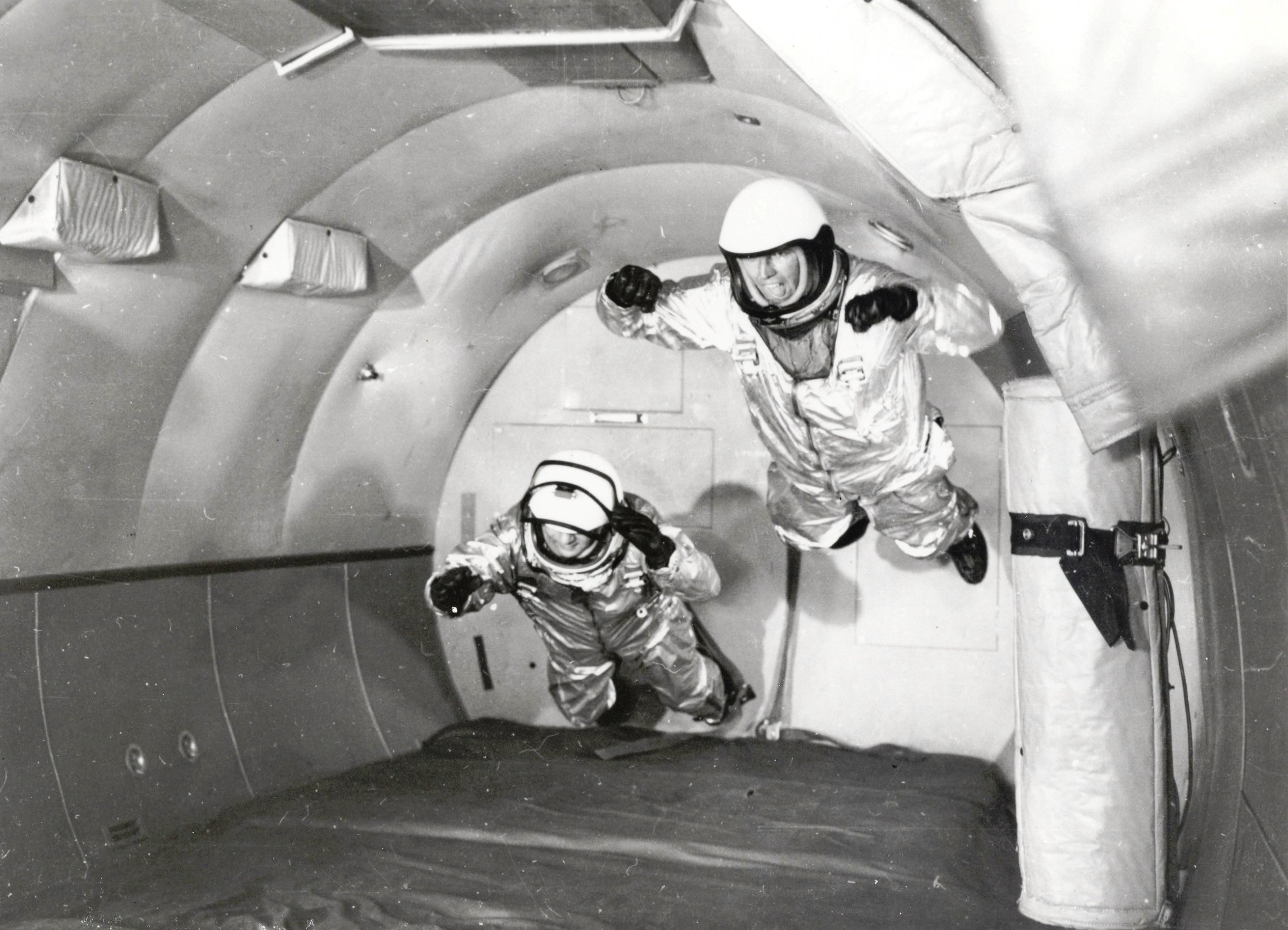
Weightlessness simulation in a C-131

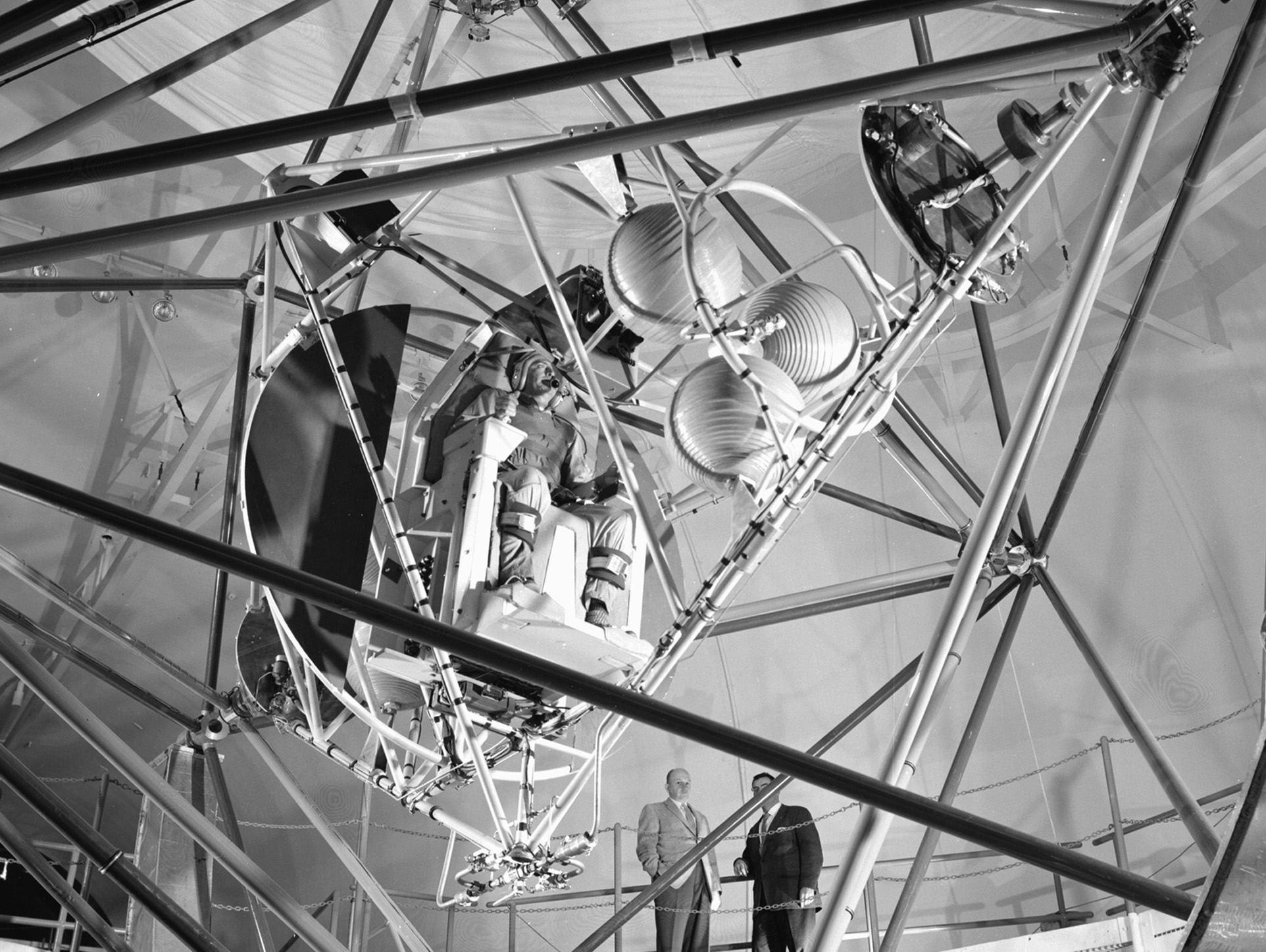
MASTIF at Lewis Research Center

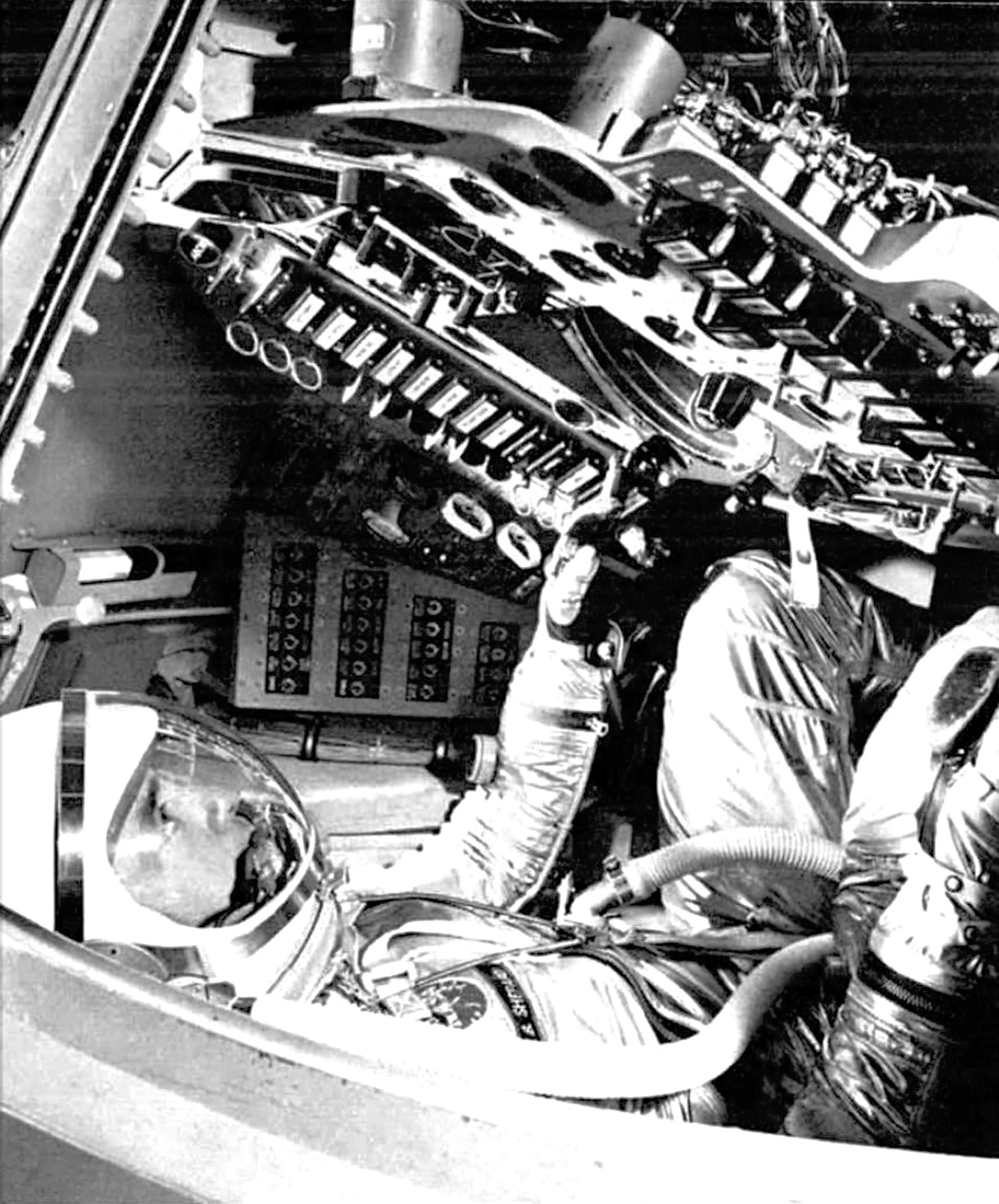
Flight trainer at Cape Canaveral

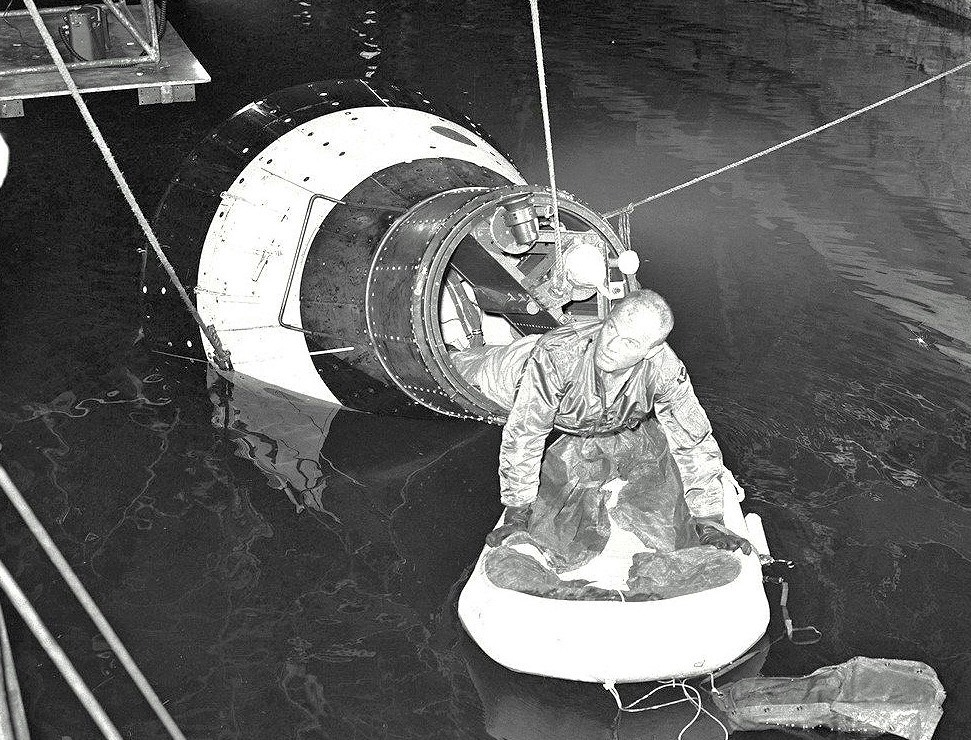
Egress training at Langley

== Mission profile ==
=== Suborbital missions ===
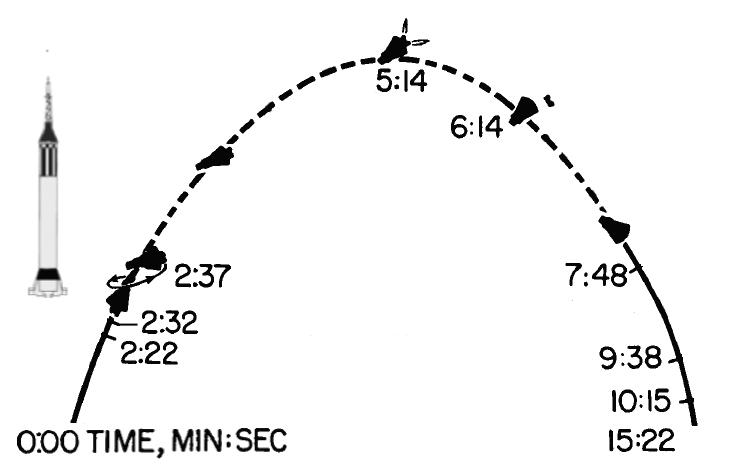
Profile. See timetable for explanation. Dashed line: region of weightlessness.

A Redstone rocket was used to boost the capsule for 2 minutes and 30 seconds to an altitude of 32 nautical miles (59 km); the capsule continued ascending on a ballistic curve after booster separation. The launch escape system was jettisoned at the same time. At the top of the curve, the spacecraft's retrorockets were fired for testing purposes; they were not necessary for reentry because orbital speed had not been attained. The spacecraft landed in the Atlantic Ocean. The suborbital mission took about 15 minutes, had an apogee altitude of 102–103 nautical miles (189–191 km), and a downrange distance of 262 nautical miles (485 km). From the time of booster-spacecraft separation until reentry where air started to slow down the spacecraft, the pilot would experience weightlessness as shown on the image. (Note: With the exception of the 20 seconds of retrofire during which the pilot would experience g-force.) The recovery procedure would be the same as an orbital mission.[AS]

Timetable (mm:ss)
0:00	Launch
2:22	Launch vehicle cut-off and tower separation
2:32	Spacecraft separation
2:37	Turnaround
5:14	Retrofire
6:14	Retropack jettisoned
7:48	Reentry
9:38	Drogue deployed
10:15	Main chute deployed
15:22	Landing

=== Orbital missions ===
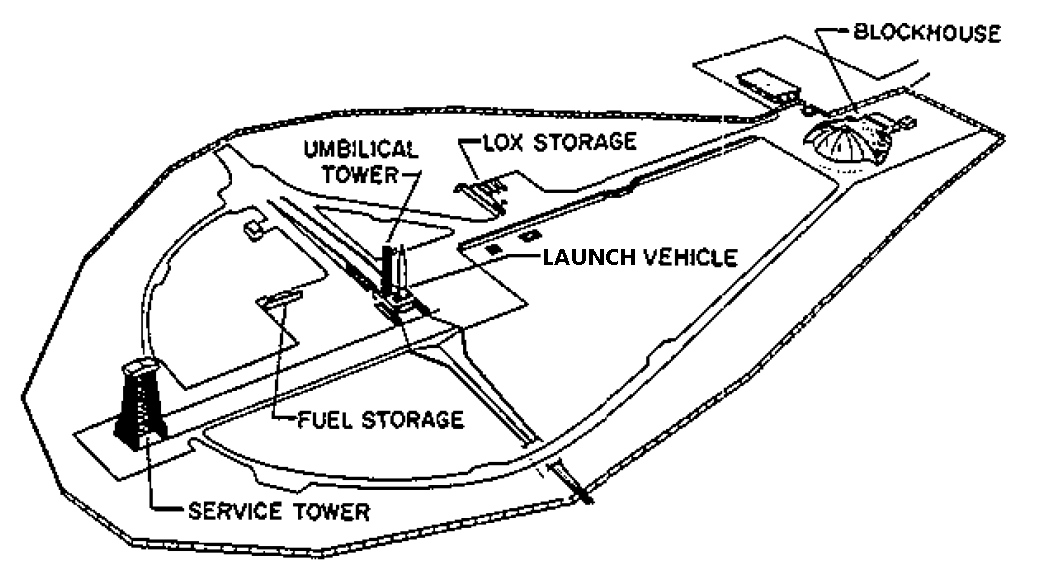
Launch Complex 14 just before launch (service tower rolled aside). Preparations for launch were made in the blockhouse.

Preparations for a mission started a month in advance with the selection of the primary and back-up astronaut; they would practice together for the mission. For three days prior to launch, the astronaut went through a special diet to minimize his need for defecating during the flight. On the morning of the trip he typically ate a steak breakfast. After having sensors applied to his body and being dressed in the pressure suit, he started breathing pure oxygen to prepare him for the atmosphere of the spacecraft. He arrived at the launch pad, took the elevator up the launch tower and entered the spacecraft two hours before launch. (Note: Inside the spacecraft the other astronauts had usually prepared a practical joke, such as a sign saying "No handball playing".) Once the astronaut was secured inside, the hatch was bolted, the launch area evacuated and the mobile tower rolled back. After this, the launch vehicle was filled with liquid oxygen. The entire procedure of preparing for launch and launching the spacecraft followed a time table called the countdown. It started a day in advance with a pre-count, in which all systems of the launch vehicle and spacecraft were checked. After that followed a 15-hour hold, during which pyrotechnics were installed. Then came the main countdown which for orbital flights started 6½ hours before launch (T – 390 min), counted backwards to launch (T = 0) and then forward until orbital insertion (T + 5 min). (Note: Countdown was controlled from the blockhouse at the Launch Complex until 2 min. before launch then it was transferred to Mission Control Center. The countdown of the last 10 sec. before launch would be given to the astronaut by one of the others and included on TV transmissions which had already started.)

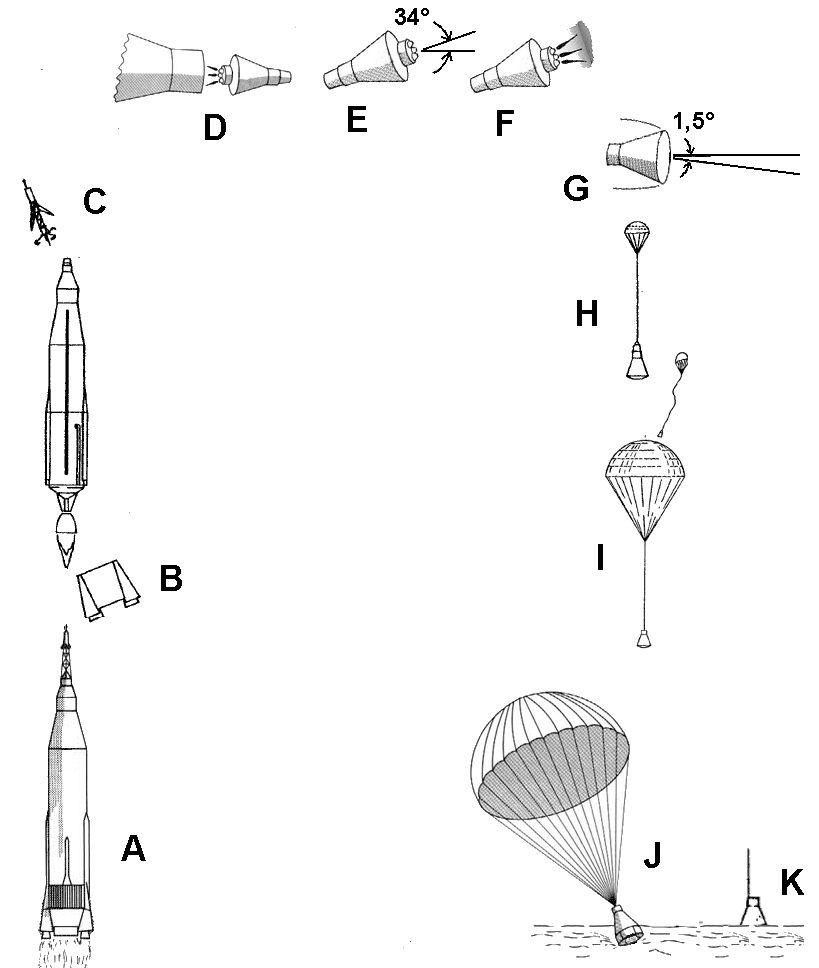
Launch and reentry profiles: A-C: launch; D: orbital insertion; E-K: reentry and landing

On an orbital mission, the Atlas' rocket engines were ignited four seconds before lift-off. The launch vehicle was held to the ground by clamps and then released when sufficient thrust was built up at lift-off (A). After 30 seconds of flight, the point of maximum dynamic pressure against the vehicle was reached, at which the astronaut felt heavy vibrations. After 2 minutes and 10 seconds, the two outboard booster engines shut down and were released with the aft skirt, leaving the center sustainer engine running (B). At this point, the launch escape system was no longer needed, and was separated from the spacecraft by its jettison rocket (C). (Note: In the event of a launch abort before this point, the launch escape system would fire its main rocket for one second, pulling the spacecraft and astronaut away from the launch vehicle and a possible explosion. At this point, the spacecraft could be separated from the launch vehicle and land using its parachute.) The space vehicle moved gradually to a horizontal attitude until, at an altitude of 87 nautical miles (161 km), the sustainer engine shut down and the spacecraft was inserted into orbit (D). This happened after 5 minutes and 10 seconds in a direction pointing east, whereby the spacecraft would gain speed from the rotation of the Earth. (Note: The direction of insertion was east and slightly to the north, meaning that, on a three-orbit flight, the tracking network was used optimally and a landing could take place in the North Atlantic Ocean.) Here the spacecraft fired the three posigrade rockets for a second to separate it from the launch vehicle. (Note: The sustainer would disintegrate and fall down; after the launch of Friendship 7 a part of the sustainer was found in South Africa.) Just before orbital insertion and sustainer engine cutoff, g-loads peaked at 8 g (6 g for a suborbital flight). In orbit, the spacecraft automatically turned 180°, pointed the retropackage forward and its nose 14.5° downward and kept this attitude for the rest of the orbital phase to facilitate communication with the ground. (Note: The capsule's tendency to drift was countered automatically by the attitude control system (ASCS) which used small hydrogen peroxide thrusters. To save fuel, however, the spacecraft would be allowed to drift from time to time, especially on longer missions.)

Once in orbit, it was not possible for the spacecraft to change its trajectory except by initiating reentry. Each orbit would typically take 88 minutes to complete. The lowest point of the orbit, called perigee, was at about 87 nautical miles (161 km) altitude, and the highest point, called apogee, was about 150 nautical miles (280 km) altitude. When leaving orbit (E), the angle of retrofire was 34° downward from the flight path angle. Retrorockets fired for 10 seconds each (F) in a sequence where one started 5 seconds after the other. During reentry (G), the astronaut would experience about 8 g (11–12 g on a suborbital mission). The temperature around the heat shield rose to 3,000 °F (1,600 °C) and at the same time, there was a two-minute radio blackout due to ionization of the air around the spacecraft.

After reentry, a small, drogue parachute (H) was deployed at 21,000 ft (6,400 m) for stabilizing the spacecraft's descent. The main parachute (I) was deployed at 10,000 ft (3,000 m) starting with a narrow opening that opened fully in a few seconds to lessen the strain on the lines. Just before hitting the water, the landing bag inflated from behind the heat shield to reduce the force of impact (J). Upon landing the parachutes were released. An antenna (K) was raised and sent out signals that could be traced by ships and helicopters. Further, a green marker dye was spread around the spacecraft to make its location more visible from the air. (Note: Radar chaff and a SOFAR bomb which could be detected by the recovery ship's hydrophone were eliminated as unnecessary measures after the first orbital flight.) Frogmen brought in by helicopters inflated a collar around the craft to keep it upright in the water. (Note: The collar was not ready for suborbital missions.) The recovery helicopter hooked onto the spacecraft and the astronaut blew the escape hatch to exit the capsule. He was then hoisted aboard the helicopter that finally brought both him and the spacecraft to the ship. (Note: It was also possible to exit the capsule through the nose cylinder; only Carpenter did this.)

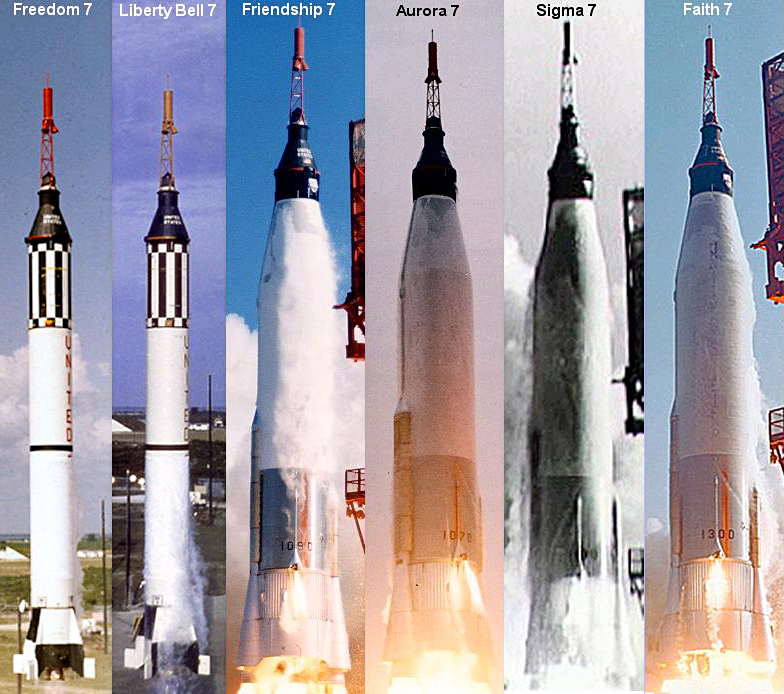
Mercury crewed launches

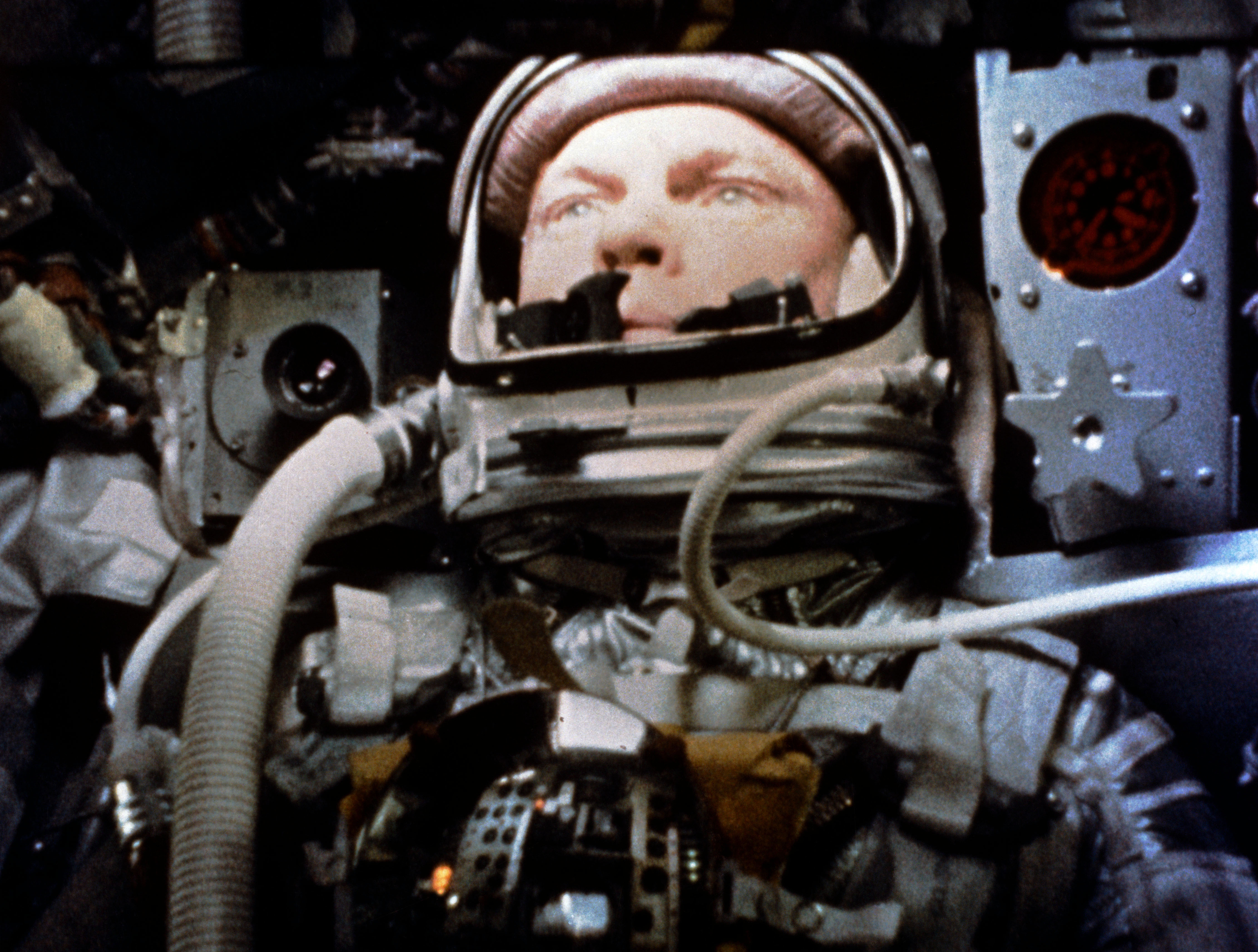
John Glenn in orbit, 1962 (Mercury-Atlas 6)

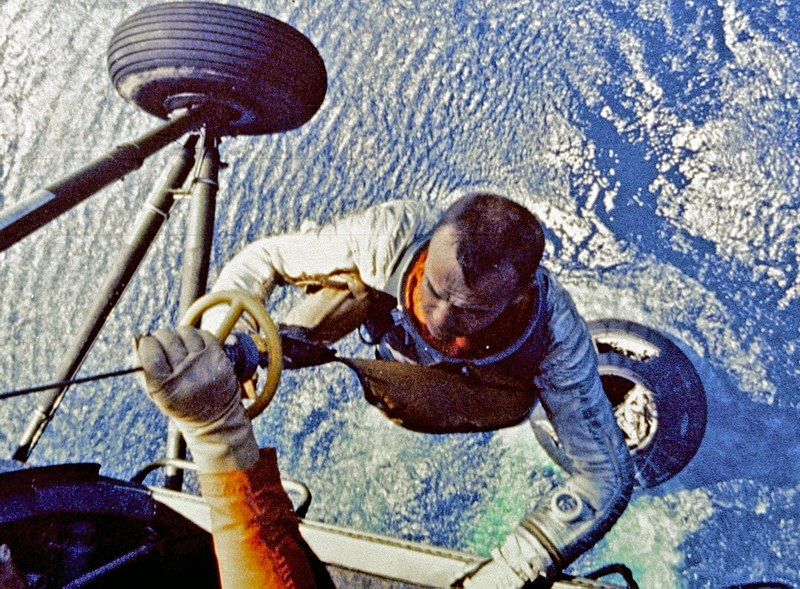
Alan Shepard's 1961 recovery seen from helicopter (Mercury-Redstone 3)

== Ground control ==
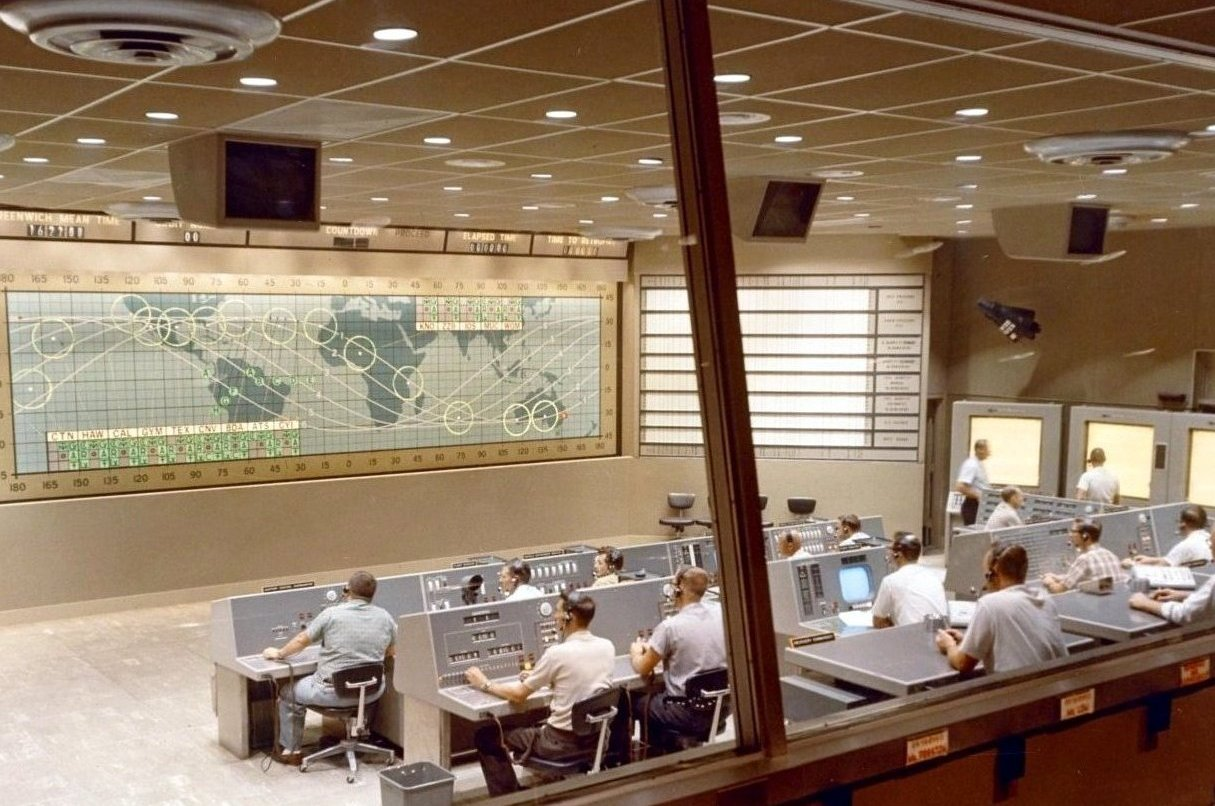
Inside Control Center at Cape Canaveral (Mercury-Atlas 8)

The number of personnel supporting a Mercury mission was typically around 18,000, with about 15,000 people associated with recovery. (Note: T. J. O'Malley pushed the button to launch Glenn while the Site Manager and Launch Conductor at Complex 14, Calvin D. Fowler, pushed the button to launch Carpenter, Schirra, and Cooper.) Most of the others followed the spacecraft from the Mercury Space Flight Network, a chain of 18 stations placed around the equator, which was based on a network used for satellites and made ready in 1960. It collected data from the spacecraft and provided two-way communication between the astronaut and the ground. Each station had a range of 700 nautical miles (1,300 km) and a pass typically lasted 7 minutes. Mercury astronauts on the ground would take the role of Capsule Communicator, or CAPCOM, who communicated with the astronaut in orbit. (Note: Occasionally this communication was broadcast on live TV while the spacecraft was passing over the United States.) Data from the spacecraft were sent to the ground, processed at the Goddard Space Center by a redundant pair of transistorized IBM 7090 computers and relayed to the Mercury Control Center at Cape Canaveral. In the Control Center, the data were displayed on boards on each side of a world map, which showed the position of the spacecraft, its ground track and the place it could land in an emergency within the next 30 minutes.

Other computers associated with ground control for Mercury included a vacuum-tube-based IBM 709 system in Cape Canaveral which determined whether a mid-launch abort might be needed and where an aborting capsule would land, another IBM 709 in Bermuda which served as backup for the two IBM 7090 transistor-based machines at Goddard, and a Burroughs-GE system which provided radio guidance for the Atlas during launch.

The Manned Space Flight Network went on to serve subsequent space programs, until it was replaced by a satellite relay system in the 1980s. Mission Control Center was moved from Cape Canaveral to Houston in 1965.

Tracking network
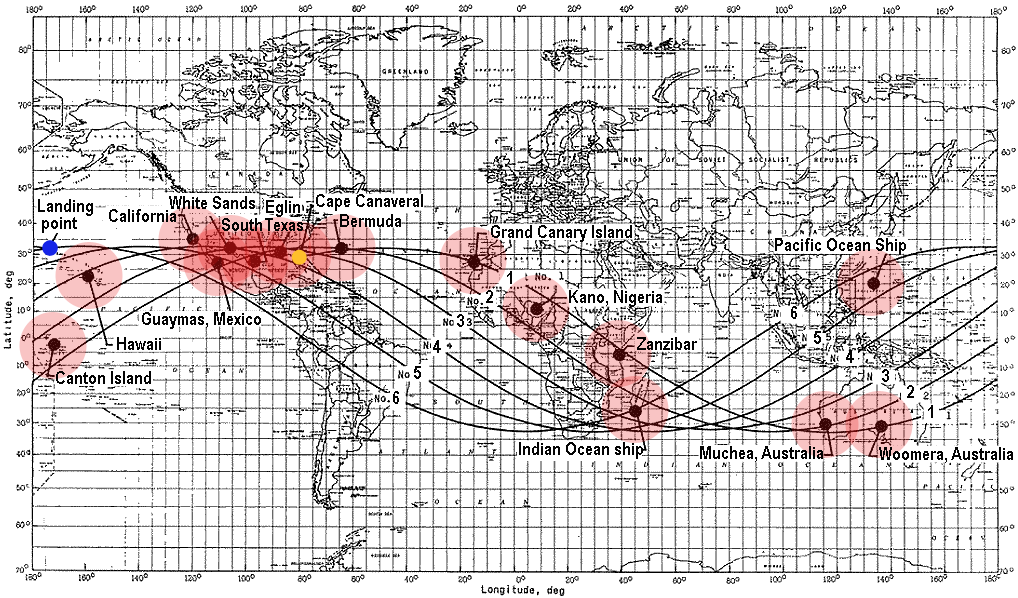
Ground track and tracking stations for Mercury-Atlas 8. Spacecraft starts from Cape Canaveral in Florida and moves east; each new orbit-track is displaced to the left due to the rotation of the Earth. It moves between latitudes 32.5° north and 32.5° south. Key: 1–6: orbit number. Yellow: launch. Black dot: tracking station. Red: range of station; Blue: landing.

== Flights ==
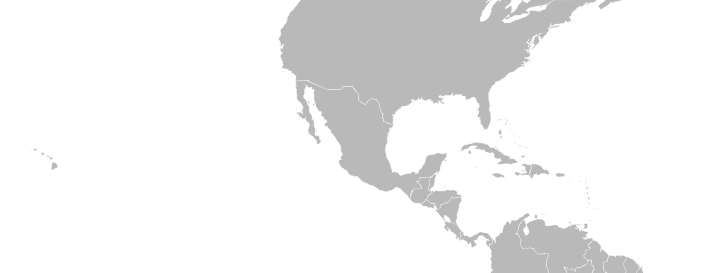
Project Mercury landing sites

On April 12, 1961, the Soviet cosmonaut Yuri Gagarin became the first person in space on an orbital flight. Alan Shepard became the first American in space on a suborbital flight three weeks later, on May 5, 1961. John Glenn, the third Mercury astronaut to fly, became the first American to reach orbit on February 20, 1962, but only after the Soviets had launched a second cosmonaut, Gherman Titov, into a day-long flight in August 1961. Three more Mercury orbital flights were made, ending on May 16, 1963, with a day-long, 22 orbit flight. However, the Soviet Union ended its Vostok program the next month, with the human spaceflight endurance record set by the 82-orbit, almost 5-day Vostok 5 flight.

=== Crewed ===
All of the six crewed Mercury flights were successful, though some planned flights were canceled during the project (see below). The main medical problems encountered were simple personal hygiene, and post-flight symptoms of low blood pressure. The launch vehicles had been tested through uncrewed flights, therefore the numbering of crewed missions did not start with 1. Also, there were two separately numbered series: MR for "Mercury-Redstone" (suborbital flights), and MA for "Mercury-Atlas" (orbital flights). These names were not popularly used, since the astronauts followed a pilot tradition, each giving their spacecraft a name. They selected names ending with a "7" to commemorate the seven astronauts. Spacecraft production numbers don't match the mission order, with some capsules being reserved as backup or used in tests. Times given are Coordinated Universal Time, local time + 5 hours. MA = Mercury-Atlas, MR = Mercury-Redstone, LC = Launch Complex. (Note: Alexander & al., 1966, pp. 638–641.)

Mission	Spacecraft No.	Call-sign	Pilot	Launch		Duration	Orbits	Apogee mi (km)	Perigee mi (km)	Max. velocity mph (km/h)	Miss mi (km)
Mission	Spacecraft No.	Call-sign	Pilot	time	site	Duration	Orbits	Apogee mi (km)	Perigee mi (km)	Max. velocity mph (km/h)	Miss mi (km)
MR-3	7	Freedom 7	Shepard	14:34 on May 5, 1961	LC-5	15 m 22 s	0	117 (188)	—	5,134 (8,262)	3.5 (5.6)
MR-4	11	Liberty Bell 7	Grissom	12:20 on Jul. 21, 1961	LC-5	15 m 37 s	0	118 (190)	—	5,168 (8,317)	5.8 (9.3)
MA-6	13	Friendship 7	Glenn	14:47 on Feb. 20, 1962	LC-14	4 h 55 m 23 s	3	162 (261)	100 (161)	17,544 (28,234)	46 (74)
MA-7	18	Aurora 7	Carpenter	12:45 on May 24, 1962	LC-14	4 h 56 m 5 s	3	167 (269)	100 (161)	17,549 (28,242)	248 (400)
MA-8	16	Sigma 7	Schirra	12:15 on Oct. 3, 1962	LC-14	9 h 13 m 15 s	6	176 (283)	100 (161)	17,558 (28,257)	4.6 (7.4)
MA-9	20	Faith 7	Cooper	13:04 on May 15, 1963	LC-14	1 d 10 h 19 m 49 s	22	166 (267)	100 (161)	17,547 (28,239)	5.0 (8.1)

Remarks
Mercury-Redstone 3	First American in space. Recovered by carrier USS Lake Champlain.
Mercury-Redstone 4	Spacecraft sank during recovery when hatch unexpectedly blew off. (Note: It was recovered in 1999.) Astronaut recovered by carrier USS Randolph.
Mercury-Atlas 6	First American in orbit. Retropack retained during reentry. (Note: Launch of Friendship 7 was postponed repeatedly during two months; a frustrated politician compared the spacecraft-Atlas combination to "a Rube Goldberg device on top of a plumber's nightmare".) Recovered by destroyer USS Noa.
Mercury-Atlas 7	Carpenter replaced Deke Slayton. (Note: Carpenter's overshoot of the landing site was caused by a malfunction in the automatic stabilization, which meant that retrofire was out of line with the movement of the spacecraft) Recovered by destroyer USS Farragut. Biggest miss. (Note: During Carpenter's mission a seaplane from the US Air Force got to the landing site about 1½ hour ahead of the Navy ships and offered to pick him up. This, however, was declined by the admiral in charge of Mercury recovery operations, which led to a Senate hearing about the incident.)
Mercury-Atlas 8	The flight closest to plan. Carried out maneuvering tests. Recovered by carrier USS Kearsarge.
Mercury-Atlas 9	First American in space for over a day. Last American solo mission. (Note: Likely to be so according to Alexander & al.) Recovered by USS Kearsarge.
Recovery variations	MA6) spacecraft and astronaut hoist onboard directly; MA8) spacecraft and astronaut towed by boat to ship; MA9) spacecraft with astronaut inside flown to ship.

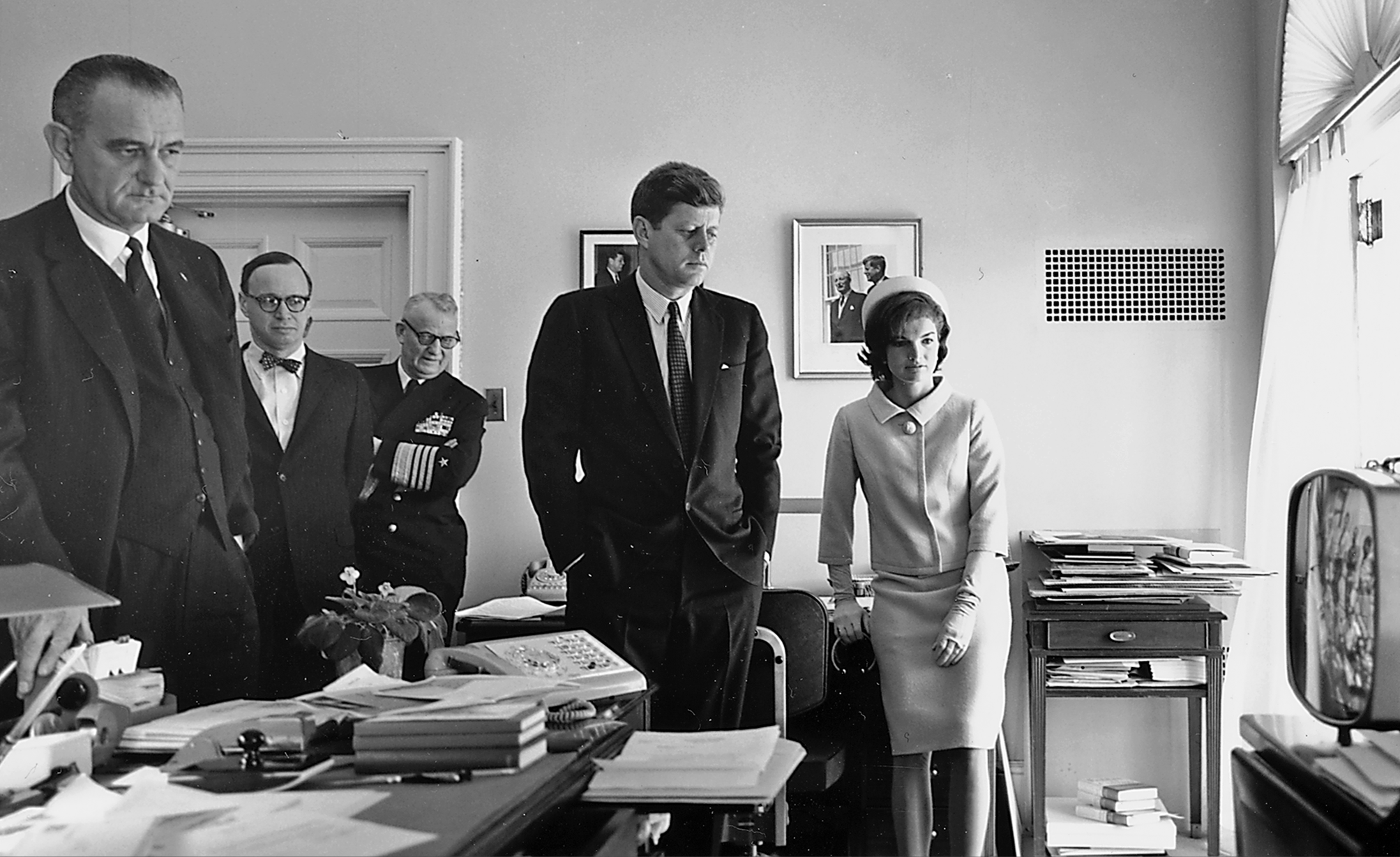
Shepard's flight watched on TV in the White House. May 1961.

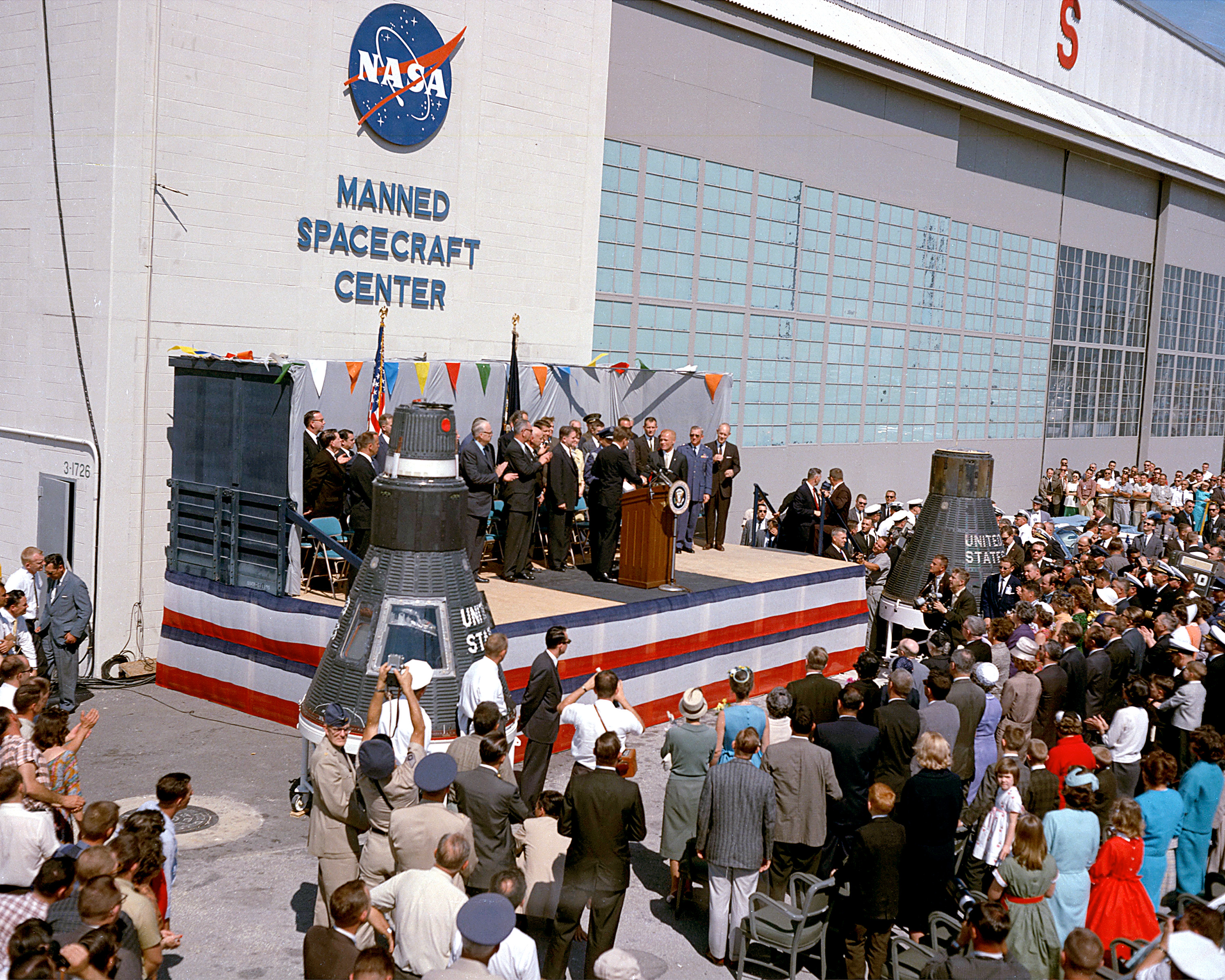
John Glenn honored by the President. February 1962

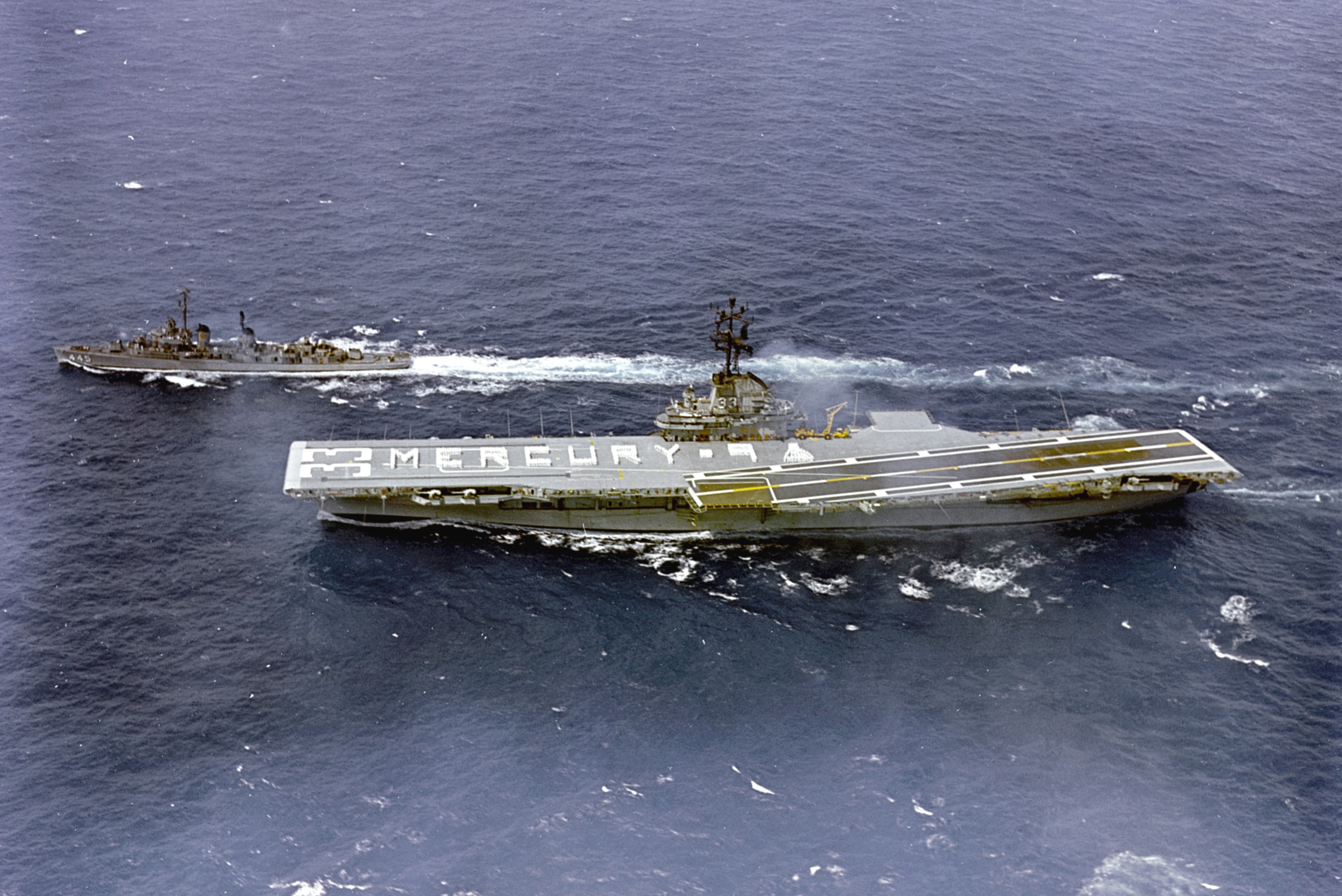
USS Kearsarge with crew spelling Mercury-9. May 1963.

=== Uncrewed and chimpanzee flights ===
The 20 uncrewed flights used Little Joe, Redstone, and Atlas launch vehicles. They were used to develop the launch vehicles, launch escape system, spacecraft and tracking network. One flight of a Scout rocket attempted to launch a specialized satellite equipped with Mercury communications components for testing the ground tracking network, but the booster failed soon after liftoff. The Little Joe program used seven airframes for eight flights, of which three were successful. The second Little Joe flight was named Little Joe 6, because it was inserted into the program after the first 5 airframes had been allocated. Production spacecraft and boilerplates were used for these test flights.

Mission (Note: Source: Alexander & al., 1966, pp. 638–641 when nothing else is mentioned.)	Spacecraft No.	Launch	Duration	Purpose	Result
Little Joe 1	Boilerplate	August 21, 1959	20 s	Test of launch escape system during flight.	Failure
Big Joe 1	Big Joe Boilerplate	September 9, 1959	13 m 00 s	Test of heat shield and Atlas/spacecraft interface.	Partial success
Little Joe 6	Boilerplate	October 4, 1959	5 m 10 s	Test of spacecraft aerodynamics and integrity.	Partial success
Little Joe 1A	Boilerplate	November 4, 1959	8 m 11 s	Test of launch escape system during flight with boiler plate capsule.	Partial success
Little Joe 2	Boilerplate	December 4, 1959	11 m 6 s	Escape system test with primate at high altitude.	Success
Little Joe 1B	Boilerplate	January 21, 1960	8 m 35 s	Maximum-q abort and escape test with primate with boiler plate capsule.	Success
Beach Abort	1	May 9, 1960	1 m 31 s	Test of the off-the-pad abort system.	Success
Mercury-Atlas 1	4	July 29, 1960	3 m 18 s	Test of spacecraft / Atlas combination.	Failure
Little Joe 5	3	November 8, 1960	2 m 22 s	First Little Joe escape system test with a production spacecraft, at max-q.	Failure
Mercury-Redstone 1	2	November 21, 1960	2 s	Qualification of spacecraft / Redstone combination.	Failure
Mercury-Redstone 1A	2	December 19, 1960	15 m 45 s	Qualification of spacecraft / Redstone combination.	Success
Mercury-Redstone 2	5	January 31, 1961	16 m 39 s	Qualification of spacecraft with chimpanzee named Ham.	Success
Mercury-Atlas 2	6	February 21, 1961	17 m 56 s	Qualified Mercury/Atlas interface.	Success
Little Joe 5A	14	March 18, 1961	5 m 25 s	Second test of escape system with a production Mercury spacecraft.	Partial success
Mercury-Redstone BD	Boilerplate	March 24, 1961	8 m 23 s	Final Redstone test flight.	Success
Mercury-Atlas 3	8	April 25, 1961	7 m 19 s	Orbital flight with robot astronaut. (Note: A machine that produced the same heat, vapor and CO_{2} as an astronaut.)	Failure
Little Joe 5B	14	April 28, 1961	5 m 25 s	Third test of escape system with a production spacecraft.	Success
Mercury-Atlas 4	8	September 13, 1961	1 h 49 m 20 s	Test of environmental control system with robot astronaut in orbit.	Success
Mercury-Scout 1	-	November 1, 1961	44 s	Special satellite to test Mercury tracking network.	Failure
Mercury-Atlas 5	9	November 29, 1961	3 h 20 m 59 s	Test of environmental control system in orbit with chimpanzee named Enos.	Success

After suborbital crewed flights

Remarks
Little Joe 1	Due to an electrical malfunction, the escape tower ignited ½ hour before launch and took the spacecraft with it, leaving the rocket on the ground.
Big Joe 1	Actually the first Mercury-Atlas flight. Recovered by USS Strong 2,407 km SE of Cape Canaveral. Altitude: 65 mi (105 km) Qualified ablative heatshield.
Little Joe 6	No additional tests
Little Joe 1A	The rescue tower rocket ignited 10 seconds too late. Recovered by USS Opportune 11.5 mi (18.5 km) SE of Wallops Island.
Little Joe 2	Carried Sam, a rhesus macaque. Recovered by USS Borie 194 mi (312 km) SE of Wallops Island, Virginia; altitude: 53 mi (85 km).
Little Joe 1B	Carried a female rhesus monkey named Miss Sam.
Beach Abort	A production spacecraft with minimal equipment was lifted from the ground by the launch escape system alone at Wallops Island. It reached an apogee of 0.751 kilometres (2,465 ft) and was recovered after landing. Top velocity: 436 metres per second (976 mph). Total payload: 1,154 kg.
Mercury-Atlas 1	Exploded while passing through max-q. To save weight, the airframe had been made thinner since Big Joe, which led to a collapse. The next Atlas was strengthened by a temporary solution while the rest were made from the same specifications as Big Joe.
Little Joe 5	The clamp holding the spacecraft was deflected by air pressure; due to this and incorrect wiring, the escape tower ignited too early and further failed to separate spacecraft from launch vehicle. (Note: The clamp was subsequently tested by a rocket sled.) Altitude: 10 mi (16 km)
Mercury-Redstone 1	Engine shutdown caused by improper separation of electrical cables; vehicle rose 4 in (10 cm) and settled back on the pad. (Note: Immediately after the Redstone's engine shut down, the capsule's escape rocket jettisoned itself, leaving the capsule attached to the booster. The escape rocket rose to an altitude of 4,000 ft (1,200 m) and landed about 400 yd (370 m) away. Three seconds after the escape rocket fired, the capsule deployed its drogue parachute; it then deployed the main and reserve parachutes.)
Mercury-Redstone 1A	First flight of Mercury / Redstone. Recovered by USS Valley Forge. Altitude: 130 mi (210 km)
Mercury-Redstone 2	Carried the chimpanzee Ham on suborbital flight. Recovered by USS Donner 422 mi (679 km) SE of Cape Canaveral; altitude: 157 mi (253 km)
Mercury-Atlas 2	Recovered by USS Donner 1,432 mi (2,305 km) SE of Cape Canaveral.
Little Joe 5A	Tower fired 14 seconds too soon; it failed to separate the spacecraft from the rocket.
Mercury-Redstone BD	BD: Booster Development)
Mercury-Atlas 3	Upgraded from suborbital flight. Was aborted when the Atlas continued to vertically climb instead of tilting toward orbit; escaping capsule was recovered and reused in Mercury-Atlas 4.
Little Joe 5B	Concluded Little Joe program.
Mercury-Atlas 4	Completed one orbit and sent data to the ground; first orbital flight of the project. Recovery by USS Decatur 176 mi (283 km) east of Bermuda.
Mercury-Scout 1	Was aborted after malfunction of booster's guidance system; results of Mercury-Atlas 4 and Mercury-Atlas 5 were used instead.
Mercury-Atlas 5	Chimpanzee Enos completed a two-orbit flight, performing tasks to prove it possible for a person to function during a flight. (Note: Was given a reward in the form a banana pellet or a punishment in the form of mild electrical shocks depending on whether or not he gave the right response to a given signal; by mistake he was sometimes given shocks on right answers.) Last Mercury-Atlas test flight. Recovery by USS Stormes 255 mi (410 km) SE of Bermuda.

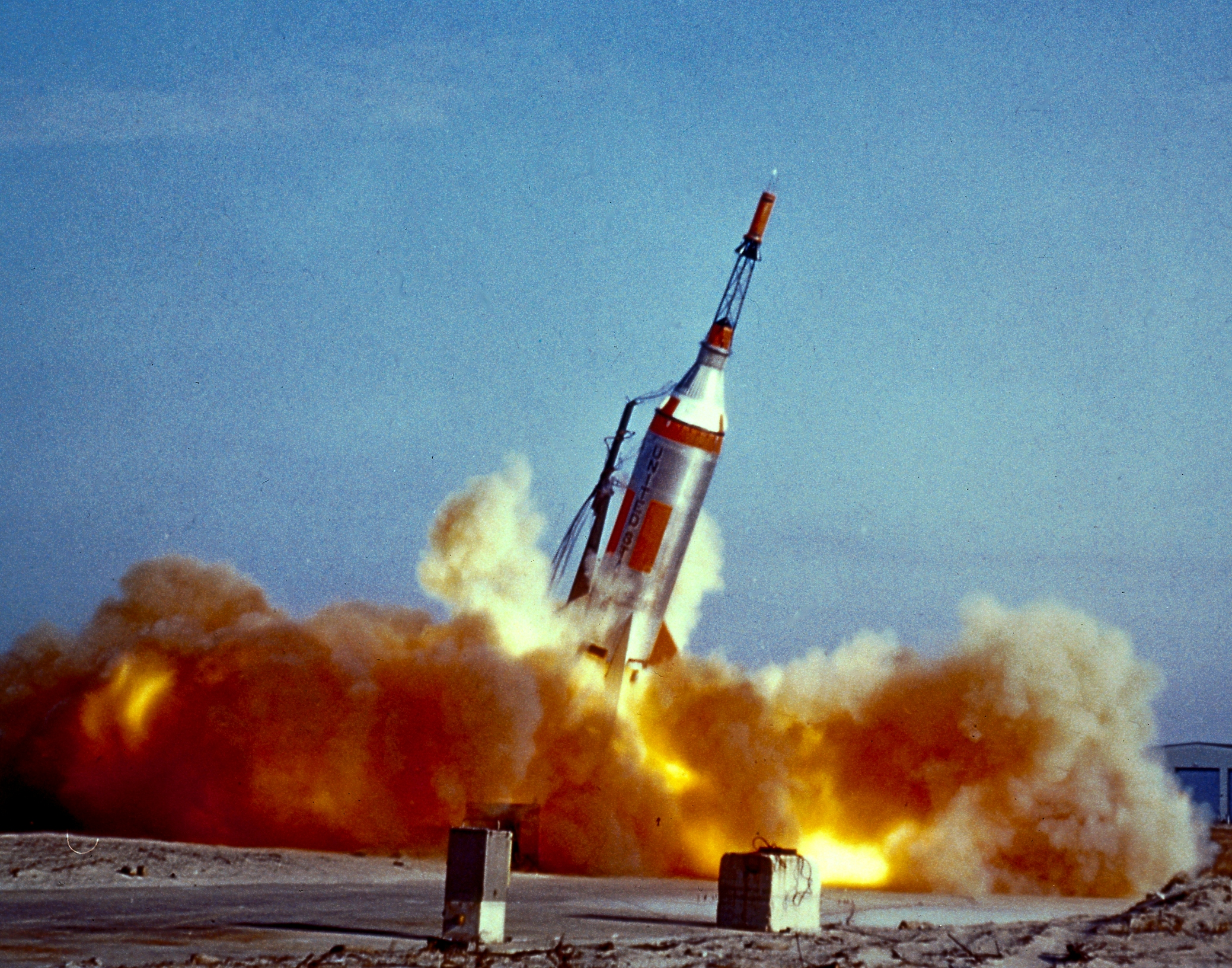
Little Joe 1B at launch with Miss Sam, 1960

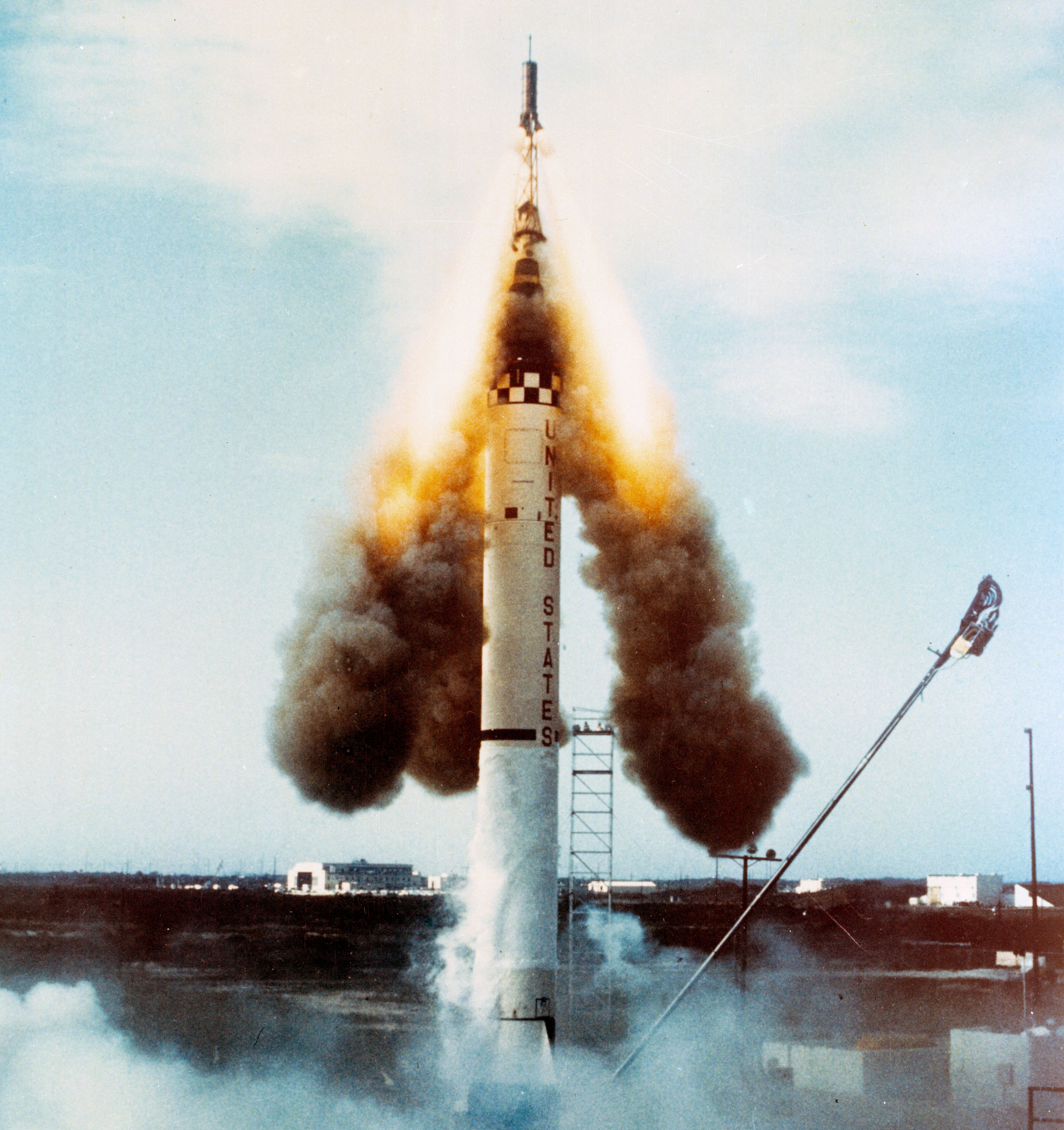
Mercury-Redstone 1: launch escape system lift-off after 4'' launch, 1960

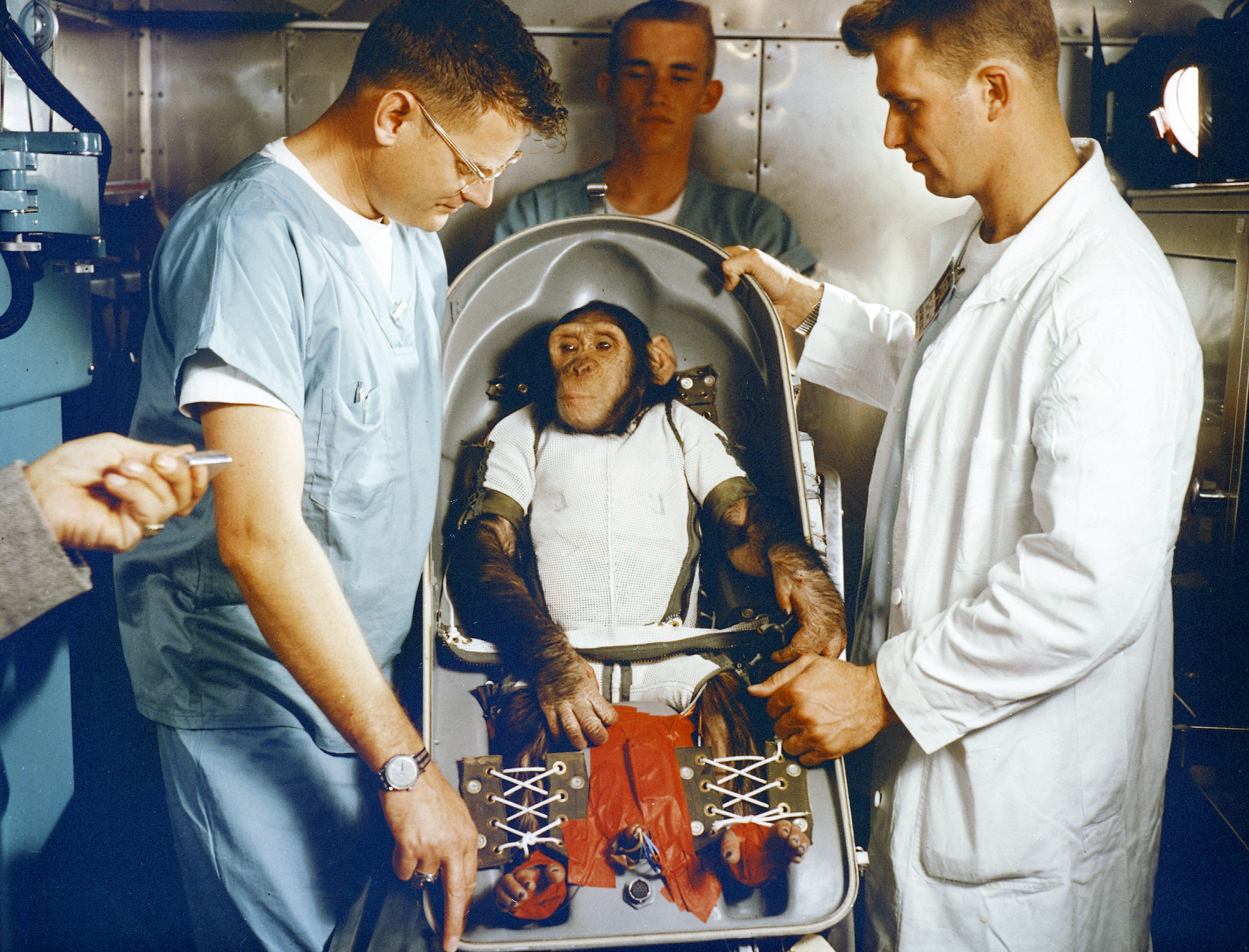
Mercury-Redstone 2: Ham, 1961

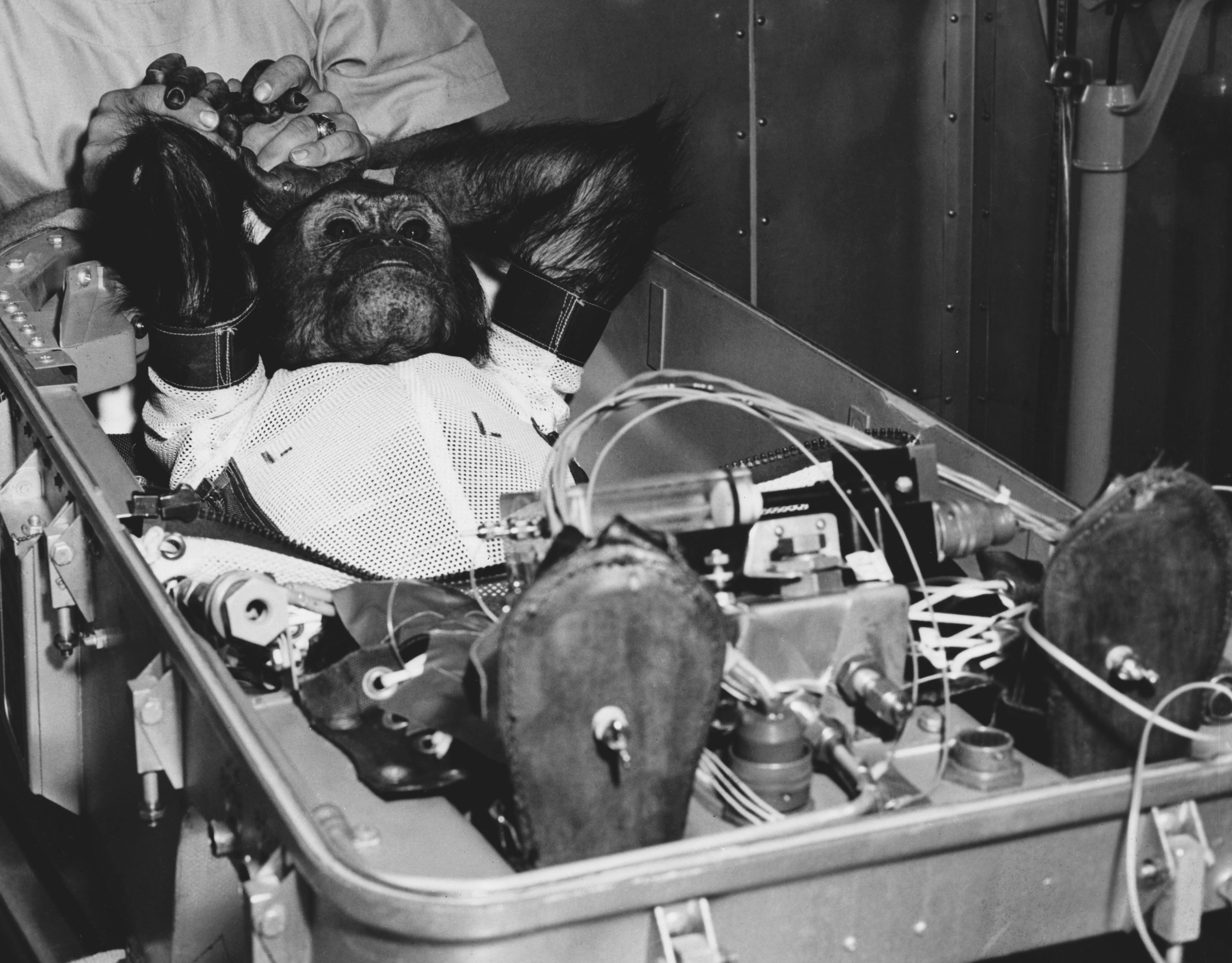
Mercury-Atlas 5: Enos, 1961

=== Canceled ===
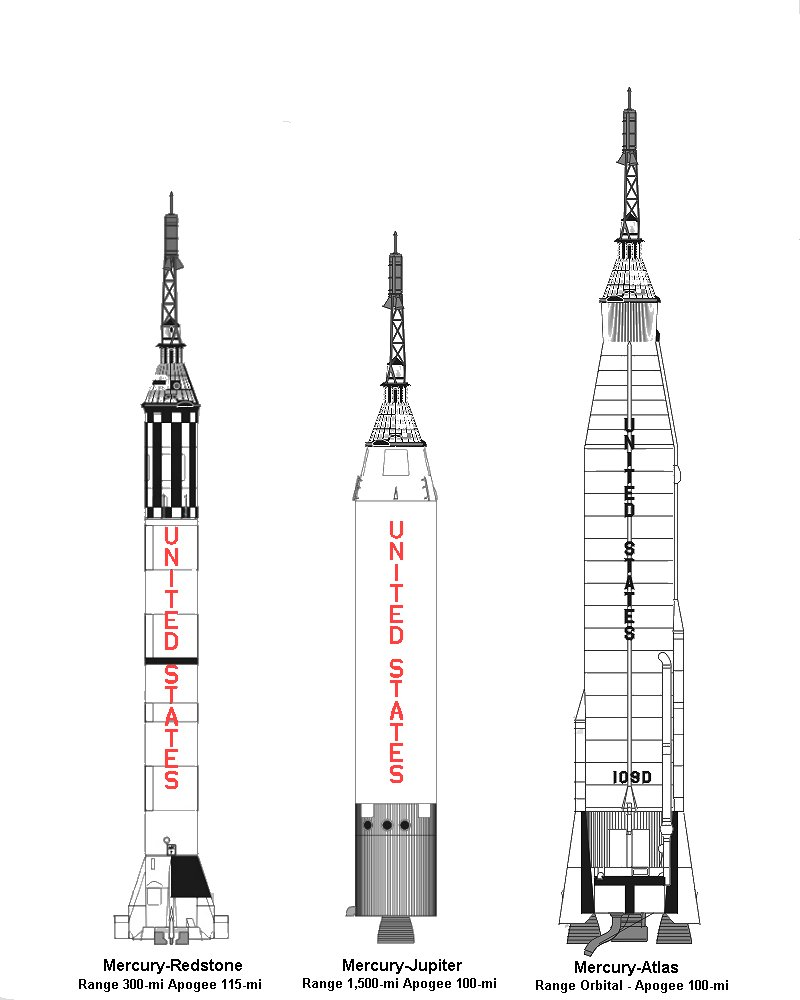
Mercury-Jupiter (center) compared with Redstone (left) and Atlas (right).

Nine of the planned flights were canceled.

Mercury-Jupiter was a proposed suborbital launch configuration consisting of a Jupiter missile carrying a Mercury capsule. Two flights were planned in support of Project Mercury. The Mercury-Jupiter 1 flight would have been a heat shield test. The Mercury-Jupiter 2 flight was planned as a maximum dynamic pressure qualification test of the production Mercury spacecraft with a chimpanzee on board. On July 1, 1959, less than a year after the October, 1958 program start date, the flights were canceled due to budget constraints.

Suborbital flights were planned for four other astronauts but the number of flights was cut down gradually and finally all remaining were canceled after Titov's flight. (Note: Within the Mercury Project organization the suborbital flights were from the start criticized as being of little value and even compared to a circus act.)

Mercury-Atlas 9 was intended to be followed by more one-day flights and even a three-day flight but with the coming of the Gemini Project it seemed unnecessary. The Jupiter booster was, as mentioned above, intended to be used for different purposes.

Although its flight was never formally planned from 1960 to 1962 the Langley Research Center developed and made two prototypes of the Erectable Torus Manned Space Laboratory which would have been an inflatable space station that rotated to produce 1g of artificial gravity. The station would've had a crew of 6 and would have launched from a Mercury-Atlas 3 before it was cancelled due to fears of puncture or the station tumbling out of control with resources redirected to the Apollo program.

Mission	Pilot	Planned Launch	Cancellation
Mercury-Jupiter 1			July 1, 1959
Mercury-Jupiter 2	Chimpanzee	First quarter, 1960	July 1, 1959 (Note: Proposed maximum dynamic pressure test for capsule.)
Mercury-Redstone 5	Glenn (likely)	March 1960	August 1961
Mercury-Redstone 6		April 1960	July 1961
Mercury-Redstone 7		May 1960	
Mercury-Redstone 8		June 1960	
Mercury-Atlas 10	Shepard	October 1963	June 13, 1963 (Note: Mercury-Atlas 10 was intended to be a three-day mission in November 1962 with extra supplies attached to the heat shield. Call-sign Freedom 7-II. By January 1963, it was changed to a one-day back up mission for Mercury-Atlas 9. It was canceled after the success of the latter.)
Mercury-Atlas 11	Grissom	Fourth quarter, 1963	October 1962
Mercury-Atlas 12	Schirra	Fourth quarter, 1963	October 1962

== Legacy ==
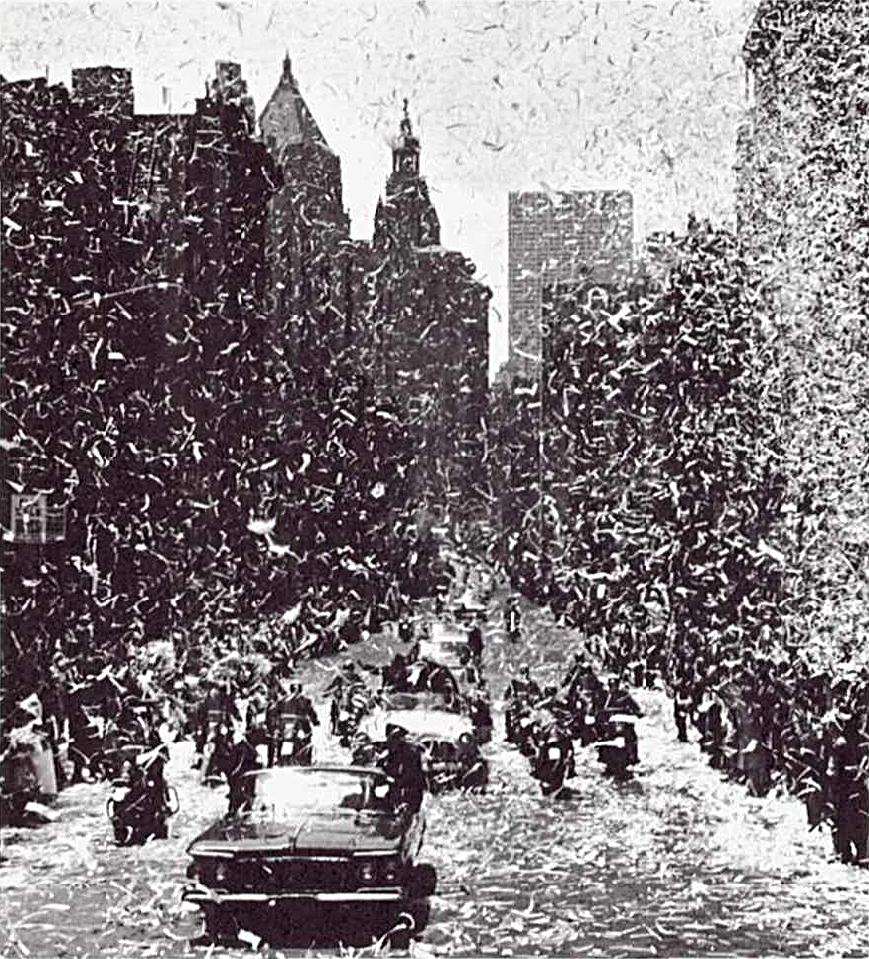
Ticker tape parade for Gordon Cooper in New York City, May 1963

Today the Mercury program is commemorated as the first American human space program. It did not win the race against the Soviet Union, but gave back national prestige and was scientifically a successful precursor of later programs such as Gemini, Apollo and Skylab. (Note: International rules required that a pilot must land safely with the spacecraft; in reality, Gagarin landed separately by parachute; however, the Soviet Union did not admit this until 1971 when their claim was no longer in danger of being challenged.)

During the 1950s, some experts doubted that human spaceflight was possible. (Note: In May 1957, five months before Sputnik I, the president of McDonnell, later the prime contractor, predicted that human spaceflight would not take place before 1990.) Still, when John F. Kennedy was elected president, many, including him, had doubts about the project. As president he chose to support the programs a few months before the launch of Freedom 7, which became a public success. (Note: Along the roads in the US, drivers stopped to follow Freedom 7 on the radio. Later, 100 millions saw or listened to Friendship 7, the first orbital flight, on TV or radio. The launch of Sigma 7 and Faith 7 were relayed live via communication satellite to television audiences in Western Europe. Two of the three major US networks covered Sigma 7 minute-by-minute, while the third was showing the opening of the World Series.) Afterwards, a majority of the American public supported human spaceflight, and, within a few weeks, Kennedy announced a plan for a crewed mission to land on the Moon and return safely to Earth before the end of the 1960s.

The six astronauts who flew were awarded medals, driven in parades and two of them were invited to address a joint session of the US Congress. Seeing as no women previously met the qualifications for the astronaut program, the question was raised as to whether or not they could. This led to the development of a project named Mercury 13 by the media, in which thirteen American women successfully underwent the tests. The Mercury 13 program was not officially conducted by NASA. It was created by NASA physician William Randolph Lovelace, who developed the physical and psychological tests used to select NASA's first seven male astronauts for Project Mercury. The women completed physical and psychological tests, but were never required to complete the training as the privately funded program was quickly cancelled. No female candidates adequately met the qualifications for the astronaut program until 1978, when a few finally qualified for the Space Shuttle program.

Military Highway in Hampton, Virginia and Newport News, Virginia was renamed to Mercury Boulevard.

On February 25, 2011, the Institute of Electrical and Electronics Engineers, the world's largest technical professional society, awarded Boeing (the successor company to McDonnell Aircraft) a Milestone Award for important inventions which debuted on the Mercury spacecraft. (Note: Boeing received the award in recognition of Project Mercury's pioneering "navigation and control instruments, autopilot, rate stabilization and control, and fly-by-wire systems.")

=== Depictions on film ===
A short documentary, The John Glenn Story, was released in 1962.

On film the program was portrayed in The Right Stuff, a 1983 adaptation of Tom Wolfe's 1979 book of the same name, in the 1998 HBO miniseries From the Earth to the Moon, in the 2016 film Hidden Figures, and the 2020 Disney+ series The Right Stuff, which is also based on the Tom Wolfe book.

=== Commemorations ===
In 1964, a monument commemorating Project Mercury was unveiled near Launch Complex 14 at Cape Canaveral, featuring a metal logo combining the symbol of Mercury with the number 7. This design was first issued to the Mercury astronauts in 1960 as a lapel pin. In 1962, the United States Postal Service honored the Mercury-Atlas 6 flight with a Project Mercury commemorative stamp, the first US postal issue to depict a crewed spacecraft. (Note: The stamp first went on sale in Cape Canaveral, Florida on February 20, 1962, the same day as the first crewed orbital flight. On May 4, 2011, the Postal Service released a stamp commemorating the 50th anniversary of Freedom 7, the first flight of the project with people on board.)

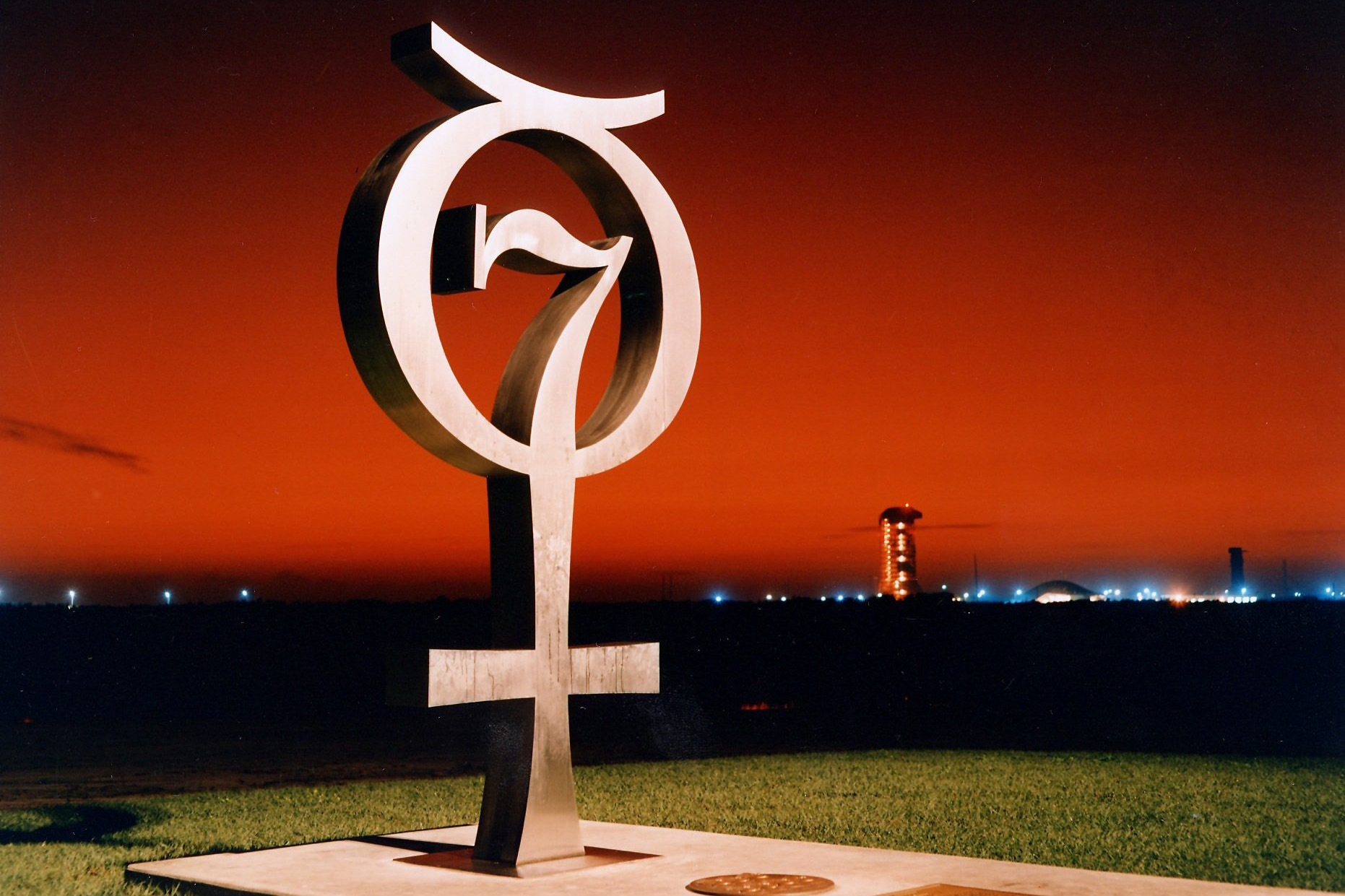
Mercury monument at Launch Complex 14, 1964

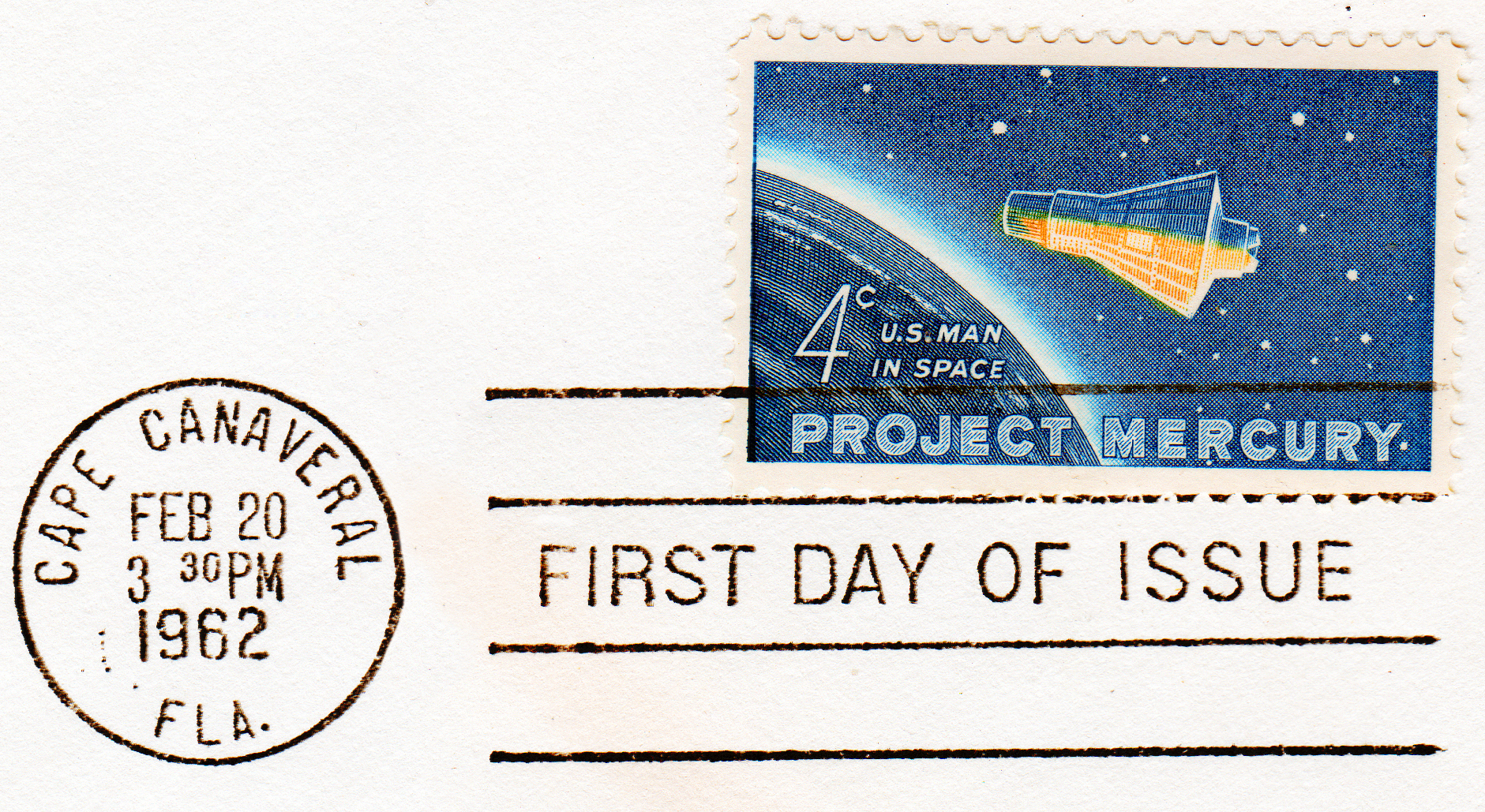
Commemorative Project Mercury 4¢ US Postage stamp (Note: The stamp was issued February 20, 1962, the day of John Glenn's flight in Friendship 7. This one has a First day of issue postmark from Cape Canaveral post office.)

=== Displays ===
The spacecraft that flew, together with some that did not, are on display in the United States. Friendship 7 (Spacecraft No. 13) went on a global tour, popularly known as its "fourth orbit".

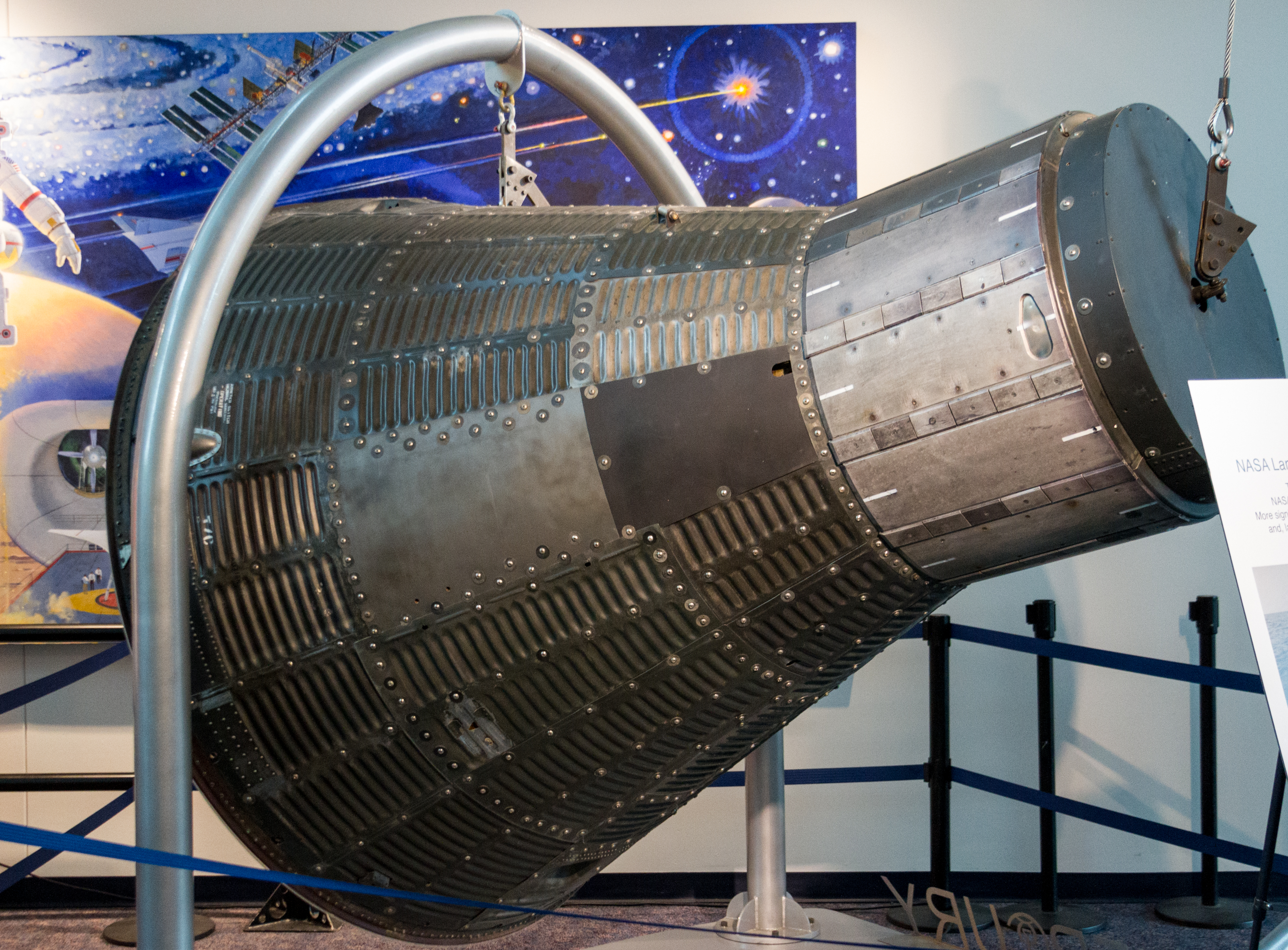
Little Joe 5B (Spacecraft No 14), Virginia Air and Space Center

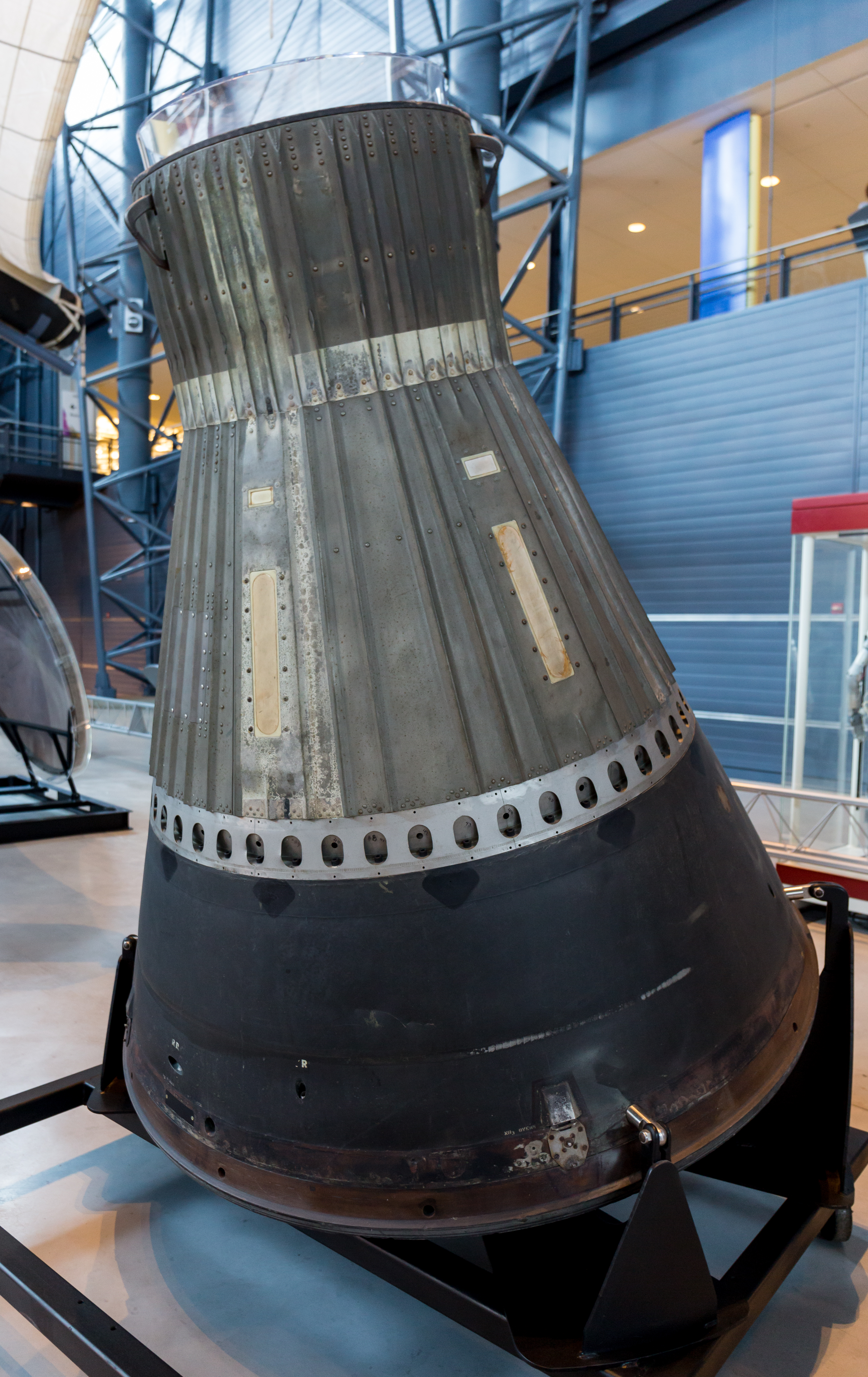
Big Joe Boilerplate, Steven F. Udvar-Hazy Center

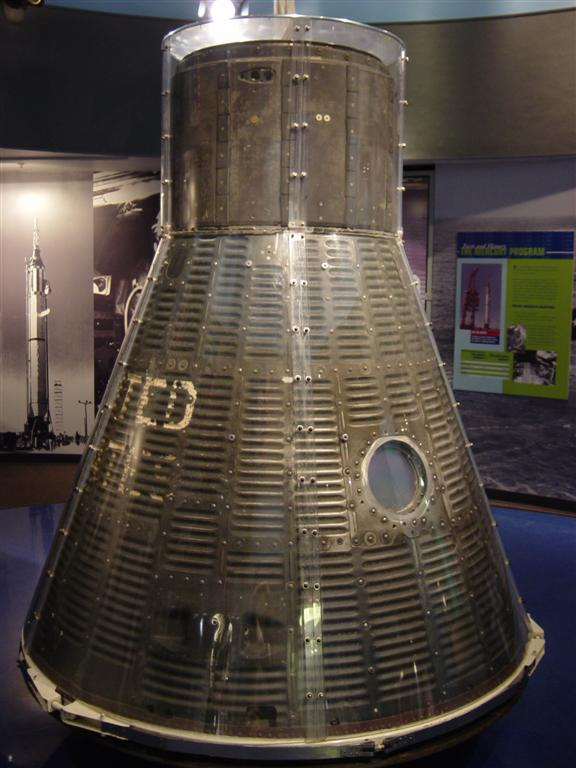
MR-1 & MR-1A (Spacecraft No 2), Kennedy Space Center

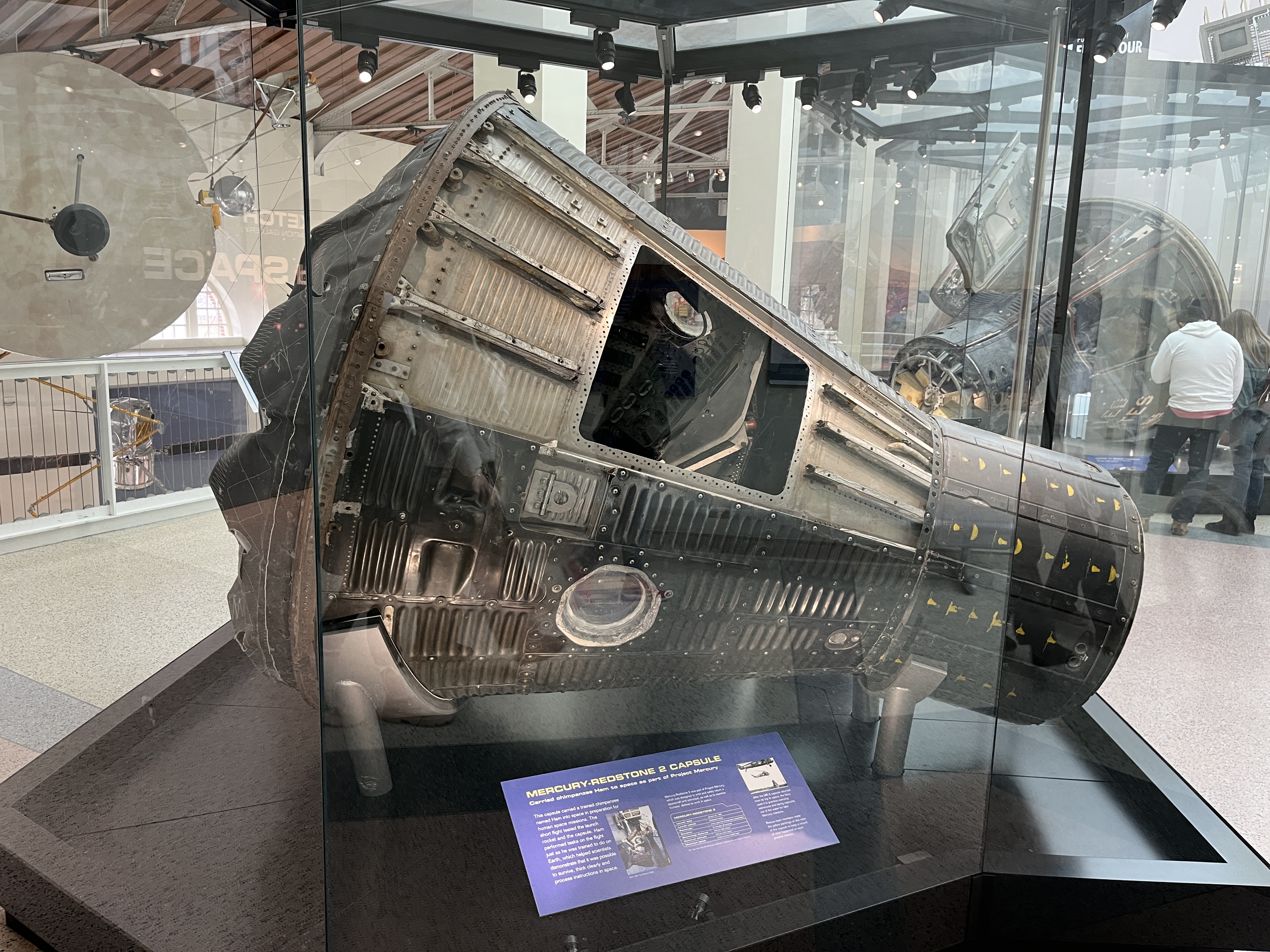
Mercury-Redstone 2 (Spacecraft No. 5), California Science Center

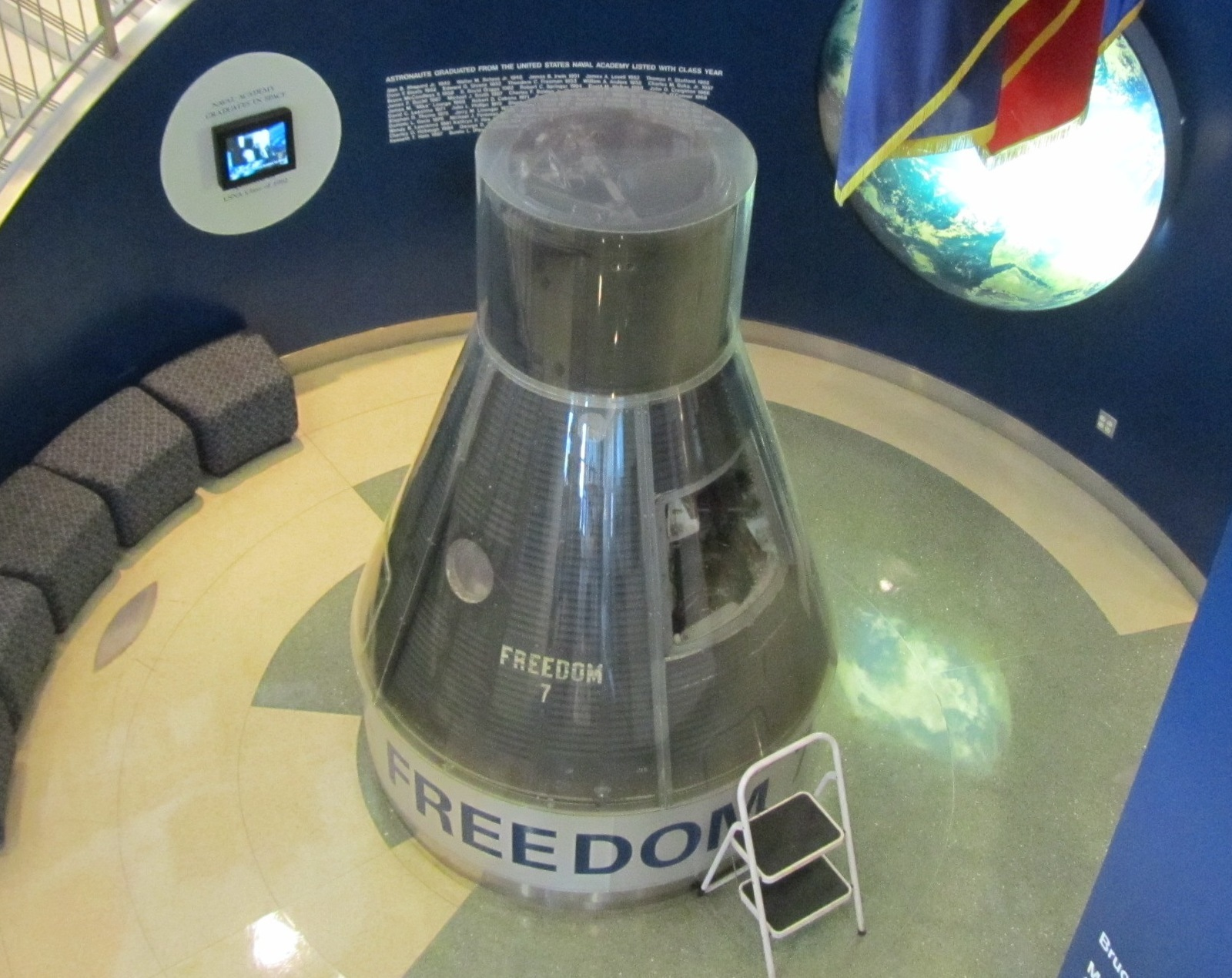
Freedom 7 (Spacecraft No. 7) at the United States Naval Academy, 2010

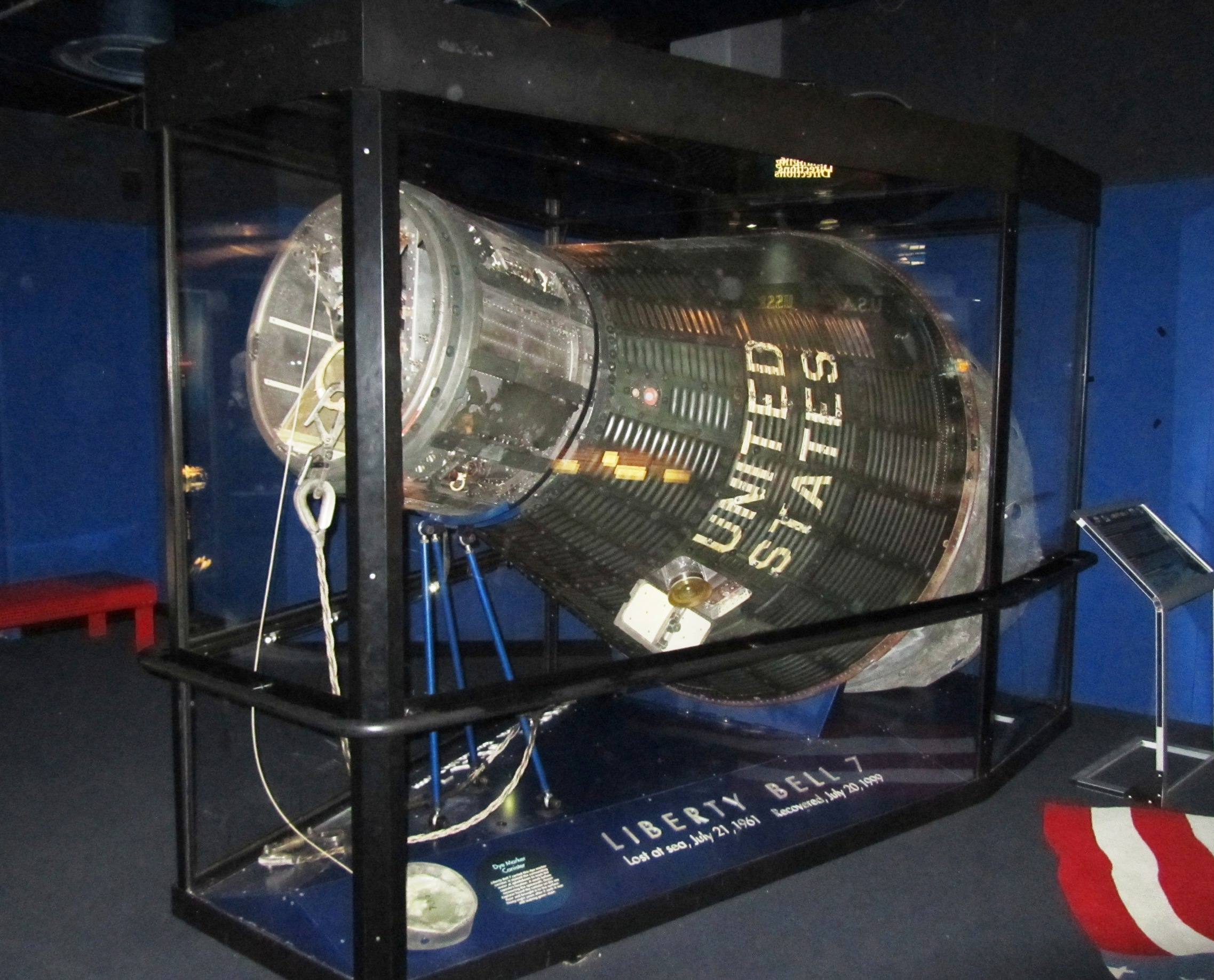
Liberty Bell 7 (Spacecraft No. 11) at the Kansas Cosmosphere and Space Center, 2010

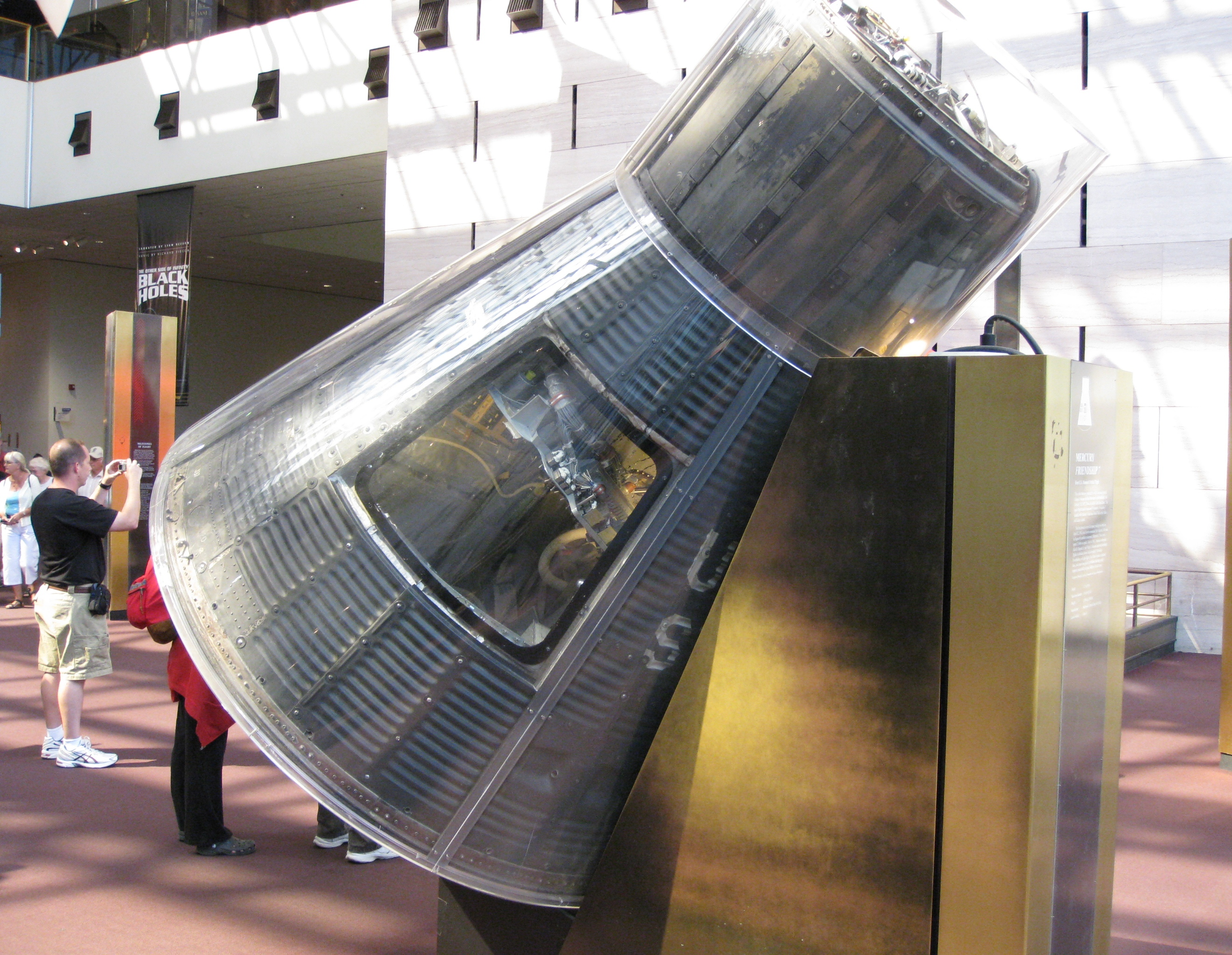
Friendship 7 (Spacecraft No. 13) at the National Air and Space Museum, 2009

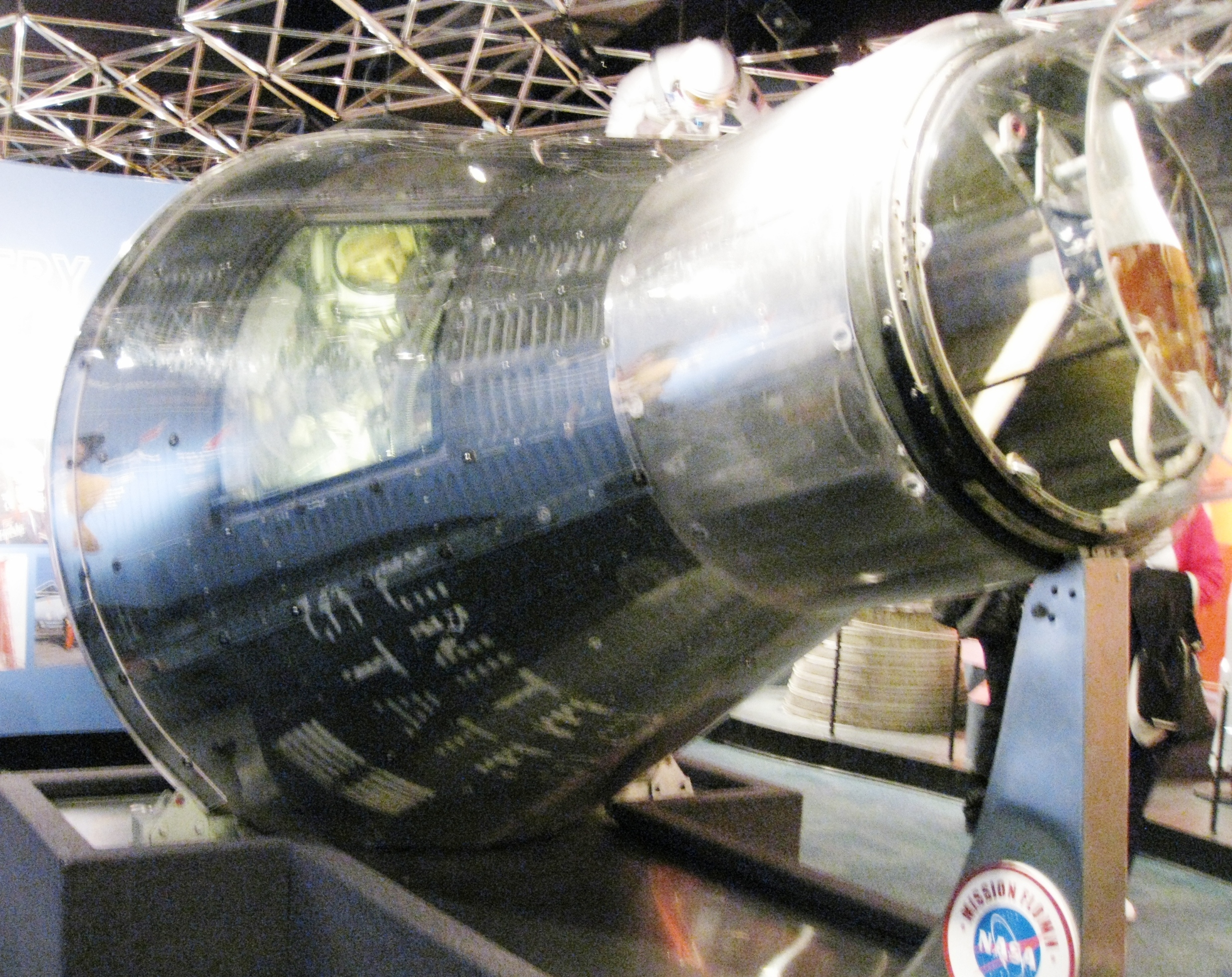
Aurora 7 (Spacecraft No. 18) at the Museum of Science and Industry, 2009

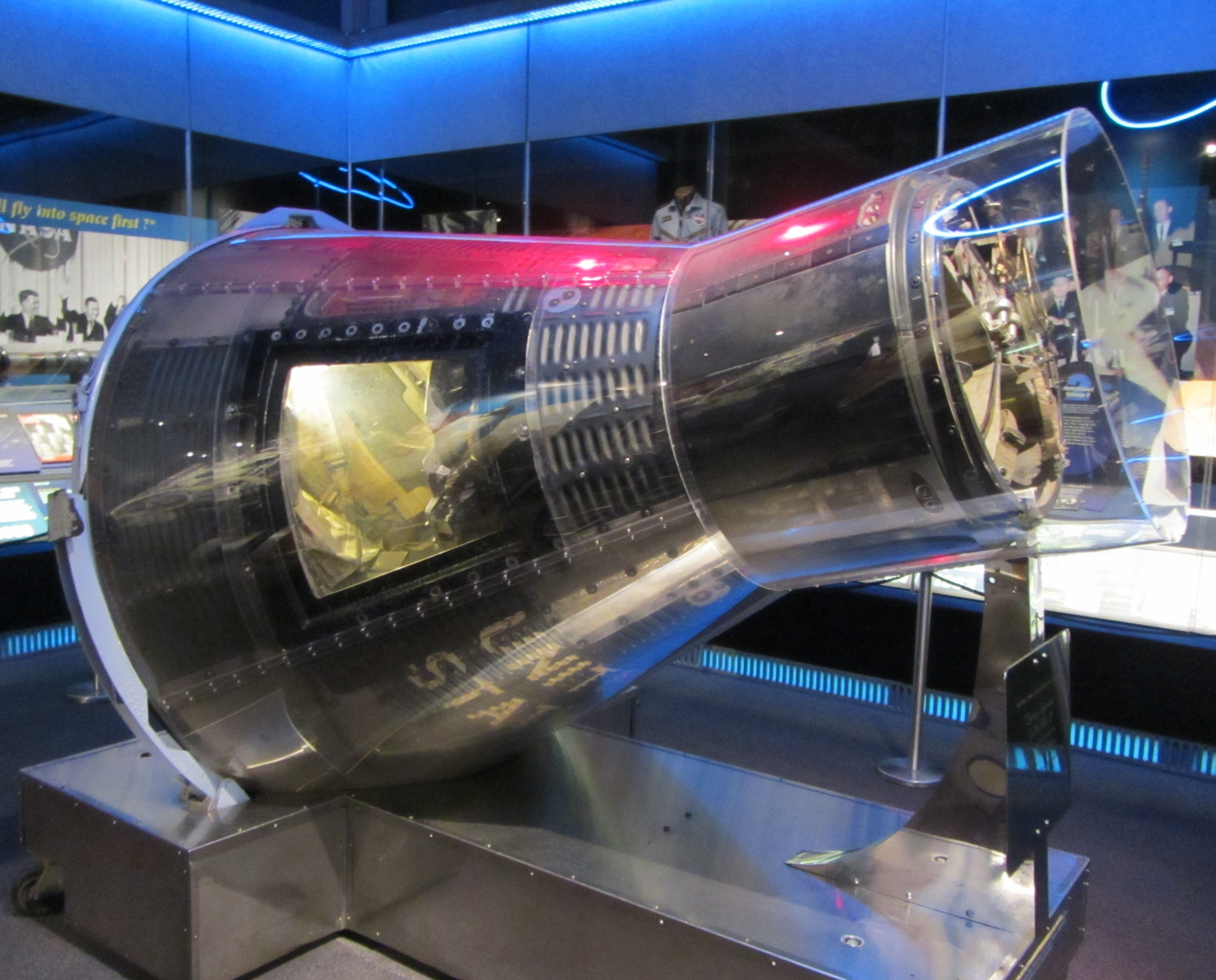
Sigma 7 (Spacecraft No. 16) at the United States Astronaut Hall of Fame, 2011

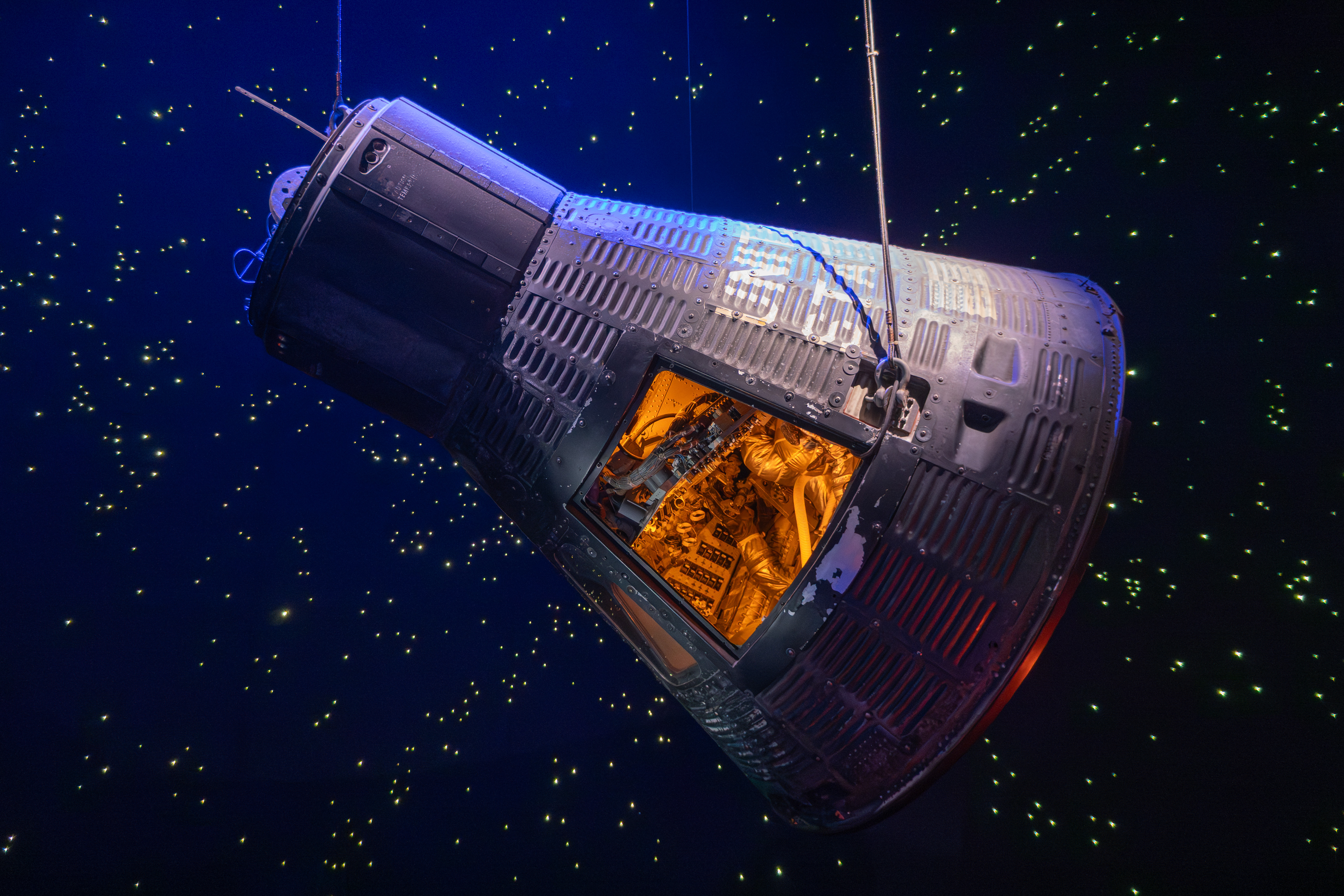
Faith 7 (Spacecraft No. 20) at Space Center Houston, 2011

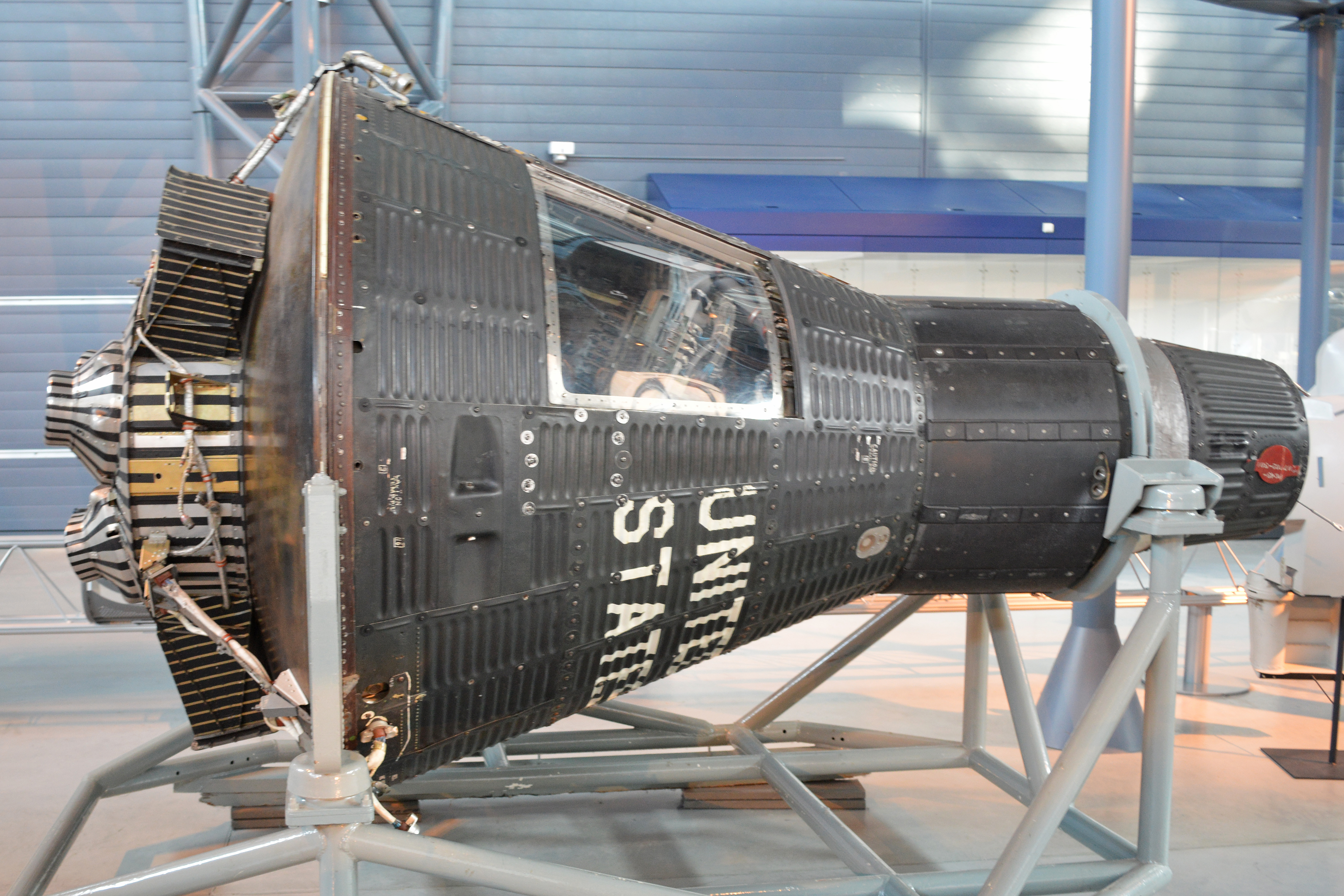
Unflown Freedom 7 II (Spacecraft No. 15B) at Steven F. Udvar-Hazy Center

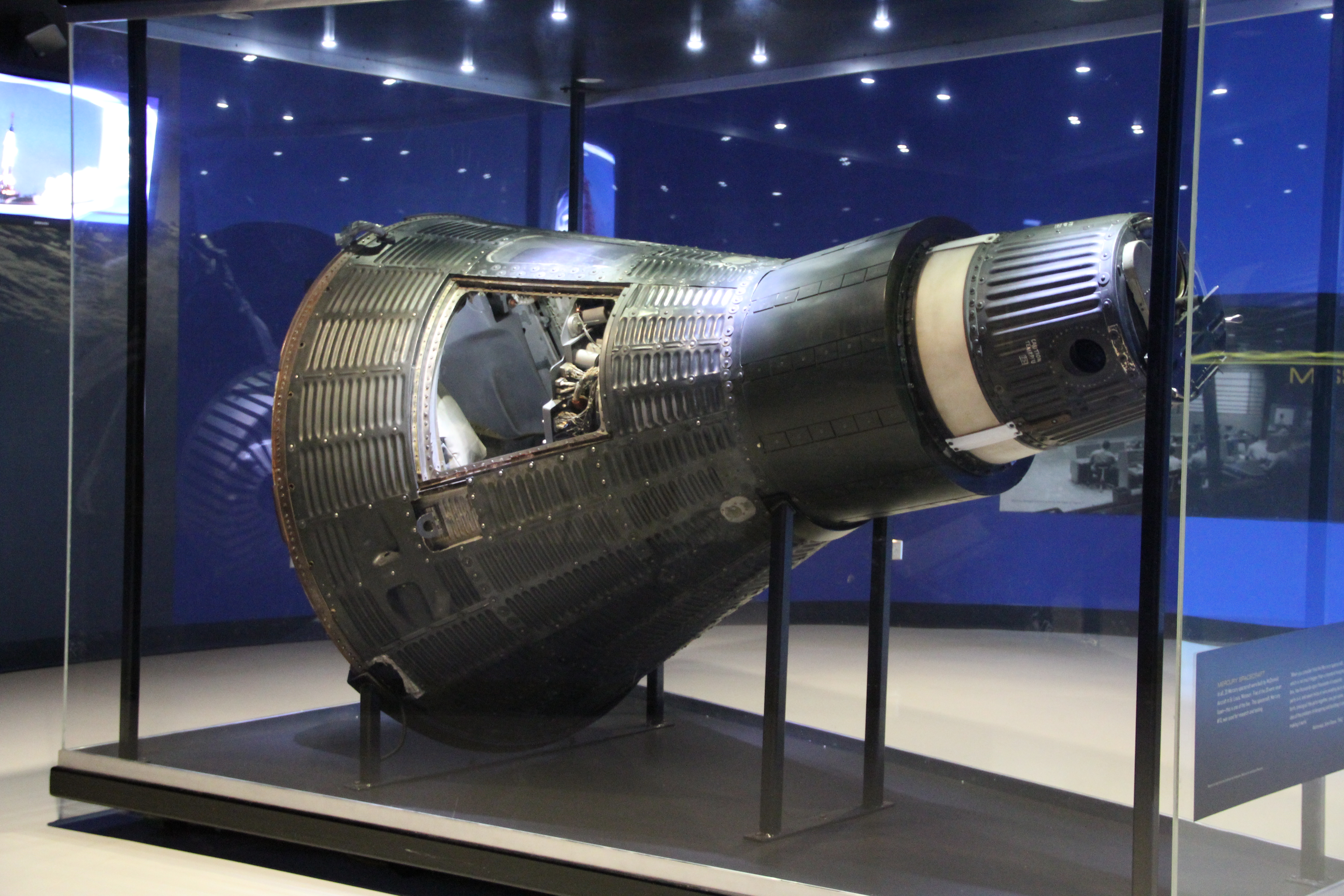
Unflown (Spacecraft No. 10), Evergreen Aviation & Space Museum

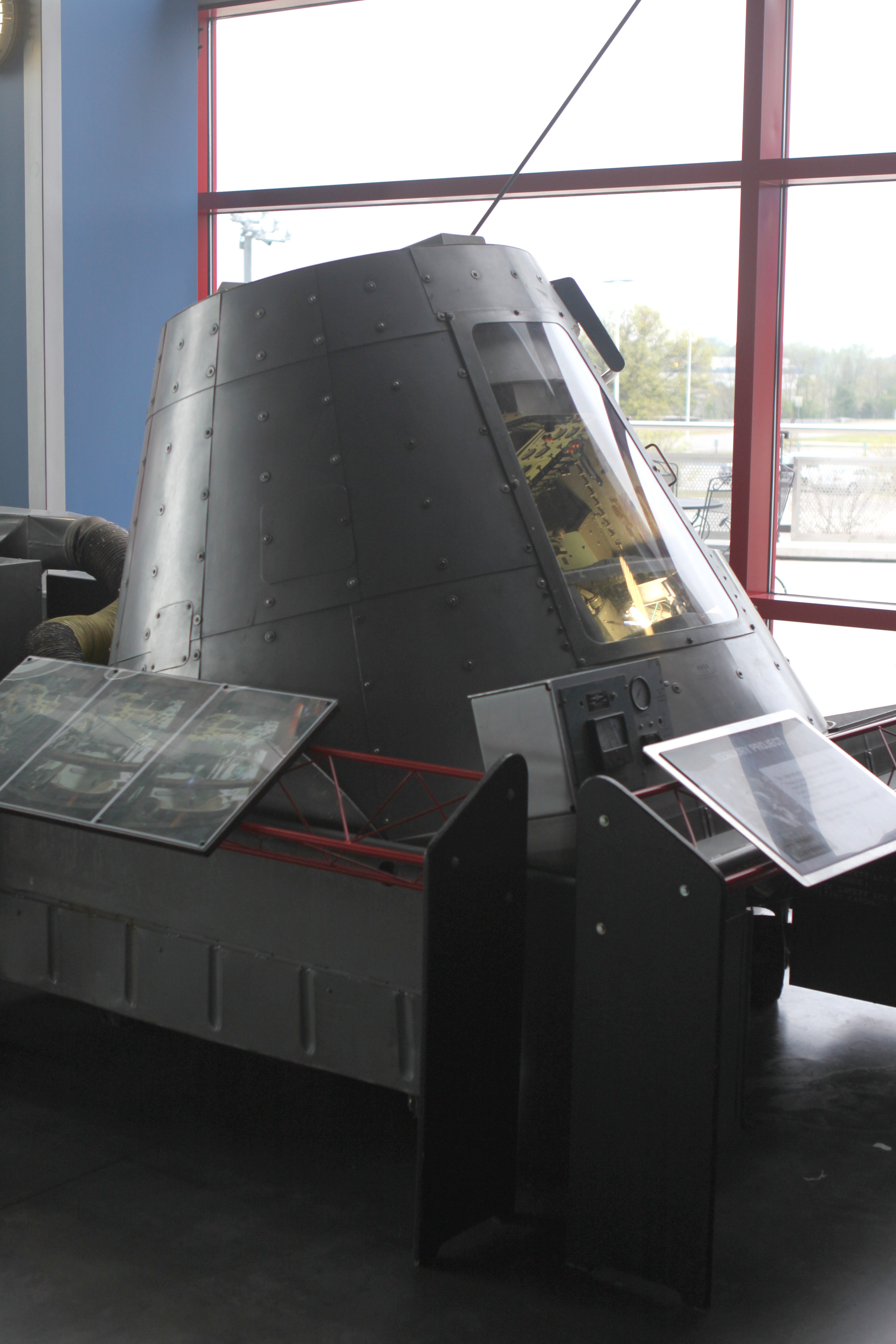
Mercury Procedures Trainer at the U.S. Space and Rocket Center, 2011

=== Patches ===
Commemorative patches were designed by entrepreneurs after the Mercury program to satisfy collectors. (Note: The only patches the Mercury astronauts wore were the NASA logo and a name tag. Each crewed Mercury spacecraft was painted black and decorated with a flight insignia, its call-sign, an American flag and the words United States.)

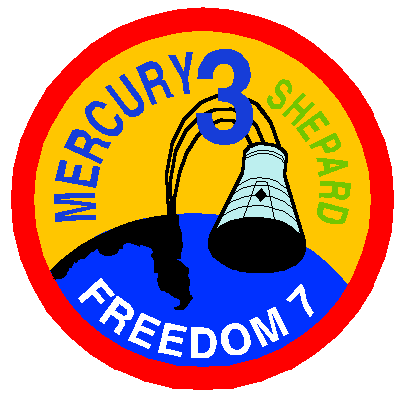

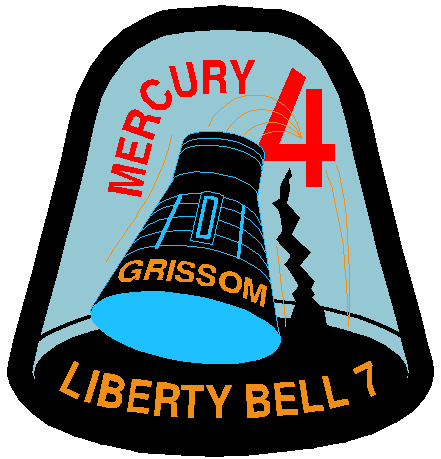

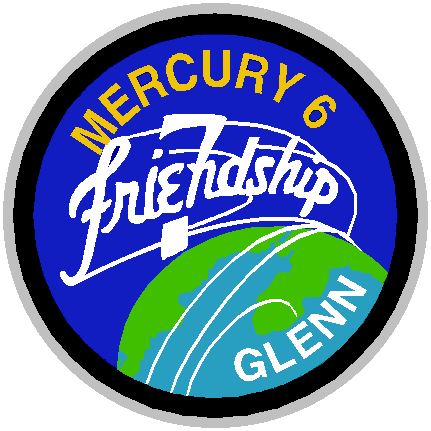

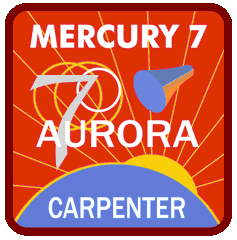

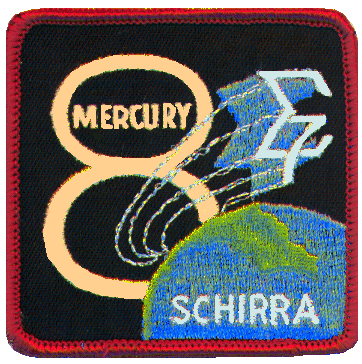

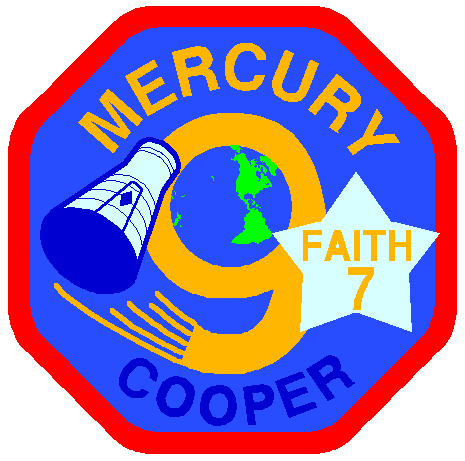

== Videos ==
John Glenn documentary from 50th Anniversary of Friendship 7, 2012.

== Space program comparison ==
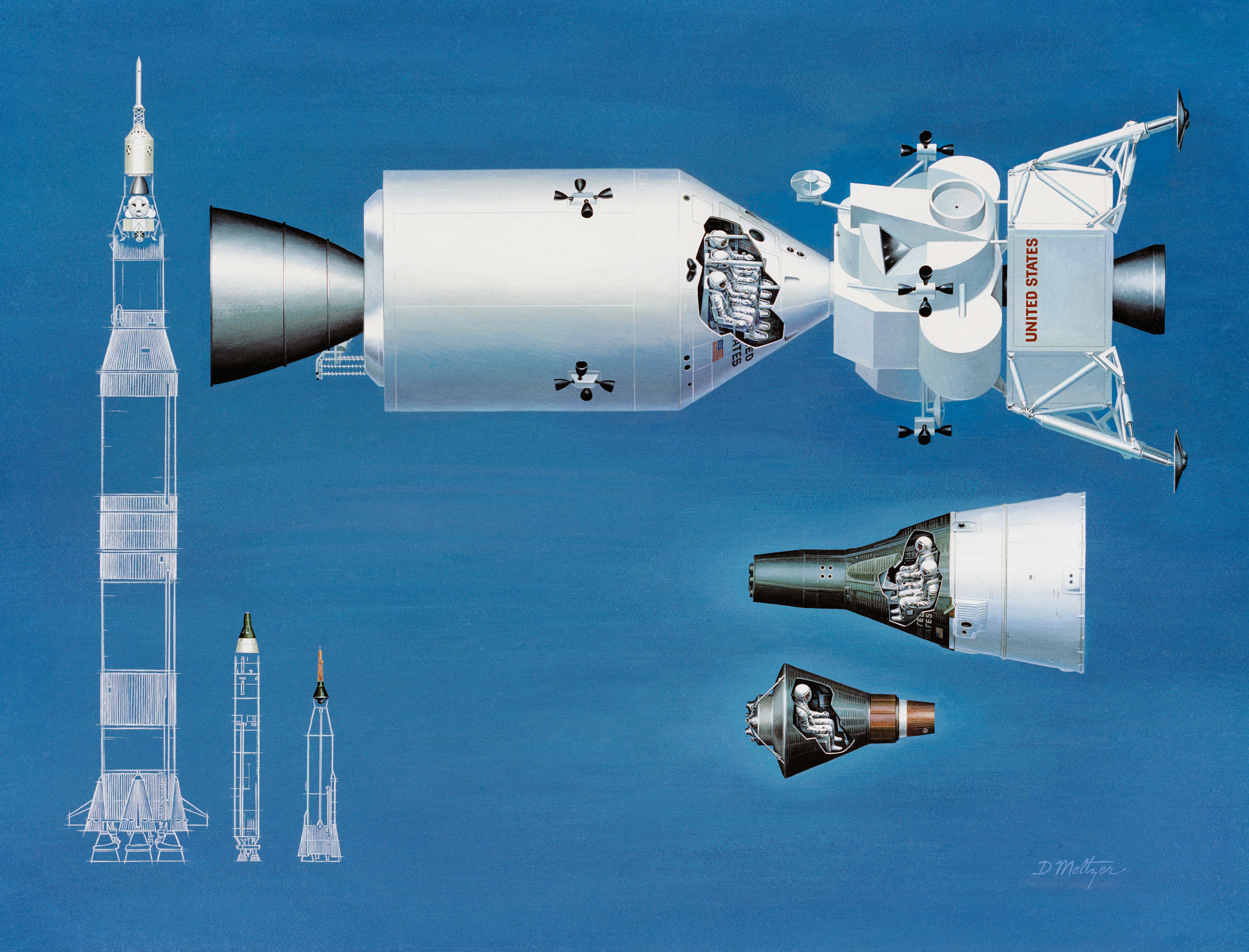
NASA illustration comparing boosters and spacecraft from Apollo (biggest), Gemini and Mercury (smallest).

== See also ==
- List of crewed spacecraft
- Julian Elvis Ward Jr.

== Bibliography ==
- Alexander, C. C.; Grimwood, J. M.; Swenson, L. S. (1966). This New Ocean: a History of Project Mercury (PDF). US: NASA. ISBN 1934941875.
- Cassutt, Michael; Slayton, Donald K. "Deke" (1994). Deke! U.S. Manned Space: From Mercury to the Shuttle (1st ed.). New York, US: Forge (St. Martin's Press). ISBN 0-312-85503-6.
- Catchpole, John (2001). Project Mercury - NASA's First Manned Space Programme. Chichester, UK: Springer Praxis. ISBN 1-85233-406-1.
- Gatland, Kenneth (1976). Manned Spacecraft (Second ed.). New York: Macmillan. p. 304.
- Giblin, Kelly A. (Spring 1998). "Fire in the Cockpit!". American Heritage of Invention & Technology. 13 (4). American Heritage Publishing. Archived from the original on November 20, 2008.
- Grimwood, James M. (1963). Project Mercury. A Chronology – NASA SP-4001. Washington DC, US: NASA.
- Hansen, James R. (2005). First Man: The Life of Neil A. Armstrong. Simon & Schuster. ISBN 0-7432-5631-X.
- Hollins, Hunter (March 11, 2013). "Forgotten hardware: how to urinate in a spacesuit". Advances in Physiology Education. 37 (1). American Physilogy Society: 123–128. doi:10.1152/advan.00175.2012. PMID 23728129.
- Kranz, Gene (2000). Failure Is Not an Option: Mission Control from Mercury to Apollo 13 and Beyond. New York: Berkley Books. ISBN 0-425-17987-7.
- Nelson, Craig (2009). Rocket Men: The Epic Story of the First Men on the Moon. New York, New York: Viking Penguin. ISBN 978-0-670-02103-1.
- Shesol, Jeff (2021). Mercury Rising: John Glenn, John Kennedy, and the New Battleground of the Cold War. New York: W.W. Norton. ISBN 978-1-324-00324-3.
- Siddiqi, Asif A. (2000). Challenge To Apollo: The Soviet Union and the Space Race, 1945-1974 (PDF). US: NASA. ISBN 1780393016. Archived from the original (PDF) on September 16, 2008.
- Unknown (1961). Results of the first U.S. manned suborbital space flight (PDF). US: NASA. Archived from the original (PDF) on January 31, 2014.
- Unknown (1961a). Results of the second U.S. manned suborbital space flight (PDF). US: NASA.
- Unknown (1962). Results of the first United States manned orbital space flight, 20 February 1962 (PDF). US: NASA. Archived from the original (PDF) on November 2, 2021.
- Wilford, John Noble (July 1969). We Reach the Moon. New York, US: Bantam Books.
- NASA (March 1988). "Computers in Spaceflight: The NASA Experience – Chapter One: The Gemini Digital Computer: First Machine in Orbit". NASA History. NASA.
- Rutter, Daniel (October 28, 2004). "Computers in space". Dan's Data.
- "Space flight chronology". IBM Archives. IBM. January 23, 2003. Archived from the original on January 19, 2005.
