= Little Joe 1A =

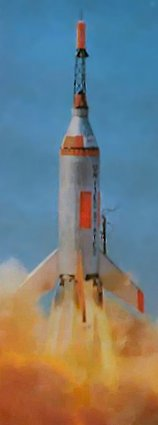
- Mission type: Abort test
- Operator: NASA
- Mission duration: 8 minutes, 11 seconds
- Distance travelled: 18.5 kilometres (11.5 mi)
- Apogee: 14 kilometres (9 mi)

Spacecraft properties
- Spacecraft type: Mercury boilerplate
- Manufacturer: McDonnell Aircraft
- Launch mass: 1,007 kilograms (2,220 lb)

Start of mission
- Launch date: November 4, 1959, 14:30 UTC
- Rocket: Little Joe
- Launch site: Wallops LA-1

End of mission
- Landing date: November 4, 1959, 14:38 UTC
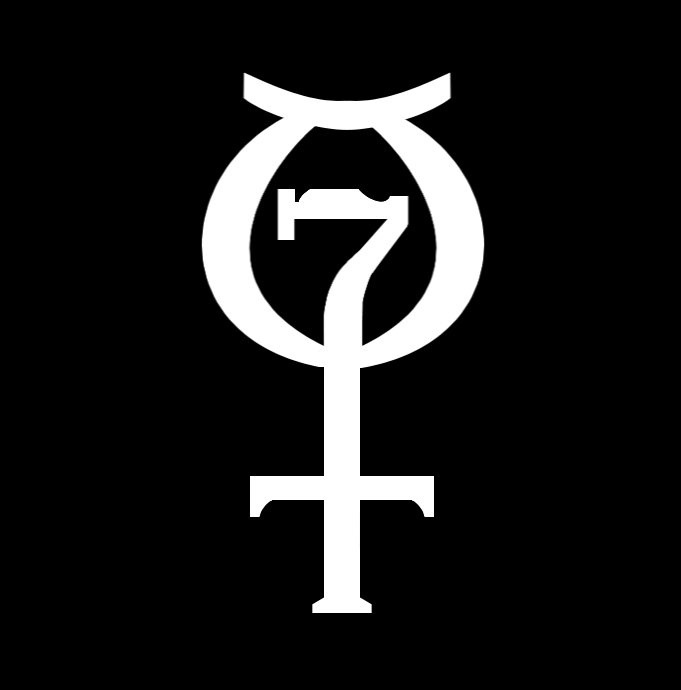
- Project Mercury; Abort Tests

Little Joe 1A (LJ-1A) was an uncrewed rocket launched as part of NASA's Mercury program on November 4, 1959. This flight, a repeat of the Little Joe 1 (LJ-1) launch, was to test a launch abort under high aerodynamic load conditions. After lift-off, the pressure sensing system was to indicate when the correct abort dynamic pressure was reached. This should have happened about thirty seconds after launch. A signal was sent to the explosive bolts to separate the spacecraft from the launch vehicle. Up to this point, everything was going as planned. The impulse was also intended to ignite the escape motor. The motor was ignited, but it took a number of seconds to build up thrust, and thus the abort maneuver was not accomplished at the desired dynamic pressure. Because of this, a repeat of the test was planned. Other events from launch through recovery occurred without incident. An altitude of 9 statute miles (14.5 km) and a range of 11.5 statute miles (18.5 km) were obtained, and a speed of 2,021.6 miles per hour (3,254 km/h) was reached. Flight time 8 minutes 11 seconds. Payload 1,007 kg.

== See also ==
- Little Joe
