= VSF =

VSF may refer to:

- Very Short Film Festival
- Victorian Soccer Federation
- Video Services Forum
- Virginia Science Festival
- Viscose staple fiber for textiles
