= Gemini SC-2 =

First reused space capsule

SC-2
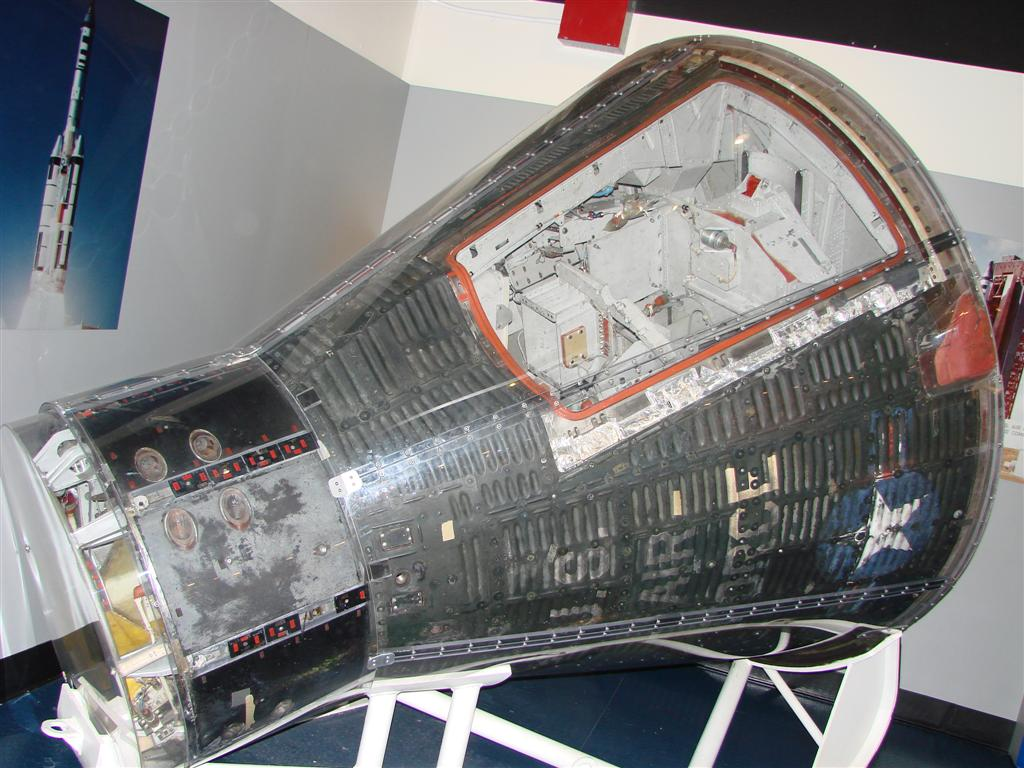
- Gemini SC-2 on display
- Type: Reentry capsule Test article
- Class: Gemini
- Manufacturer: McDonnell

History
- First flight: January 19, 1965; Gemini 2
- Last flight: November 3, 1966; OPS 0855
- Flights: 2

Gemini SC-2 (Spacecraft No. 2) was the second NASA Project Gemini full-up reentry capsule built. This McDonnell Gemini capsule was the first space capsule to be reused, flying twice in suborbital flights. SC-2 flew on Gemini 2 and OPS 0855 flights. The capsule is currently on display at the Air Force Space and Missile Museum at Cape Canaveral Air Force Station.

== Spacecraft history ==
The capsule is part of the collection of the National Air and Space Museum of the Smithsonian Institution.

On 19 January 1965, the Gemini 2 suborbital test mission was launched, with the second prototype Gemini capsule.

In March 1965, NASA approved the transfer of the Gemini 2 capsule to the USAF for modification into the first prototype of the Gemini B capsule.

On 3 November 1965, the first Manned Orbiting Laboratory (MOL) and Gemini B suborbital test mission was launched. It is the first capsule to ever be flown twice in space. Several Mercury capsules were used on multiple flights, including the capsule used on Mercury-Redstone 1 and Mercury-Redstone 1A, the Mercury capsule used on test flights Little Joe 5A and Little Joe 5B, and the Mercury capsule used on flights Mercury-Atlas 3 and Mercury Atlas 4, but none of these capsules surpassed the Kármán line on two separate flights. Thus, Gemini SC-2 became the only reentry capsule of the United States to be reflown in space before SpaceX's Dragon.

The capsule was transferred to the Smithsonian Institution, as part of the National Air and Space Museum collection.

A mock-up of the Gemini B capsule was put on display in the Allan and Malcolm Lockheed and Glenn Martin Space Gallery at the National Museum of the USAF in 2016.

The flown Gemini SC-2 capsule was put on display in the exhibit hall of the Air Force Space and Missile Museum of the USAF in 2017.

== Flight history ==
Flight No.	Mission	Launch date (UTC)	Launch	Landing	Notes
1	Gemini 2	19 January 1965			NASA Mission
2	OPS 0855	3 November 1966			USAF Mission; first reflight of a previously flown reentry capsule

== See also ==
- Falcon 9 booster B1021 – the first Falcon 9 first stage booster to be reused for a space launch mission
- McDonnell Douglas DC-X – Prototype single-stage-to-orbit rocket developed & flown between 1991-1996
- New Shepard – Rocket developed by Blue Origin
- SpaceShipOne – American experimental spaceplane
- Dragon C106 – the first Dragon capsule to be reused for a spaceflight mission
