= Little Joe 2 =

Equipment and biology test flight during Project Mercury

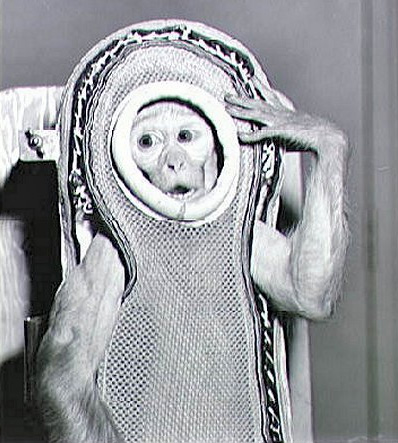
- Sam, the rhesus monkey flown aboard Little Joe 2
- Mission type: Abort test
- Operator: NASA
- Mission duration: 11 minutes, 6 seconds
- Distance travelled: 312 kilometres (194 mi)
- Apogee: 85 kilometres (53 mi)

Spacecraft properties
- Spacecraft type: Mercury boilerplate
- Manufacturer: McDonnell Aircraft
- Launch mass: 1,007 kilograms (2,220 lb)

Start of mission
- Launch date: December 4, 1959, 16:20 UTC
- Rocket: Little Joe
- Launch site: Wallops LA-1

End of mission
- Landing date: December 4, 1959, 16:31 UTC
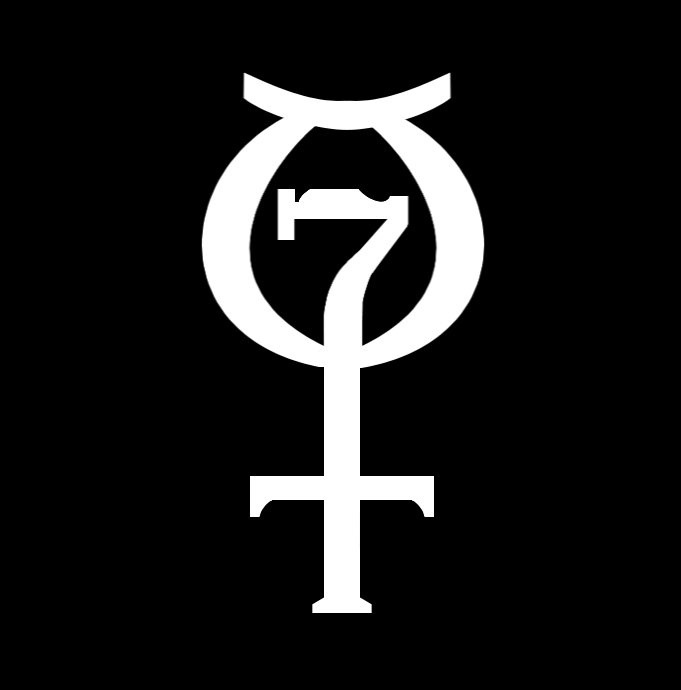
- Project Mercury; Abort Tests

The Little Joe 2 was a test of the Mercury space capsule, carrying the rhesus monkey Sam (Macaca mulatta) close to the edge of space. He was sent to test the space equipment and the adverse effects of space on humans.

The flight was launched December 4, 1959, at 11:15 a.m. ET from Wallops Island, Virginia, United States. Little Joe 2 flew to an altitude of 55 miles (88 km). It was recovered with the monkey intact and alive in the Atlantic Ocean by the USS Borie. Sam was one of a series of monkeys in space. Sam, from the School of Aviation Medicine in San Antonio, Texas, received his name as an acronym of the facility. Sam experienced up to 12Gs and three minutes of weightlessness. The flight time was 11 minutes, 6 seconds, with a payload of 1,007 kg.

The boilerplate Mercury spacecraft used in the Little Joe 2 mission is currently displayed at Airpower Park and Museum, Hampton, Virginia.

== See also ==
- Little Joe (rocket)
- Miss Sam, NASA Project Mercury rhesus monkey
- Albert II, rhesus monkey who became the first primate and first mammal in space on June 14, 1949
- Splashdown
- List of individual monkeys
