= Little Joe 5A =

Uncrewed test launch of a Mercury capsule

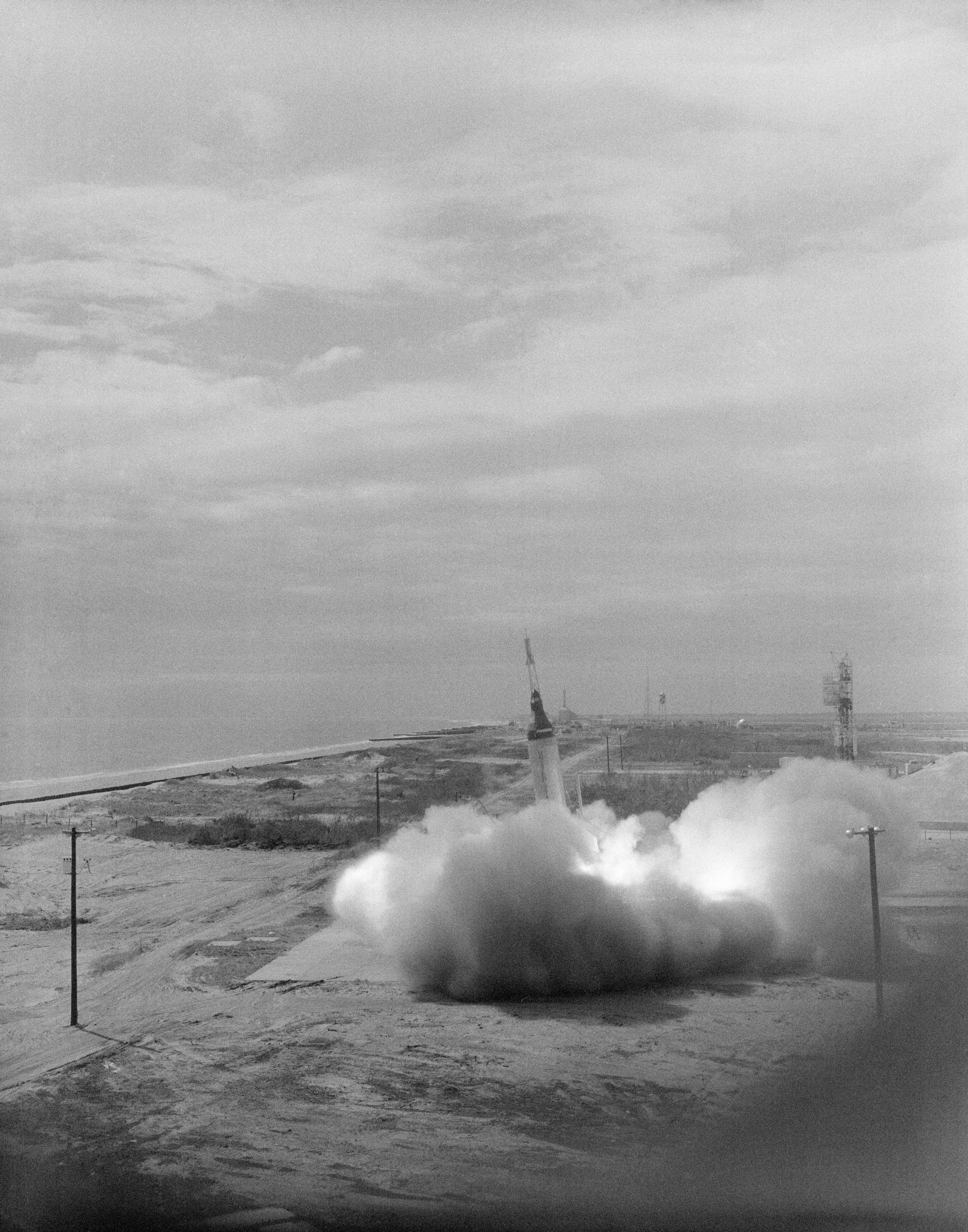
- Little Joe 5A being launched from Wallops Island
- Mission type: Abort test
- Operator: NASA
- Mission duration: 5 minutes, 25 seconds
- Distance travelled: 29 kilometres (18 mi)
- Apogee: 12.4 kilometres (7.7 mi)

Spacecraft properties
- Spacecraft: Mercury No.14
- Manufacturer: McDonnell Aircraft
- Launch mass: 1,141 kilograms (2,515 lb)

Start of mission
- Launch date: March 18, 1961, 16:49 UTC
- Rocket: Little Joe
- Launch site: Wallops LA-1

End of mission
- Landing date: March 18, 1961, 16:54 UTC
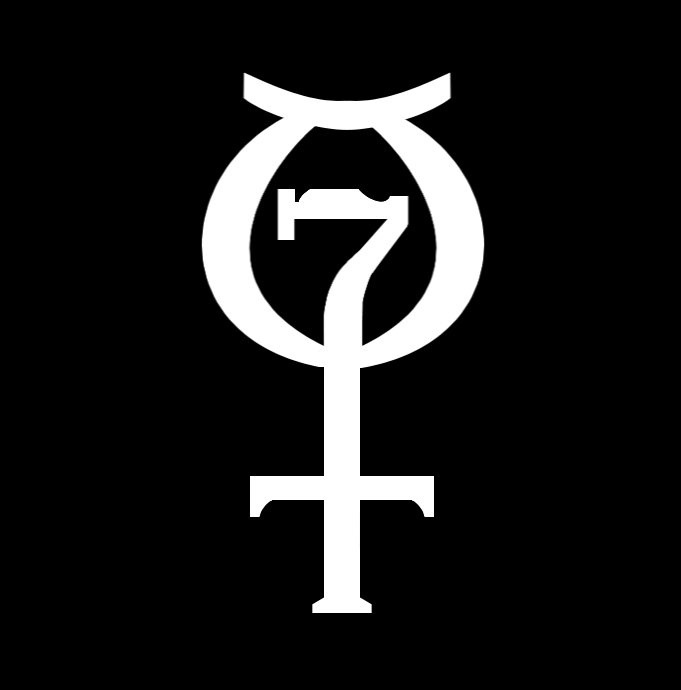
- Project Mercury; Abort Tests

Little Joe 5A was an uncrewed launch escape system test of the Mercury spacecraft, launched March 18, 1961, from Wallops Island, Virginia as part of the U.S. Mercury program in a second attempt of the failed Little Joe 5 flight. The mission used production Mercury spacecraft #14 atop a Little Joe booster rocket. The rocket flew to an altitude of 7.7 miles (12 km) and a range of 18 miles (29 km), lasting 5 minutes 25 seconds; maximum speed was 1,783 miles per hour (2,869 km/h) and acceleration was 8 G (78 m/s²). Unfortunately, the LJ-5 failure sequence was repeated when capsule escape rocket again ignited prematurely with the capsule remaining attached to the booster. In this flight however, a ground command was sent to separate the capsule from the booster and escape tower; this allowed the parachutes to deploy, and the capsule was recovered with only minor damage.

The spacecraft used in this mission was used again on the subsequent Little Joe 5B mission, in a third attempt to achieve mission objectives. It is currently displayed at the Virginia Air and Space Center, Hampton, Virginia.
