= Little Joe 1B =

1960 launch escape system test in the U.S. Mercury program

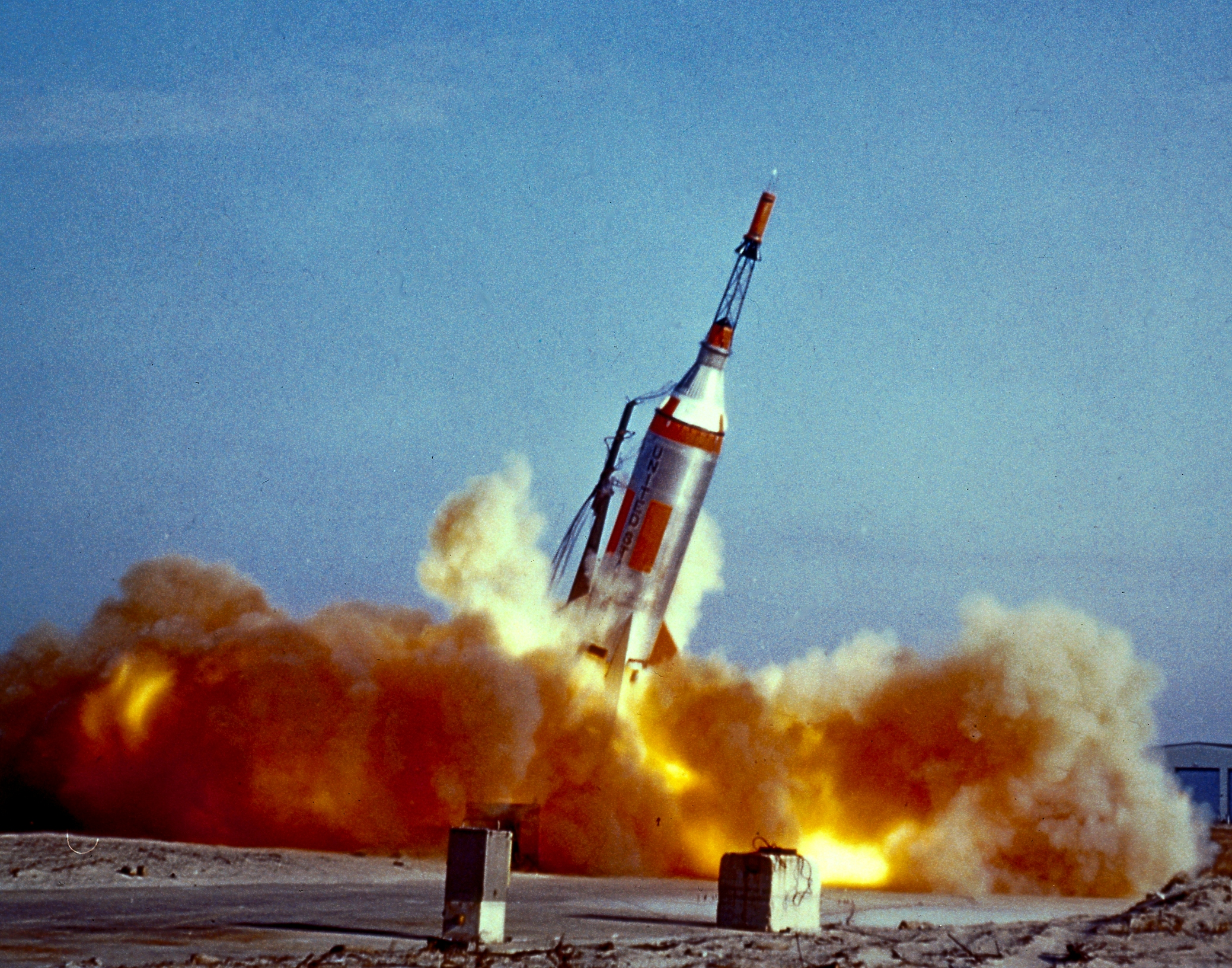
- Little Joe 1B launches from Wallops Flight Facility on January 21, 1960.
- Mission type: Abort test
- Operator: NASA
- Mission duration: 8 minutes, 35 seconds
- Distance travelled: 19 kilometres (12 mi)
- Apogee: 14 kilometres (9 mi)

Spacecraft properties
- Spacecraft type: Mercury boilerplate
- Manufacturer: McDonnell Aircraft
- Launch mass: 1,007 kilograms (2,220 lb)

Start of mission
- Launch date: January 21, 1960, 14:23 UTC
- Rocket: Little Joe
- Launch site: Wallops LA-1

End of mission
- Landing date: January 21, 1960, 14:31 UTC
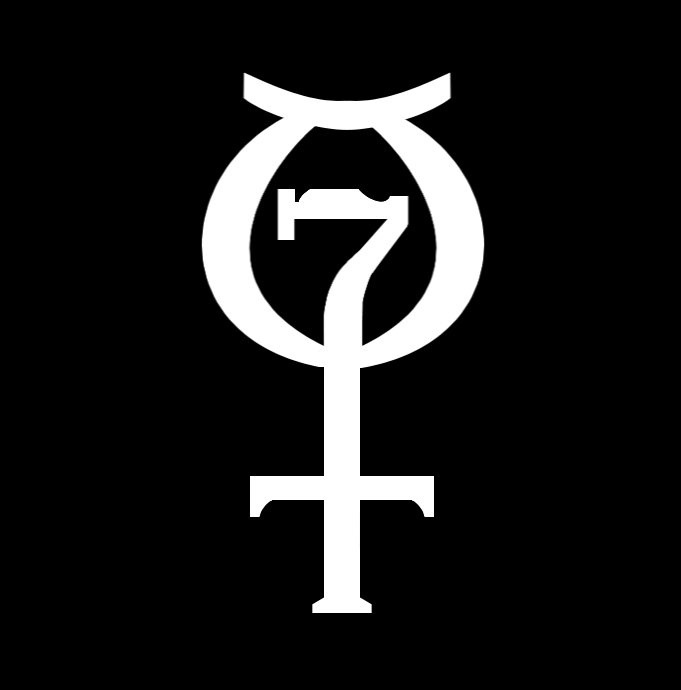
- Project Mercury; Abort Tests

The Little Joe 1B was a launch escape system test of the Mercury spacecraft, conducted as part of the U.S. Mercury program. The mission also carried a female rhesus monkey (Macaca mulatta) named Miss Sam in the Mercury spacecraft. The mission was launched January 21, 1960, from Wallops Island, Virginia. The Little Joe 1B flew to an apogee of 9.3 statute miles (15.0 km) and a range of 11.7 miles (18.9 km) out to sea. Miss Sam survived the 8 minute 35 second flight in good condition. The spacecraft was recovered by a Marine helicopter and returned to Wallops Island within about 45 minutes. Miss Sam was one of many monkeys used in space travel research.

== Gallery ==
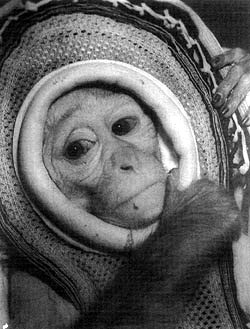
Miss Sam, the Rhesus Monkey

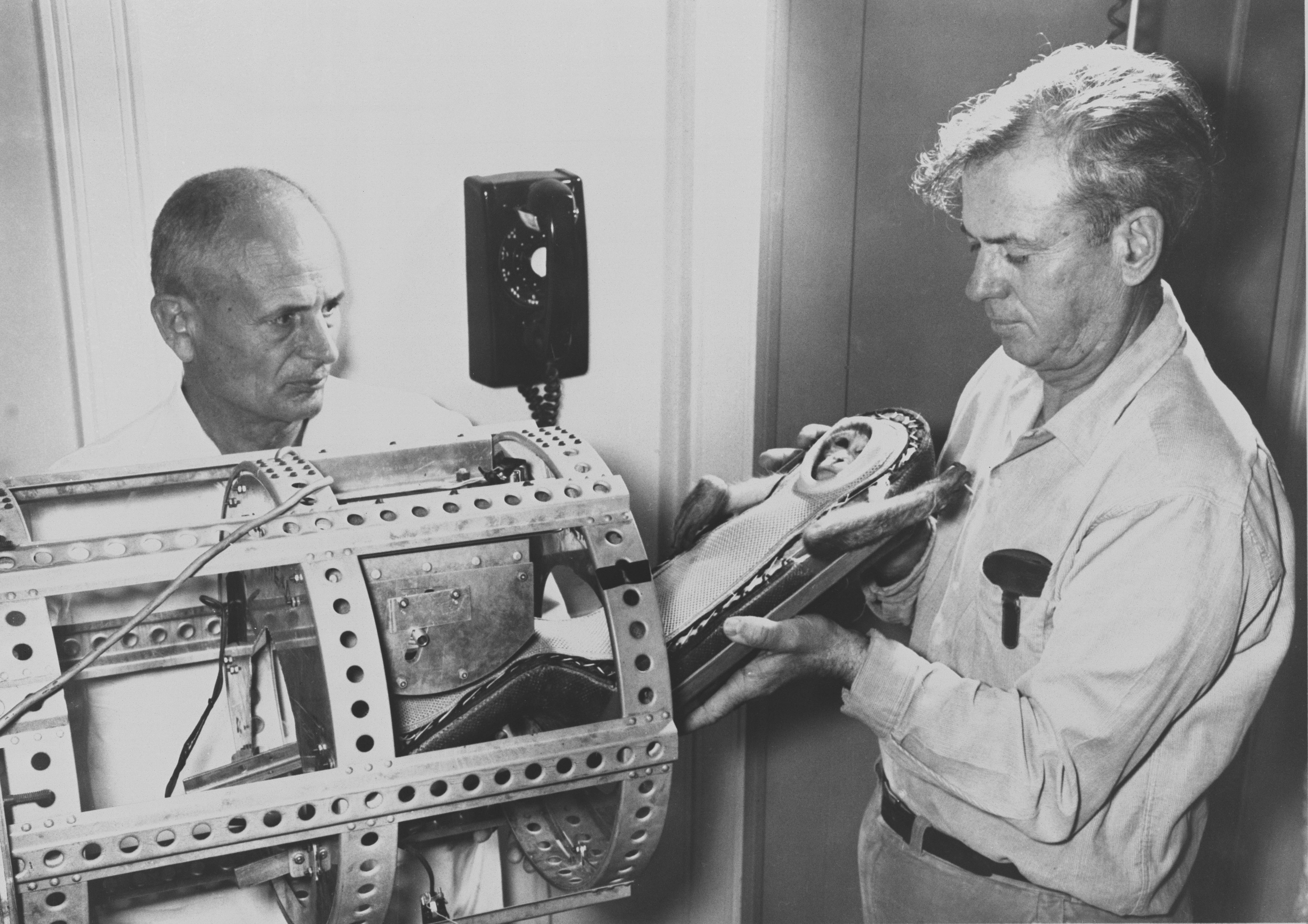
Miss Sam, with fiberglass couch, being placed in a container for the Little Joe 1B flight

== See also ==
- Little Joe
- Sam (monkey), NASA Project Mercury rhesus monkey
- Monkeys and apes in space
- List of individual monkeys
