= Little Joe 6 =

Early Mercury System Test

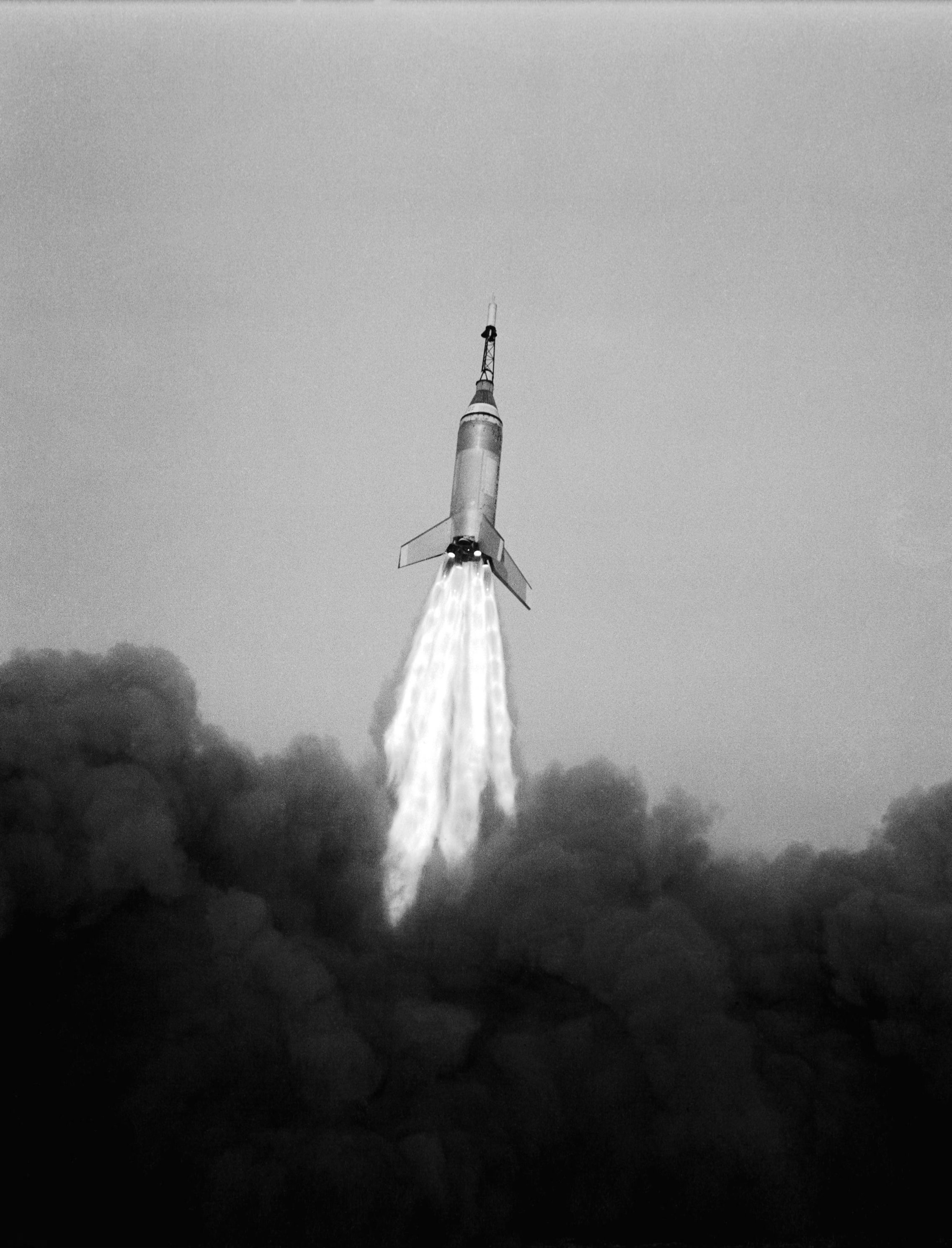
- Little Joe 6 launch Oct. 4, 1959
- Mission type: Abort test
- Operator: NASA
- Mission duration: 5 minutes, 10 seconds
- Distance travelled: 127 kilometres (79 mi)
- Apogee: 60 kilometres (37 mi)

Spacecraft properties
- Spacecraft type: Mercury boilerplate
- Manufacturer: McDonnell Aircraft
- Launch mass: 1,134 kilograms (2,500 lb)

Start of mission
- Launch date: October 4, 1959, 10:00 UTC
- Rocket: Little Joe
- Launch site: Wallops LA-1

End of mission
- Landing date: October 4, 1959, 10:05 UTC
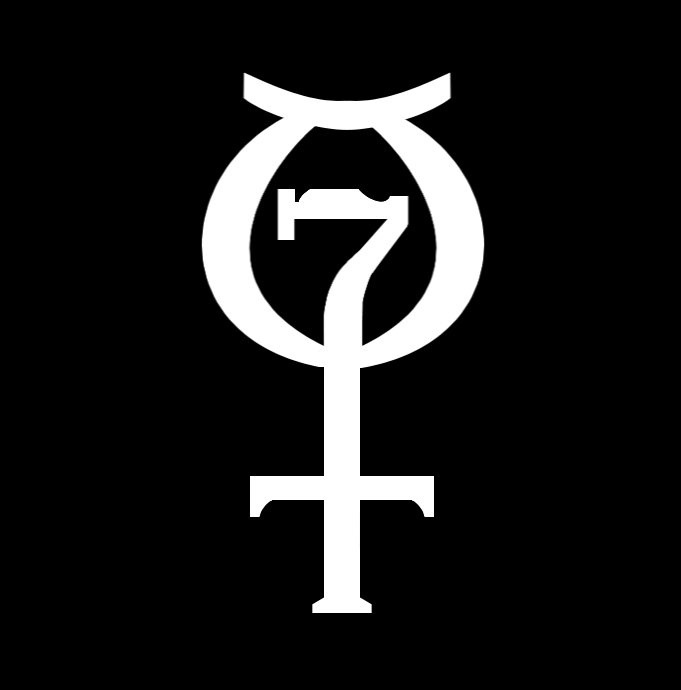
- Project Mercury; Abort Tests

The Little Joe 6 was a launch escape system test of the Mercury spacecraft, conducted as part of the U.S. Mercury program. The mission used a boilerplate Mercury spacecraft. The mission was launched October 4, 1959, from Wallops Island, Virginia. The Little Joe 6 flew to an apogee of 60 kilometres (37 mi) and a range of 127 kilometres (79 mi). The mission lasted 5 minutes 10 seconds. Maximum speed was 1,375 metres per second (3,075 mph) and acceleration was 5.9 g (58 m/s²). Payload 1,134 kilograms (2,500 lb).

== See also ==
- Little Joe
- Boilerplate (spaceflight)
