= Little Joe (rocket) =

NASA Project Mercury capsule qualification test booster rocket

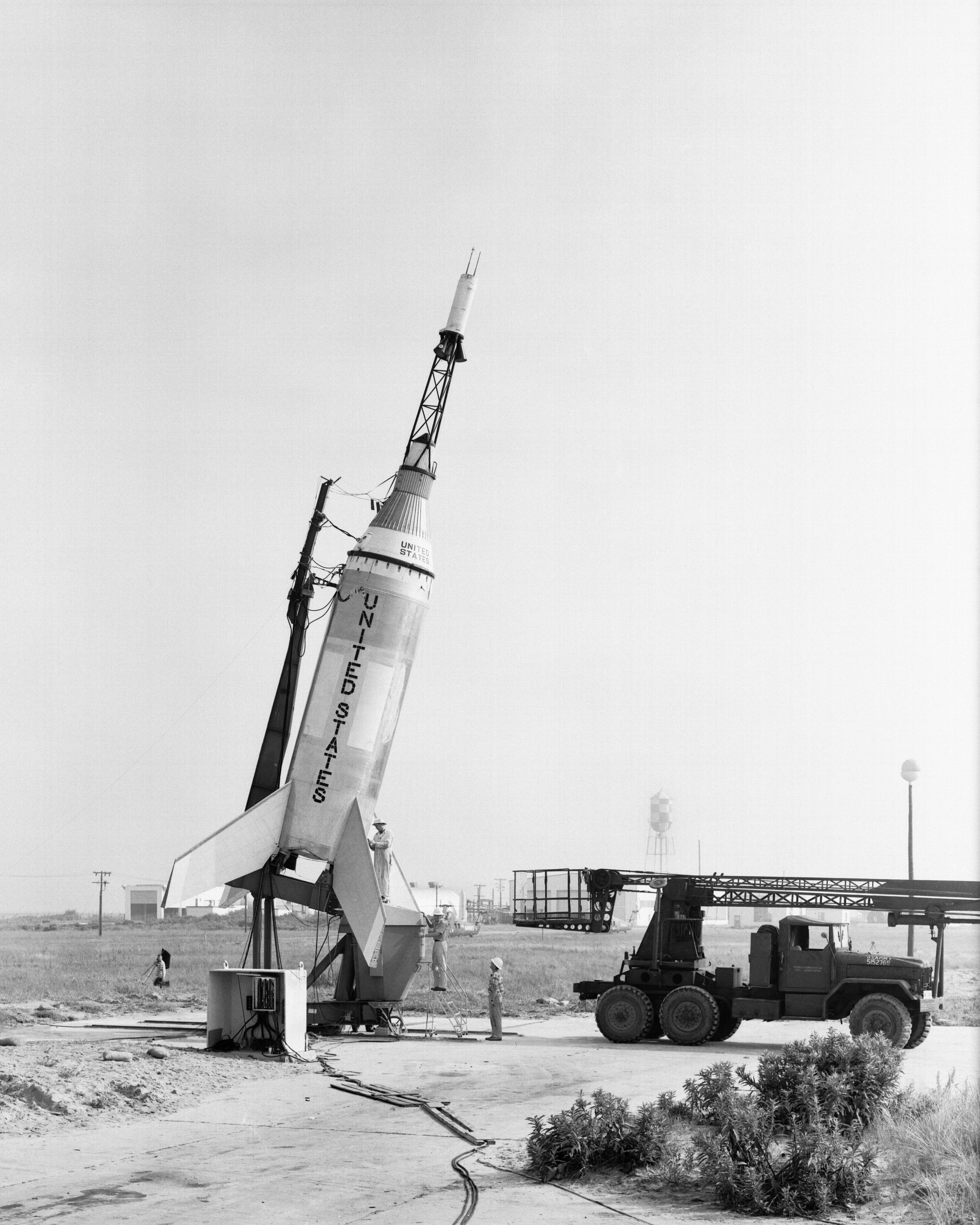
- The Little Joe 1 launch vehicle with Mercury capsule, August 1959.
- Function: Uncrewed capsule testing
- Manufacturer: North American Aviation
- Country of origin: United States

Size
- Height: 17 m (55 ft)
- Stages: 2

Capacity

Payload to suborbital
- Mass: 1,400 kg (3,000 lb)

Launch history
- Status: Retired
- Launch sites: Wallops Island
- Total launches: 8
- Success(es): 6
- Failure: 2

Boosters
- Powered by: Recruit rockets
- Maximum thrust: 668 kN (150,000 lb_{f})
- Burn time: 1.53 seconds
- Propellant: solid

First stage – Sustainer
- Powered by: Castor
- Maximum thrust: 1,036 kN (233,000 lb_{f})
- Burn time: 37 seconds
- Propellant: Solid

Little Joe was a solid-fueled booster rocket used by NASA for eight launches from 1959 to 1961 from Wallops Island, Virginia to test the launch escape system and heat shield for Project Mercury capsules, as well as the name given to the test program using the booster. The first rocket designed solely for crewed spacecraft qualifications, Little Joe was also one of the pioneer operational launch vehicles using the rocket cluster principle.

The Little Joe name has been attributed to Maxime Faget at NASA's Langley Research Center in Hampton, Virginia. He based the name on four large fins, which reminded him of a slang term for a roll of four in craps.

A successor, Little Joe II, was used for flight testing of the Apollo launch escape system from 1963 to 1966.

== Background ==
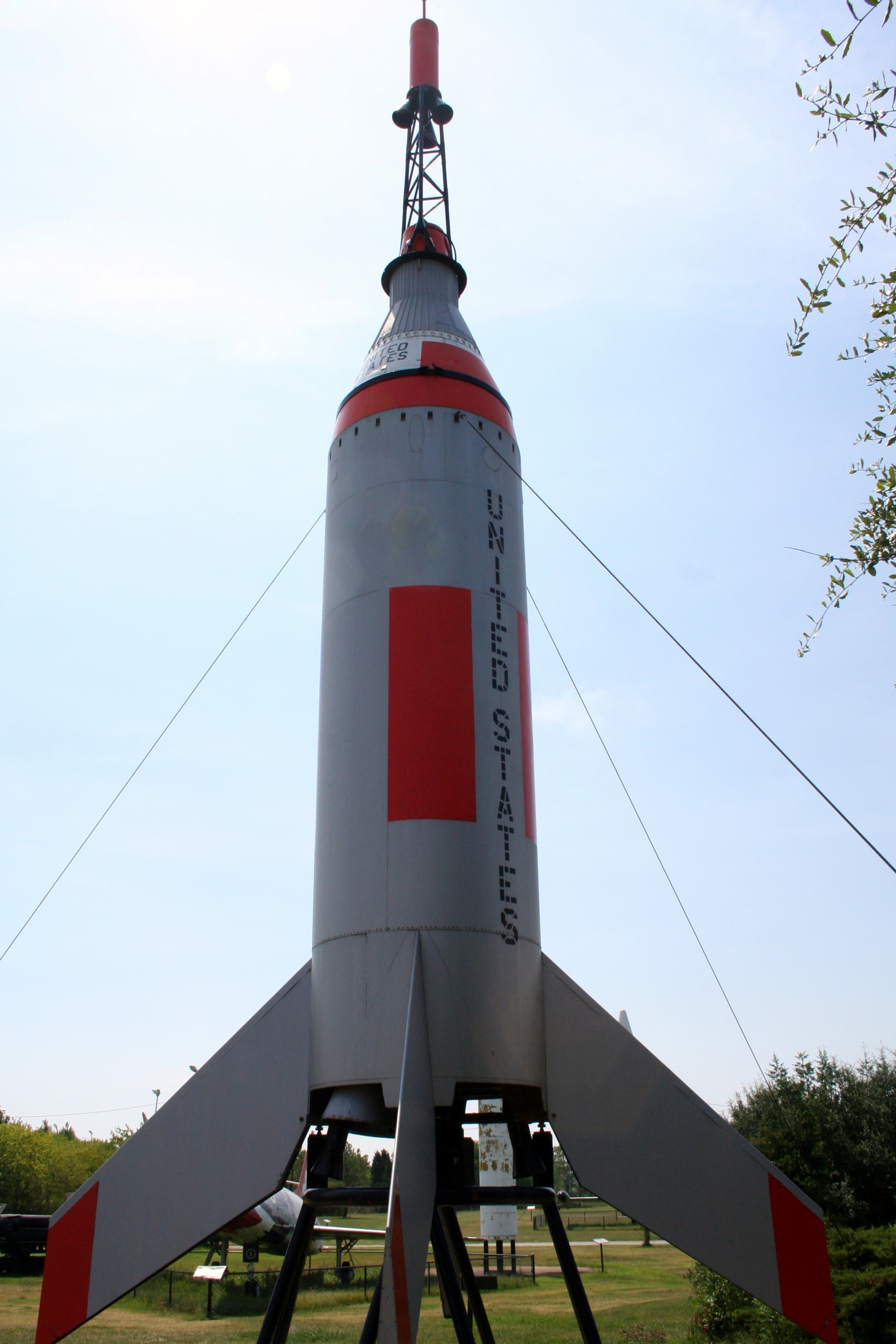
An unflown Little Joe booster (backup for LJ-2) along with the boilerplate capsule on display at the Air Power Park in Hampton, Virginia

When NASA needed a booster for Project Mercury, the agency found that the Atlas rockets would cost approximately US$2.5 million each and that even the Redstone would cost about $1 million per launch. The managers of the Mercury program recognized that the numerous early test flights would have to be accomplished by a far less expensive booster system, so NASA designed the Little Joe rocket which cost $200,000 each.

In January 1958, Max Faget and Paul Purser had worked out in considerable detail on paper how to cluster four of the solid-fuel Sergeant rockets, in standard use at the Wallops Flight Facility in Virginia, to boost a crewed nose cone above the stratosphere. Faget's short-lived "High Ride" proposal had suffered from comparisons with "Project Adam" at that time, but in August 1958 William Bland and Ronald Kolenkiewicz had returned to their preliminary designs for a cheap cluster of solid rockets to boost full-scale and full-weight model capsules above the atmosphere. As drop tests of boilerplate capsules provided new aerodynamic data on the dynamic stability of the configuration in free-fall, the need for comparable data on the powered phase quickly became apparent. So in October 1958, a NASA team prepared new engineering layouts and estimates for the mechanical design of the booster structure and a suitable launcher.

As the blueprints for this cluster of four rockets began to emerge from their drawing boards, the designers' nickname for their project gradually was adopted. Since their first cross-section drawings showed four holes, they called the project "Little Joe", from the craps throw of a double deuce on the dice. Although four smaller circles were added later to represent the addition of Recruit rocket motors, the original name stuck. The appearance on engineering drawings of the four large stabilizing fins protruding from its airframe also helped to perpetuate the name Little Joe had acquired.

The primary purpose of this relatively small and simple booster system was to save money — by allowing numerous test flights to qualify various solutions to the myriad problems associated with the development of crewed space flight, especially the problem of escaping from an explosion at or during launch. Capsule aerodynamics under actual reentry conditions was another primary concern. To gain this kind of experience as soon as possible, its designers had to keep the clustered booster simple in concept; it should use solid fuel and existing proven equipment whenever possible, and should be free of any electronic guidance and control systems.

The designers made the Little Joe booster assembly to approximate the same performance that the Army's Redstone booster would have with the capsule payload. In addition to being flexible enough to perform a variety of missions, Little Joe could be made for about one-fifth the basic cost of the Redstone, would have much lower operating costs, and could be developed and delivered with much less time and effort. Unlike the larger launch vehicles, Little Joe could be launched from the existing facilities at Wallops Island.

== Launch vehicle development ==
Twelve companies responded during November 1958 to the invitations for bids to construct the airframe of Little Joe. The technical evaluation of these proposals was carried on in much the same manner as for the spacecraft, except that Langley Research Center itself carried the bulk of the administrative load. The Missile Division of North American Aviation won the contract on December 29, 1958; and began work immediately in Downey, California, on its order for seven booster airframes and one mobile launcher.

The primary mission objectives for Little Joe as seen in late 1958 (in addition to studying the capsule dynamics at progressively higher altitudes) were to test the capsule escape system at maximum dynamic pressure, to qualify the parachute system, and to verify search and retrieval methods. But since each group of specialists at work on the project sought to acquire firm empirical data as soon as possible, more exact priorities had to be established. The first flights were to secure measurements of inflight and impact forces on the capsule; later flights were to measure critical parameters at the progressively higher altitudes of 20,000, 250,000, and 500,000 feet (6, 75, and 150 km). The minimum aims of each Little Joe shot could be supplemented from time to time with studies of noise levels, heat and pressure loads, heat shield separation, and the behavior of animal riders, so long as the measurements could be accomplished with minimum telemetry. Since all the capsules boosted by the Little Joe rockets were expected to be recovered, onboard recording techniques would also contribute to the simplicity of the system.

The first of only two booster systems designed specifically and solely for crewed capsule qualifications, Little Joe was also one of the pioneer operational launch vehicles using the rocket cluster principle. Since the four modified Sergeants (called either Castor or Pollux rockets, depending upon modification) and four supplemental Recruit rockets were arranged to fire in various sequences, the takeoff thrust varied greatly, but maximum design thrust was almost 230,000 pounds (1,020 kilonewtons). Theoretically enough to lift a spacecraft of about 4,000 pounds (1,800 kg) on a ballistic path over 100 miles (160 km) high, the push of these clustered main engines should simulate the takeoff profile in the environment that the crewed Atlas would experience. Furthermore, the additional powerful explosive pull of the tractor-rocket escape system could be demonstrated under the most severe takeoff conditions imaginable. The engineers who mothered Little Joe to maturity knew it was not much to look at, but they hoped that their ungainly rocket would prove the legitimacy of most of the ballistic capsule design concepts, thereby earning its own honor. A successor, Little Joe II, would later be used for flight testing of the Apollo crew escape system.

== Flights ==
As of 21 January 1960, the Little Joe series of five actual and attempted flights had expended four of the six test boosters North American had made for NASA and five prototype capsules made in the Langley shops. The primary test objectives for these solid-fuel-boosted models were an integral part of the development flight program conducted within NASA by the Space Task Group, with Langley and Wallops support. Now only two Little Joe boosters remained for the qualification flight tests. North American had manufactured seven Little Joe airframes, but one of these had been retained at the plant in Downey, California, for static loading tests. STG ordered the refurbishment of this seventh airframe so as to have three Little Joe boosters for the qualification flight program. The success of Little Joe 1B in January 1960 meant that the next flight, the sixth, to be known as Little Joe 5, would be the first to fly a real Mercury capsule from the McDonnell production line. In passing from development flight tests with boilerplate models to qualification flight tests with the "real McDonnell" capsule, the Space Task Group moved further away from research into the development and toward operations.

== Mission numbering ==
The official Mercury mission numbering designation was a two-letter designation that corresponded to the launch vehicle type, followed by a dash then a digit indicating the particular set of flight objectives, and an optional letter used to distinguish further flights to accomplish those objectives. So the official designation for the first Little Joe flight was "LJ-1." Flights did not occur in numeric sequence as the project schedule was adapted as it progressed. The actual flight order was:

| Mission (Note: Source: Alexander & al., 1966, pp. 638–641 when nothing else is mentioned.) | Photo | Launch | Duration | Purpose | Result | Remarks |
|---|---|---|---|---|---|---|
| Little Joe 1 | | August 21, 1959 | 20 s | Test of launch escape system during flight. | Failure | Due to an electrical malfunction, the escape tower ignited 1/2 hour before launch and took the spacecraft with it, leaving the rocket on the ground. |
| Little Joe 6 | | October 4, 1959 | 5 m 10 s | Test of spacecraft aerodynamics and integrity. | Partial success | No additional tests |
| Little Joe 1A | | November 4, 1959 | 8 m 11 s | Test of launch escape system during flight with boiler plate capsule. | Partial success | The rescue tower rocket ignited 10 seconds too late. Recovered by USS Opportune 11.5 mi (18.5 km) SE of Wallops Island. |
| Little Joe 2 | | December 4, 1959 | 11 m 6 s | Escape system test with primate at high altitude. | Success | Carried Sam, a rhesus macaque. Recovered by USS Borie 194 mi (312 km) SE of Wallops Island, Virginia; altitude: 53 mi (85 km). |
| Little Joe 1B | | January 21, 1960 | 8 m 35 s | Maximum-q abort and escape test with primate with boiler plate capsule. | Success | Carried a female rhesus monkey named Miss Sam. |
| Little Joe 5 | | November 8, 1960 | 2 m 22 s | First Little Joe escape system test with a production spacecraft, at max-q. | Failure | The clamp holding the spacecraft was deflected by air pressure; due to this and incorrect wiring, the escape tower ignited too early and further failed to separate spacecraft from launch vehicle. (Note: The clamp was subsequently tested by a rocket sled.) Altitude: 10 mi (16 km) |
| Little Joe 5A | | March 18, 1961 | 5 m 25 s | Second test of escape system with a production Mercury spacecraft. | Partial success | Tower fired 14 seconds too soon; it failed to separate the spacecraft from the rocket. |
| Little Joe 5B | | April 28, 1961 | 5 m 25 s | Third test of escape system with a production spacecraft. | Success | Concluded Little Joe program. |

== Specifications ==
- Little Joe I
  - Thrust: 235,000 lbf (1,044 kN)
  - Length: 15.2 m
  - Diameter: 2.03 m
  - Fin Span: 6.5 m
  - Weight: 28,000 lb (12,700 kg)
  - Fuel: Solid
  - Burn Time: ~40 s
- Recruit rocket (Thiokol XM19)
  - Thrust: 37,500 lbf (167 kN)
  - Length: 2.7 m
  - Diameter: 0.23 m
  - Weight: 350 lb (159 kg)
  - Fuel: Solid
  - Burn Time: 1.53 s
- Castor rocket (Thiokol XM33)
  - Thrust: 58,200 lbf (259 kN)
  - Length: 6.04 m
  - Diameter: 0.79 m
  - Weight: 9,753 lb (4,424 kg)
  - Fuel: Solid
  - Burn Time: 37 s

== See also ==
- Big Joe 1
- Little Joe II
- Boilerplate (spaceflight)

== Sources ==
- Alexander, C. C.; Grimwood, J. M.; Swenson, L. S. (1966). This New Ocean: a History of Project Mercury (PDF). US: NASA. ISBN 1934941875.
- Catchpole, John (2001). Project Mercury: NASA's First Manned Space Programme. London: Springer. ISBN 978-1-85233-406-2.
