= Little Joe 1 =

1959 failed rocket launch

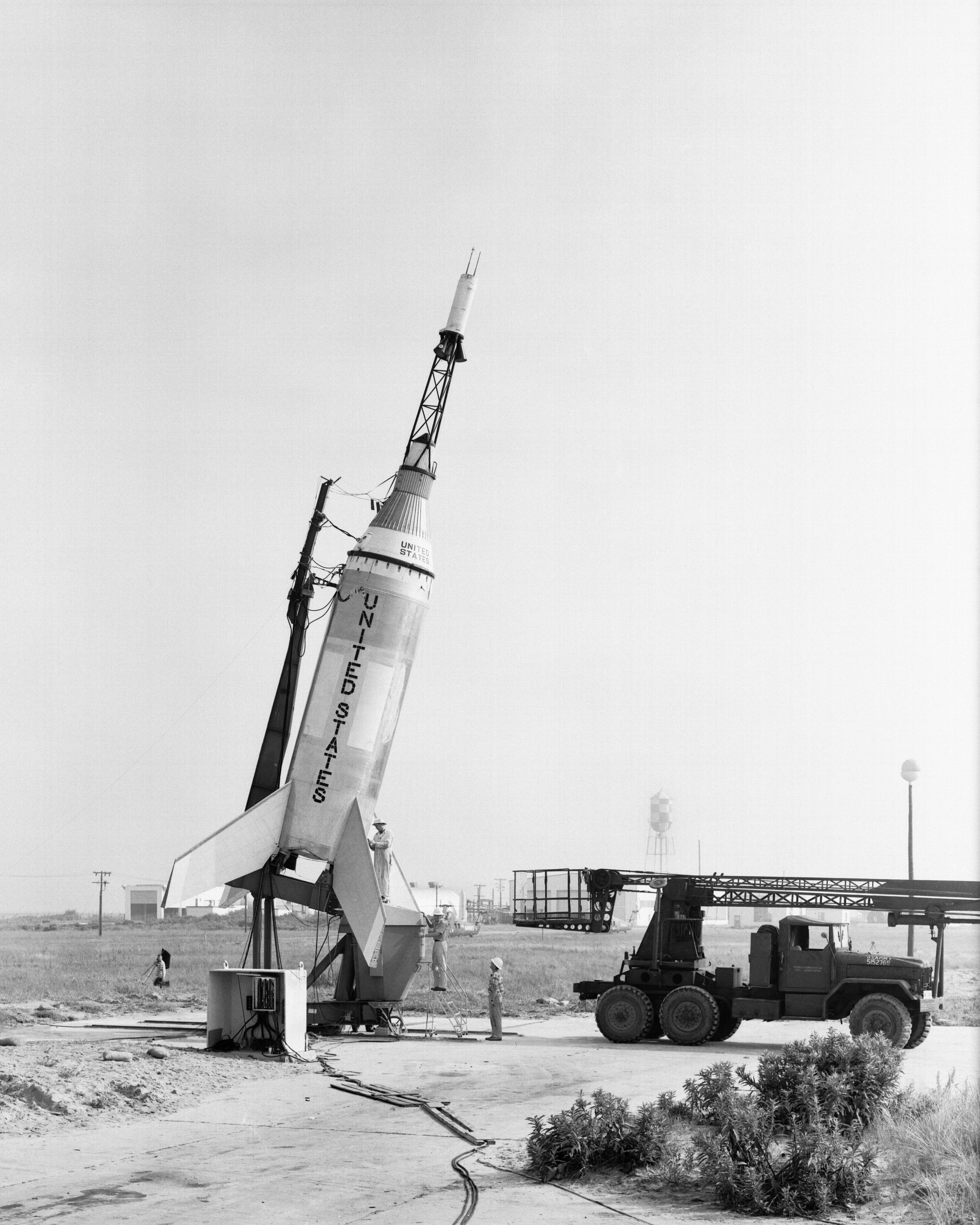
- Little Joe 1 prepares for launch.
- Mission type: Max Q abort and escape test
- Operator: (United States) NASA
- Mission duration: 20 seconds
- Distance travelled: 2,000 feet (610 m)
- Apogee: 2,000 feet (610 m)

Spacecraft properties
- Spacecraft type: Mercury boilerplate
- Manufacturer: McDonnell Aircraft
- Launch mass: 1,159 kilograms (2,555 lb)

Start of mission
- Launch date: 21 August 1959; Launch Escape System fired 30 minutes before planned launch
- Rocket: Little Joe
- Launch site: Wallops LA-1

End of mission
- Landing date: 21 August 1959
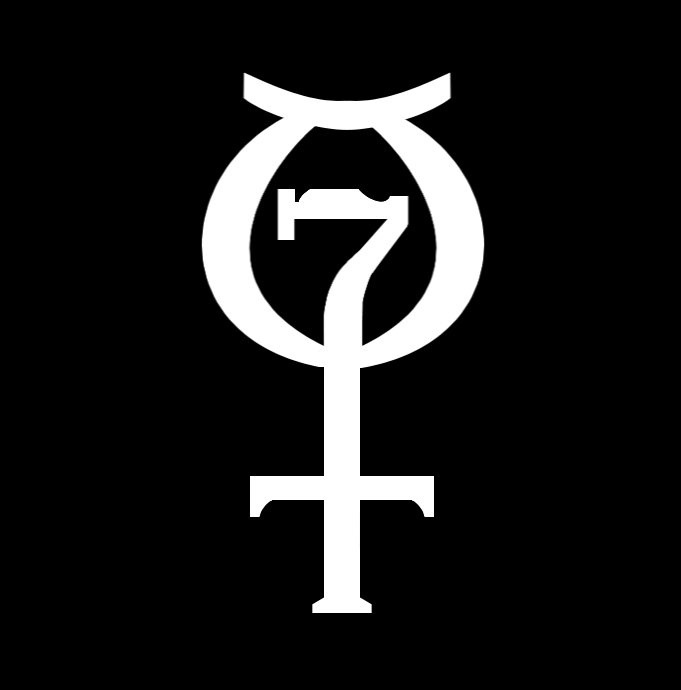
- Project Mercury; Abort Tests

Little Joe 1 (LJ-1) was a failed launch of a Little Joe by NASA, a solid fuel rocket that was designed for a Max Q abort and launch escape system test for the Mercury capsule. The objective was to determine how well the escape rocket would function under the most severe dynamic loading conditions anticipated during a Mercury-Atlas launching.

The vehicle was 15 m (49 ft) in height, weighed approximately 20,000 kg (44,000 lb), and was 2 m (79 in) in diameter with a fin span of 6.5 m (21 ft). The Little Joe booster consisted of four Pollux and four Recruit clustered, solid-fuel rockets, could develop a thrust of 250,000 lbf (1,100 kN), and could lift a maximum payload of 3,942 lb (1,788 kg). The escape system, using a Grand Central 1KS52000 rocket motor, weighed 460 kg (1,010 lb).

On 21 August 1959, LJ-1 was being prepared for launch from the Wallops Flight Facility, Wallops Island, Virginia. At 35 minutes before launch, evacuation of the area had been proceeding on schedule and the batteries for the programmer and destruct system in the test booster were being charged. Suddenly, half an hour before launch time, an explosive flash occurred. When the smoke cleared it was evident that only the capsule-and-tower combination had been launched, on a trajectory similar to an off-the-pad abort. The booster and adapter-clamp ring remained intact on the launcher. Near apogee, at about 610 m, the clamping ring that held tower to capsule released and the little pyro-rocket for jettisoning the tower fired. The flight time was 20 seconds.

The accident report for LJ-1, issued 18 September 1959, blamed the premature firing of the Grand Central escape rocket on an electrical leak, or what missile engineers call transients or ghost voltages in a relay circuit. The fault was found in a coil designed to protect biological specimens from too rapid an abort.

According to the 18 September 1959 accident report, the unexpected triggering of the launch escape system was caused by a transient or electrical leak; analysis showed it to be due to the rapid-abort system being wired directly into the destruct arming busbar. The batteries were shipped from England to the U.S. uncharged and shorted; on charging at the pad, the batteries, when enough charge was reached, actuated the sequencer for the abort system, and sensing insufficient altitude, fired the squibs in the abort motor. Insufficient power in the batteries then failed to initiate the tower jettison motor and capsule parachute recovery charge, and both crashed into the sea.
