= Virginia Science Festival =

- Abbreviation: VSF
- Formation: October 4, 2014; 11 years ago
- Purpose: STEM outreach and education
- Headquarters: Blacksburg, Virginia
- Region served: Virginia
- Parent organization: Virginia Tech, Science Museum of Western North Carolina
- Affiliations: USA Science and Engineering Festival
- Website: virginiasciencefestival.org

The Virginia Science Festival (VSF) is a multi-week event encompassing events across 11 sites featuring many disciplines throughout Virginia. The festival was inaugurated in 2014, and is organized by Virginia Tech and the Science Museum of Western Virginia with the goal of highlighting the educational, cultural, and economic impact of science in the state. NCSF events include hands-on activities, talks, and lab tours.

Participants have included NASA Langley, Wallops Flight Center, Virginia Department of Transportation, American Red Cross, WDBJ, and Carilion Health Care.

The festival was initially funded through a grant from the Science Festival Foundation, the Alfred P. Sloan Foundation, and Appalachian Power.
