= Little Joe 5B =

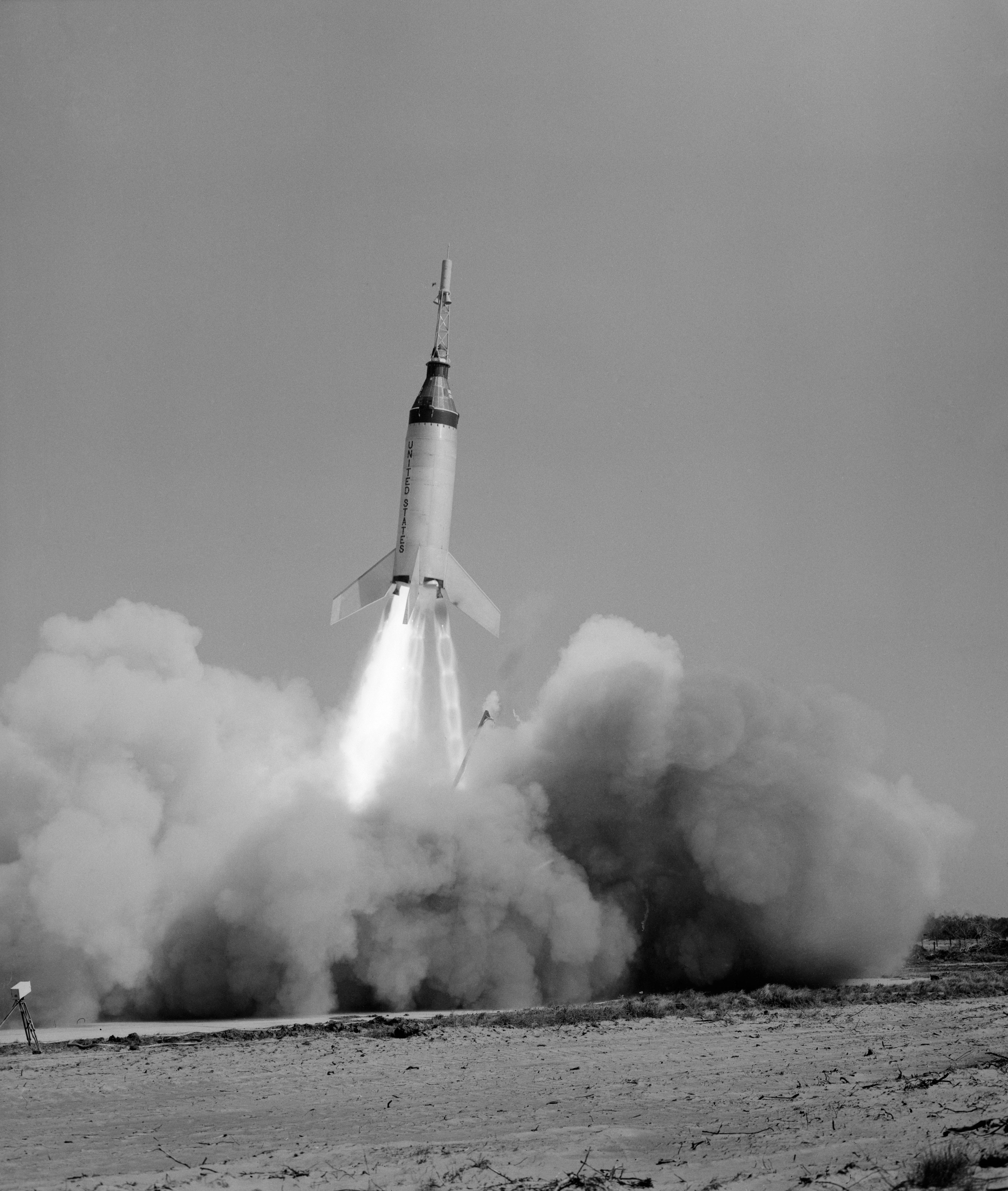
- Launch of Little Joe 5B from Wallops Island
- Mission type: Abort test
- Operator: NASA
- Mission duration: 5 minutes, 25 seconds
- Distance travelled: 14 kilometres (9 mi)
- Apogee: 4.5 kilometres (2.8 mi)

Spacecraft properties
- Spacecraft: Mercury No.14
- Manufacturer: McDonnell Aircraft
- Launch mass: 1,141 kilograms (2,515 lb)

Start of mission
- Launch date: April 28, 1961, 14:03 UTC
- Rocket: Little Joe
- Launch site: Wallops LA-4

End of mission
- Landing date: April 28, 1961, 14:08 UTC
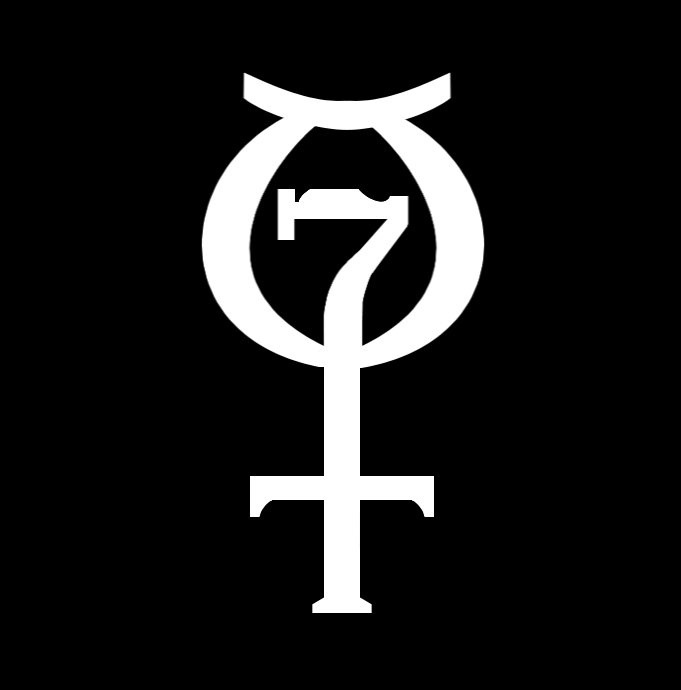
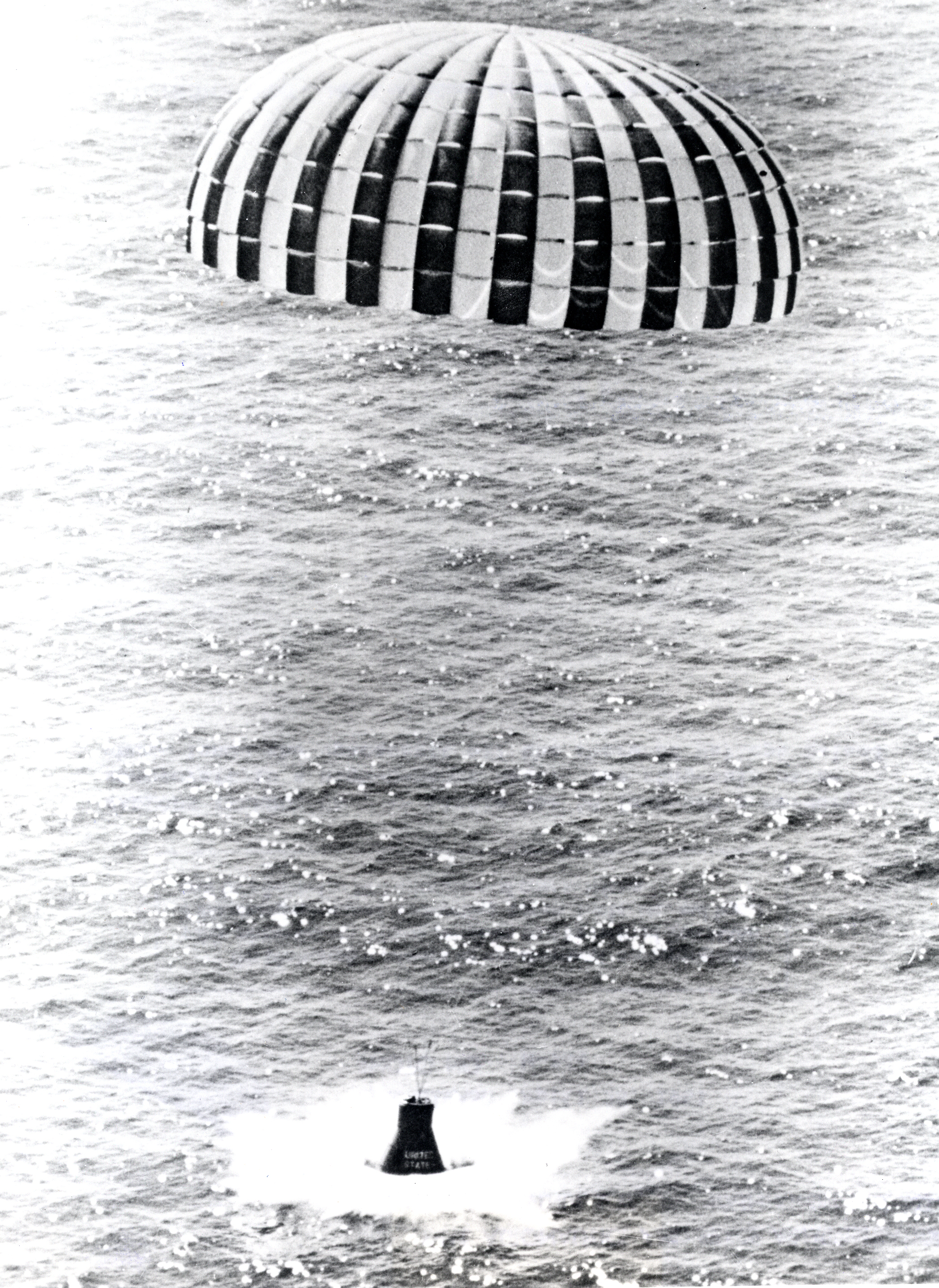
- Project Mercury; Abort Tests Little Joe 5B High-Q-Abort Test

Little Joe 5B was an uncrewed launch escape system test of the Mercury spacecraft using a production capsule, conducted as part of the US Mercury program. The mission was launched April 28, 1961, from Wallops Island, Virginia and flew to an apogee of 2.8 miles (4.5 km) and a range of 9 miles (14 km), lasting 5 minutes 25 seconds. Maximum speed was 1,780 mph (2865 km/h) and acceleration was 10 g (98 m/s²). The mission was a success and the spacecraft was recovered.

Mercury spacecraft #14A, which was also launched in the Little Joe 5A test, was reused in this mission; it is on display at the Virginia Air and Space Center in Hampton, Virginia.

== See also ==
- Little Joe (rocket)
