= Air Power Park =

Museum in Virginia, United States

Coordinates: 37.043412°N 76.366181°W

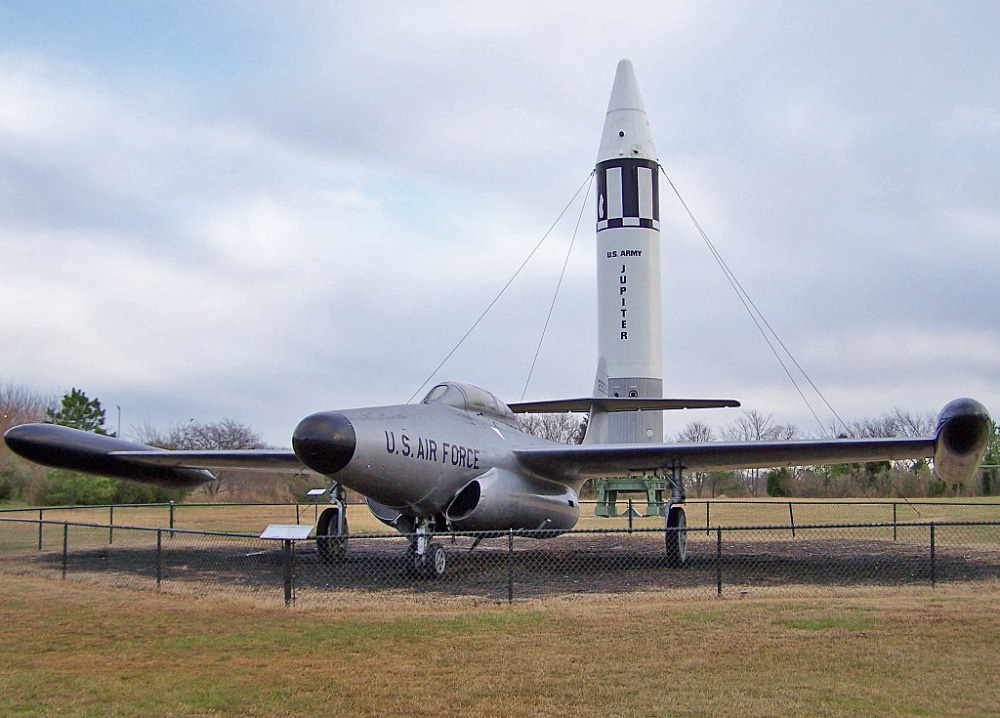
F-89J s/n 52-2129 on display at the Air Power Park

The Air Power Park is an outdoor, roadside museum in Hampton, Virginia which recognizes Hampton's role in America's early space exploration and aircraft testing. The outdoor park is open year-round, seven days a week, from sunrise to sunset. Several vintage aircraft and experimental space launch vehicles from the 1950s and 1960s are displayed outdoors. The park is on a 15 acres (6.1 ha) plot and includes a children's playground.

The indoor museum at the park's center was reopened after a 2011 renovation (with hours more limited than the outdoor part of the park). There are eight themed rooms containing over 325 models of aircraft, spacecraft, and nautical vessels representing all the U.S. branches of service as well as various model craft from other nations. The park also has a time capsule

== Indoor museum ==
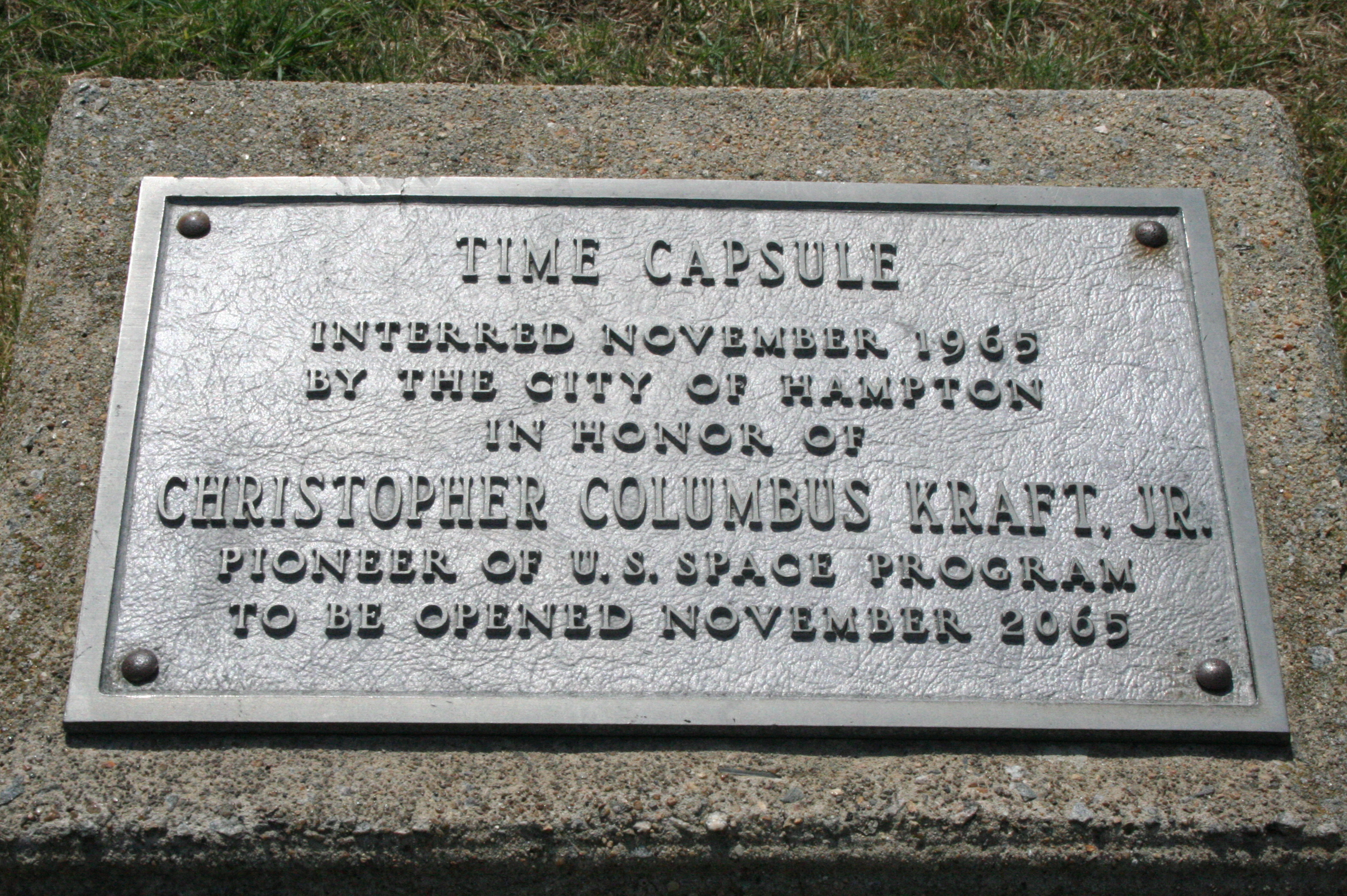
Time capsule buried in park near Jupiter C rocket and F-89J

- NASA Room
- United States Air Force Aviation Room- Including items highlighting nearby Langley Air Force Base's contribution to the USAF.
- General Aviation Room
- Library
- Cold War Era Room
- International Plastic Modellers' Society Room- containing periodically rotating display of local IPMS member's models.
- United States Navy Room
- United States Army Aviation Branch Room

== On display ==
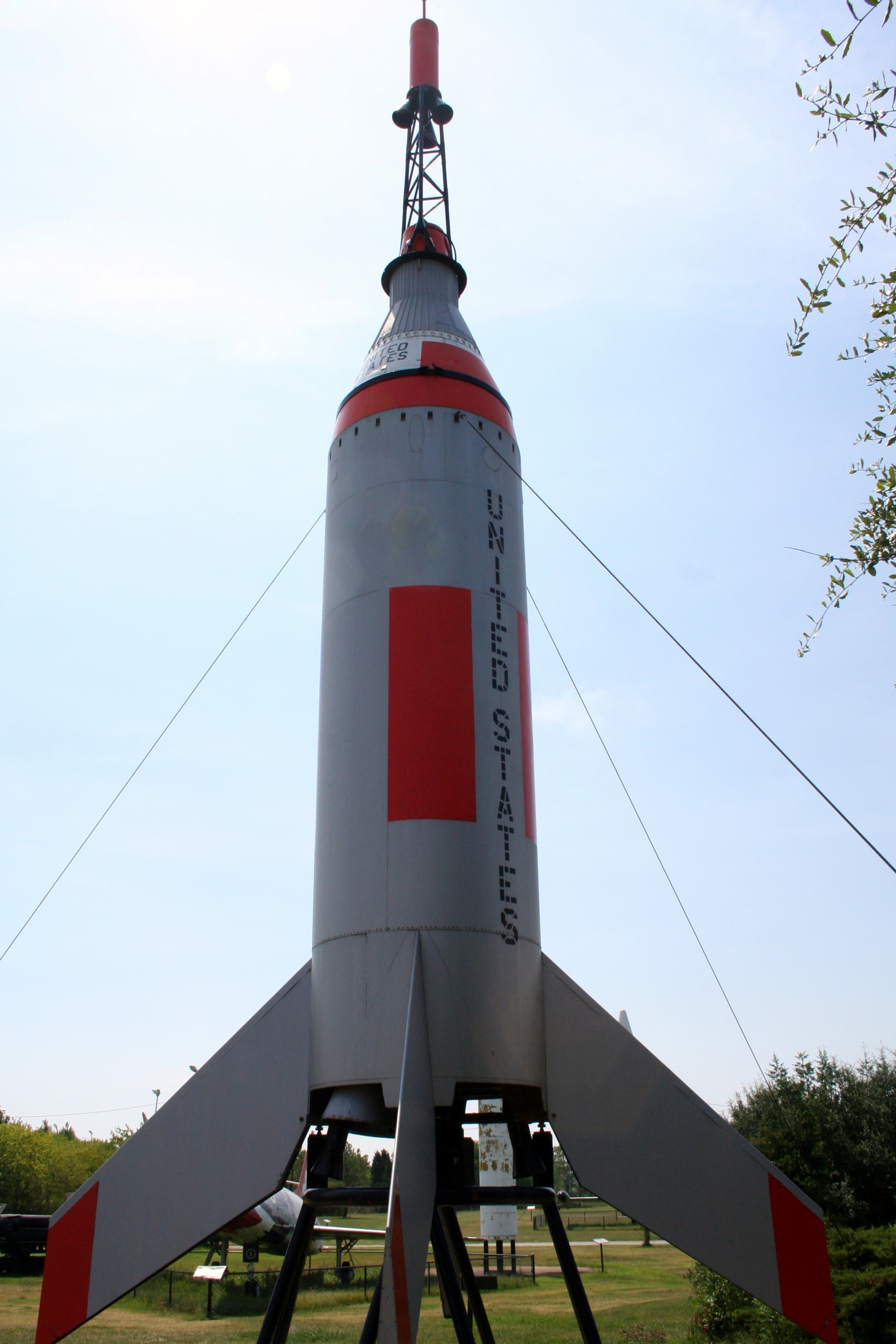
Mercury Little Joe (rocket) booster rocket on display at Air Power Park

The following are listed as on display:

- P.1127 Kestrel
- F-86L Sabre
- Mercury capsule
- A-7E Corsair II
- F-101F Voodoo
- F-89J Scorpion
- RF-4C Phantom II
- F-105D Thunderchief
- T-33A Trainer
- Jupiter IRBM
- Nike SAM
- Nike Ajax SAM
- Nike Hercules SAM
- F-100D Super Sabre
- Polaris A-2 SLBM
- Corporal IRBM
- Little Joe/Mercury, booster used in testing for the Mercury program. Launched from Wallops Flight Facility, 90 miles north.

== See also ==
- List of aerospace museums
- Rocket garden
