= Little Joe 5 =

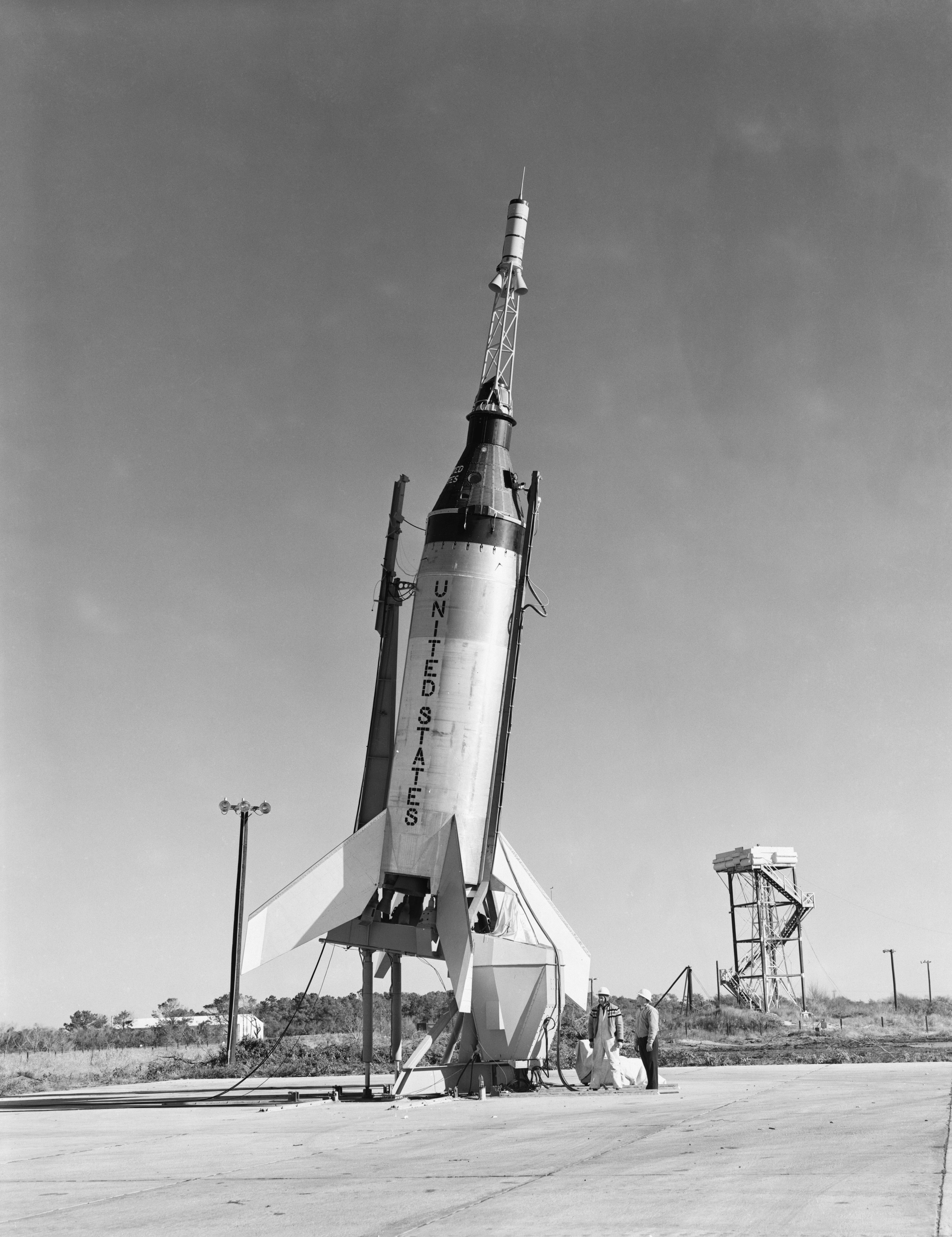
- Little Joe 5 prepared for launch, Wallops Island
- Mission type: Abort test
- Operator: NASA
- Mission duration: 2 minutes, 22 seconds
- Distance travelled: 23 kilometres (14 mi)
- Apogee: 16.3 kilometres (10.1 mi)

Spacecraft properties
- Spacecraft: Mercury No.3
- Manufacturer: McDonnell Aircraft
- Launch mass: 1,141 kilograms (2,515 lb)

Start of mission
- Launch date: November 8, 1960, 15:18 UTC
- Rocket: Little Joe
- Launch site: Wallops LA-1

End of mission
- Landing date: November 8, 1960, 15:20 UTC
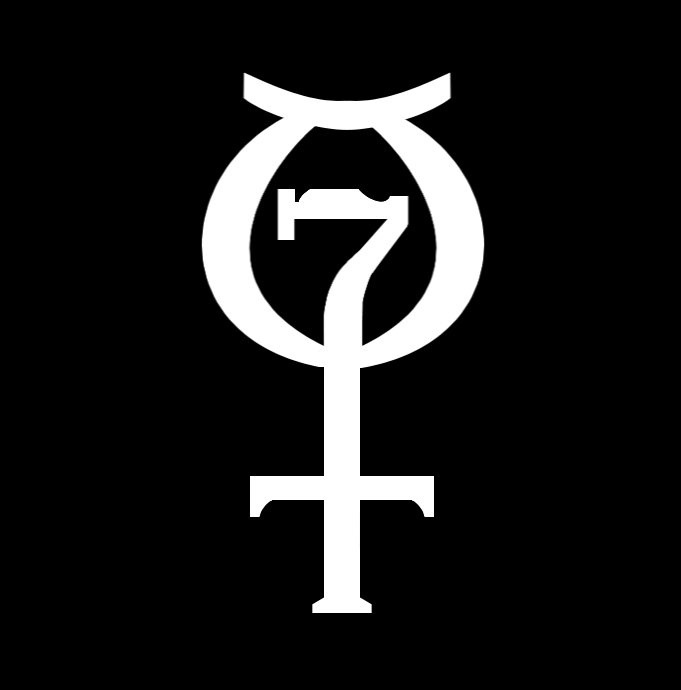
- Project Mercury; Abort Tests

Little Joe 5 was the November 8, 1960, unmanned atmospheric test flight of the Mercury spacecraft, conducted as part of the U.S. Mercury program. The objective was to test a production Mercury capsule (#3) and the launch escape system during an ascent abort at maximum dynamic pressure. The mission was launched from Wallops Island, Virginia. Sixteen seconds after liftoff, the escape rocket and the tower jettison rocket both fired prematurely. Furthermore, the booster, capsule, and escape tower failed to separate as intended. The entire stack was destroyed on impact with the Atlantic Ocean. The Little Joe 5 flew to an apogee of 10.1 miles (16.2 km) and a range of 13 miles (20.9 km). Some capsule and booster debris was recovered from the ocean floor for post flight analysis.

== See also ==
- Little Joe
