= Science Museum of Western Virginia =

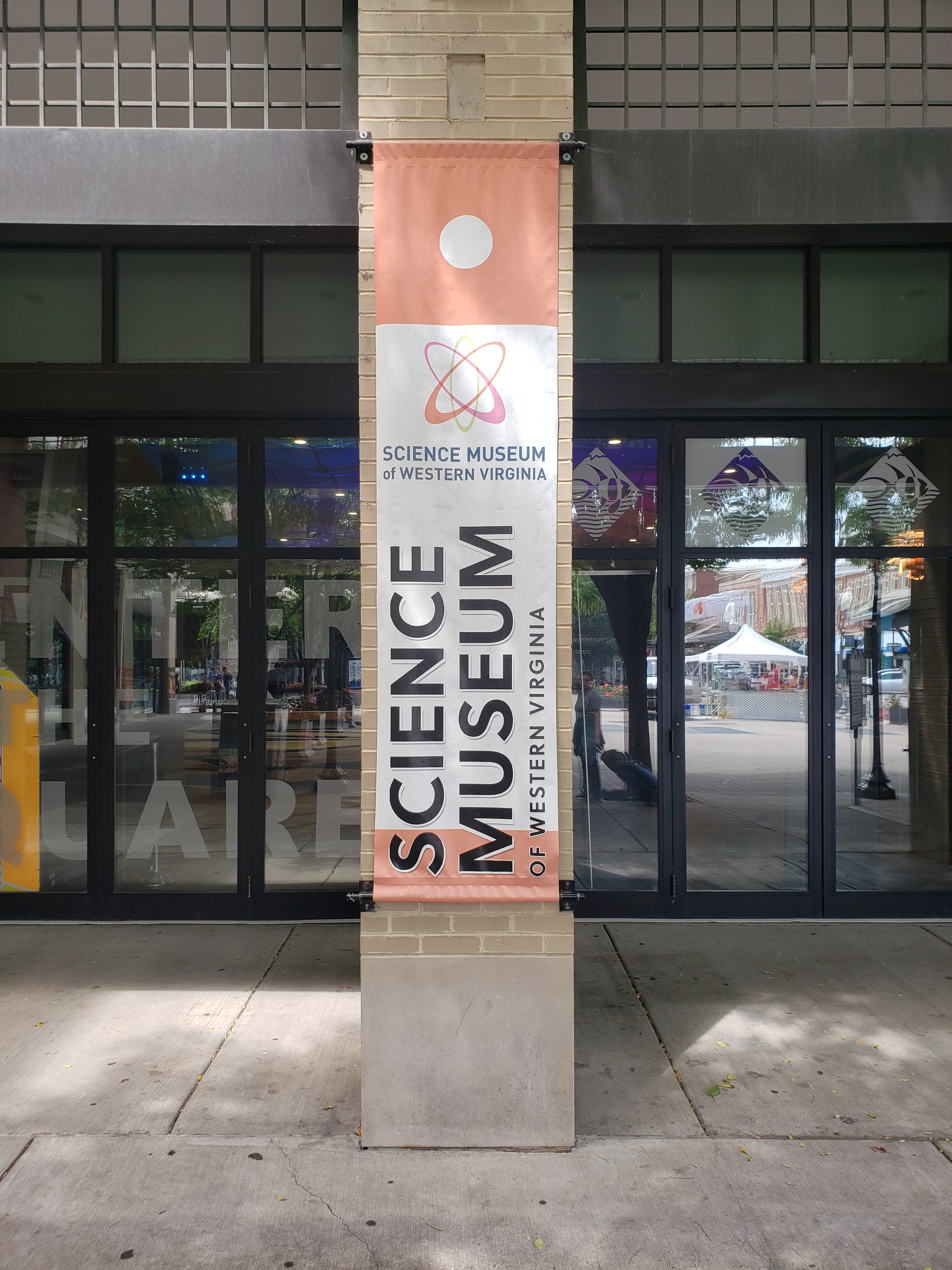

- Location within Virginia Location within the United States
- Established: 1970
- Location: One Market Square SE, 4th Floor; Roanoke, Virginia
- Coordinates: 37.2720°N 79.939°W
- Type: Science museum
- Website: smwv.org

The Science Museum of Western Virginia is a science museum located in Roanoke, Virginia. Exhibit themes include the environment and its health, healthy bodies, computer coding, the scientific method of engineering, and science through toys and amusements. The museum also features a maker space and a garden with a variety of plants with a focus on agriculture.

In partnership with Virginia Tech, the Science Museum of Western Virginia sponsors the annual Virginia Science Festival.

== History ==
The museum was chartered in January 1970 as the first science museum in the Commonwealth of Virginia. Originally housed in the 400 square foot basement of Cherry Hill, a multi-cultural center in South Roanoke, it moved in 1976 to the abandoned Tinker Creek School, a 3,000 square-foot building built during World War I. In 1983 the museum moved into the Center in the Square, a renovated large five-story warehouse in the city's downtown market district that opened as a multi-cultural center with other museums and non-profit organizations.
