= USS Borie (DD-704) =

Allen M. Sumner-class destroyer

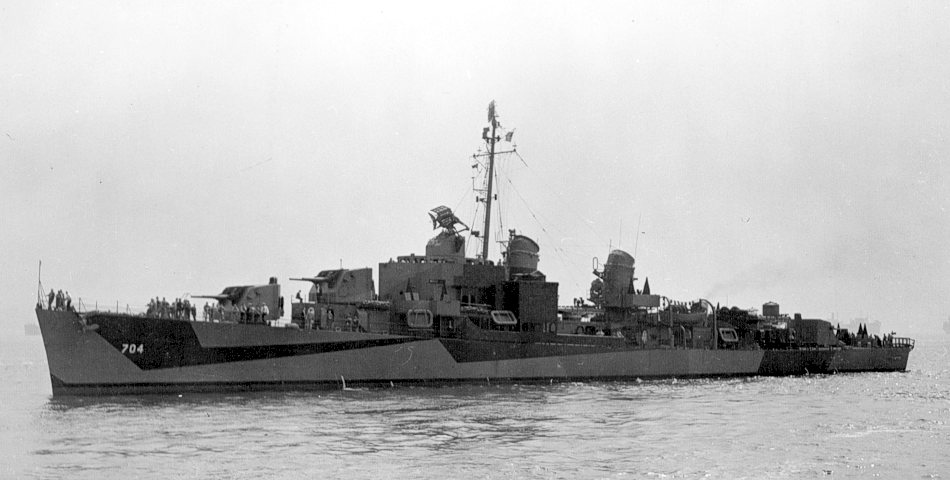
- USS Borie wearing camouflage paint, date and location unknown.

History

United States
- Name: Borie
- Namesake: Adolph E. Borie
- Builder: Federal Shipbuilding and Dry Dock Company
- Laid down: 29 February 1944
- Launched: 4 July 1944
- Commissioned: 21 September 1944
- Decommissioned: 1 July 1972
- Stricken: 1 July 1972
- Fate: To Argentina 1 July 1972

Argentina
- Name: Hipólito Bouchard
- Namesake: Hippolyte de Bouchard
- Acquired: 1 July 1972
- Decommissioned: 1984
- Stricken: 1984
- Identification: D-26
- Fate: Broken up for scrap 1984

General characteristics
- Class & type: Allen M. Sumner-class destroyer
- Displacement: 2,200 tons
- Length: 376 ft 6 in (114.76 m)
- Beam: 40 ft (12 m)
- Draft: 15 ft 8 in (4.78 m)
- Propulsion: 60,000 shp (45,000 kW); 2 propellers
- Speed: 34 kn (63 km/h; 39 mph)
- Range: 6,500 nmi (12,000 km; 7,500 mi) at 15 kn (28 km/h; 17 mph)
- Complement: 336
- Armament: 6 × 5 in (130 mm)/38 guns; 12 × 40 mm AA guns, 11 × 20 mm AA guns, 10 × 21 inch (533 mm) torpedo tubes, 6 × depth charge projectors, 2 × depth charge tracks

USS Borie (DD-704), an Allen M. Sumner-class destroyer, was the second ship of the United States Navy to be named for Adolph E. Borie, Secretary of the Navy under President Ulysses S. Grant.

== Construction ==
Borie (DD-704) was launched on 4 July 1944 by Federal Shipbuilding and Dry Dock Co., Kearny, New Jersey sponsored by Mrs Albert Nalle (née Patty Neill Borie, great-grandniece of Adolph E. Borie); and commissioned on 21 September 1944.

== Service history ==
=== World War II ===
Borie joined the Pacific Fleet, arriving at Pearl Harbor 4 January 1945. She took part in the Battle of Iwo Jima, both the bombardment (24 January) and invasion (19–23 February). After joining Task Force 58, she participated in the Tokyo raids (16–17 and 25 February), Okinawa raid (1 March), and the raids in support of the occupation of Okinawa (17 March–14 May). From 9 July to 9 August, she served with Task Force 38 in its raids on the Japanese home islands. On 9 August, four kamikazes attempted to crash into Borie, one achieving a hit on superstructure between the mast and the 5-inch gun director, causing extensive damage, killing 48 men, and wounding 66. The 3 other were shot down or missed. Due to the hit the Borie's rudder was locked.

=== Korean War ===
The damaged destroyer returned to Saipan and Pearl Harbor for temporary repairs and on 10 September entered dry dock at Hunter's Point, California, for permanent repairs. Repairs completed on 20 November, she departed San Diego 4 February 1946 to join the Atlantic Fleet. Borie remained in the Atlantic Fleet, except for one cruise to Korea (6 September 1950 – 9 June 1951), during which she served with TF 77 and took part in the Hungnam Evacuation. Borie made at least five European and Mediterranean cruises. During a deployment (28 July-4 December 1956), she assisted in the evacuation of American nationals and United Nations truce teams from Haifa, Israel and Gaza, Egypt. She returned to more routine operations, with a few notable exceptions, her 1959 recovery of the Project Mercury nose cone and Sam, the space monkey and her 1960 surveillance duties with the Polaris missile submarines George Washington Carver and Robert E. Lee.

In 1961 she completed her Fleet Rehabilitation and Modernization (FRAM) overhaul. In the Caribbean in 1962, she rescued nine Cubans seeking asylum in the U.S. and, later, three Jamaican fishermen, and then joined the U.S. blockade during the Cuban Missile Crisis where Borie participated in forcing a diesel-powered Russian submarine to the surface, then offered the submarine aid and supplies. Borie, with two other destroyers, escorted the submarine out of the area. During the night, Borie received orders to head for the Panama Canal and wait for 20 amphibious ships from the west coast to establish an attack task force. Over the ensuing years, she acquired a Drone Antisubmarine Helicopter (DASH) system and during a Mediterranean deployment, rescued an F-8 Crusader pilot whose plane crashed in a landing attempt on the aircraft carrier Shangri-La.

=== Vietnam War and decommissioning ===
In February 1968, Borie began her Vietnam deployment, serving in the Gulf of Tonkin as plane guard and completing radar picket duty. On the gun line, her gunners fired over 7,000 rounds at enemy positions at Phan Thiet and in the Mekong Delta. Returning to peacetime operations in 1969, Borie became a naval reserve training ship until June 1972, when she was decommissioned. She was struck from the Naval Vessel Register on 1 July 1972.

=== Service in the Argentine Navy ===
She was sold to the Argentine Navy and renamed Hipólito Bouchard (D-26) after the Argentine privateer, Hippolyte Bouchard and had four Exocet anti-ship missiles fitted in 1977–78. ARA Bouchard saw action in the Falklands War, forming a part of the escort for the aircraft carrier Veinticinco de Mayo during the initial Argentine invasion on 2 April 1982. On 26 April Bouchard and sister ship Piedra Buena formed the escort for the cruiser ARA General Belgrano when Belgrano set out from Ushuaia in response to the approaching British Task Force, and was present when, on 2 May 1982, Belgrano was torpedoed and sunk. In author Michael Rossiter's Sink the Belgrano, (Random House, London, 2009), it is stated that Belgrano was unable to send any Mayday signal because of electrical failure; this and poor visibility meant the two escorting destroyers (both also ex-United States Navy vessels) were unaware of the sinking until some hours later. A total of 323 men were killed. During the torpedo attack, the crew of Bouchard felt an impact which was believed to have been one of the three torpedoes fired from HMS Conqueror. They later found four cracks in the hull which were thought to have been a torpedoe striking at the end of its run.

On the night of 17/18 May, a helicopter was tracked by the radar of Bouchard, which sent a message to her sister ship, ARA Piedrabuena, patrolling on the north, and then to the naval base of Río Grande. In fact, a SH-3 Sea King reconnaissance mission on Río Grande had been launched by the British from HMS Invincible as a prelude to Operation Mikado, but, after detecting the Argentine radar signal, the crew of the Sea King and members of the SAS flew to Chile, where they destroyed their aircraft. Argentine Navy reports claim that Bouchard shelled a submarine and a number of inflatable boats while on patrol two miles off Rio Grande on the evening of 16 May 1982, during an alleged British attempt to land special forces on Tierra del Fuego.

She was broken up for scrap in 1984.

== Awards ==
Borie received three battle stars for her World War II services and four battle stars for her participation in the Korean War.
