= Very Short Film Festival =

Australian short film festival

- Location: Australia
- Founded: 2021
- Hosted by: Film Fest Collective Pty Ltd
- Language: English
- Website: https://veryshortfilmfestival.com.au

The Very Short Film Festival (VSFF) is an annual Australian short-film festival established in 2021. The festival invites Australians of all ages to create films between two and five minutes in length, incorporating an annual signature theme. VSFF features a national filmmaking competition, an annual Premiere Weekend in Tasmania, a touring program across multiple Australian states, and year-round workshops and mentoring initiatives.

The festival was founded under the organisation Artology in 2021 and is now produced by Film Fest Collective.

== History ==
The Very Short Film Festival was launched in 2021 under the not-for-profit organisation Artology as a national initiative supporting accessible storytelling and emerging filmmakers. The inaugural festival introduced its defining creative rule: all entries must run between two and five minutes and include a signature theme.

In 2022 and 2023, the festival expanded its national reach, with broader media coverage, increased participation and strengthened partnerships with education and cultural organisations.

By 2024 and 2025, VSFF had established a strong presence in Tasmania, hosting Premiere Weekend events in Hobart and delivering regional engagement activities, screenings and workshops across the state. The festival also introduced a wider national tour, showcasing finalist films in metropolitan and regional venues.

== Festival format ==
The festival centres on a nationwide short-film competition open to Australian residents of all ages. Entry requirements specify that:

- Films must run between two and five minutes (no exceptions)
- All films must incorporate the annual signature theme
- Eligible formats include fiction, documentary, animation and hybrid works
- Participation in the competition is free of charge, and entry is open to Australian residents only.
- A Micro Film category for vertical films under 60 seconds was introduced in 2026.

VSFF activities include:

- An annual Premiere Weekend in Hobart, Tasmania
- A National Tour of finalist films
- Workshops, industry talks and alumni mentoring sessions
- Online public voting for the Audience Award

== Categories and awards ==
Regular festival awards include:

- Open Category
- Junior Category
- Audience Award
- Micro Film Award (introduced in 2026)

Finalists and award recipients receive national exposure through screenings, industry mentorship and media coverage from outlets including Guardian Australia, ABC and ScreenHub.

== Signature theme ==
A defining element of the festival is the signature theme, a creative prompt released each year. Filmmakers must integrate the theme visually, narratively or conceptually.

Past signature themes have included “Tasmania” (2021), “Spring” (2022), “Chip” (2023), “Spark” (2024), “Seed” (2025) and “Thread” (2026).

== Education and industry partnerships ==
VSFF collaborates with tertiary institutions and industry bodies to deliver training and mentoring for emerging filmmakers.

Key partners include:

- SAE University College, hosting “plan, shoot, edit” workshops in Melbourne, Sydney and Brisbane
- The Australian Film Television and Radio School (AFTRS), contributing mentors and educational support

These initiatives support filmmaking pathways across regional and metropolitan Australia.

== Touring and regional engagement ==
The festival’s National Tour brings finalist films to cinemas and community venues across Australia, accompanied by Q&As, workshops and outreach events. VSFF has a strong focus on regional engagement, with regular coverage from ABC Local Radio and regional news publications.

== Notable screened films ==
VSFF has premiered early work by emerging Australian filmmakers who have gone on to gain wider recognition. Notable screened films include:

- The Kelp Collector by Lacelid Productions, directed by Jack Breedon, showcased by Guardian Australia.
- ROE by Alison Stanton-Cook, featured in the Tasmanian Times.
- Sustenance, winner of the 2023 festival, showcased by Guardian Australia.

== Organisation ==
The festival was founded under Artology in 2021 and is now operated by Film Fest Collective. The current Festival Director is Tamara Svirskis, who oversees programming, partnerships, touring and educational initiatives.
