= Wallops Flight Facility =

American spaceport in Virginia

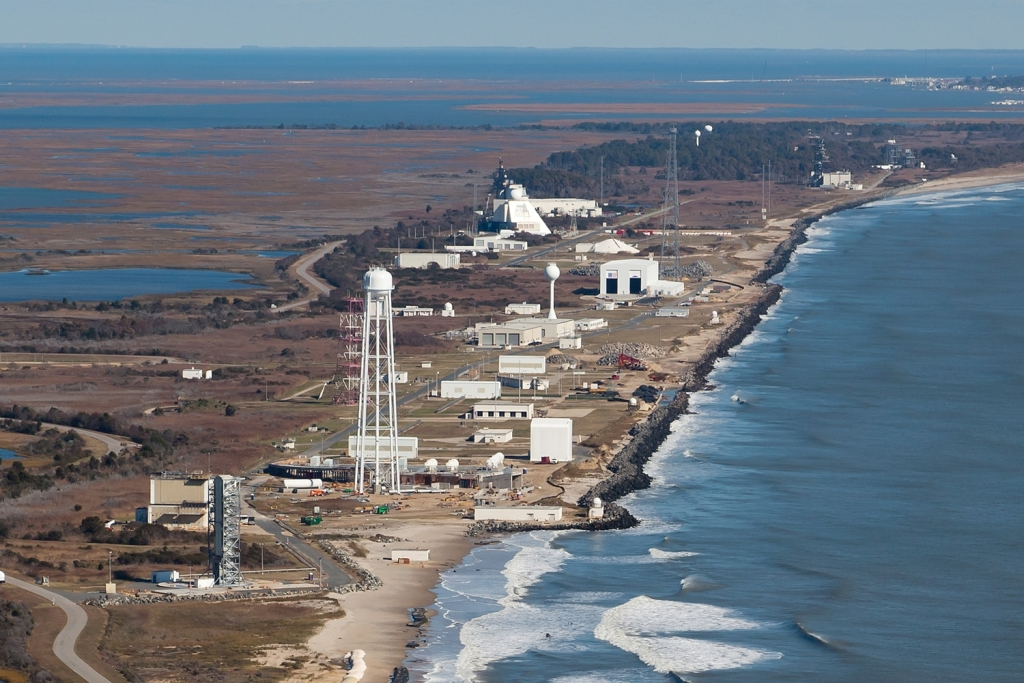
- Wallops Flight Facility, 2010

Agency overview
- Formed: 1945
- Preceding agencies: Pilotless Aircraft Research Station; Wallops Station
- Headquarters: Wallops Island, Virginia, 37.93333°N 75.46778°W
- Employees: 1,400
- Agency executive: David L. Pierce, director
- Parent agency: John F. Kennedy Space Center (NASA)
- Website: nasa.gov/wallops/

Map
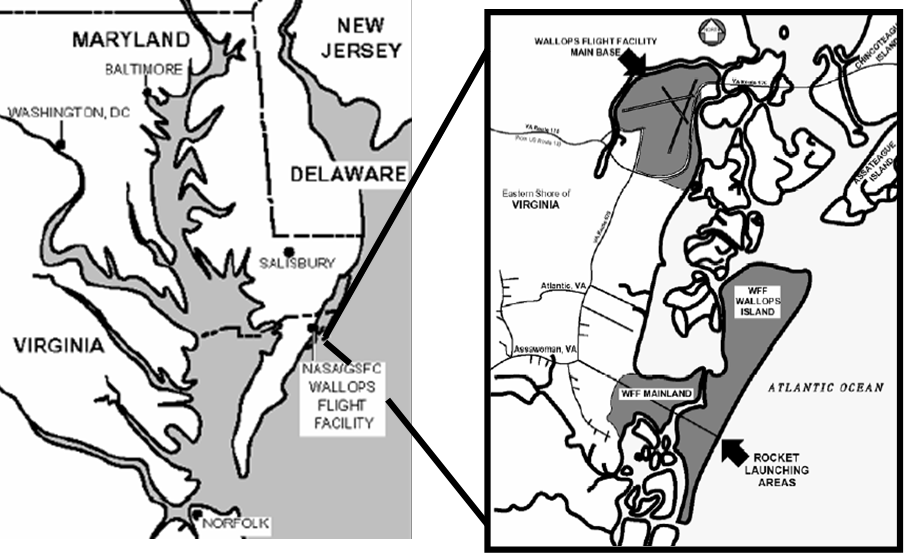
- Wallops Flight Facility with its three separate parcels of property

Wallops Flight Facility (WFF; IATA: WAL, ICAO: KWAL, FAA LID: WAL) is a rocket launch site on Wallops Island on the Eastern Shore of Virginia, United States, just east of the Delmarva Peninsula and approximately 100 miles (160 km) north-northeast of Norfolk. Since May 2026, the facility has been operated by the John F. Kennedy Space Center in Merritt Island, Florida, having previously been operated by the Goddard Space Flight Center in Greenbelt, Maryland. WFF primarily serves to support science and exploration missions for NASA and other federal agencies. WFF includes an extensively instrumented range to support launches of more than a dozen types of sounding rockets; small expendable suborbital and orbital rockets; high-altitude balloon flights carrying scientific instruments for atmospheric and astronomical research; and, using its Research Airport, flight tests of aeronautical research aircraft, including unmanned aerial vehicles.

There have been over 16,000 launches from the rocket testing range at Wallops since its founding in 1945 in the quest for information on the flight characteristics of airplanes, launch vehicles, and spacecraft, and to increase the knowledge of the Earth's upper atmosphere and the environment of outer space. The launch vehicles vary in size and power from the small Super Loki meteorological rockets to orbital-class vehicles.

The Wallops Flight Facility also supports science missions for the National Oceanic and Atmospheric Administration (NOAA) and occasionally for foreign governments and commercial organizations. Wallops also supports development tests and exercises involving United States Navy aircraft and ship-based electronics and weapon systems in the Virginia Capes operating area, near the entrance to the Chesapeake Bay. In addition to its fixed-location instrumentation assets, the WFF range includes mobile radar, telemetry receivers, and command transmitters that can be transported by cargo planes to locations around the world, in order to establish a temporary range where no other instrumentation exists, to ensure safety, and to collect data in order to enable and support suborbital rocket launches from remote sites.

The WFF mobile range assets have been used to support rocket launches from locations in the Arctic and Antarctic regions, South America, Africa, Europe, Australia, and at sea. Workers at Wallops include approximately 1,000 full-time NASA civil service employees and the employees of contractors, about 30 U.S. Navy personnel, and about 100 employees of NOAA.

== History ==
In 1945, NASA's predecessor agency, the National Advisory Committee for Aeronautics (NACA), established a rocket launch site on Wallops Island under the direction of the Langley Research Center. This site was designated the Pilotless Aircraft Research Station and conducted high-speed aerodynamic research to supplement wind tunnel and laboratory investigations into the problems of flight. In 1958, Congress established NASA, which absorbed Langley Research Center and other NACA field centers and research facilities. At that time, the Pilotless Aircraft Research Station became a separate facility, Wallops Station, operating directly under NASA Headquarters in Washington, D.C.

In 1959, NASA acquired the former Naval Air Station Chincoteague, and engineering and administrative activities were moved to this location. In 1974, the Wallops Station was named Wallops Flight Center. The name was changed to Wallops Flight Facility in 1981, when it became part of Goddard Space Flight Center.

In the early years, research at Wallops concentrated on obtaining aerodynamic data at transonic and low supersonic speeds. Between 1959 and 1961, Project Mercury capsules were tested at Wallops in support of NASA's crewed space flight program – the Mercury program – before astronauts were launched from Cape Canaveral Air Force Station in Florida. Some of these tests using the Little Joe booster rocket were designed to flight-qualify components of the spacecraft, including the escape and recovery systems and some of the life support systems. Two rhesus monkeys, Sam, launched in 1959, and Miss Sam, 1960, were sent aloft as pioneers for astronauts; both were recovered safely.

The first payload launched into orbit from Wallops Island was Explorer IX, atop a Scout rocket, on February 15, 1961.

On September 6, 2013, the Lunar Atmosphere and Dust Environment Explorer (LADEE) was launched from Wallops, atop a Minotaur V rocket. This was the first time that an American lunar mission had been launched from anywhere but Florida.

In May 2026, NASA Administrator Jared Isaacman announced that operational control of the Wallops Flight Facility would be moved from Goddard Space Flight Center to the John F. Kennedy Space Center.

Wallops Island is currently experiencing beach erosion of 10 to 22 feet (3 to 7 meters) a year, due in part to the current sea level rise; some access roads and parking lots have had to be rebuilt several times over the past five years. NASA has responded by continually fortifying the shoreline with sand.

A permanent ground control station for NASA's RQ-4 Global Hawk drone is at Wallops Flight Facility.

== Facilities ==
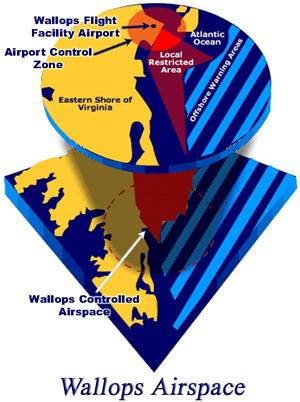

The WFF Main Base is located on the Eastern Shore of Virginia on the Delmarva Peninsula about 5 miles (8.0 km) west of Chincoteague, Virginia; about 90 miles (140 km) north of Norfolk, Virginia, and 40 miles (64 km) southeast of Salisbury, Maryland. The WFF consists of three separate parcels of land totaling 6,200 acres (25 km²): the Main Base, the Mainland, and the Wallops Island Launch Site. The Mainland and the Wallops Island Launch Site are about 7 miles (11 km) southeast of the Main Base.

=== Airspace ===
Wallops operates controlled airspace with Federal Aviation Administration (FAA) qualified air traffic controllers including:

- The WFF Airport Control Zone to 2,500 feet (760 m) within a 5-statute-mile (8.0 km) radius of the airport
- Restricted Area R-6604 connecting WFF airspace and offshore warning areas.

=== Fixed facilities ===
Major Wallops facilities include FAA-certified runways; an experimental UAV runway; and crash, fire, and rescue services. WFF has facilities for the receipt, inspection, assembly, checkout and storage of rocket motors and other hazardous pyrotechnic devices. The Wallops Island Launch Site includes six launch pads, three blockhouses for launch control, and assembly buildings to support the preparation and launching of suborbital and orbital launch vehicles.

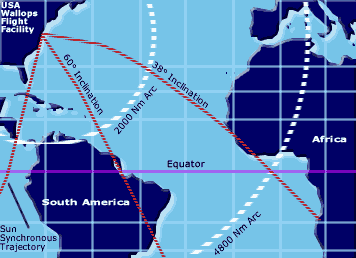
The NASA Wallops Flight Facility Range.

The Wallops Research Range includes ground-based and mobile systems, and a range control center. Its radar facilities and systems are used for tracking and surveillance. Telemetry facilities include a variety of antennas, receivers, and display instrumentation systems. Command uplink and optical tracking facilities are included as part of the range. The range also provides premier digital photographic and video services including operation of numerous still cameras, high speed and video systems for Range Safety support, surveillance, and post-launch analysis (e.g., failure analysis), project documentation (e.g., fabrication and test), administrative documentation, and archiving for environmental studies. In addition, WFF has a variety of communications systems and facilities to route voice, video, and data in support of launch processing, flight, and test operations.

The WFF Research Airport is located on the Main Base. There are three runways (from 4,810 feet (1,470 m) to 8,750 feet (2,670 m) long), two taxiways, three ramps, and one hazardous cargo loading area in active service. Two ramps adjoin the two active hangars, and a third ramp adjoins the Crash, Fire and Rescue building. The primary research runway has a test section with a variety of surface textures and materials for runway research projects.

Weather measurements and predictions are critical to all Research Airport operations, rocket and balloon launches, and in safely conducting hazardous operations on the ground. Wallops meteorological services provide measurements of upper atmospheric and magnetic phenomena to augment and enable the collection of scientific data by sensors aboard flight vehicles. The S-band Doppler radar system at Wallops, known as SPANDAR, is capable of automatic unambiguous tracking of targets up to 60,000 kilometers away. It can detect a single raindrop of 3 millimeters at a range of 10 kilometers and cloud water content as little as 1 gram per cubic meter. SPANDAR's sensitivity with its 60-foot (18 m) dish antenna can detect small changes in the refractive index of air caused by sea breeze fronts, gust fronts, and various forms of clear air turbulence.

=== Mobile systems ===
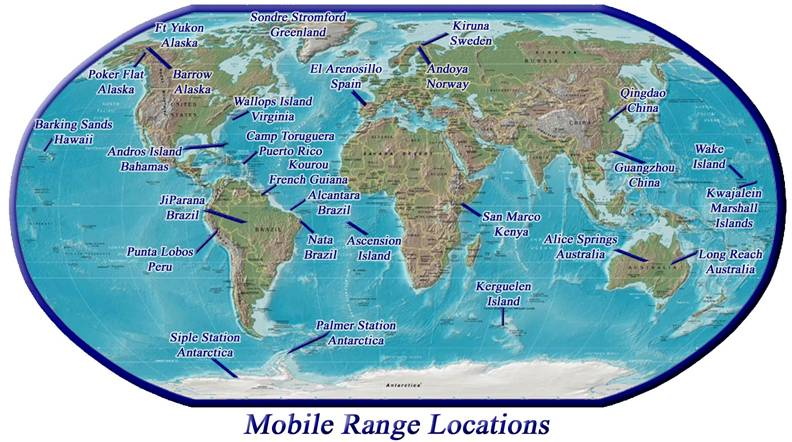
The NASA Wallops Mobile Range instrumentation has been deployed to support launch events in dozens of locations around the world.

The Wallops mobile range instrumentation includes telemetry, radar, command and power systems. These assets are used as needed to supplement instrumentation at existing ranges, or to establish a temporary range to ensure safety and collect data to support the rocket customers in a remote location where no other range instrumentation exists. This complement of transportable systems can be deployed to provide complete range capabilities at remote locations around the world. While Wallops Island is the prime location for range services, major sounding rocket campaigns have been supported at Poker Flat, Alaska; Andoya, Norway; and Kwajalein Island, Marshall Islands. The Wallops Mobile Instrumentation is integrated with NASA and Department of Defense networks and can be used to supplement established ranges in support of rocket launches.

== Range technology development ==
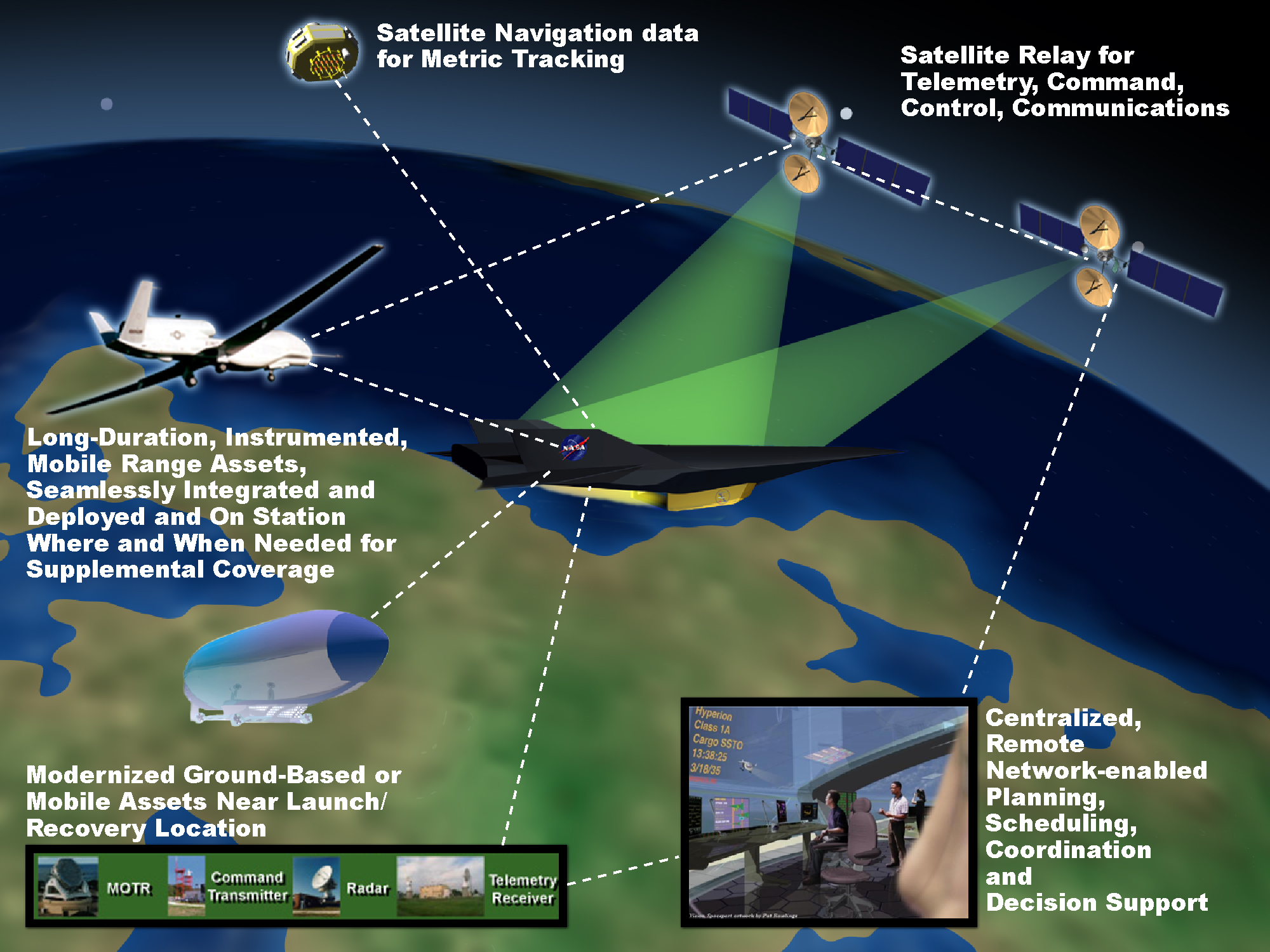
Envisioned Future Range Architecture

Since 2001, engineers at NASA Wallops Flight Facility have been developing new range technologies, systems and approaches to improve the cost and responsiveness of launch and flight test activities, within the constraints of available funding and program schedules.

Specifically, NASA Wallops has been leading two range technology development projects: the Autonomous Flight Safety System (AFSS) and the Low Cost TDRSS Transceiver (LCT2).

AFSS is a project to develop an autonomous on-board system that could augment or replace traditional ground-commanded Range Safety flight termination systems. The AFSS would use redundant sensors and processors on board a launch vehicle to monitor its trajectory, and if necessary initiate pyrotechnic devices to terminate the flight.

LCT2 is an effort to produce a relatively low-cost transceiver to allow launch vehicles to communicate through NASA's Tracking and Data Relay Satellite System (TDRSS) after they have gone over the horizon from the launch site. LCT2 is being pursued as part of the Space Based Range Demonstration and Certification (SBRDC) program (formerly called Space Based Telemetry and Range Safety (STARS)) in cooperation with NASA Kennedy Space Center.

== Missions ==
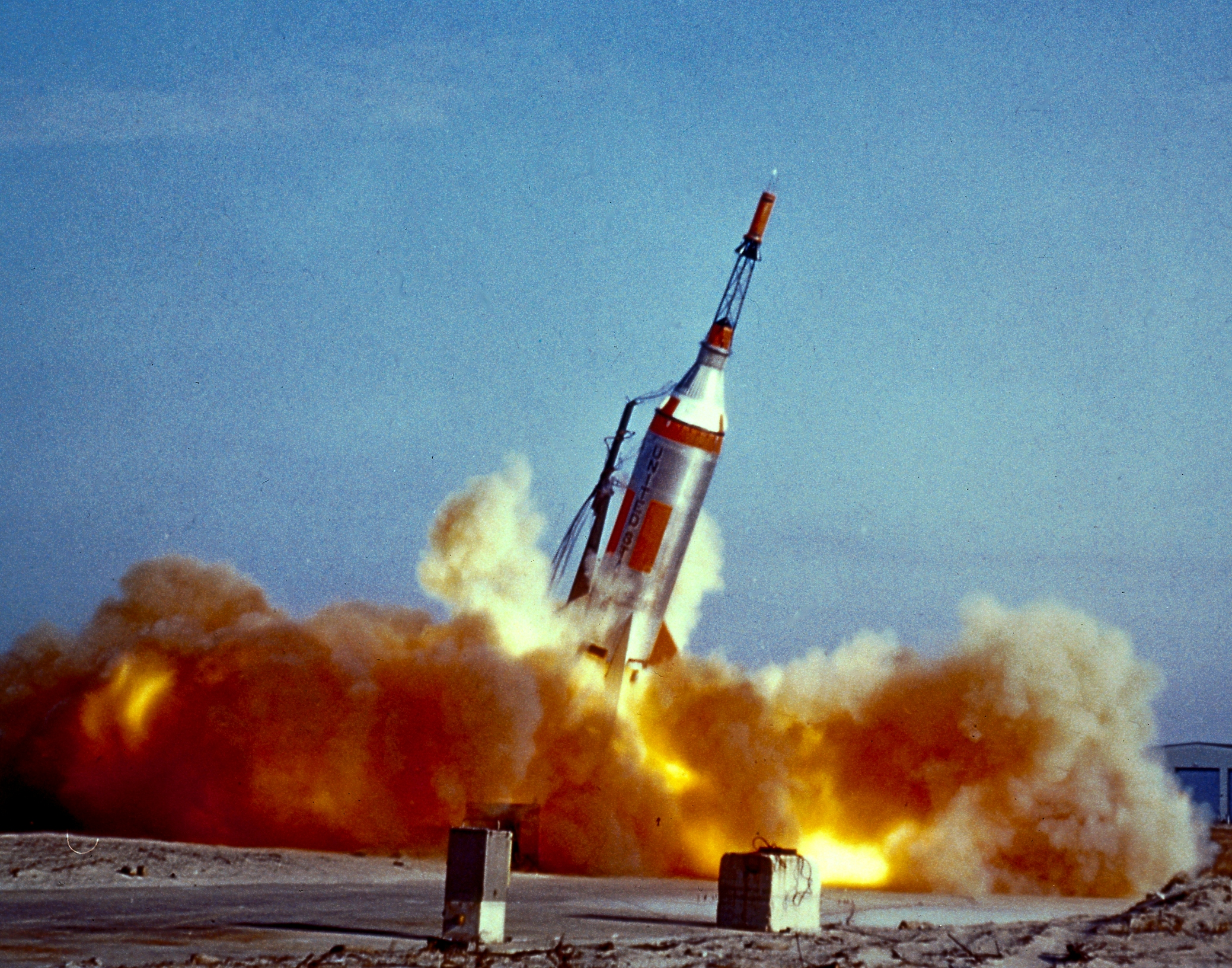
Launch of the Little Joe booster from Wallops Island, to test the Project Mercury capsule, 1960.

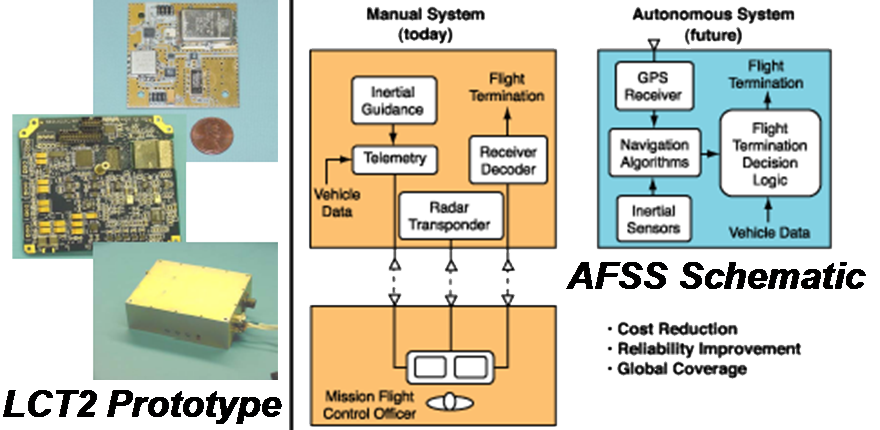
Low-Cost TDRSS Transceiver (LCT2) prototype hardware developed by WFF and schematic comparing WFF's Autonomous Flight Safety System (AFSS) to traditional (manual) flight safety system in use today

WFF's primary mission areas are as follows:

- Sounding Rockets
- Scientific Balloons
- Aircraft
- Range and Mission Management
- Small Launch Vehicle Research
- Mission Planning Lab

With its sounding rocket, aircraft, and balloon flights carrying scientific payloads, its aeronautical systems testing, its range support for Space Shuttle launches, and its educational outreach activities, WFF supports all of NASA's Mission Directorates and practically all of their respective themes:

- Science Mission Directorate
  - Earth Science
  - Solar System Exploration
  - The Universe
  - Heliophysics
- Exploration Mission Directorate
  - Constellation Systems
  - Exploration Systems Research and Technology
  - Human Systems Research and Technology
- Aeronautics Mission Directorate
  - Aeronautics Technology
- Space Operations Mission Directorate
  - International Space Station
  - Space Shuttle
  - Space and Flight Support

== Facility directors ==
These people served as the director of the Wallops Flight Facility:

No.	Image	Director	Start	End	Notes
1		Robert L. Krieger	June 30, 1948	July 31, 1981	
Acting		Abraham D. Spinak	August 1, 1981	September 30, 1981	
2		Warren Keller	October 1, 1981	February 23, 1989	
3		Joseph P. McGoogan	February 24, 1989	January 3, 1995	
4		Arnold Torres	January 8, 1995	January 3, 2002	
5		John Campbell	January 13, 2002	December 31, 2009	
Acting		William Wrobel	January 1, 2010	January 18, 2010	
6		William Wrobel	January 19, 2010	February 2019	
acting		David L. Pierce	February 2019	2019	
7		David L. Pierce	2019	present	

== Commercial spaceport ==
In 1998, the Virginia Commercial Space Flight Authority, later joined by Maryland, built the Mid-Atlantic Regional Spaceport at Wallops on land leased from NASA. In December 2006, the facility made its first launch. In 2018, Rocket Lab announced their plan to launch their Electron rocket from the facility, and in January 2023 the first Electron launch from Wallops took place at the new Launch Pad 0C. In 2022, Rocket Lab announced their plan to launch their larger Neutron rocket from the facility, and in August 2025 they unveiled the newly completed Launch Pad 0D.

== Visitor center ==
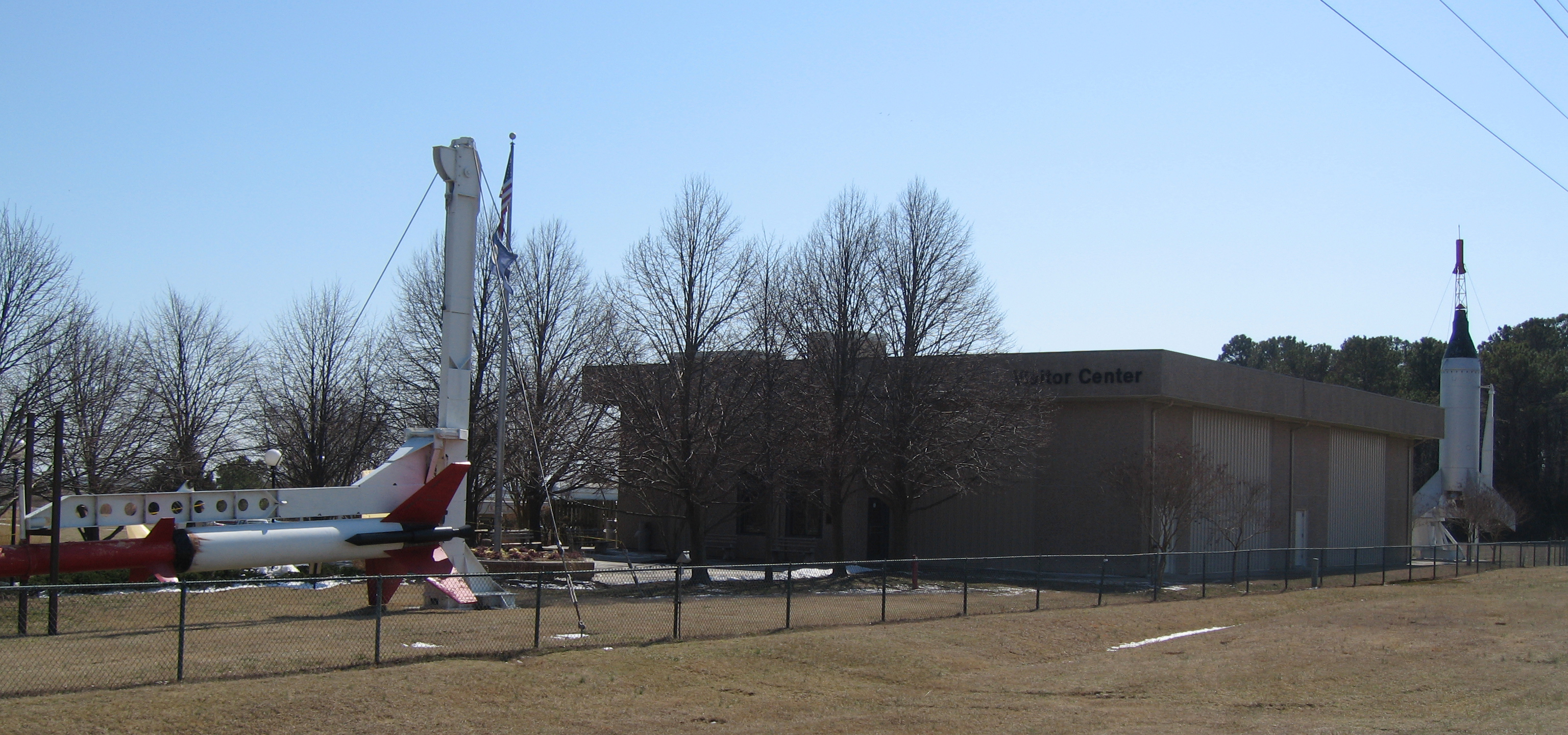
NASA Visitor Center at Wallops Flight Facility

The Wallops Visitor Center has a variety of hands-on exhibits and hosts weekly educational activities and programs to enable children to explore and learn about the technologies designed and used by NASA researchers and scientists. In addition, one Saturday each month, NASA invites model rocketry enthusiasts to launch their own rockets from the WFF rocket launch site. NASA personnel also participate, launching models of various rockets and explaining the spacecraft they carry in real life.

The schedule for sounding rocket launches from WFF is posted on its official Web site.

=== Education ===
For many years WFF was home to the NSIP Sub-SEM and SEM projects. NSIP stands for the NASA Student Involvement Project, the Sub-SEM project was to design one of four experiments that would be inserted into an ORION-II one-stage rocket and launched above 98 percent of the atmosphere, and experience over 30 Gs of centrifugal force, while SEM was to design an experiment that would be flown on a future Space Shuttle mission. Each project gave 16 students and four teachers (four students and one teacher from each high school) the opportunity to spend an almost all-expense-paid week at WFF. Normally the students and teachers stayed in the Mariner Motel, now a Holiday Inn, conducting experiments and learning about the facility. Following the presidential mandate and budget cuts the entire NSIP program, SEM and Sub-SEM included, was shut down.

== Accidents ==
On April 2, 1957, a Lockheed P2V-6 Neptune exploded in midair after takeoff from what was then known as Naval Auxiliary Air Station Chincoteague. All eleven occupants of the aircraft died.

On October 23, 1995, the maiden flight of a Conestoga 1620 rocket failed 46 seconds after liftoff, resulting in disintegration. EER Space Systems, Conestoga's manufacturer, concluded that low frequency noise from an unknown source upset the guidance system on the rocket causing it to order course corrections when none were needed. The rocket went off course when its first stage steering mechanism ran out of hydraulic fluid and became inoperable. After this failure, the Conestoga program was terminated, and EER abandoned the launch business. At the time of the launch, the Conestoga was the largest rocket ever launched from Wallops Island, and it was the first orbital mission attempted from the facility since 1985. The company's launch pad at Wallops Island were the first commercially built facilities in the US. 14 scientific experiments, some of which were planned to return from orbit, were destroyed. All debris landed in the Atlantic Ocean. There were no injuries.

On October 27, 1998, a Learjet 45 was destroyed at Wallops after a loss of control during a water ingestion test flight. Only minor injuries to a copilot and flight engineer were reported. There were no ground injuries. The airplane was being used to test a new nose wheel tire. For the test, the airplane was passed through a "pool" or "trough" of water on the runway at different speeds. The pilot failed to obtain/maintain alignment with the water pool and lost control. The plane departed the left side of the runway, and struck a pickup truck parked adjacent to the runway.

On August 22, 2008, an ALV X-1 sounding rocket was intentionally destroyed 20 seconds into flight after veering too far off course.

On October 28, 2014, a failure occurred in an Antares rocket, carrying Cygnus CRS Orb-3, shortly after launch and destroyed both the rocket and the payload at the adjacent Mid-Atlantic Regional Spaceport on Launch Pad 0A.

== Alliances ==
The NASA Wallops Flight Facility has alliances with a number of organizations important to its mission and future growth. Some examples include:

- Mid-Atlantic Regional Spaceport (MARS)
- U.S. Navy Surface Combat Systems Center (SCSC)
- Navy Test and Training Ranges
- U.S. Space Force Space Launch Delta 45, Eastern Range
- U.S. Coast Guard
- National Oceanic and Atmospheric Administration (NOAA), National Environmental Satellite, Data, and Information Service (NESDIS)
- Marine Science Consortium (MSC)
- White Sands Missile Range (WSMR)

It has also worked with the National Security Agency in experiments involving ionized clouds for communications interception during the Cold War.

== Image gallery ==
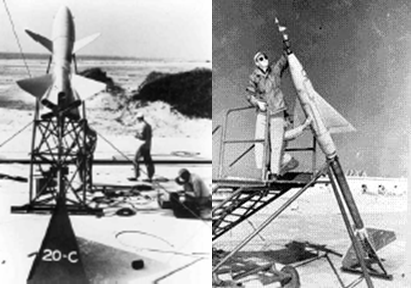
Early research rockets at Wallops Island

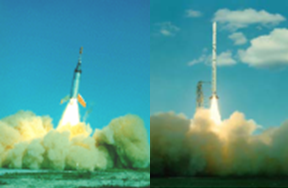
Wallops flight tests of Mercury capsule escape tower and Apollo heat shield aboard a Scout

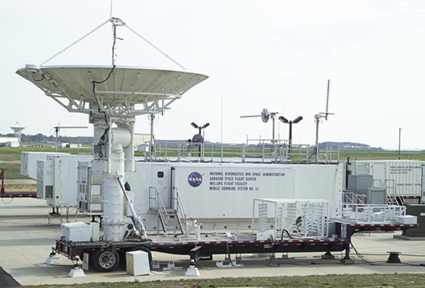
Mobile Range Systems

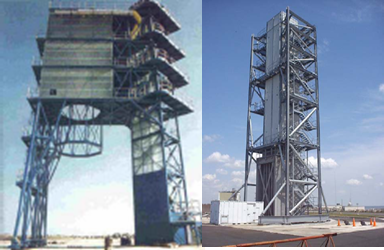
Launch Pads 0-A and 0-B

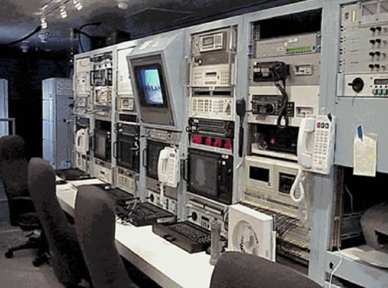
Mobile Telemetry System

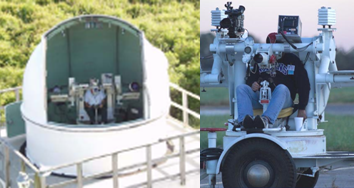
Optical Tracking Systems

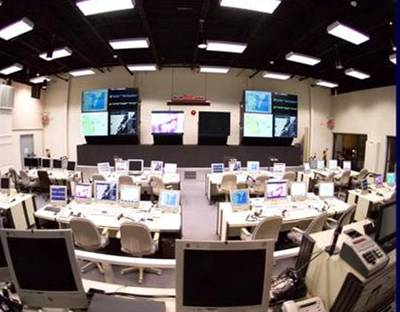
Range Control Center

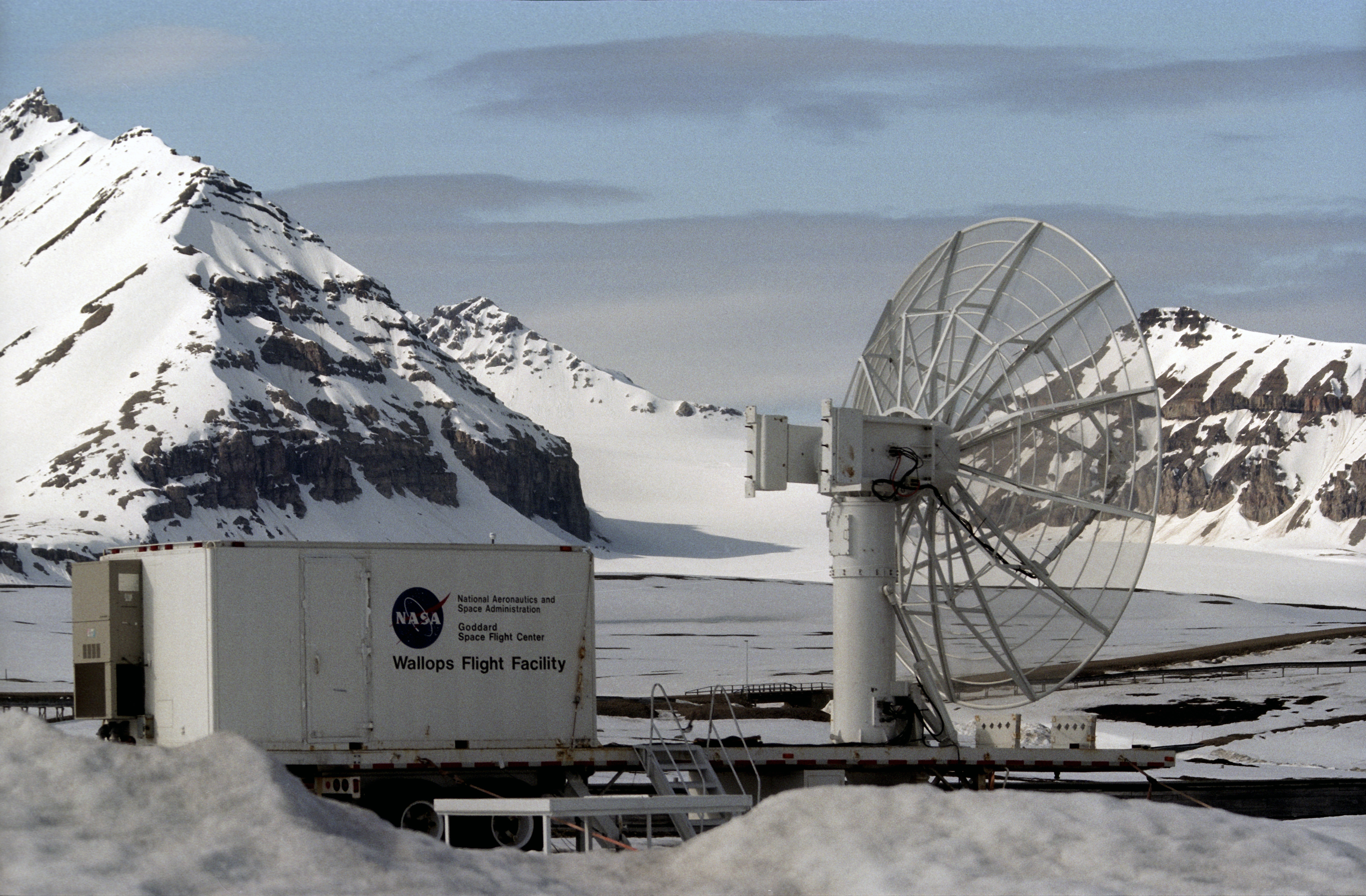
Mobile system at the SvalRak launch site at Ny-Ålesund, Norway (2003)

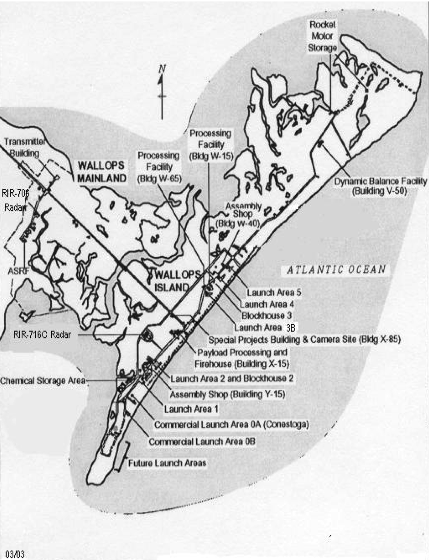
Wallops Island Map

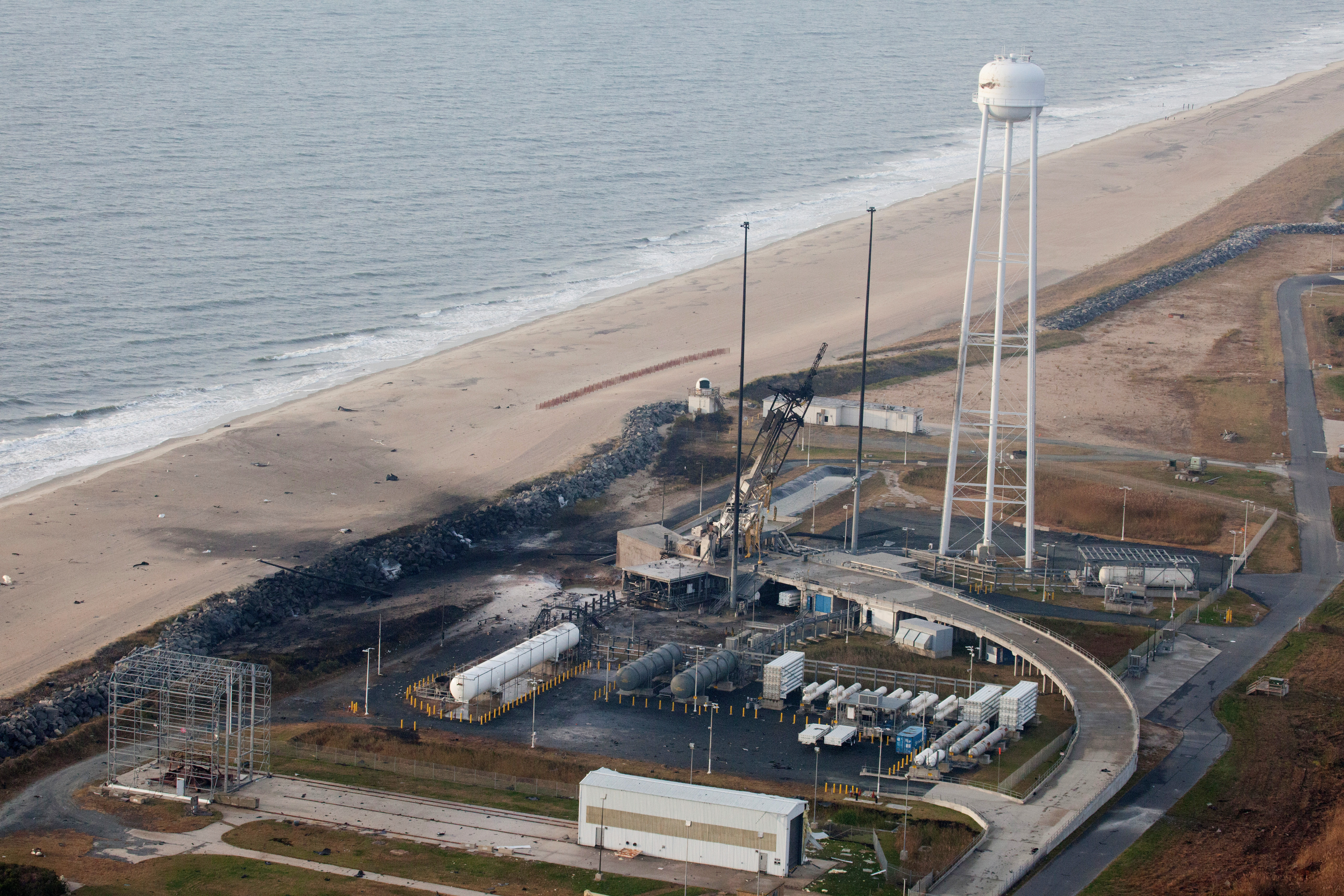
Antares Orb-3 explosion at Pad 0-A

== See also ==
- List of space companies and facilities in Virginia
