= Mercury-Redstone 1 =

Test flight of the Redstone rocket and Mercury spacecraft

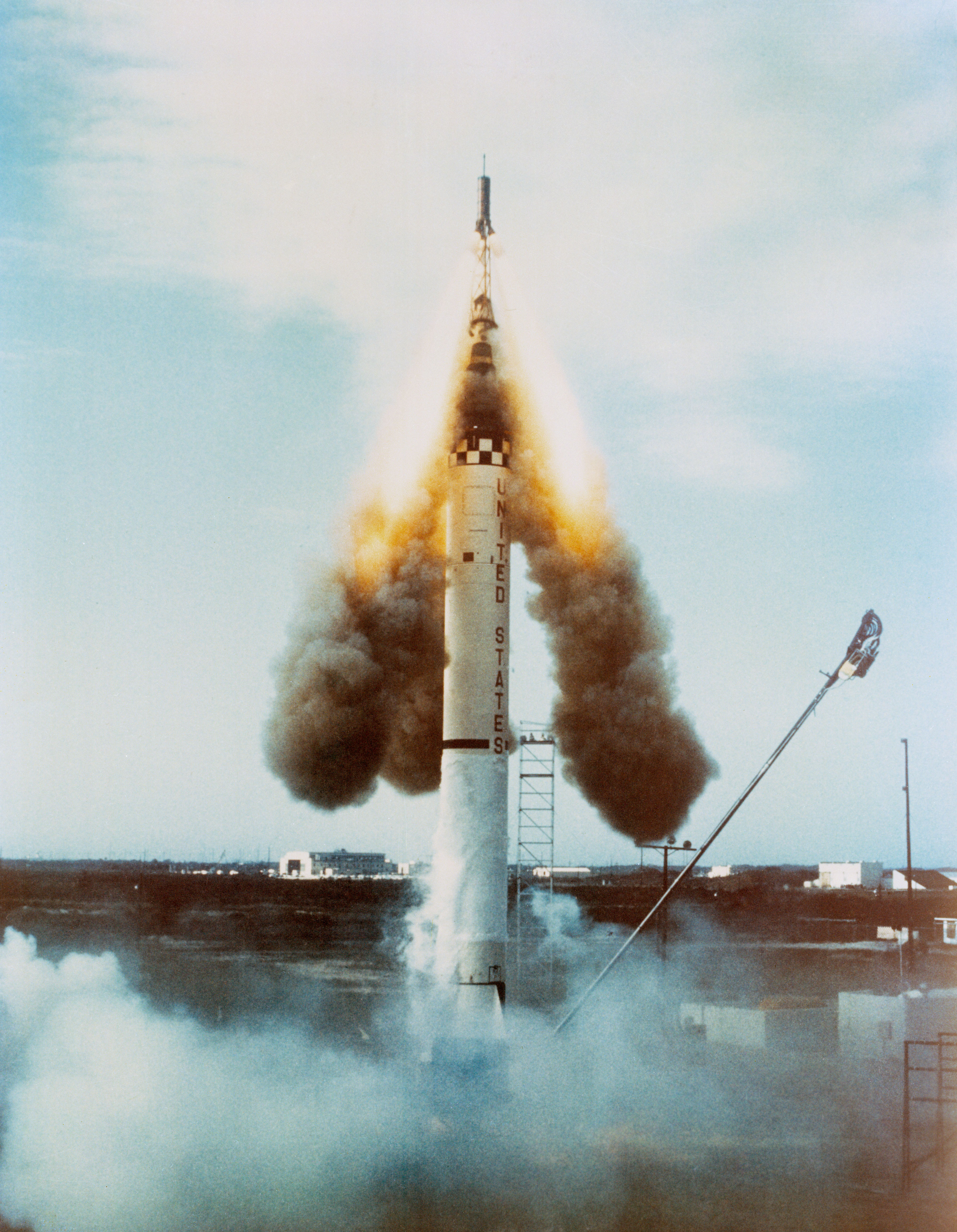
- MR-1 launching the escape rocket.
- Mission type: Test flight
- Operator: NASA
- Mission duration: 2 seconds Launch failure
- Apogee: ~4 inches (10 cm)

Spacecraft properties
- Spacecraft: Mercury No. 2
- Manufacturer: McDonnell Aircraft
- Launch mass: 1,230 kilograms (2,720 lb) (Note: This is the mass of the spacecraft after separation from the launch vehicle, including all spacecraft consumables. It excludes the escape tower, which would be jettisoned before spacecraft separation, and the spacecraft-launch vehicle adapter, which would remain attached to the launch vehicle. Note that Mercury spacecraft #2 lacked some of the equipment present in the spacecraft used on the crewed Mercury flights.)

Start of mission
- Launch date: November 21, 1960, 14:00 UTC
- Rocket: Redstone MRLV MR-1
- Launch site: Cape Canaveral LC-5

Mercury-Redstone 1 (MR-1) was the first Mercury-Redstone uncrewed flight test in Project Mercury and the first attempt to launch a Mercury spacecraft with the Mercury-Redstone Launch Vehicle. Intended to be an uncrewed sub-orbital spaceflight, it was launched on November 21, 1960 from Cape Canaveral Air Force Station, Florida. The launch failed in an abnormal fashion: immediately after the Mercury-Redstone rocket started to move, it shut itself down and settled back on the pad, after which the capsule jettisoned its escape rocket and deployed its recovery parachutes. The failure has been referred to as the four-inch flight, for the approximate distance traveled by the launch vehicle. Investigators later found that an electrical connector disconnected in the wrong order, causing the rocket to think the flight had ended and shut down its engine.

== Test background and launch failure ==
The purpose of the MR-1 flight was to qualify the Mercury spacecraft and the Mercury-Redstone launch vehicle for the sub-orbital Mercury mission. It would also qualify the spacecraft's automated flight control and recovery systems, as well as the launch, tracking, and recovery operations on the ground. The flight would also test the Mercury-Redstone's automatic inflight abort sensing system, which would be operating in open-loop mode. This meant that the abort sensing system could report a condition requiring an abort, but it would be unable to actually trigger an abort itself. Since the flight was uncrewed, this would not pose a safety problem, and it would prevent a faulty abort signal from prematurely ending the flight.

The test used Mercury spacecraft #2 together with Redstone MR-1; (Note: NASA used the prefix MR- both for Mercury-Redstone flights and for launch vehicle numbers. Sometimes, as in this case, the flight and launch vehicle numbers were the same, but not always. Some later sources use the prefix MRLV- for launch vehicle numbers, but this form does not seem to have been used by NASA.) its launch location was Cape Canaveral Air Force Station's Launch Complex 5. An early launch attempt on November 7 was canceled due to last-minute problems with the capsule, so launching was rescheduled for November 21.

On that day, following a normal countdown, the Mercury-Redstone's engine ignited on schedule at 9:00 a.m. Eastern Standard Time (14:00 GMT). However, the engine shut down immediately after lift-off from the launch pad. The rocket only rose about 4 inches (10 cm) before settling back onto the pad. Alarms were immediately sounded at LC-5, but the rocket did not explode. Instead it merely sat in place on the launch pad, after which an unusual sequence of events happened.

Immediately after the Redstone's engine shut down, the Mercury capsule's escape rocket jettisoned itself, leaving the capsule attached to the Redstone booster. The escape rocket rose to an altitude of 4,000 feet (1,200 m) and landed about 400 yards (370 m) away. Three seconds after the escape rocket fired, the capsule deployed its drogue parachute; it then deployed the main and reserve parachutes, ejecting the radio antenna fairing in the process.

In the end, all that had been launched was the escape rocket. However, the fully fueled and powered-up Redstone was now sitting on LC-5 with nothing securing it to the pad. Various other dangers existed as well, such as the capsule's retrorocket package and the range safety destruct charges. Furthermore, the capsule's main and reserve parachutes were hanging down the side of the rocket, threatening to tip it over if they caught enough wind; this did not occur, however, as the weather conditions were favorable. Amid the panicked atmosphere in the control room, the launch team was unable to come up with quick and viable options to rectify the situation. Flight director Chris Kraft rejected several unsafe interventions, including using a rifle to shoot holes in the booster's propellant tanks to depressurize them. He eventually took the advice of one of the test engineers to simply wait out the battery discharge and let the oxidizer boil off. This early test failure and subsequent panic led Kraft to declare "That is the first rule of flight control. If you don't know what to do, don't do anything." Technicians therefore waited until the next morning, when the flight batteries in the rocket and capsule had drained and the Redstone's liquid oxygen had boiled off, before they could work on the rocket and render it safe.

== Causes of the failure ==
Investigation revealed that the Redstone's engine shutdown was caused by two of its electrical cables separating in the wrong order. These cables were a control cable, which provided various control signals, and a power cable, which provided electrical power and grounding. Both cables were plugged into the rocket at the bottom edge of one of its tail fins and would separate at liftoff. The control cable was supposed to separate first, followed by the power cable. However, for this launch, the control cable was longer than expected—it was one designed for the military PGM-11 Redstone missile rather than the shorter cable designed for Mercury-Redstone. This control cable had been clamped to compensate for its greater length, but when the vehicle lifted off, the clamping did not work as planned and the control cable separation was delayed, eventually occurring about 29 milliseconds after the power cable had separated.

During this brief interval, the lack of electrical grounding caused a substantial current to flow through an electrical relay which was supposed to trigger normal engine cutoff at the end of powered flight. This relay tripped, causing the Redstone to shut off its engine and send a normal cutoff signal to the capsule. Under normal circumstances, when the capsule received this signal during a flight, it would do two things: it would jettison its escape rocket, which was no longer of any use, and after the escape rocket had flown clear, fire the explosive bolts holding the capsule to the booster, for separation. In the case of MR-1, the capsule did jettison the escape rocket as it was designed to, but the separation sequence did not occur. The capsule was designed to suspend this separation until the vehicle's acceleration had almost ceased, so that the capsule would not be hit by a still-accelerating launch vehicle. This would happen when the capsule's acceleration sensors detected an acceleration approaching 0 g, which it would normally experience after the Redstone had shut down and was entering free fall. However, in MR-1, the Redstone was not in free fall but rather sitting supported on the ground. Thus the capsule sensors detected the effect of their own supported weight, which they read as a constant acceleration of 1 g. Because of this apparent acceleration, capsule separation was disabled.

The jettison of the escape rocket activated the capsule's parachute recovery system. Since the altitude was below 10,000 feet (3,000 m), this system was triggered by its atmospheric pressure sensors and followed its usual sequence, with the drogue parachute deploying first, followed by the main parachute. But because the main parachute was not supporting the capsule's weight, the parachute system did not detect any load on this chute, so it acted as if the chute had failed and deployed the reserve parachute.

Since the Redstone's automatic inflight abort sensing system was running in open-loop mode, the engine shutdown did not trigger an abort. However, the system did report an abort condition, so it did function properly.

== Aftermath ==
The Redstone had suffered some minor damage from falling back on the pad, but it could still be used after refurbishment, so it was returned to Marshall Space Flight Center in Huntsville, Alabama, and was held in reserve. A new test flight was scheduled, Mercury-Redstone 1A (MR-1A), which would use a new Mercury-Redstone rocket, numbered MR-3. MR-1's Mercury spacecraft, #2, was undamaged, so it was reused for MR-1A, together with the escape rocket from spacecraft #8 and the antenna fairing from spacecraft #10. To prevent a failure like MR-1's from recurring, subsequent Mercury-Redstones added a grounding strap about 12 inches (30 cm) long to electrically connect the rocket to the launch pad. This strap was designed to separate from the rocket well after all other electrical connections to the ground had been severed.

Mercury engineers were also concerned that MR-1's failure had allowed a normal cutoff signal to reach the capsule and trigger the premature jettisoning of the escape rocket, since in an actual emergency this would remove the only escape mechanism for the astronaut. Had MR-1 been a crewed mission, the normal contingency would have been a pad abort, lifting the Mercury capsule off the booster and to safety via the escape rocket. Since the escape rocket had instead jettisoned itself from the capsule, the astronaut would have been left in a very precarious situation, stuck inside the Mercury capsule atop a fully fueled, fully independently powered, yet completely untethered and partially damaged Redstone booster. To prevent a situation like this, the Mercury-Redstone was altered so that it could not send a normal cutoff signal to the capsule until 129.5 seconds after liftoff, about 10 seconds before the expected time of the Redstone's actual engine cutoff.

MR-1 was never used for another flight after its return to Huntsville. It was eventually put on display at the Space Orientation Center of Marshall Space Flight Center.

== Current location ==
Mercury spacecraft #2, used in both the MR-1 and MR-1A flights, was displayed at the NASA Ames Exploration Center, Moffett Federal Airfield, near Mountain View, California. As of July 13, 2022, it is now on display at the Cradle of Aviation Museum in Garden City, New York. Other Mercury-Redstone rockets are on display at the U.S. Space & Rocket Center in Huntsville and elsewhere.

== Images ==
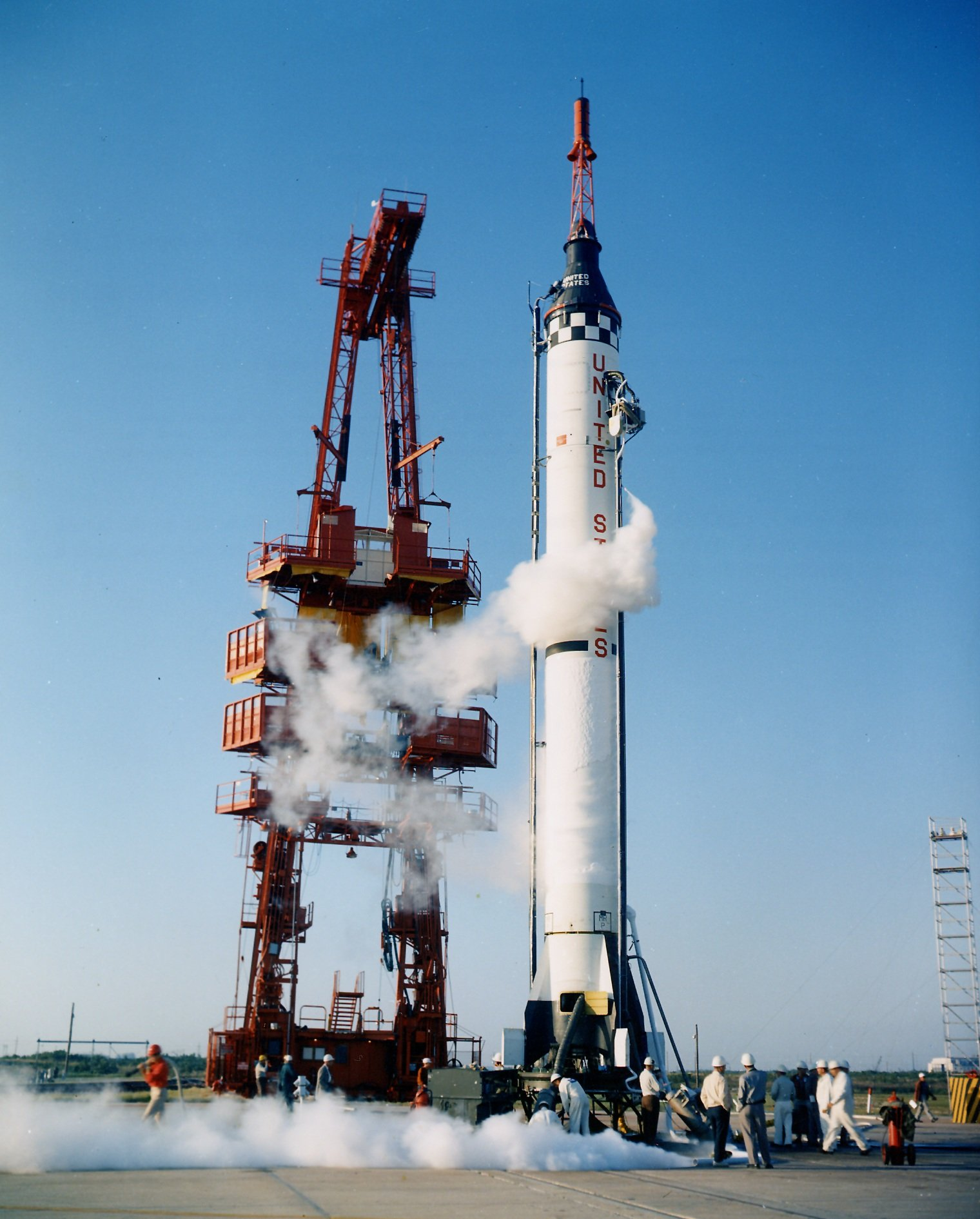
Fueling MR-1 in preparation for launch

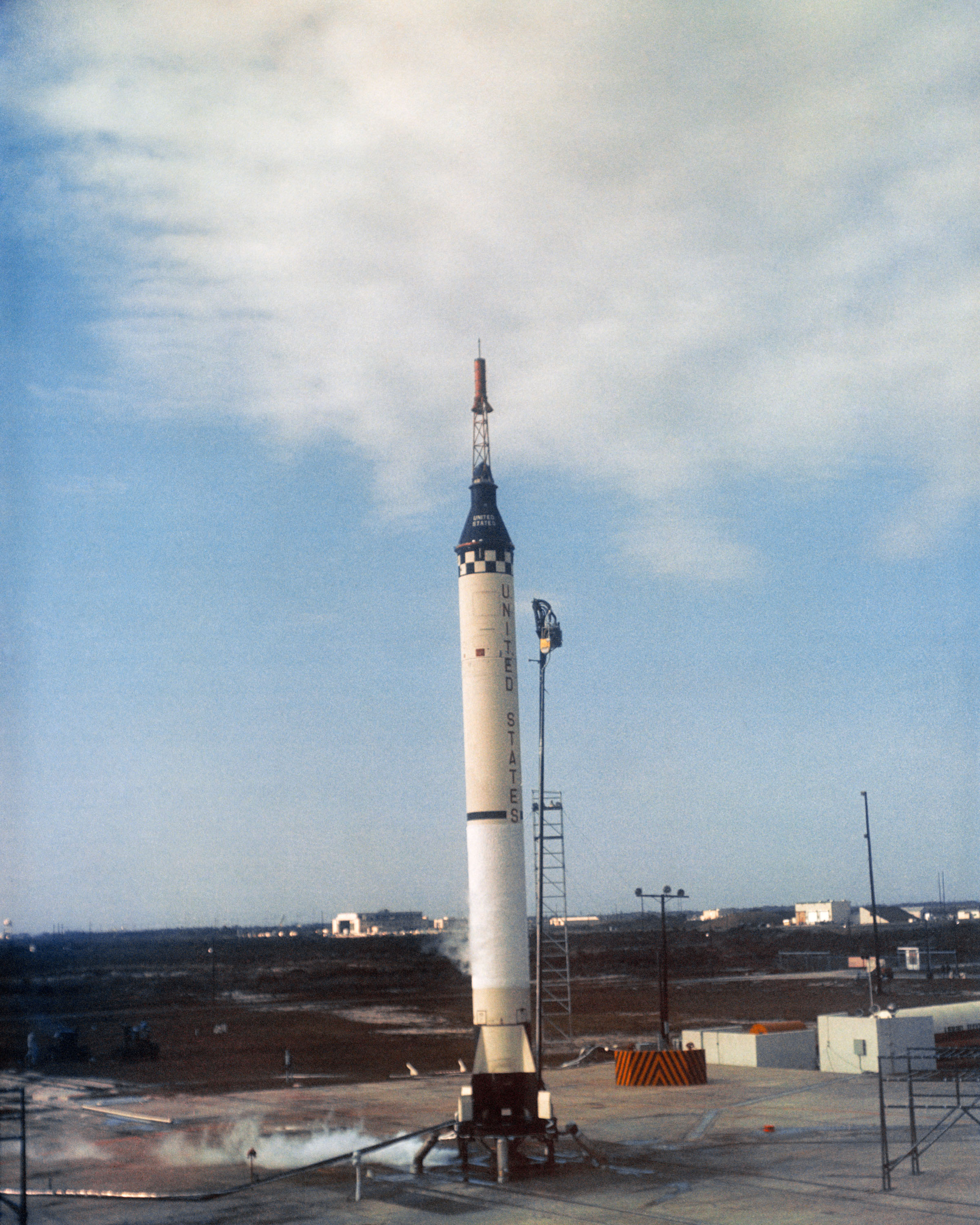
MR-1 at the moment of ignition

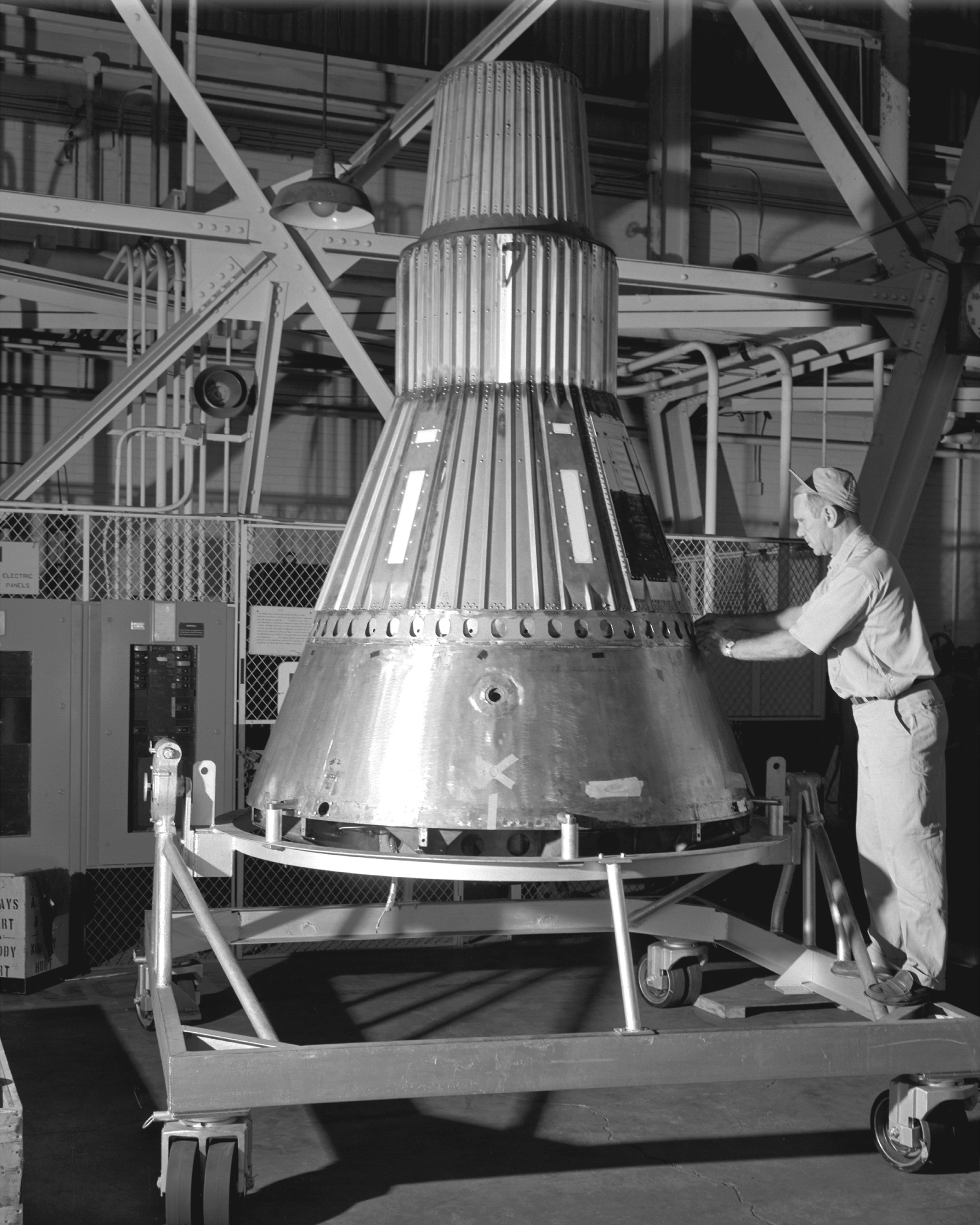
Mercury spacecraft #2 in an unfinished state at Lewis Hangar in 1959

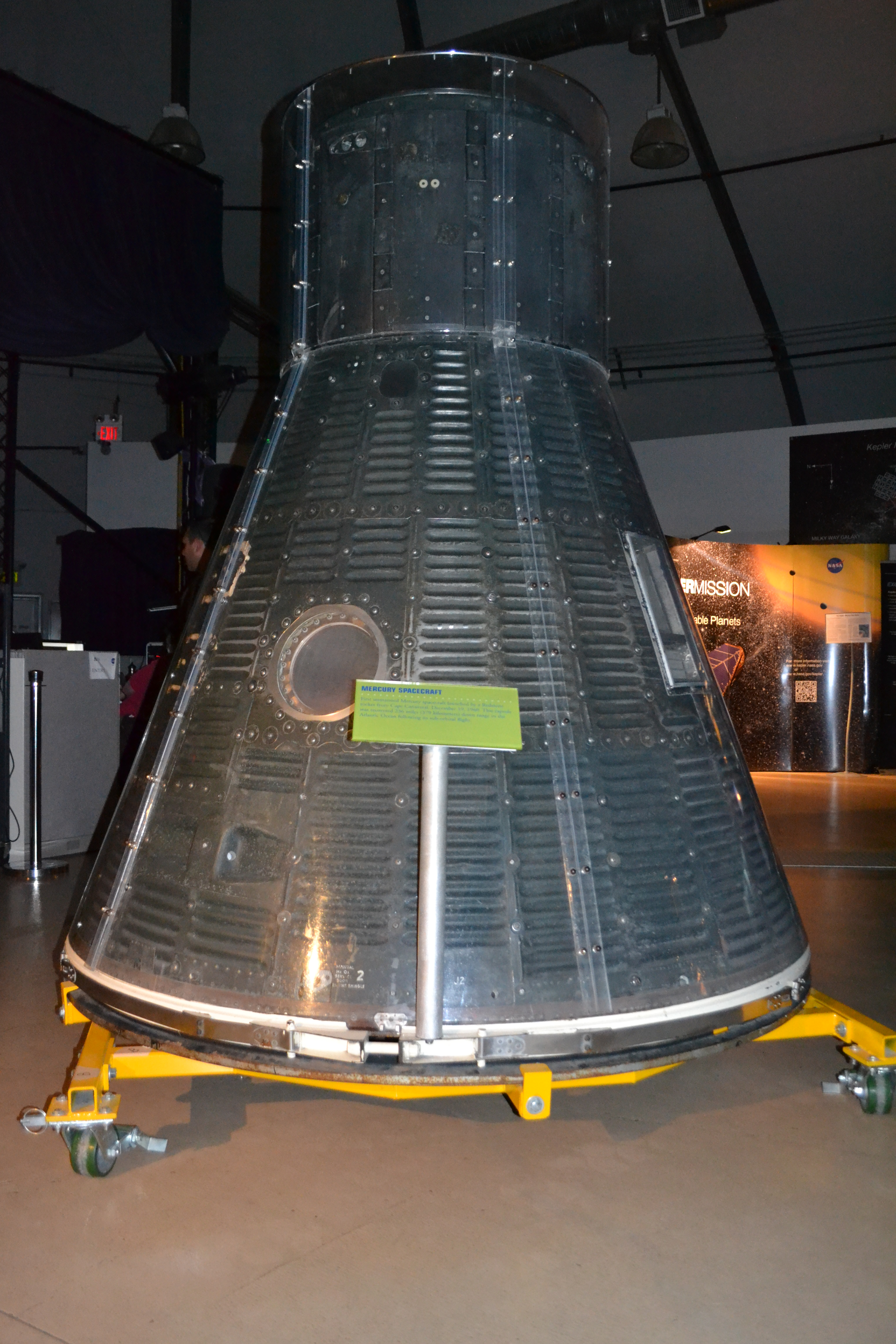
Spacecraft #2, used on both the MR-1 and MR-1A flights, on display at NASA Ames Exploration Center

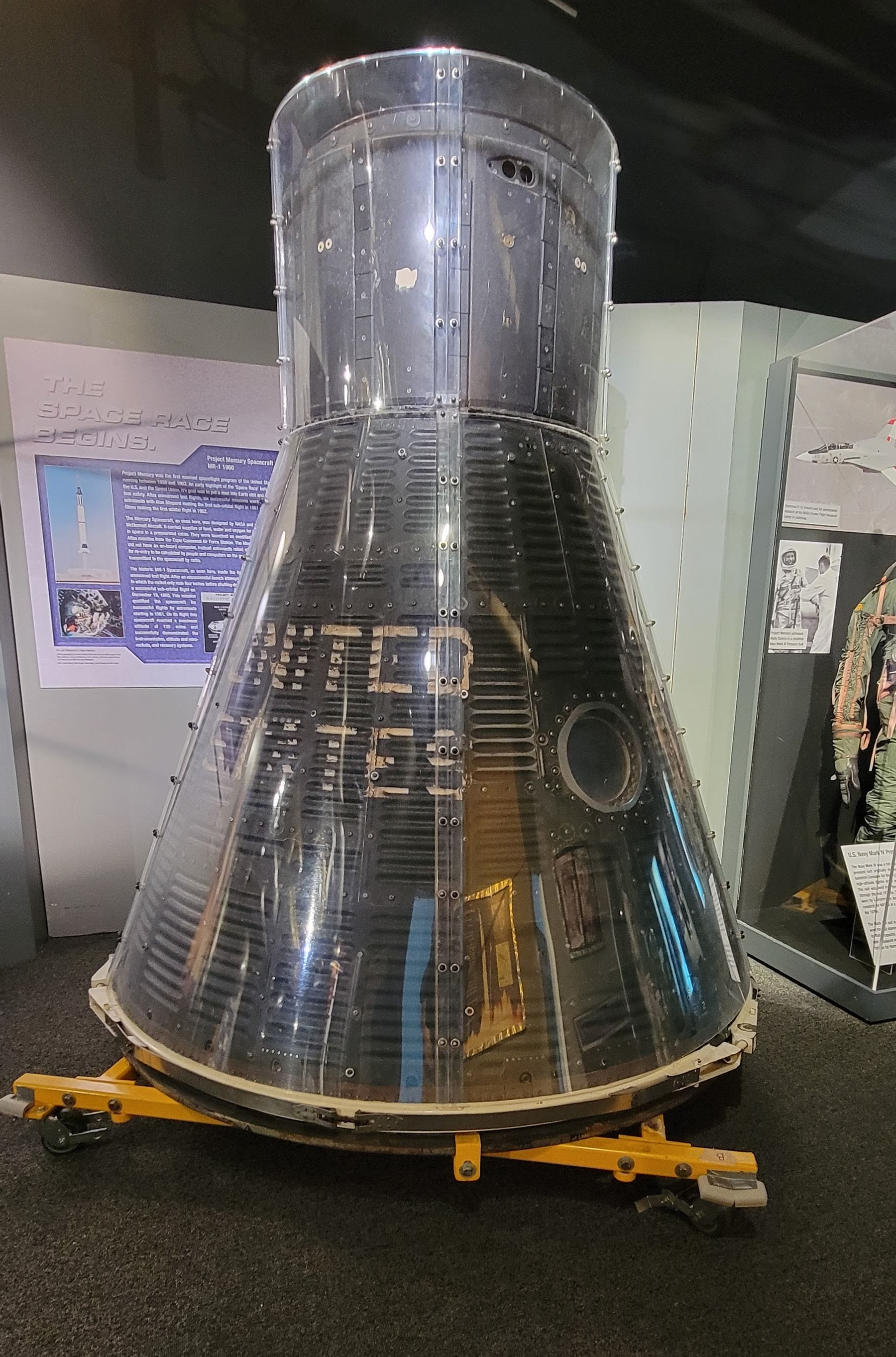
Mercury-Redstone 1 at the Cradle of Aviation Museum

== Bibliography ==
- Kranz, Gene (2000). Failure is not an option. New York, USA: Berkley Books. ISBN 0-425-17987-7.
