= NASA facilities =

Overview of NASA field centers

NASA field centers

There are NASA facilities across the United States and internationally. NASA Headquarters in Washington, D.C. provides overall policy direction and leadership for the agency. Ten field centers manage and execute NASA's programs and activities, with all other facilities assigned to the authority of at least one of these centers.

In 2013, a report by the NASA Office of Inspector General recommended the creation of a Base Realignment and Closure (BRAC)-style process to consolidate underutilized facilities. The report found that at least 33 of NASA's 155 facilities were underutilized.

== List of field centers ==
NASA has ten field centers. Four were inherited from its predecessor, the National Advisory Committee for Aeronautics (NACA), two were transferred from the United States Army, and four were commissioned and built by the agency after its formation in 1958.

=== Inherited from NACA ===
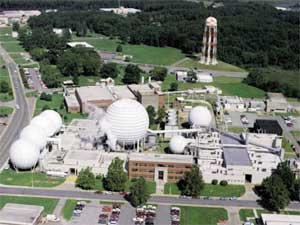
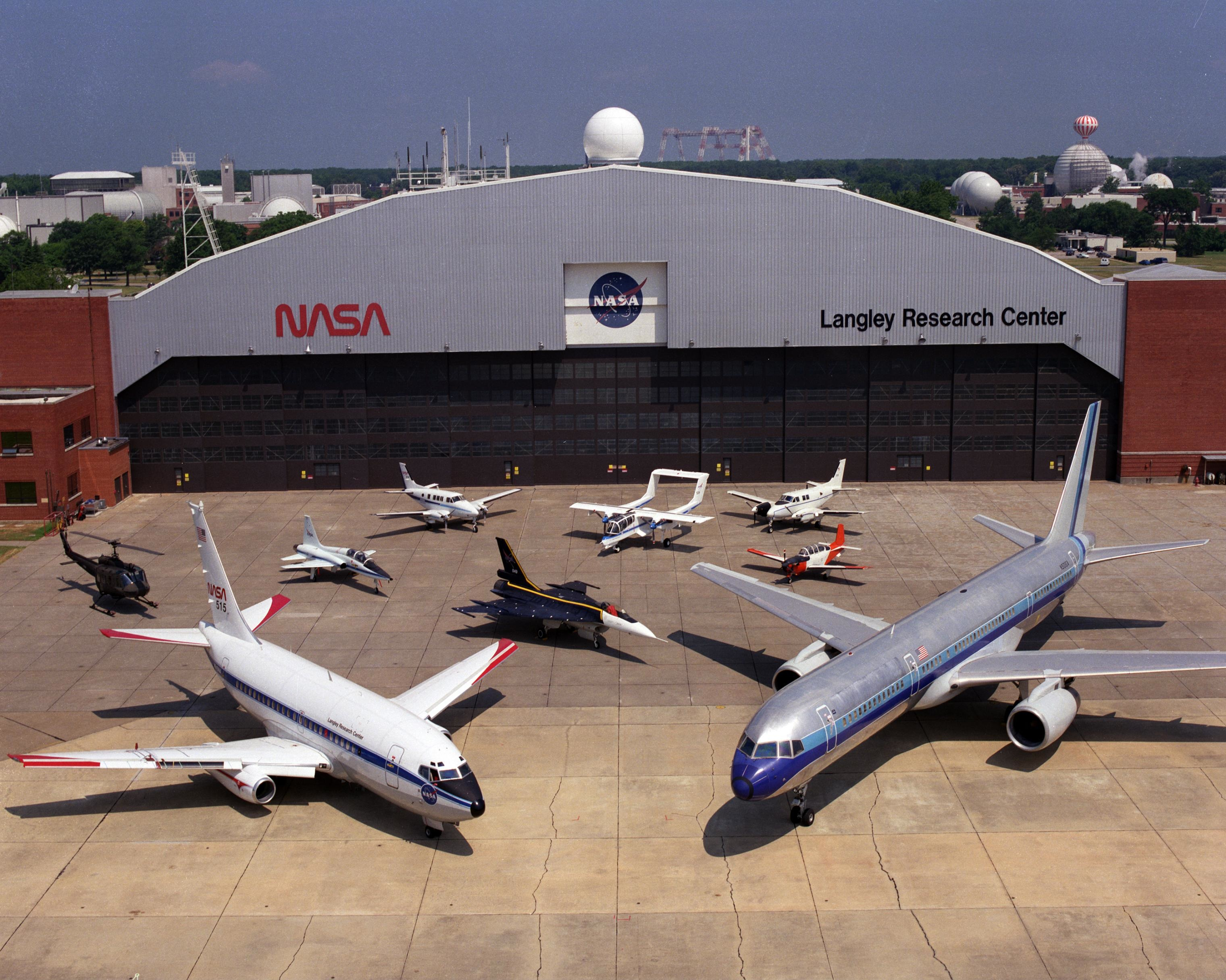
View of LaRC (left) and its research aircraft (right)

Langley Research Center, located in Hampton, Virginia, was established in 1917 by NACA and is the oldest of NASA's field centers. The center is named after aeronautics researcher Samuel Langley. The center conducts research in aeronautics and spaceflight, with aeronautics accounting for the majority of its work. It operates numerous wind tunnels used to study aircraft and spacecraft performance and safety. Langley also supported early human spaceflight programs, housing the Space Task Group responsible for Project Mercury until its relocation to Houston.

Ames Research Center, located at Moffett Field in Northern California, was established on December 20, 1939 and named after NACA founding member Joseph Sweetman Ames. Originally focused on wind tunnel research for propeller-driven aircraft, Ames has expanded to include work in aeronautics, spaceflight, and information technology. Its research areas include astrobiology, small satellites, robotic exploration, and thermal protection systems.

Glenn Research Center, located in Brook Park, Ohio, was established in 1942 as a laboratory for aircraft engine research. It was renamed in 1999 in honor of astronaut and U.S. senator John Glenn. The center conducts research in propulsion, power systems, communications, and materials for aeronautics and spaceflight. It has contributed technologies to programs ranging from early human spaceflight to the International Space Station.

Armstrong Flight Research Center, located at Edwards Air Force Base in Southern California, was established as a NACA facility for high-speed flight research in 1946. It was renamed in 2014 in honor of astronaut Neil Armstrong. The center conducts flight research using experimental and modified aircraft.

=== Transferred from the Army ===
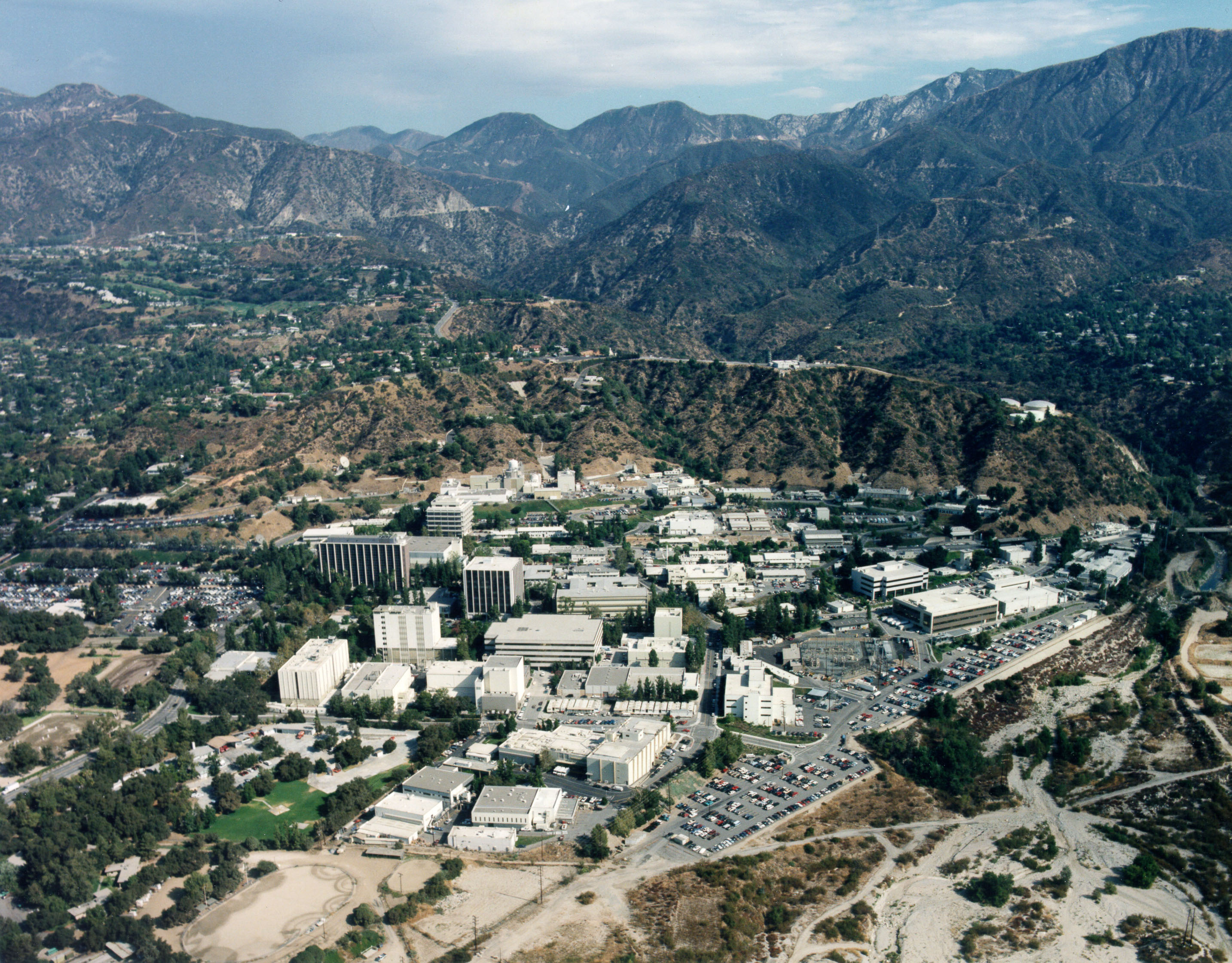
Jet Propulsion Laboratory campus

Jet Propulsion Laboratory (JPL), located in La Cañada Flintridge in Southern California, became part of NASA at its formation. The name reflects its original focus on jet-assisted propulsion systems. Managed by the California Institute of Technology, it designs and operates robotic spacecraft for planetary, Earth science, and astronomy missions. JPL also operates NASA's Deep Space Network, with tracking stations in California, Spain, and Australia.

Marshall Space Flight Center, located at Redstone Arsenal in Huntsville, Alabama, was transferred from the U.S. Army to NASA in 1958. It is named after U.S. Army General and statesman George C. Marshall. The center led development of the Saturn V rocket and Skylab. It supports propulsion systems, payload integration, and elements of the International Space Station. The center also oversees the Michoud Assembly Facility in New Orleans.

=== Built by NASA ===
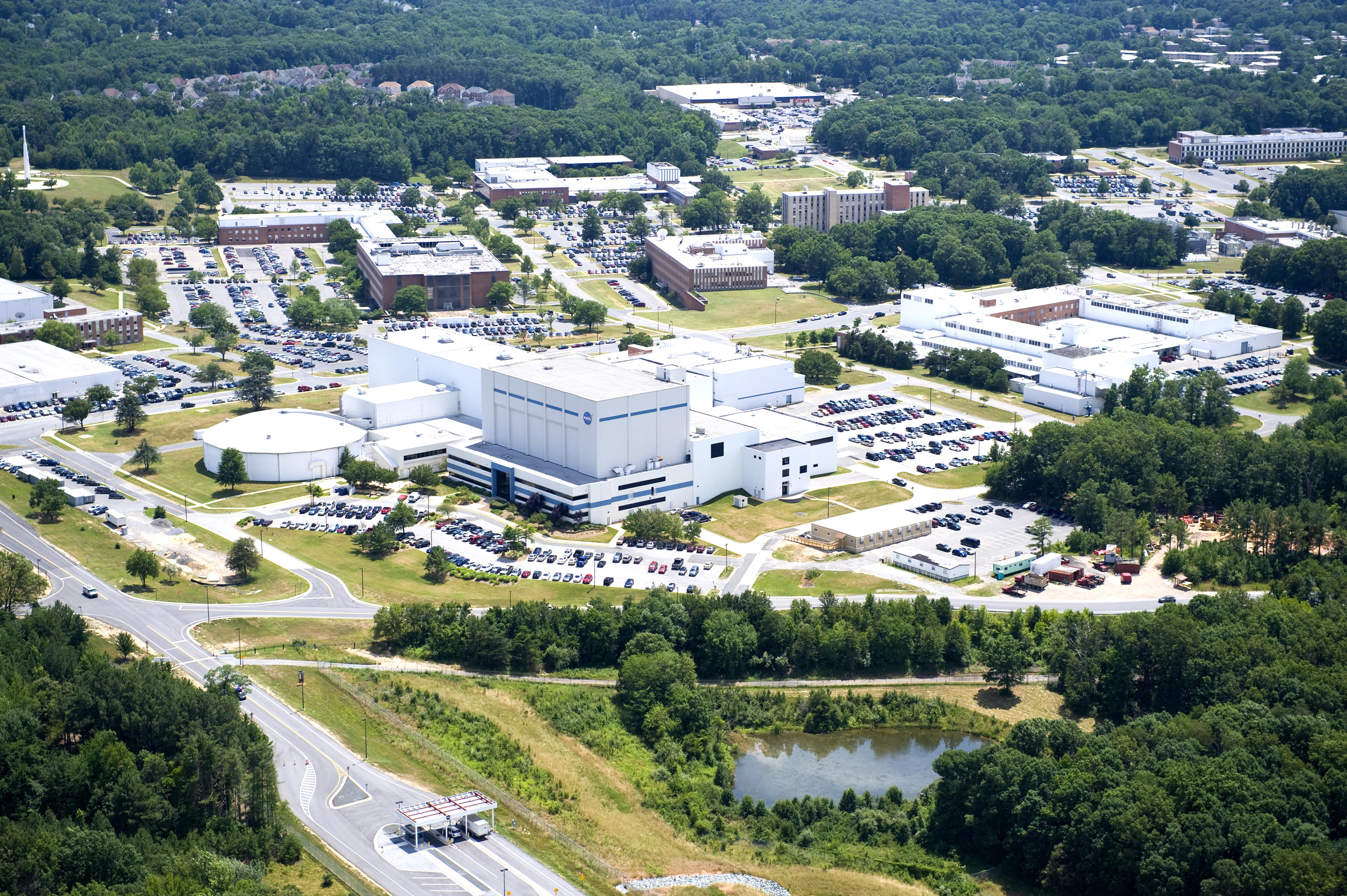
Goddard Space Flight Center campus

Goddard Space Flight Center, located in Greenbelt, Maryland, was established on March 1, 1959. It is named after American rocket pioneer Robert H. Goddard. The center develops and operates uncrewed scientific spacecraft and conducts research in Earth science, astrophysics, and planetary science. GSFC also manages spaceflight tracking networks and supports satellite programs, including those for the National Oceanic and Atmospheric Administration. The center also oversees the Wallops Flight Facility in Virginia, the Goddard Institute for Space Studies at New York's Columbia University, and the Katherine Johnson Independent Verification and Validation Facility in West Virginia.

Stennis Space Center, located in Hancock County, Mississippi, was first announced on October 25, 1961. It was named after U.S. senator John C. Stennis on May 20, 1988. The center tests rocket engines for government and commercial organizations.

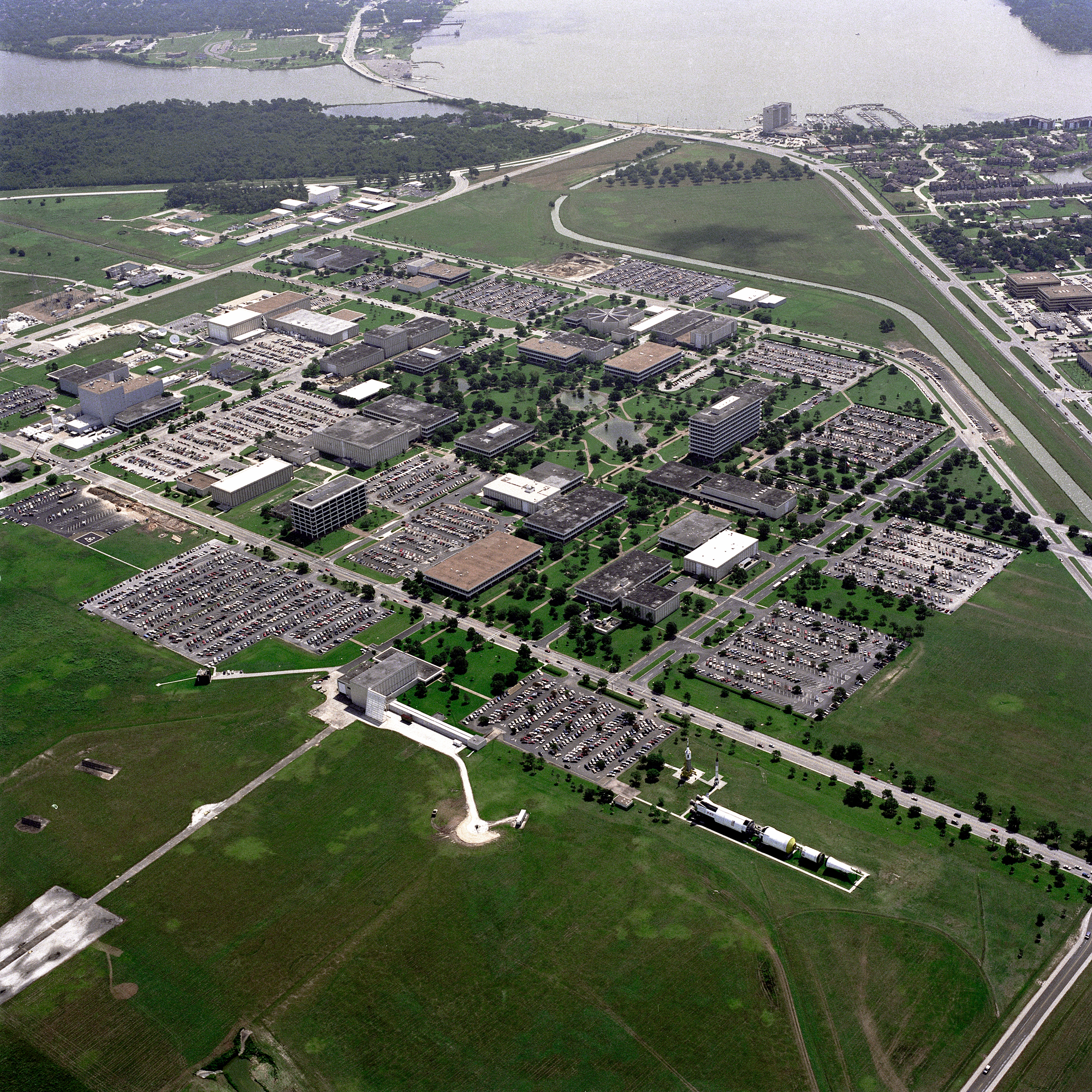
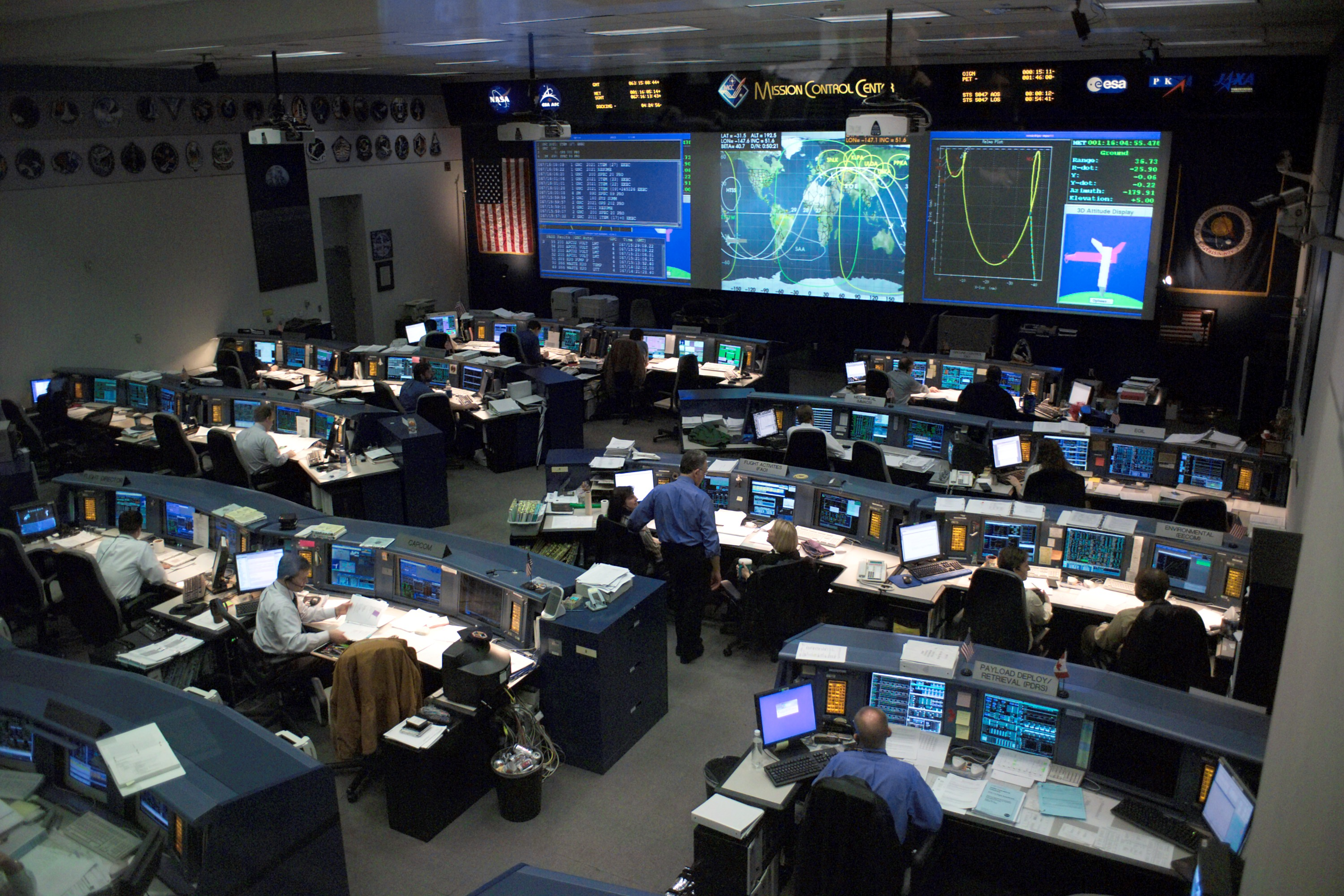
Aerial view of JSC in Houston, Texas (left) and Kraft Mission Control Center (right)

Johnson Space Center, located in Houston, Texas, was established on November 1, 1961 as the Manned Spacecraft Center. It was renamed in 1973 in honor of U.S. president Lyndon B. Johnson. The center manages astronaut training, mission control, and human spaceflight operations. It houses the NASA Astronaut Corps and the Christopher C. Kraft Jr. Mission Control Center. The center also oversees the White Sands Test Facility in New Mexico.

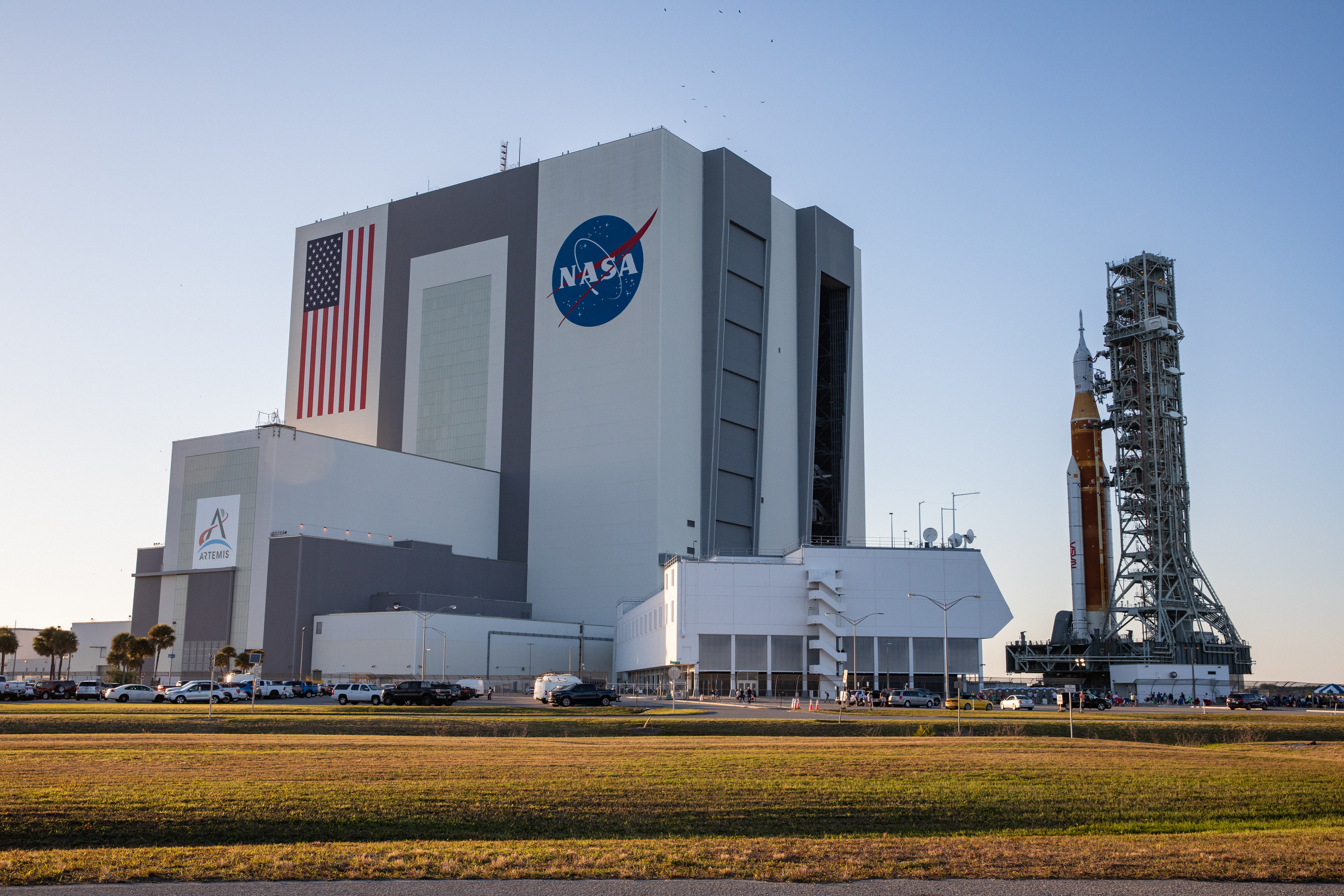
Space Launch System rocket exiting the Vehicle Assembly Building at Kennedy Space Center

Kennedy Space Center, located in Florida near Cape Canaveral, was established in 1962 as the Launch Operations Center. It was renamed in 1963 in honor of U.S. president John F. Kennedy. NASA's primary launch site for human spaceflight, the center includes the Vehicle Assembly Building, one of the largest structures by volume in the world.

== Organization ==
NASA Headquarters

- Ames Research Center
- Armstrong Flight Research Center
- Glenn Research Center
- Goddard Space Flight Center
  - Goddard Institute for Space Studies
  - Katherine Johnson Independent Verification and Validation Facility
  - Wallops Flight Facility
- Jet Propulsion Laboratory
  - NASA Deep Space Network
    - Goldstone Deep Space Communications Complex
    - Madrid Deep Space Communications Complex
    - Canberra Deep Space Communication Complex
- Johnson Space Center
  - White Sands Test Facility
- Kennedy Space Center
- Langley Research Center
- Marshall Space Flight Center
  - Michoud Assembly Facility
- Stennis Space Center

== List of minor facilities ==
=== Communication and telescope facilities ===
- NASA Infrared Telescope Facility, Hawaii
- Near Earth Network (NEN)
  - Poker Flat Research Range, Fairbanks North Star Borough, Alaska
- Space Network (SN)
  - Guam Remote Ground Terminal, Guam

== See also ==
- Category:NASA facilities
- Category:NASA groups, organizations, and centers
- List of NASA Visitor Centers
- Columbia Scientific Balloon Facility
- Crawlerway
- Lunar Sample Laboratory Facility
- National Transonic Facility
- Shuttle Landing Facility
