= Mercury-Redstone 1A =

Uncrewed suborbital test-flight of the Mercury spacecraft

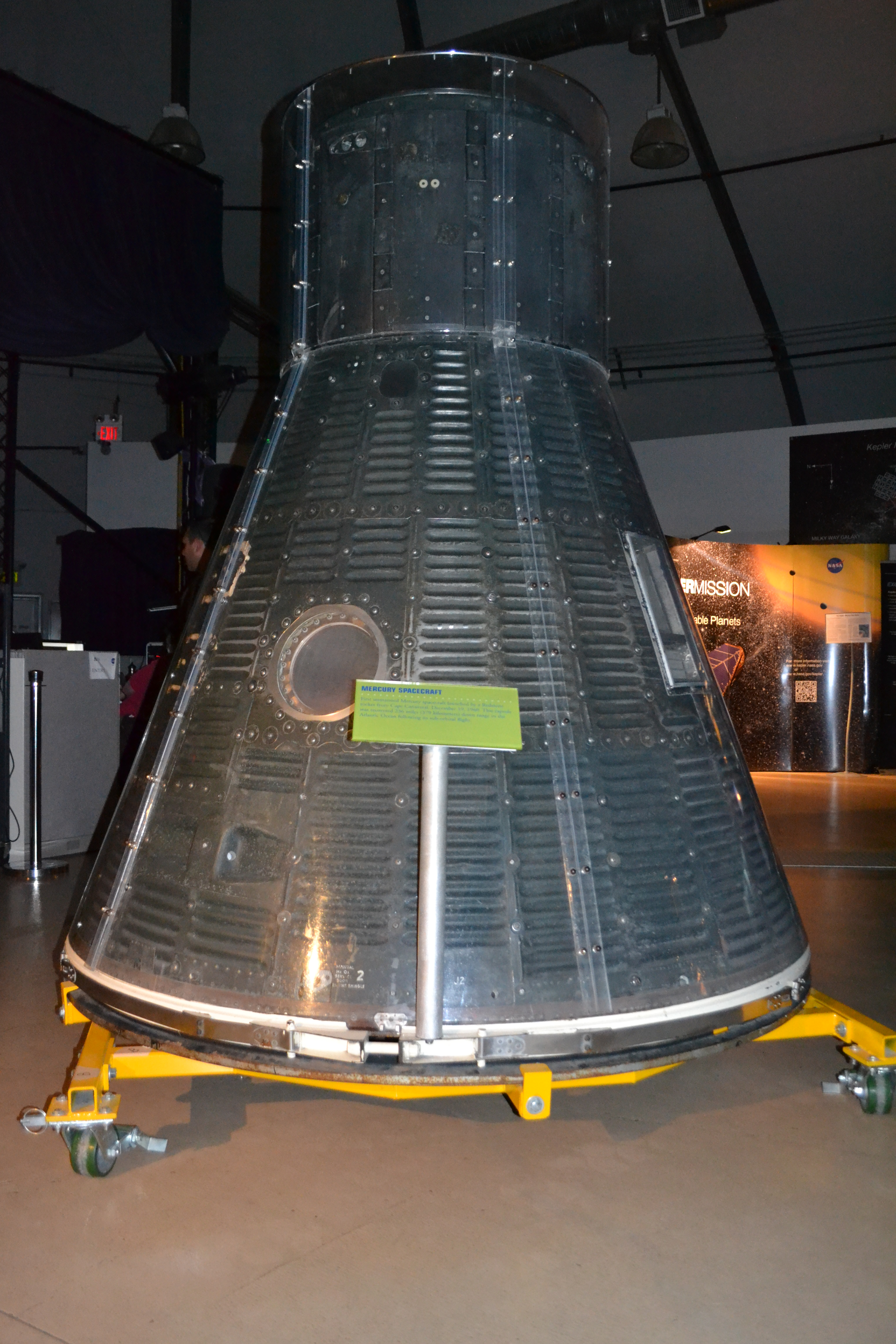
- Mercury spacecraft #2, used on both the MR-1 and MR-1A flights, on display at NASA Ames Exploration Center.
- Mission type: Test flight
- Operator: NASA
- Mission duration: 15 minutes, 45 seconds
- Distance travelled: 378.2 kilometers (235.0 mi)
- Apogee: 210.3 kilometers (130.7 mi)

Spacecraft properties
- Spacecraft: Mercury No.2
- Manufacturer: McDonnell Aircraft
- Launch mass: 1,230 kilograms (2,720 lb) (Note: This is the mass of the spacecraft after separation from the booster, including all spacecraft consumables. It excludes the escape tower, which was jettisoned before spacecraft separation, and the spacecraft-booster adapter, which remained attached to the booster. Note that Mercury spacecraft #2 lacked some of the equipment present in the spacecraft used on the crewed Mercury flights.)

Start of mission
- Launch date: December 19, 1960, 16:15 UTC
- Rocket: Redstone MRLV MR-3
- Launch site: Cape Canaveral LC-5

End of mission
- Recovered by: USS Valley Forge
- Landing date: December 19, 1960, 16:30 UTC

Mercury-Redstone 1A (MR-1A) was launched on December 19, 1960 from LC-5 at Cape Canaveral, Florida. The mission objectives of this uncrewed suborbital flight were to qualify the spacecraft for space flight and qualify the system for an upcoming primate suborbital flight. The spacecraft tested its instrumentation, posigrade rockets, retrorockets and recovery system. The mission was completely successful. The Mercury capsule reached an altitude of 130 miles (210 km) and a range of 235 miles (378 km). The launch vehicle reached a slightly higher velocity than expected - 4,909 miles per hour (7,900 km/h). The Mercury spacecraft was recovered from the Atlantic Ocean by recovery helicopters about 15 minutes after landing. Mercury Spacecraft #2 was reflown on MR-1A, together with the escape tower from Capsule #8 and the antenna fairing from Capsule #10. Redstone MRLV-3 was used. The flight time was 15 minutes and 45 seconds.

== Mercury-Redstone suborbital flight events ==
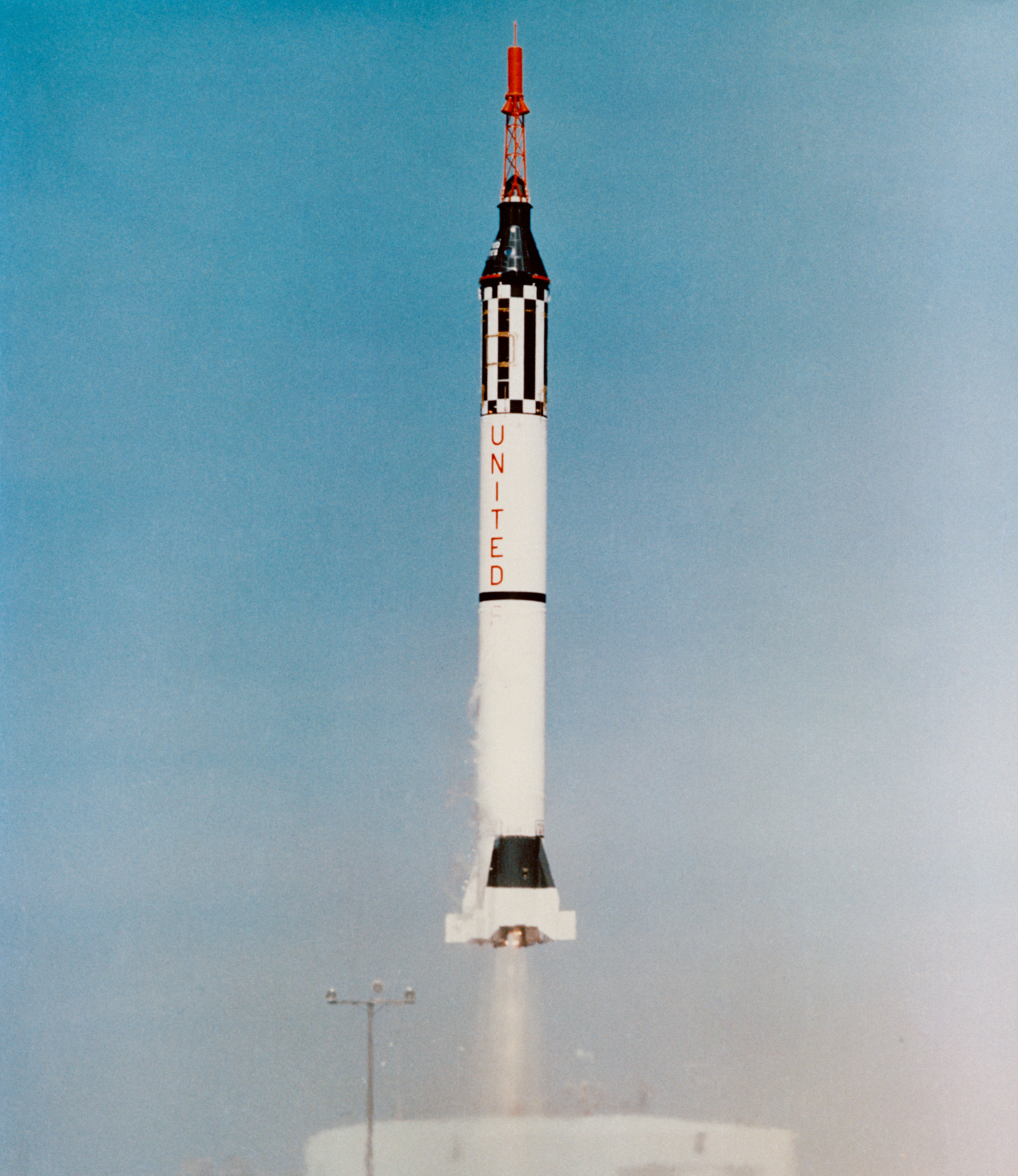
MR-1A Launch

T+ Time	Event	Description
T+00:00:00	Liftoff	Mercury-Redstone lifts off, onboard clock starts.
T+00:00:24	Pitch Program	Redstone pitches over from 90 deg to 41 deg.
T+00:01:24	Max Q	Maximum dynamic pressure ~575 lb/ft^{2} (27,500 Pa)
T+00:02:12	End Pitch Program	Redstone reaches 41 deg pitch.
T+00:02:20	BECO	Redstone engine shutdown - Booster Engine Cutoff. Velocity 5,200 mph (8,400 km/h)
T+00:02:22	Tower Jettison	Escape Tower Jettison
T+00:02:24	Capsule Separation	Posigrade rockets fire for 1 s giving 15 ft/s (4.6 m/s) separation.
T+00:02:35	Turnaround Maneuver	Capsule (ASCS) system rotates capsule 180 degrees, to heat shield forward attitude. Nose is pitched down 34 degrees to retro fire position.
T+00:05:00	Apogee	Apogee of about 115 miles (185 km) reached at 150 miles (240 km) downrange from launch site.
T+00:05:15	Retrofire	Three retrorockets fire for 10 seconds each. They are started at 5 second intervals, firing overlaps. Delta V of 550 ft/s (170 m/s) is taken off forward velocity.
T+00:05:45	Retract Periscope	Periscope is automatically retracted in preparation for reentry.
T+00:06:15	Retro Pack Jettison	One minute after retrofire, retro pack is jettisoned, leaving heatshield clear.
T+00:06:20	Retro Attitude Maneuver	(ASCS) orients capsule in 34 degrees nose down pitch, 0 degrees roll, 0 degrees yaw.
T+00:07:15	.05 G Maneuver	(ASCS) detects beginning of reentry and rolls capsule at 10 deg/s to stabilize capsule during reentry.
T+00:09:38	Drogue Parachute Deploy	Drogue parachute deployed at 22,000 ft (6,700 m) slowing descent to 365 ft/s (111 m/s) and stabilizing capsule.
T+00:09:45	Snorkel Deploy	Fresh air snorkel deploys at 20,000 ft (6,100 m). (ECS) switches to emergency oxygen rate to cool cabin.
T+00:10:15	Main Parachute Deploy	Main parachute deploys at 10,000 ft (3,000 m). Descent rate slows to 30 ft/s (9.1 m/s).
T+00:10:20	Landing Bag Deploy	Landing Bag Deploys, dropping heat shield down 4 ft (1.2 m).
T+00:10:20	Fuel Dump	Remaining hydrogen peroxide fuel automatically dumped.
T+00:15:30	Splashdown	Capsule lands in water about 300 miles (480 km) downrange from launch site.
T+00:15:30	Rescue Aids Deploy	Rescue aid package deployed. The package includes green dye marker, recovery radio beacon and whip antenna.

== Current location ==
Mercury spacecraft #2, used in both the Mercury-Redstone 1 and Mercury-Redstone 1A missions, was displayed at the NASA Ames Exploration Center, Moffett Federal Airfield, near Mountain View, California until 2022 when it was relocated to the Cradle of Aviation Museum in Garden City, NY.

== See also ==
- Splashdown
