= Wallops Flight Facility Visitor Center =

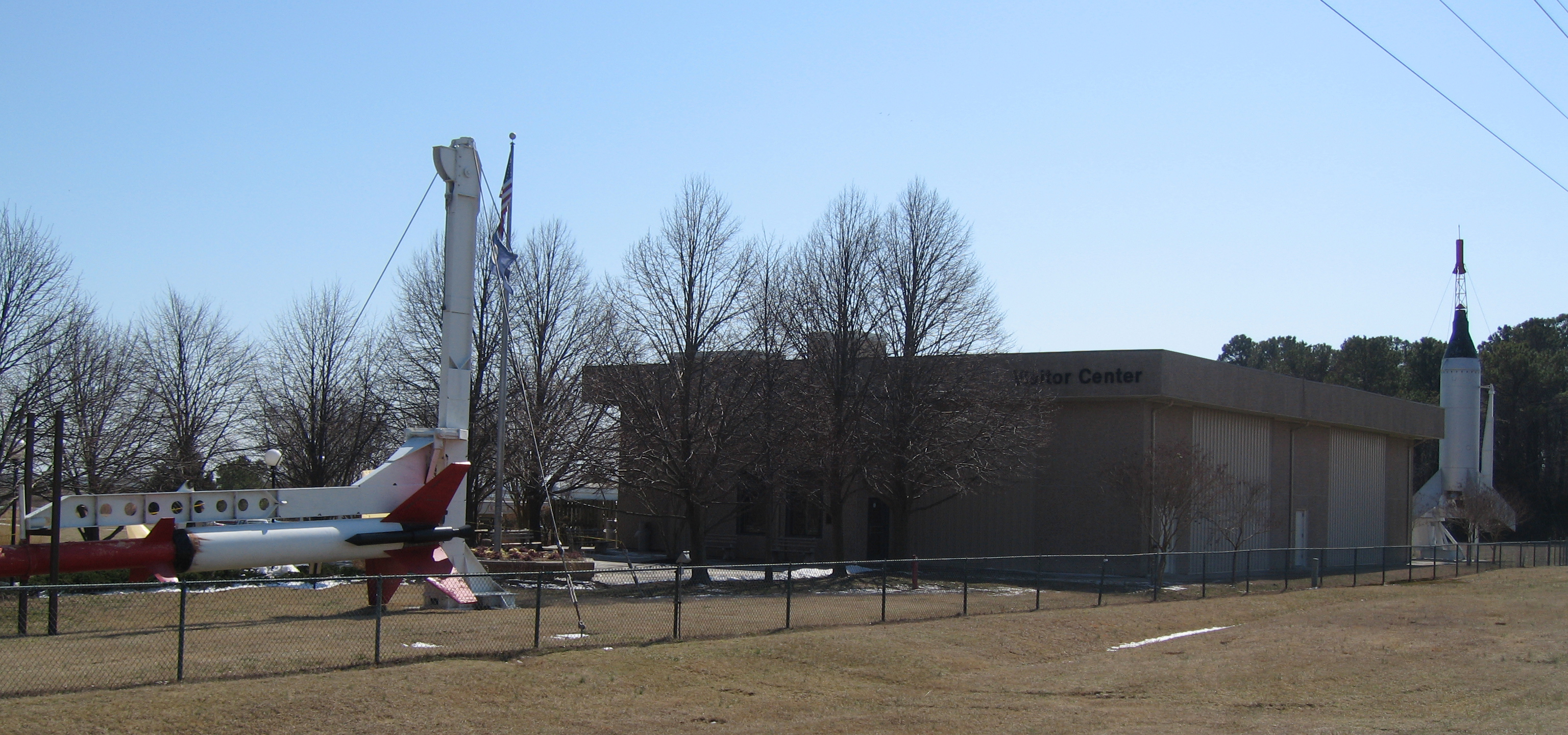
- Established: 1982
- Location: Building J-17; Wallops Island, Virginia, United States
- Coordinates: 37.9386°N 75.45736°W
- Type: Space museum
- Website: Wallops Flight Facility Visitor Center - NASA

The Wallops Flight Facility Visitor Center is a public museum and NASA visitor center located at NASA's Wallops Flight Facility on the Eastern Shore of Virginia.

The center is located in Building J-17, along Route 175 between Chincoteague and Wattsville. It contains exhibits highlighting past missions conducted at the Wallops Flight Facility. The visitor center also provides information about current activities at Wallops Flight Facility, such as the sounding rocket, balloon and aircraft program, and educational programs on Earth and space science.

The outside grounds include a rocket garden consisting of rockets and aircraft used for space and aeronautical research, including a full-scale four-stage reentry vehicle used to study the Earth's atmosphere. The center also provides a public viewing area for rocket launches, situated seven miles from the launchpads on Wallops Island and the Mid-Atlantic Regional Spaceport.

In 2024, the center hosted 41,578 visitors as well as 3,598 spectators for rocket launches.

== History ==
The visitor center was established in 1982. It is named the Robert L. Krieger Education Complex after the long term head of Wallops Flight Facility.

In August 2025, Wallops employees reportedly received an internal email notice of plans to close the visitor center on October 1st. Local officials, the Wallops employee union, and Virginian state and federal lawmakers swiftly expressed concerns and opposition to the plans, noting that a closure would reduce economic traffic to the region and lower public engagement at a time when flight operations at Wallops are expanding. A couple weeks later, Wallops Flight Facility Director David Pierce stated in an address to the Accomack County Board of Supervisors that the visitor center would remain open.

== Exhibits ==
Some exhibits include:

- Moon rock from Apollo 17
- Scale models of rockets, satellites, research equipment and aircraft
- Science On a Sphere
- Hands-on interactive demonstrations and educational videos
- Observation deck for watching launches from Wallops Flight Facility
- Model rocket launches
- Earth As Art

== Image gallery ==
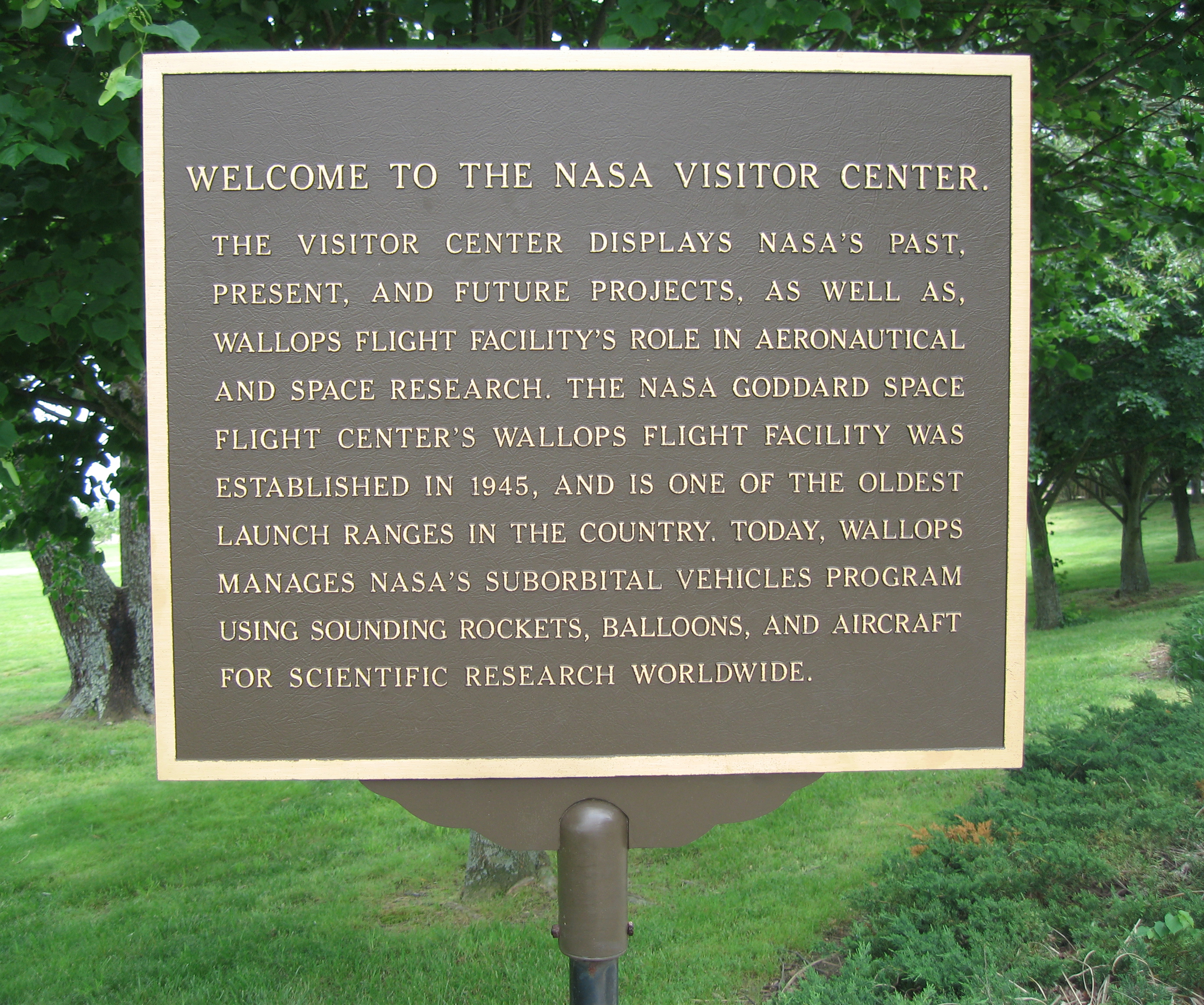
"Welcome to the NASA Visitor Center"

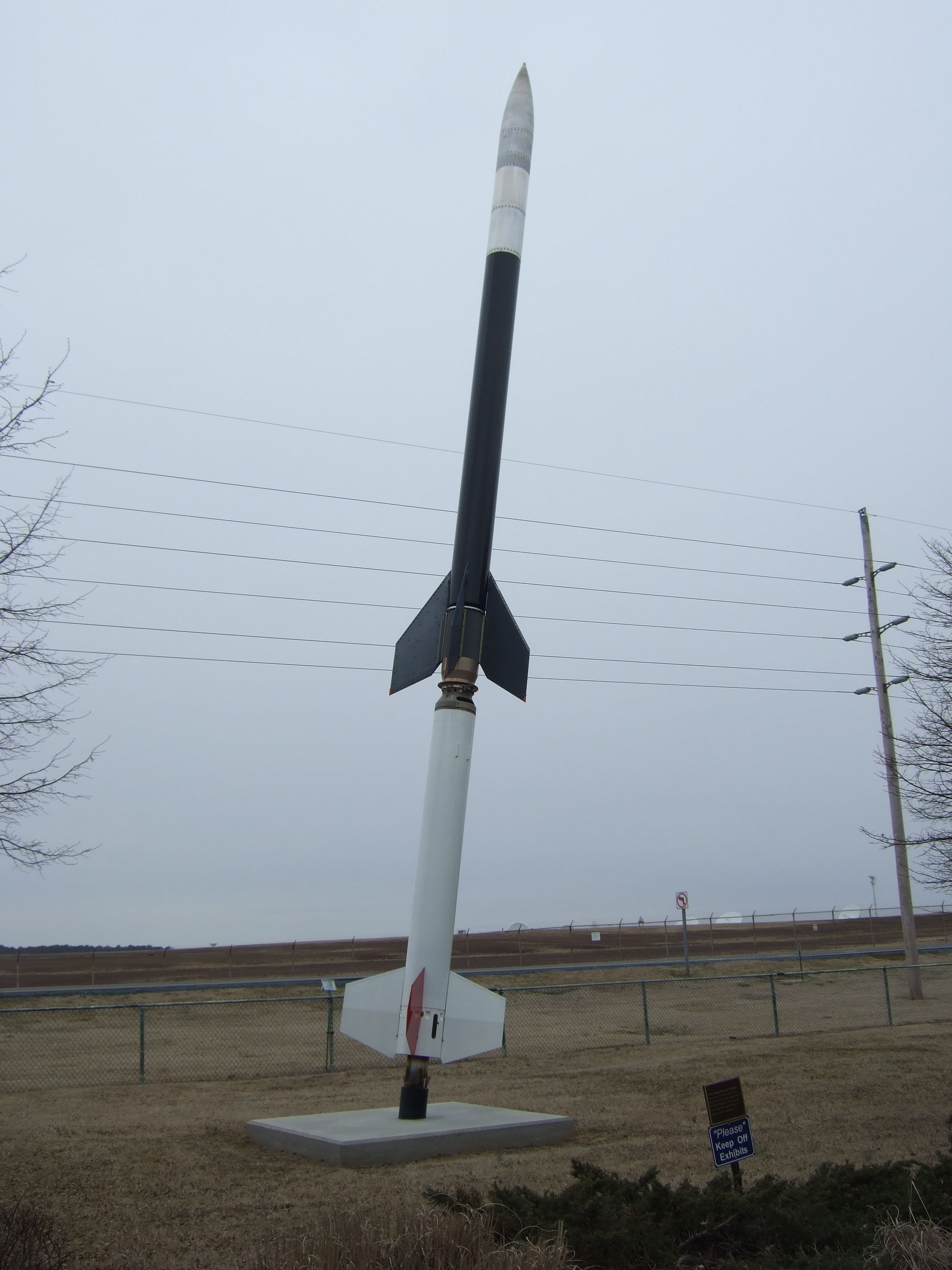
Four-Stage Reentry Vehicle

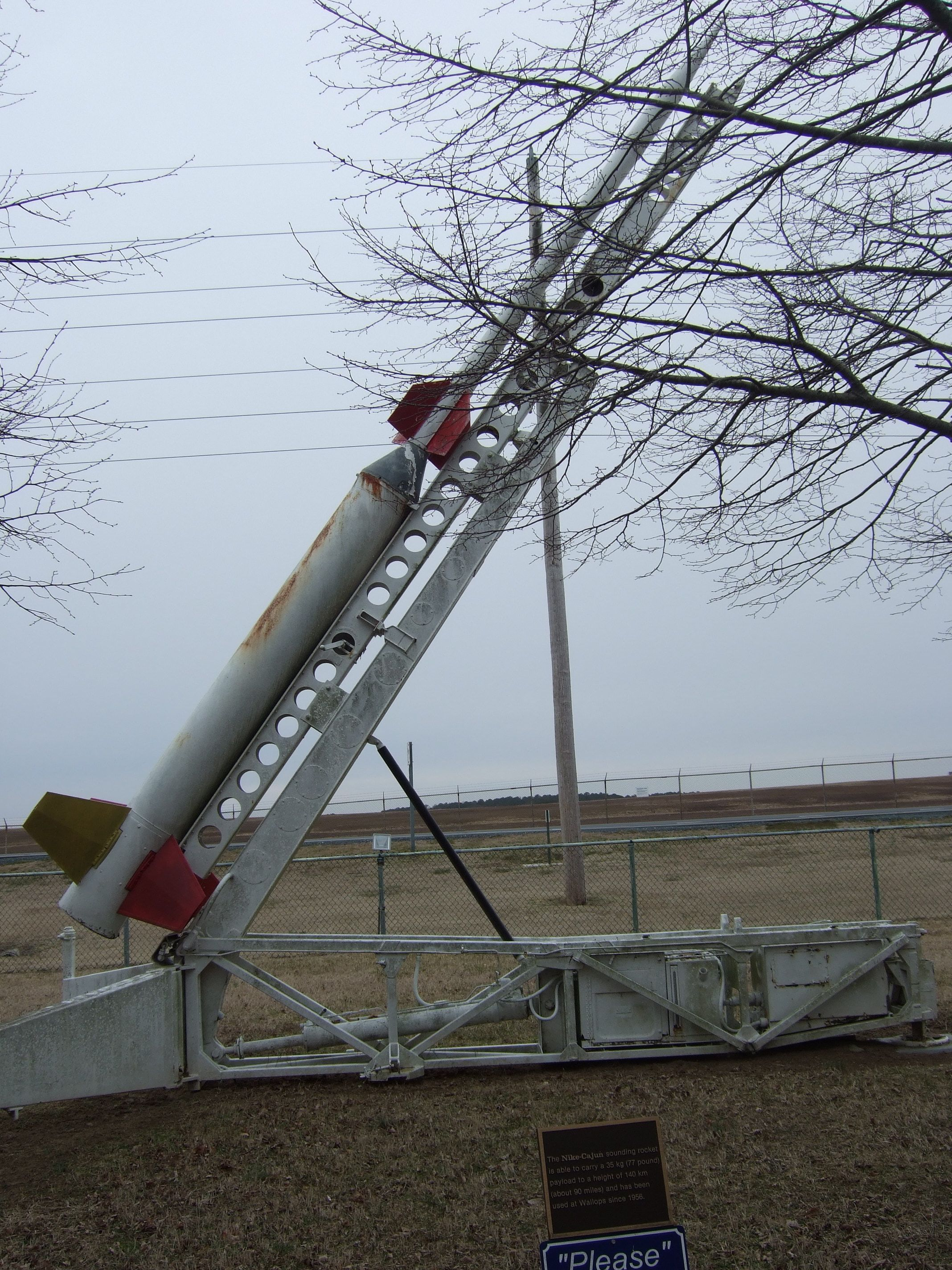
Nike-Cajun sounding rocket

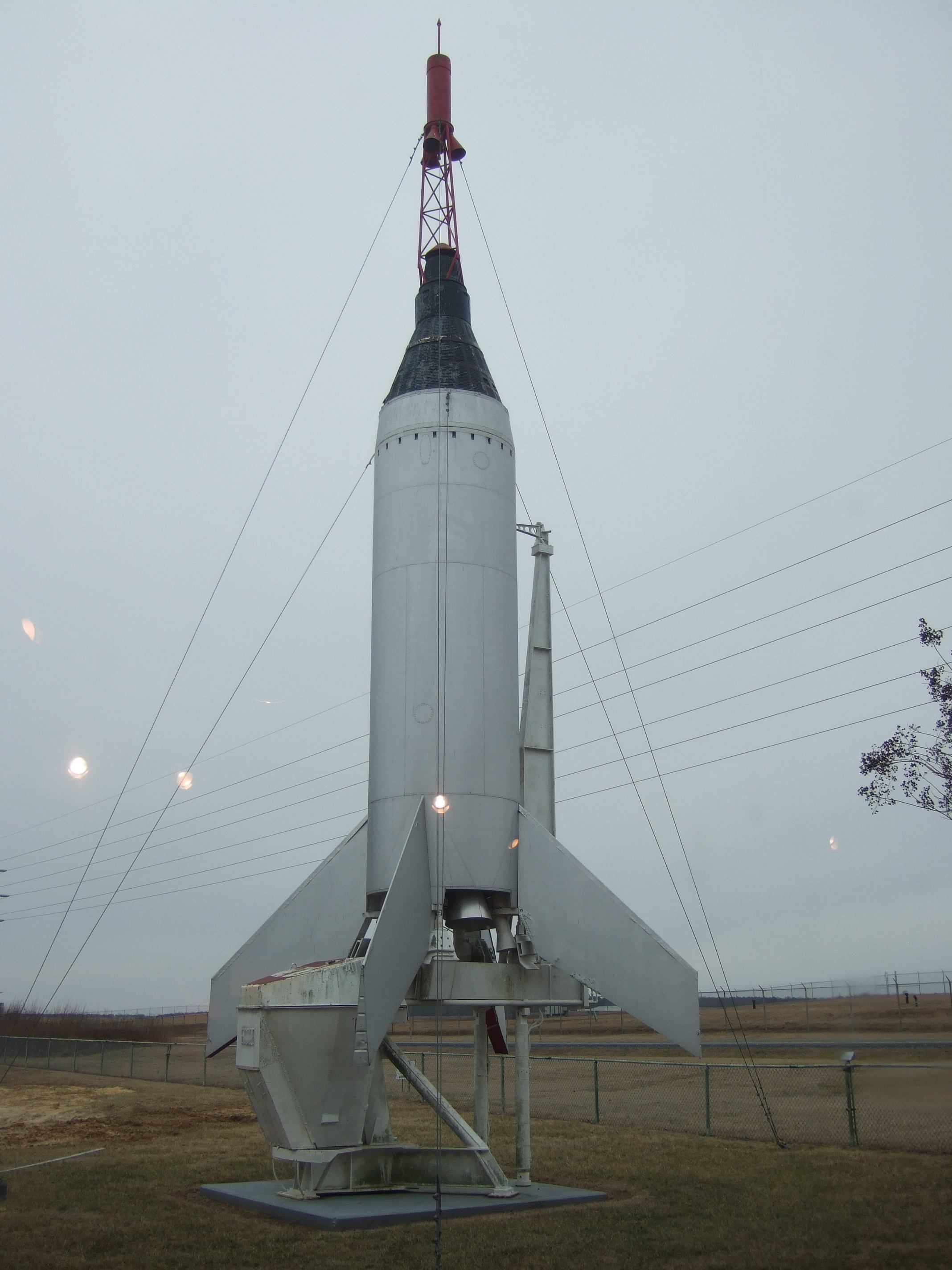
Little Joe, to test Mercury spacecraft

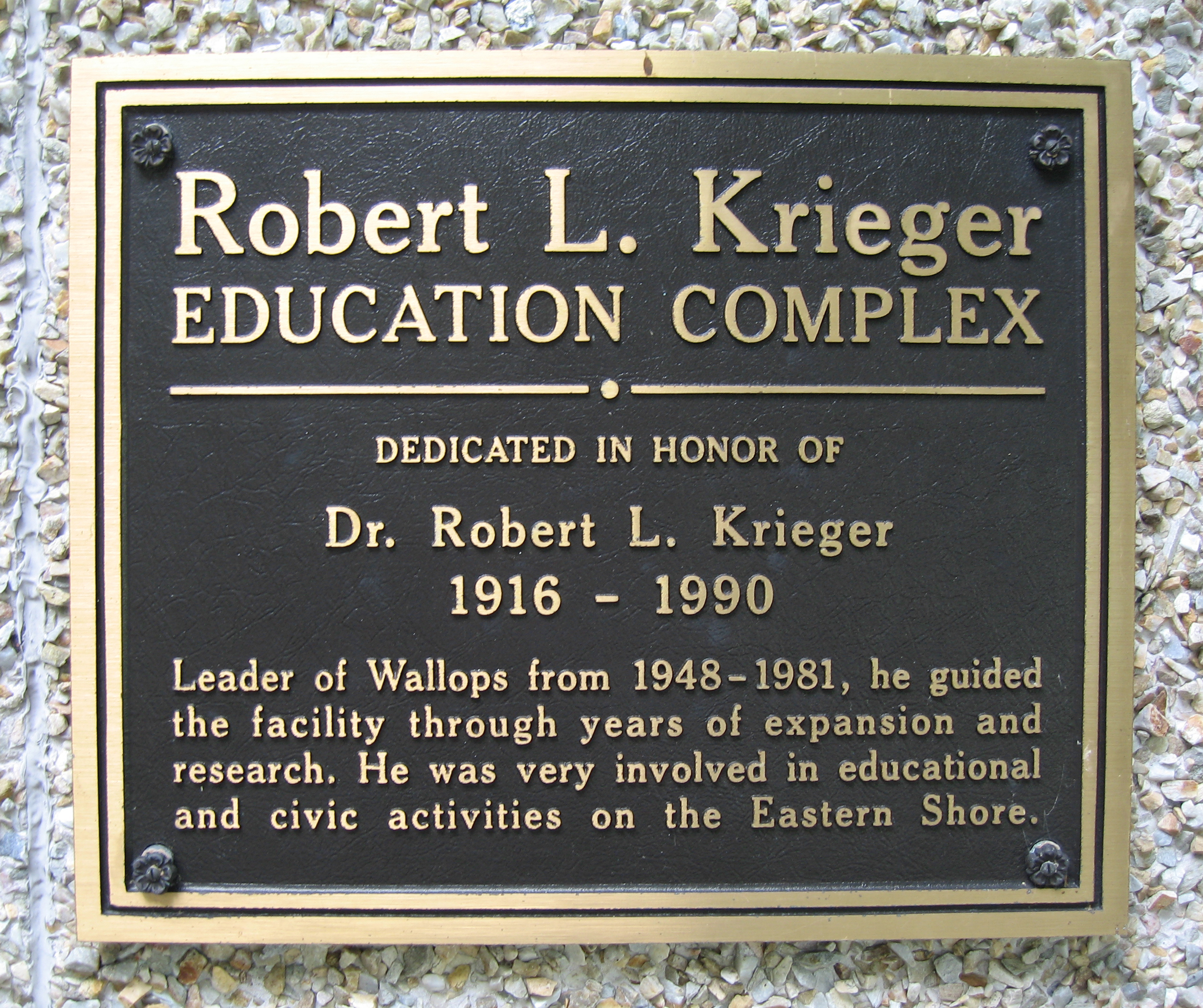
Plaque on Robert L. Kreiger Visitor Center Building

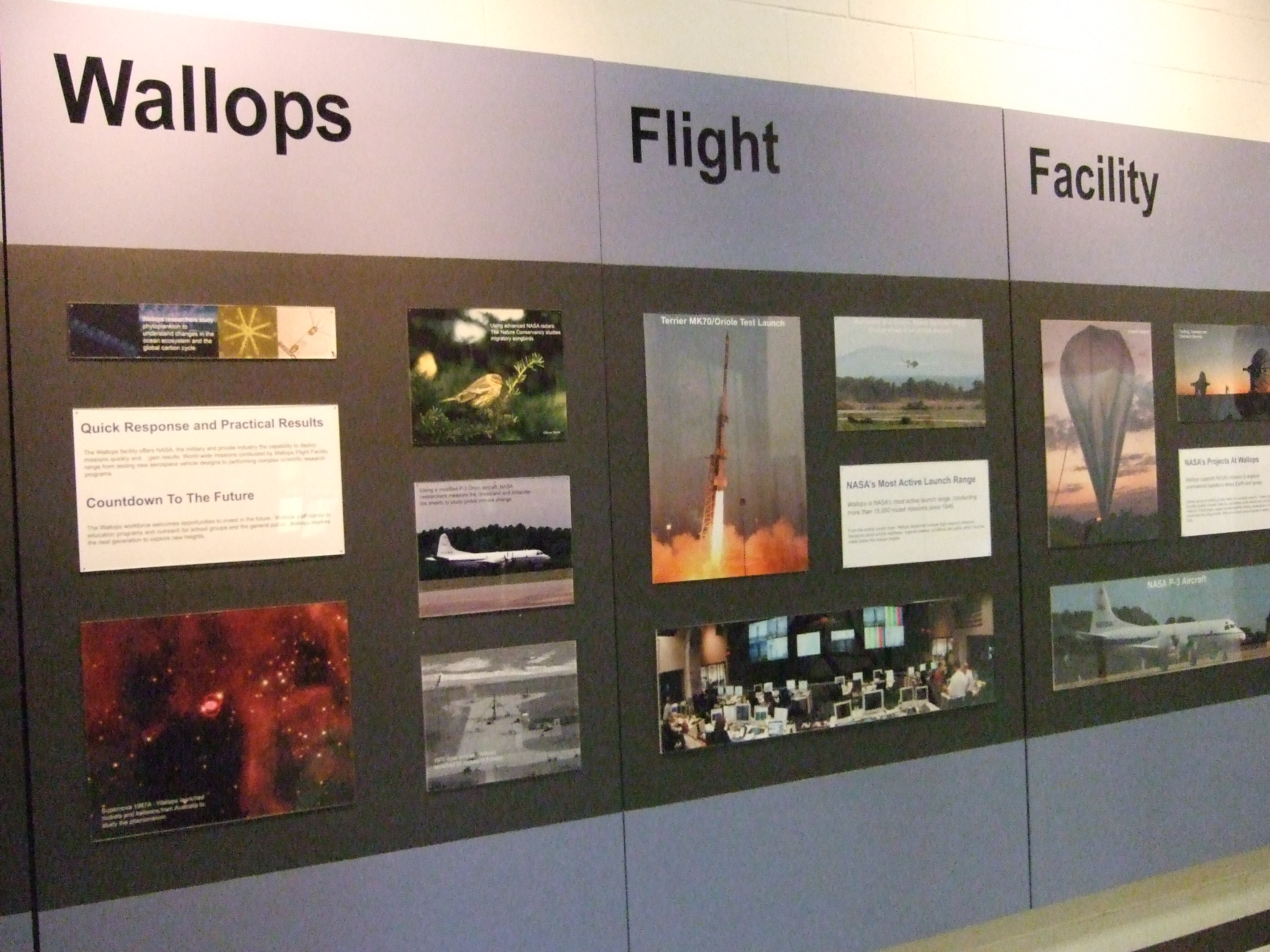
One of the Education Complex displays in Robert L. Kreiger Education Complex

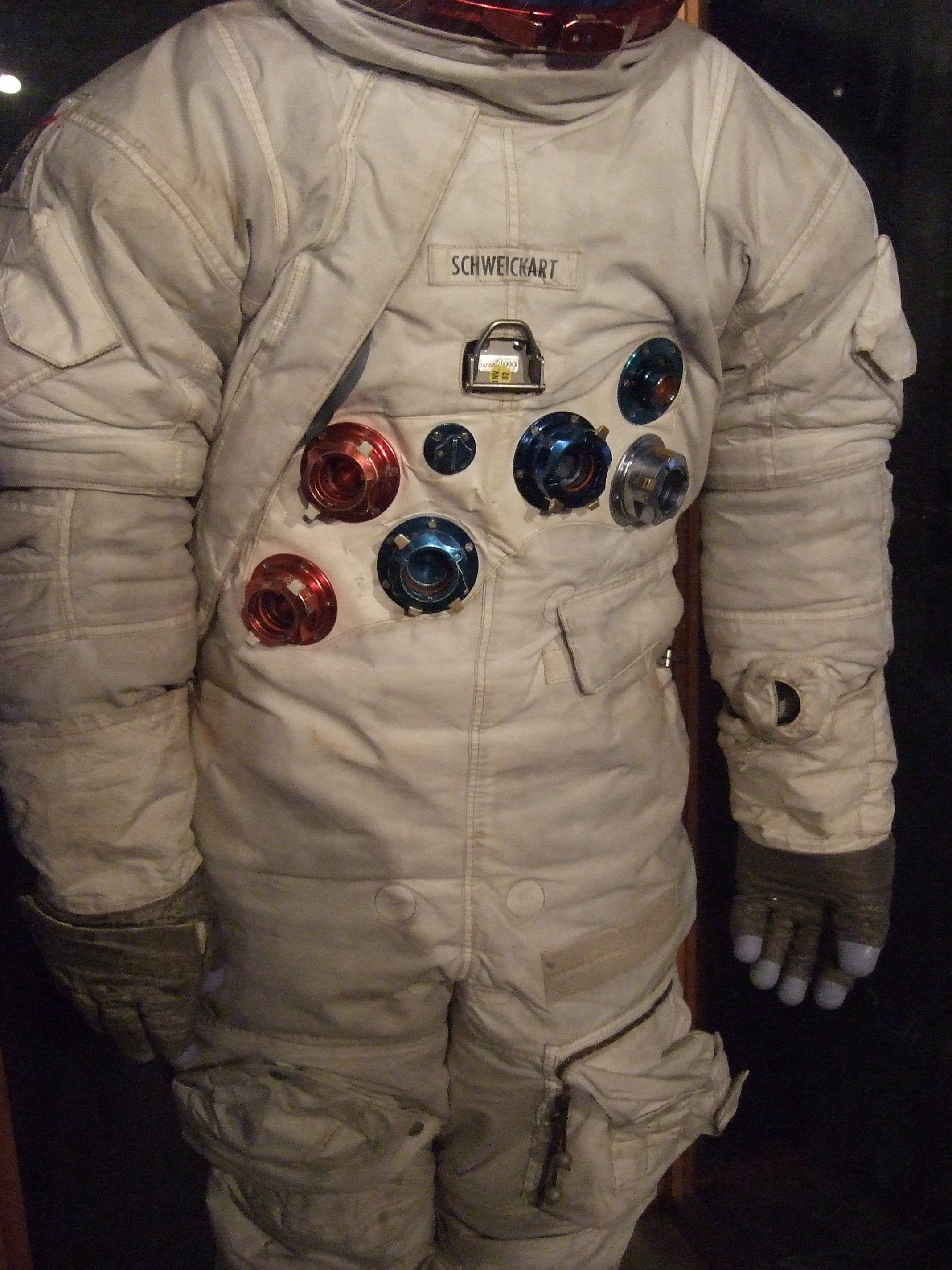
Training spacesuit for Apollo 9 astronaut Rusty Schweickart

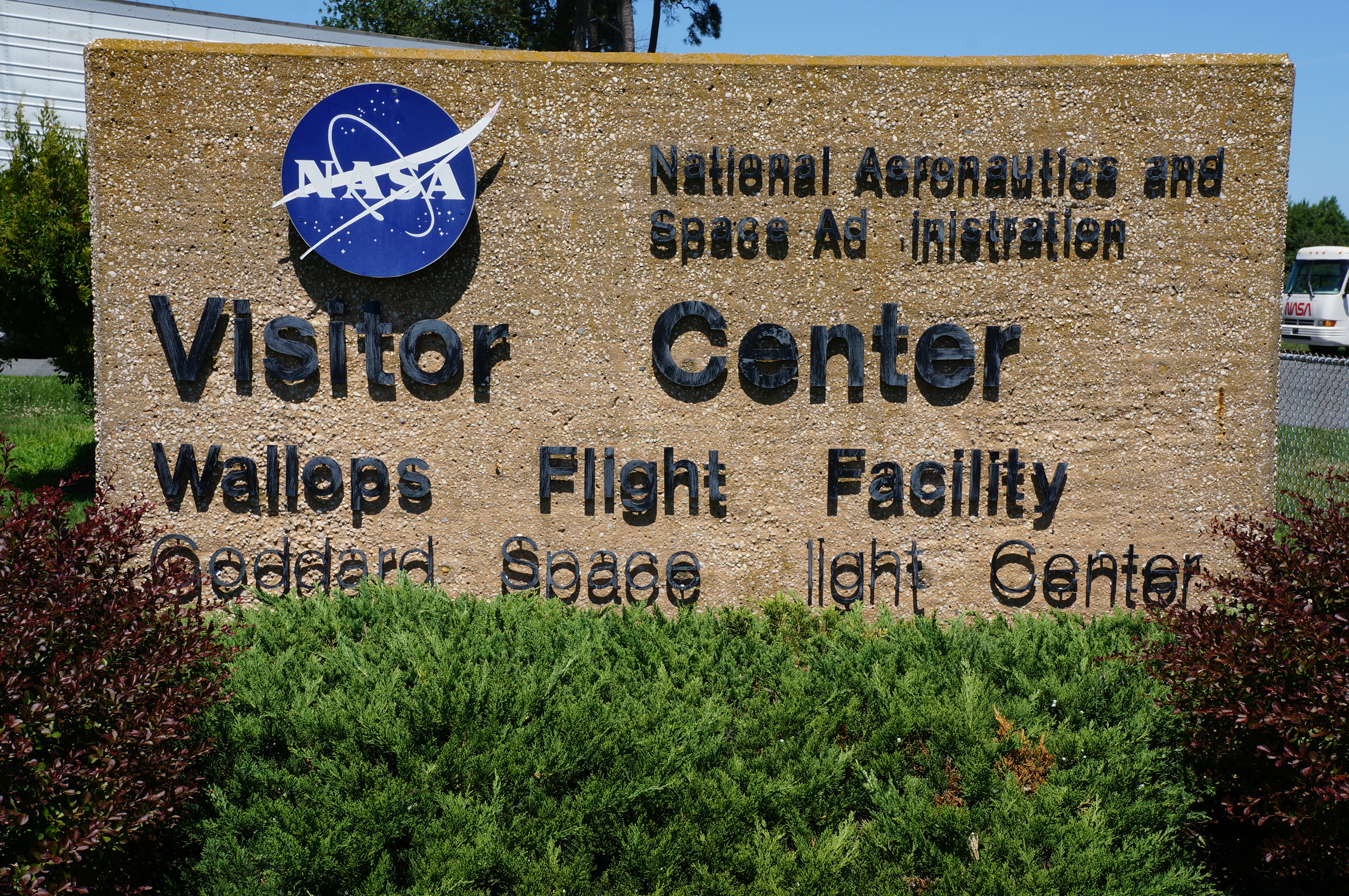
Main sign at the NASA Visitor Center (Wallops Flight Facility)

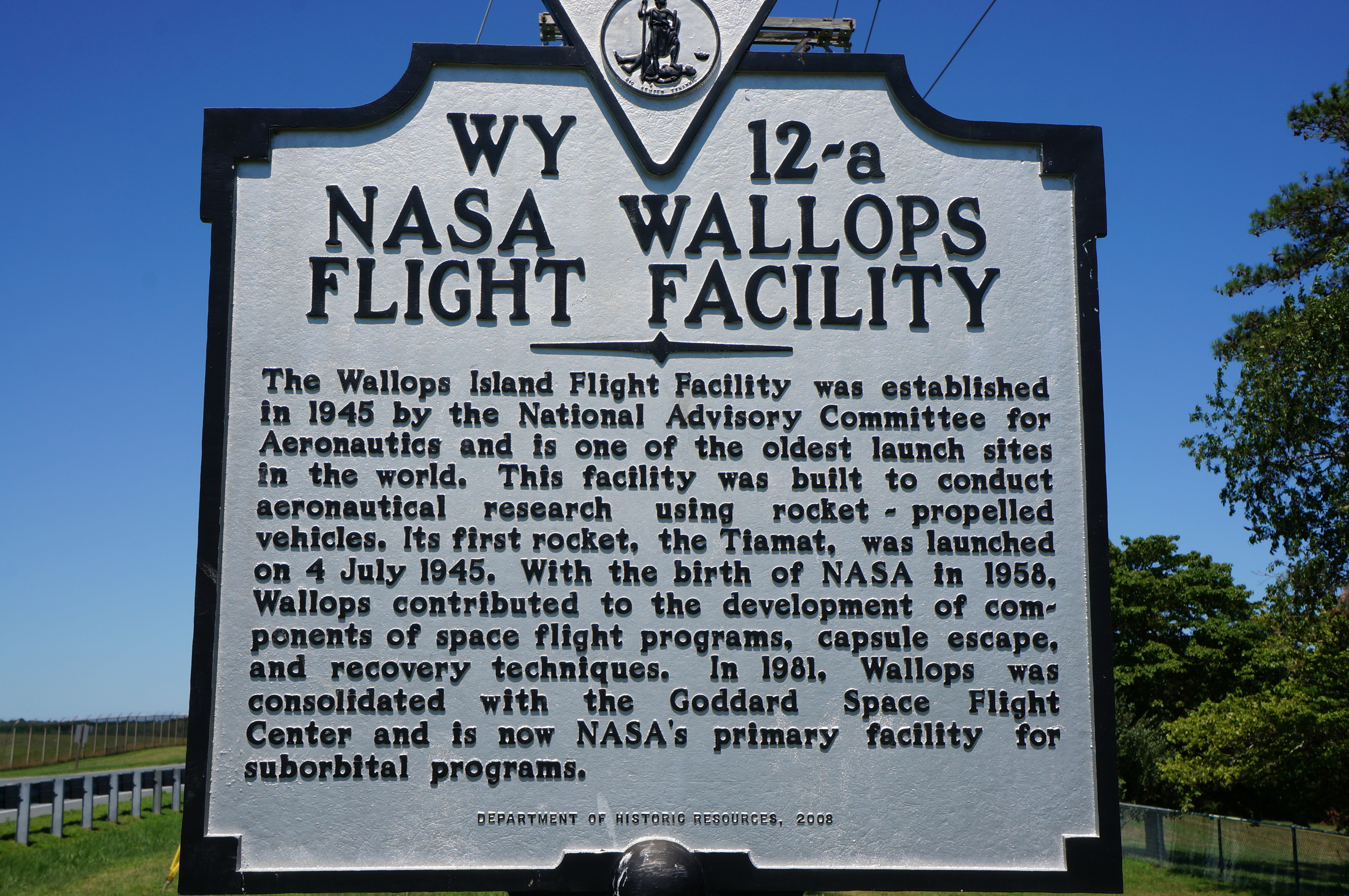
Historic sign at the NASA Visitor Center (Wallops Flight Facility)

== See also ==
- List of NASA Visitor Centers
