= List of NASA visitor centers =

NASA Visitor Centers
- Purpose: Provide joint marketing and facilitate communications between official NASA Visitor Centers
- Professional title: NASA Visitor Centers
- Members: Limited to official NASA Visitor Centers and Space Shuttle locations
- Website: www.visitnasa.com

NASA has several visitor centers, including:

Visitor Center	NASA Center	City
NASA Ames Visitor Center	Ames Research Center	Moffett Field, California
Goddard Visitor Center	Goddard Space Flight Center	Greenbelt, Maryland
Kennedy Space Center Visitor Complex	Kennedy Space Center	Merritt Island, Florida
WFF Visitor Center	Wallops Flight Facility	Wallops Island, Virginia
U.S. Space & Rocket Center	Marshall Space Flight Center	Huntsville, Alabama
Armstrong Flight Research Center	Armstrong Flight Research Center	Edwards Air Force Base, California
Great Lakes Science Center	Glenn Research Center	Cleveland, Ohio
Jet Propulsion Laboratory	Jet Propulsion Laboratory	Pasadena, California
Space Center Houston	Lyndon B. Johnson Space Center	Houston, Texas
Infinity Science Center	John C. Stennis Space Center	Hancock County, Mississippi
Virginia Air and Space Center	Langley Research Center	Hampton, Virginia

== See also ==
- Air Force Space and Missile Museum (Cape Canaveral)
- Category:NASA visitor centers
