= Rocket garden =

Outdoor museum of rocketry

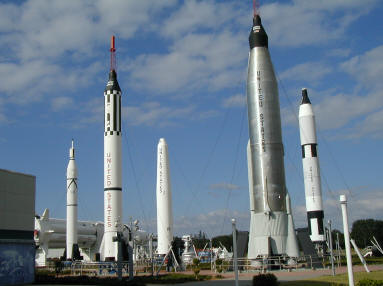
Kennedy Space Center Visitor Complex Rocket Garden in 2004.

A rocket garden or rocket park is a display of missiles, sounding rockets, or space launch vehicles, usually in an outdoor setting. The proper form of the term usually refers to the Rocket Garden at the Kennedy Space Center Visitor Complex.

Most rockets that have flown so far are at least partially expendable (in some rockets, certain stages or boosters get reused), so rockets in displays have not been flown. As in the case of the Saturn V, later planned missions were cancelled, leaving unneeded rockets for the museums. For displays of early American space hardware, such as Project Mercury and Project Gemini, surplus missiles have been painted to look like crewed space launch vehicles. Engineering test articles (such as the Space Shuttle Pathfinder stack in Huntsville) or purpose-built full-scale replicas are also displayed in rocket gardens.

== Examples ==
=== Europe ===
- Musée de l'air et de l'espace, Le Bourget, France
- Historical Technical Museum, Peenemünde, Germany

=== North America ===
- U.S. Space & Rocket Center, Huntsville, Alabama
- Air Force Space and Missile Museum, Cape Canaveral Space Force Station, Cape Canaveral, Florida
- Kennedy Space Center, Merritt Island, Florida
- Goddard Space Flight Center, Greenbelt, Maryland
- New Mexico Museum of Space History, Alamogordo, New Mexico
- National Museum of Nuclear Science & History, Albuquerque, New Mexico
- White Sands Missile Range, near Las Cruces, New Mexico
- 1964 New York World's Fairgrounds, Flushing Meadows Park, New York; now the New York Hall of Science
- National Museum of the United States Air Force, Wright-Patterson Air Force Base, Dayton, Ohio
- Fort Sill, Lawton, Oklahoma
- SpaceX Starbase, Boca Chica, Texas
- Space Center Houston, Johnson Space Center, Houston, Texas
- Thiokol, near Promontory, Utah
- Air Power Park, Hampton, Virginia
- Wallops Flight Facility Visitor Center, Wallops Island, Virginia
- National Air and Space Museum, Washington, D.C. (indoors)
- Francis E. Warren Air Force Base, Cheyenne, Wyoming

=== Oceania ===
- Woomera, South Australia

== Photos ==
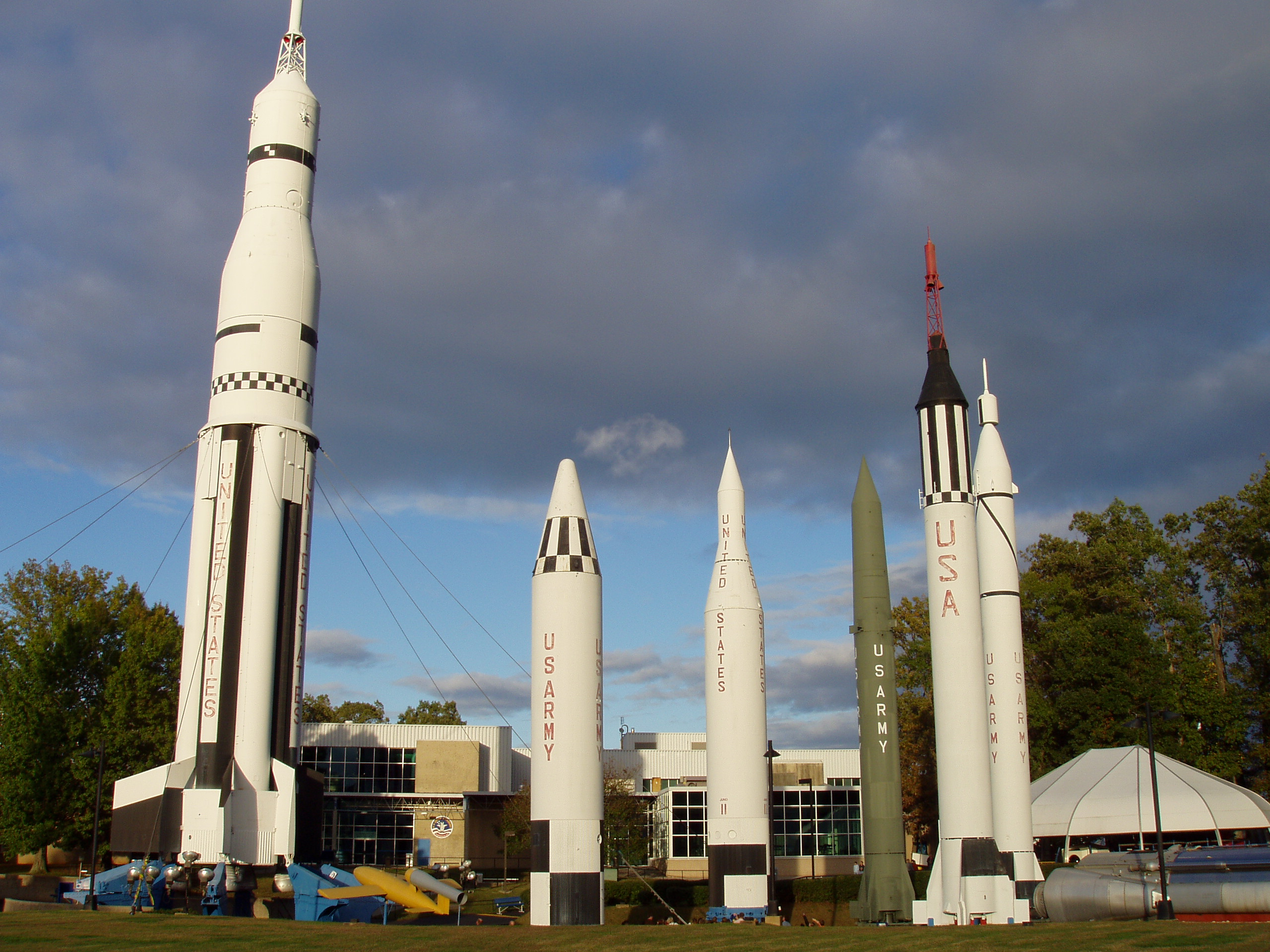
U.S. rockets at the Space & Rocket Center. Huntsville, Alabama.

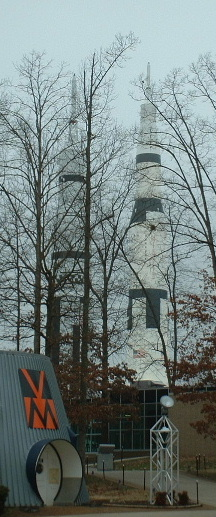
Authentic Saturn I (left) and replica Saturn V (right) at Huntsville, Alabama.

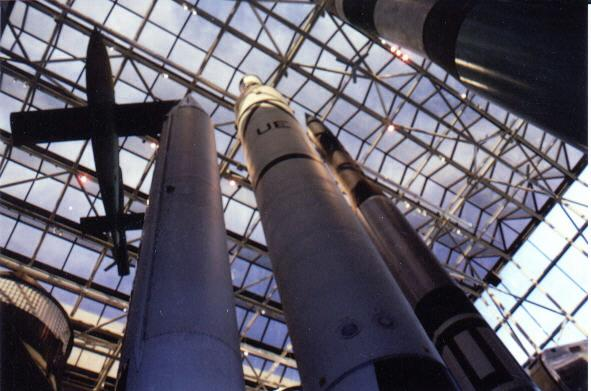
Indoor rocket garden, National Air and Space Museum.

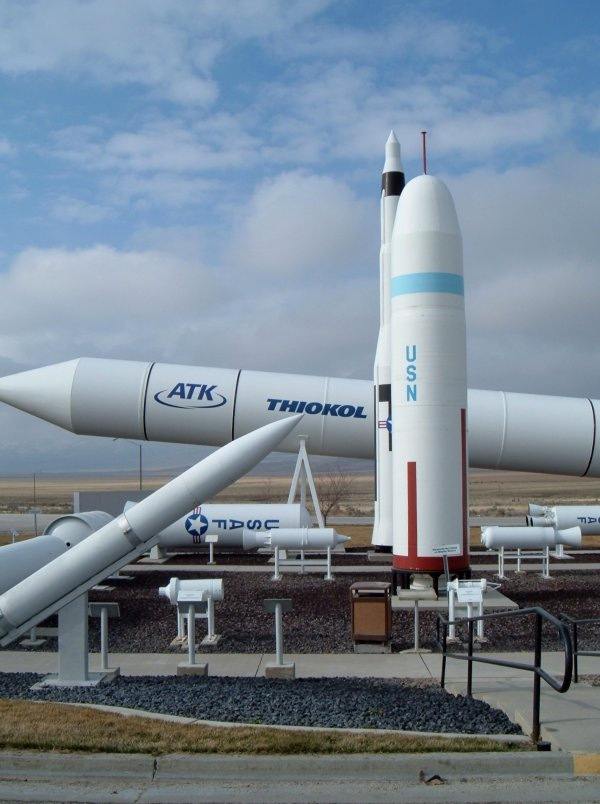
Thiokol rocket garden, Utah.

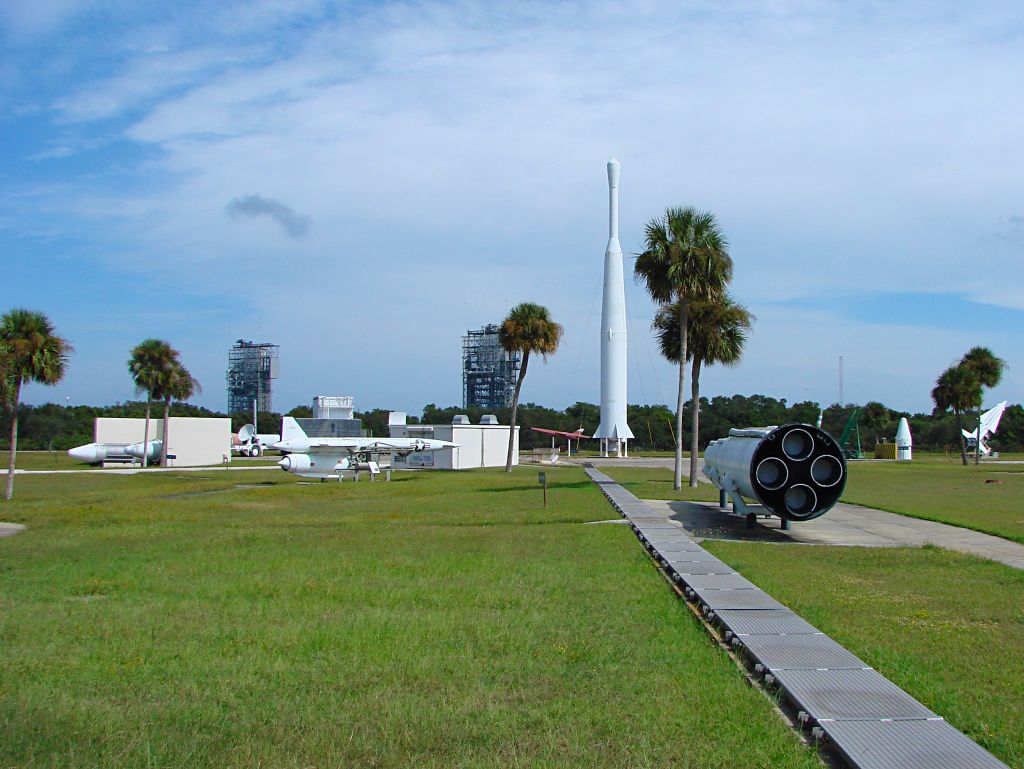
Air Force Space and Missile Museum, Cape Canaveral Space Force Station, Florida.

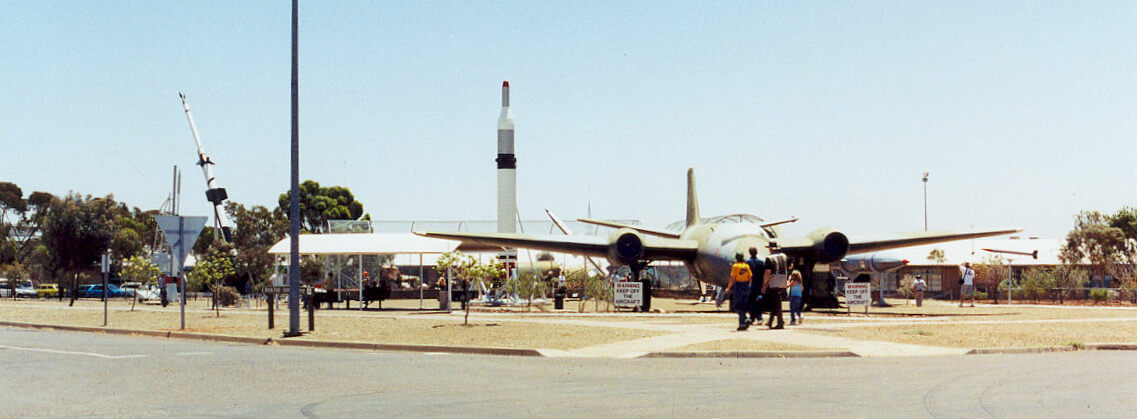
Woomera Missile Park, Woomera, South Australia

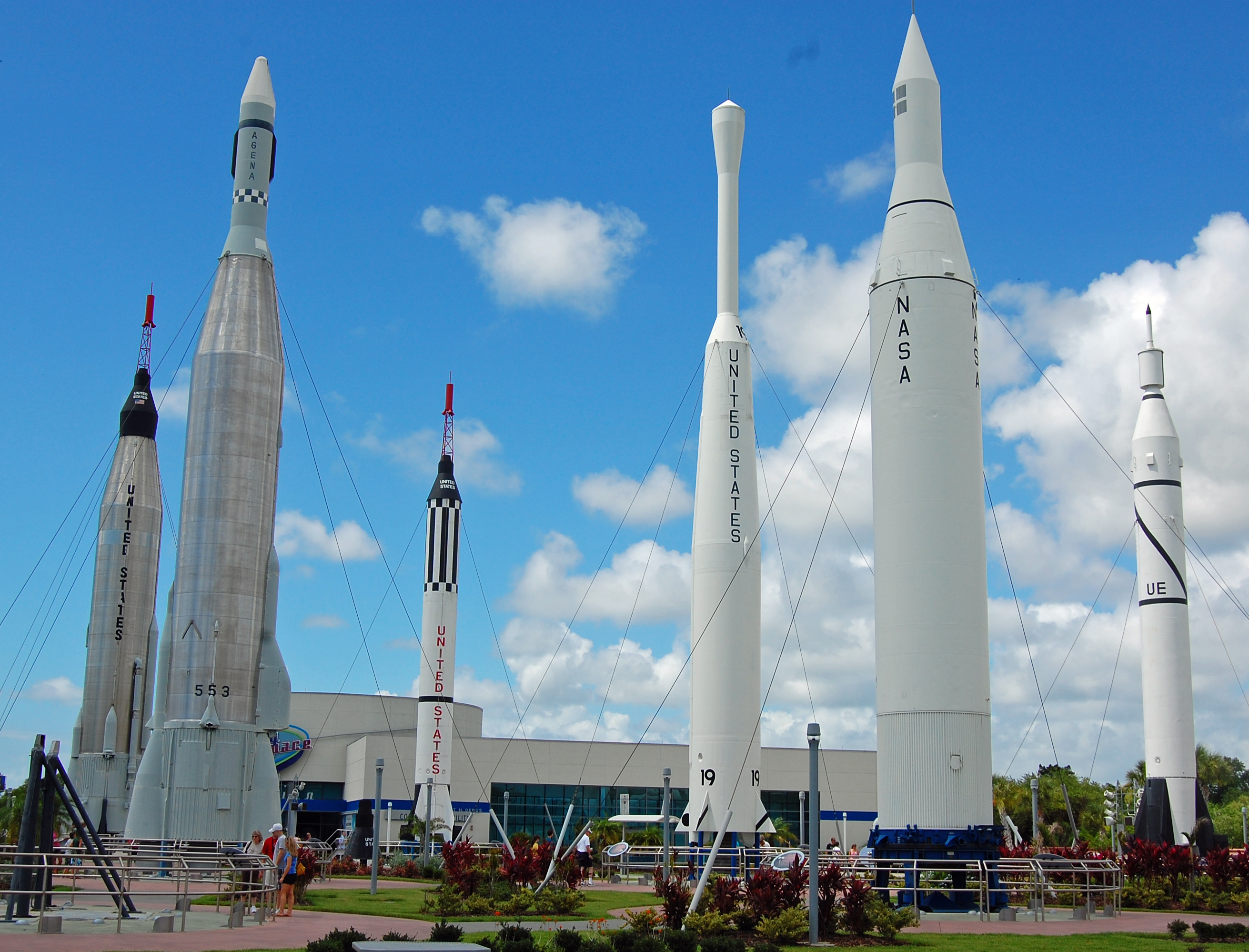
KSCenter Visitors Center rocket garden

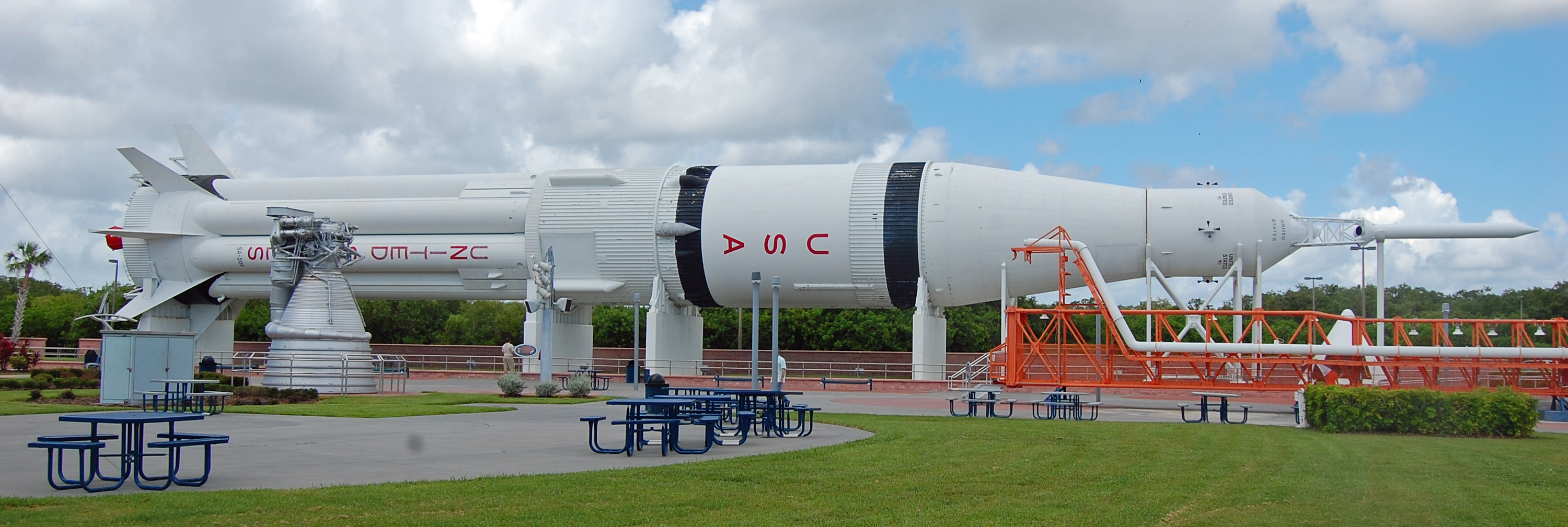
KSC Saturn IB & F1 engine

== See also ==
- Kennedy Space Center Visitor Complex § Rocket Garden
- Rock garden, likely the inspiration of the term "rocket garden"
- Sculpture garden, another example of a "garden" displaying nonliving, humanmade objects
