= NASA Gift Shop in Silicon Valley =

Visitor center in California, United States

Coordinates: 37°24′31″N 122°3′52″W

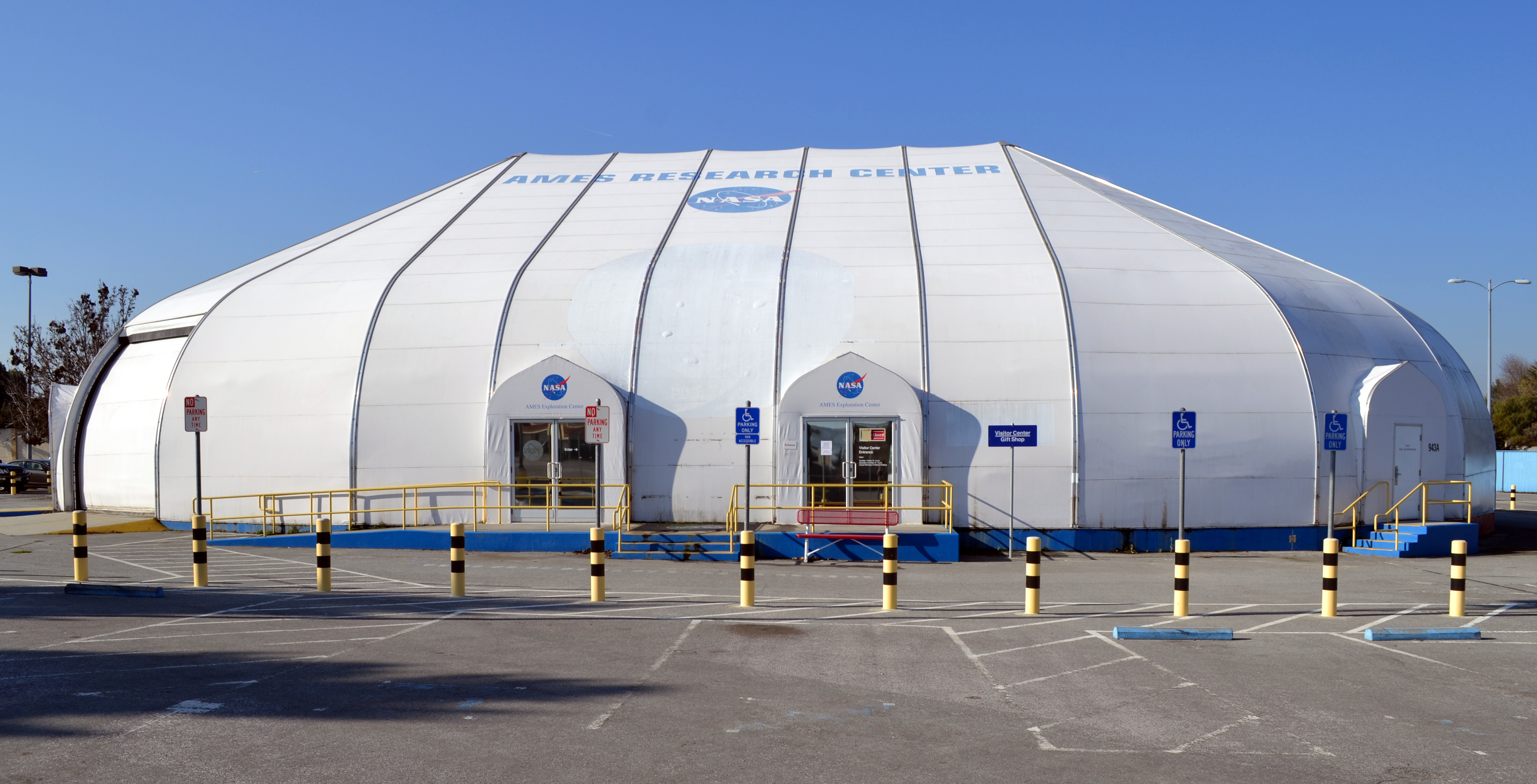
NASA Ames Exploration Center

The NASA Ames Visitor Center is a visitor center at the entrance of NASA's Ames Research Center in Moffett Field, California. The center has the following exhibits:

- The Mercury-Redstone 1A capsule, launched in 1960 in a suborbital flight, which achieved an altitude of 130.7 miles.
- A high-resolution immersive theater with a 14-foot tall and 36-foot wide screen. The theater sometimes shows movies with footage from NASA's explorations of Mars and the planets, and about the contributions of the scientists at the NASA Ames Research Center.
- A model of the SOFIA aircraft, designed for infrared astronomy observations in the stratosphere.
- A large globe of the planet Mars.

The gift shop sells space and NASA-related memorabilia. The hours are Monday to Friday, 10 AM to 6 PM, and 10 AM to 5 PM on weekends. It is closed for Federal Holidays.

== Gallery ==
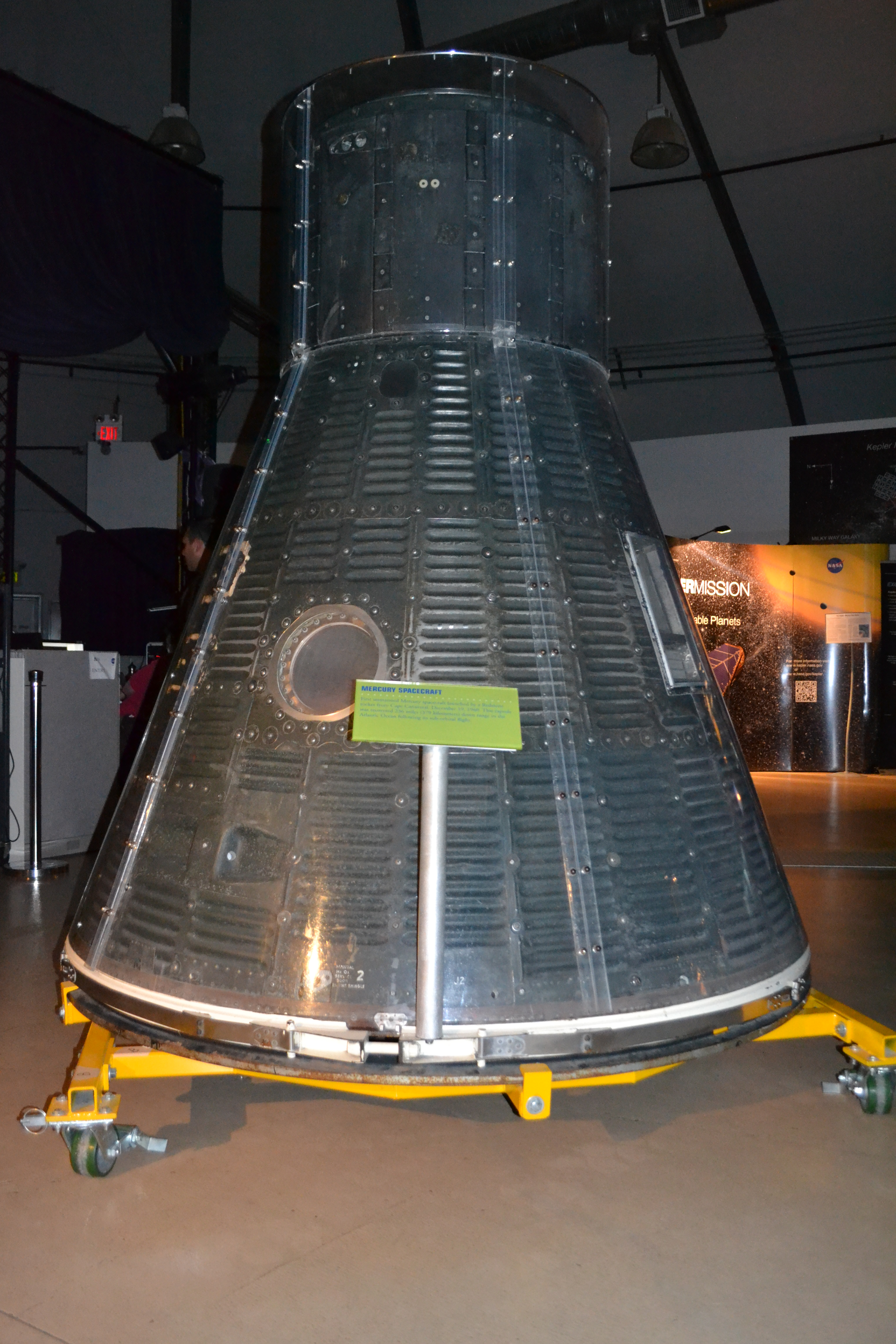
The Mercury-Redstone 1A capsule

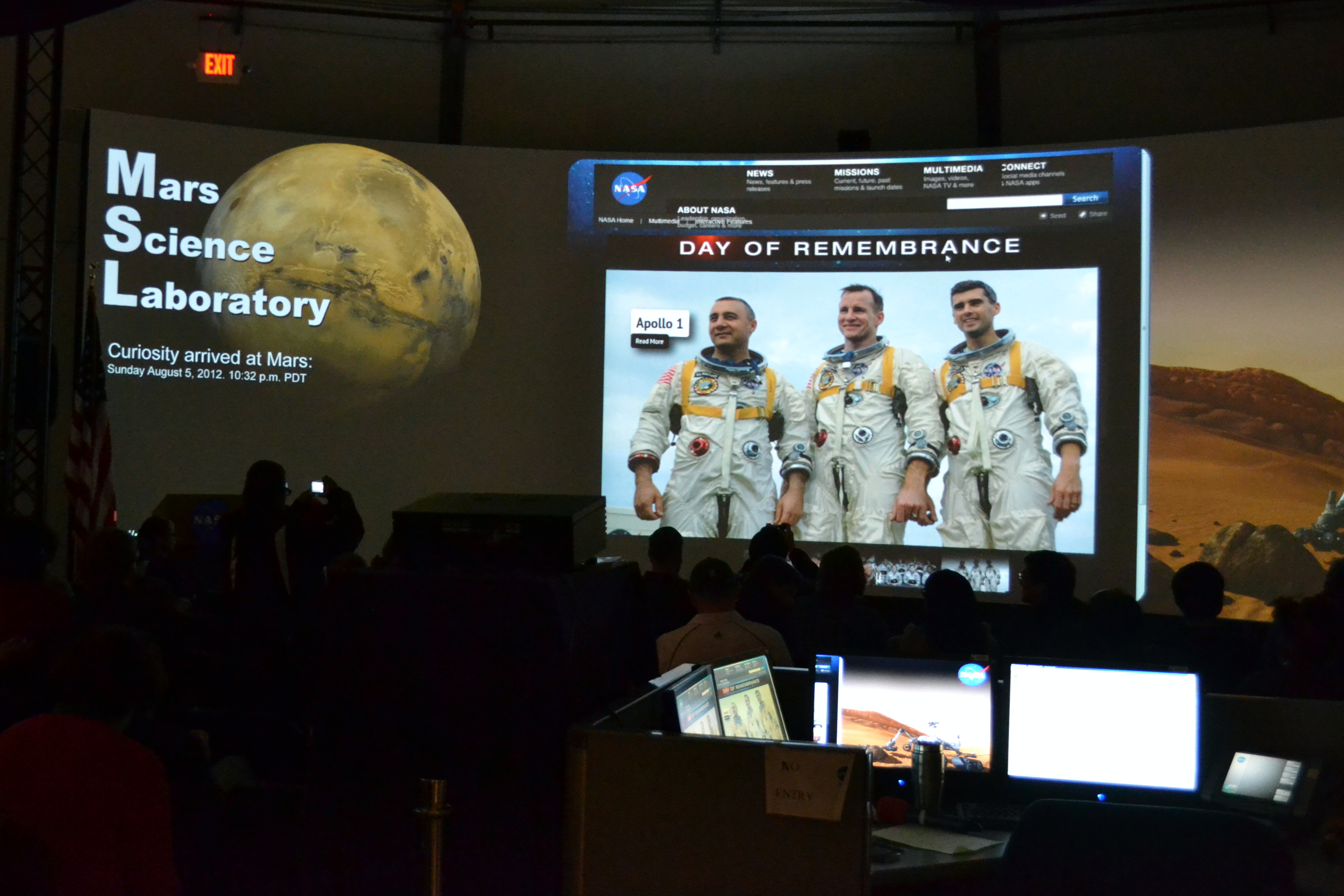
Immersive theater

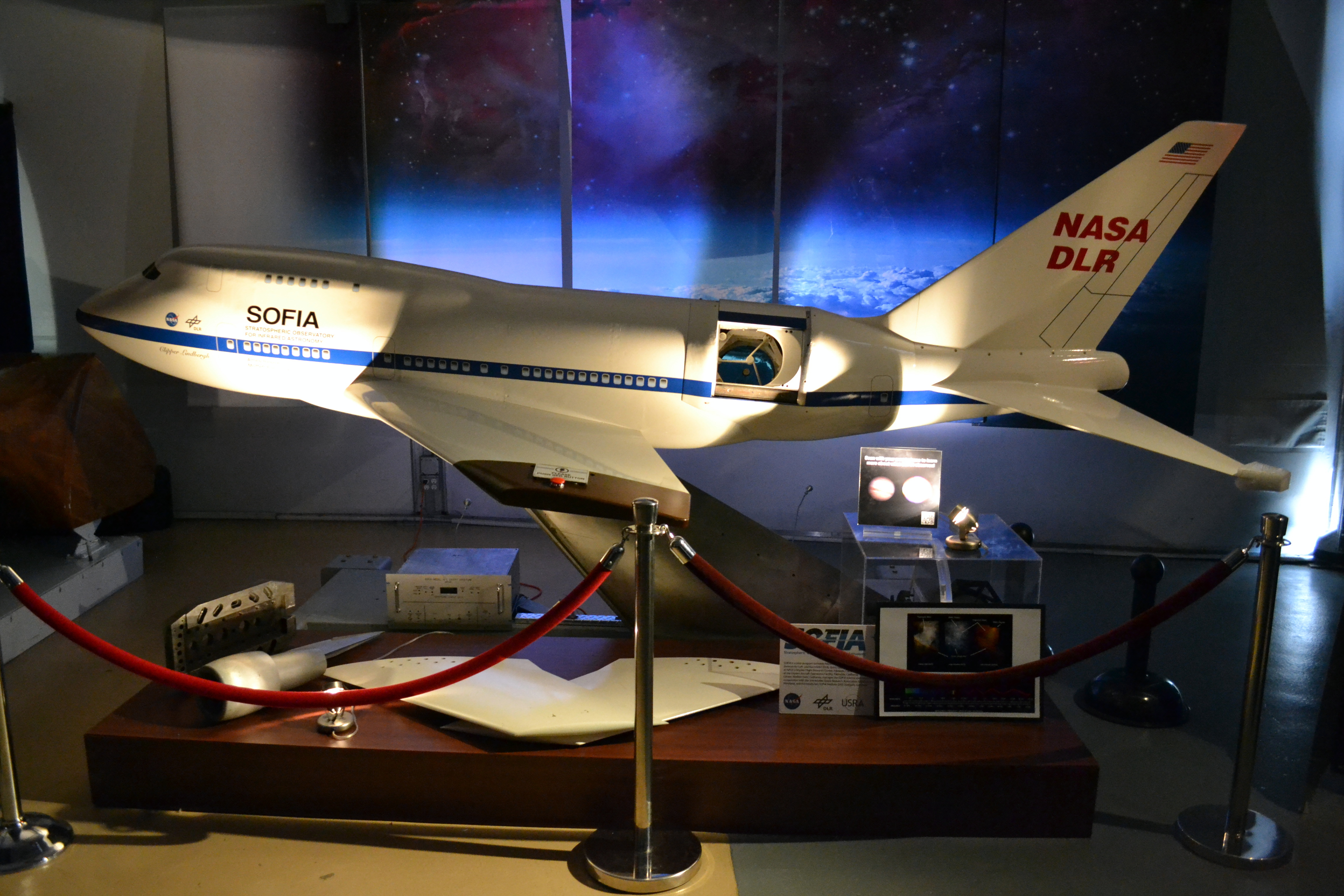
SOFIA aircraft model
