= November 1959 =

Month of 1959

<<	November 1959					>>
Su	Mo	Tu	We	Th	Fr	Sa
1	2	3	4	5	6	7
8	9	10	11	12	13	14
15	16	17	18	19	20	21
22	23	24	25	26	27	28
29	30

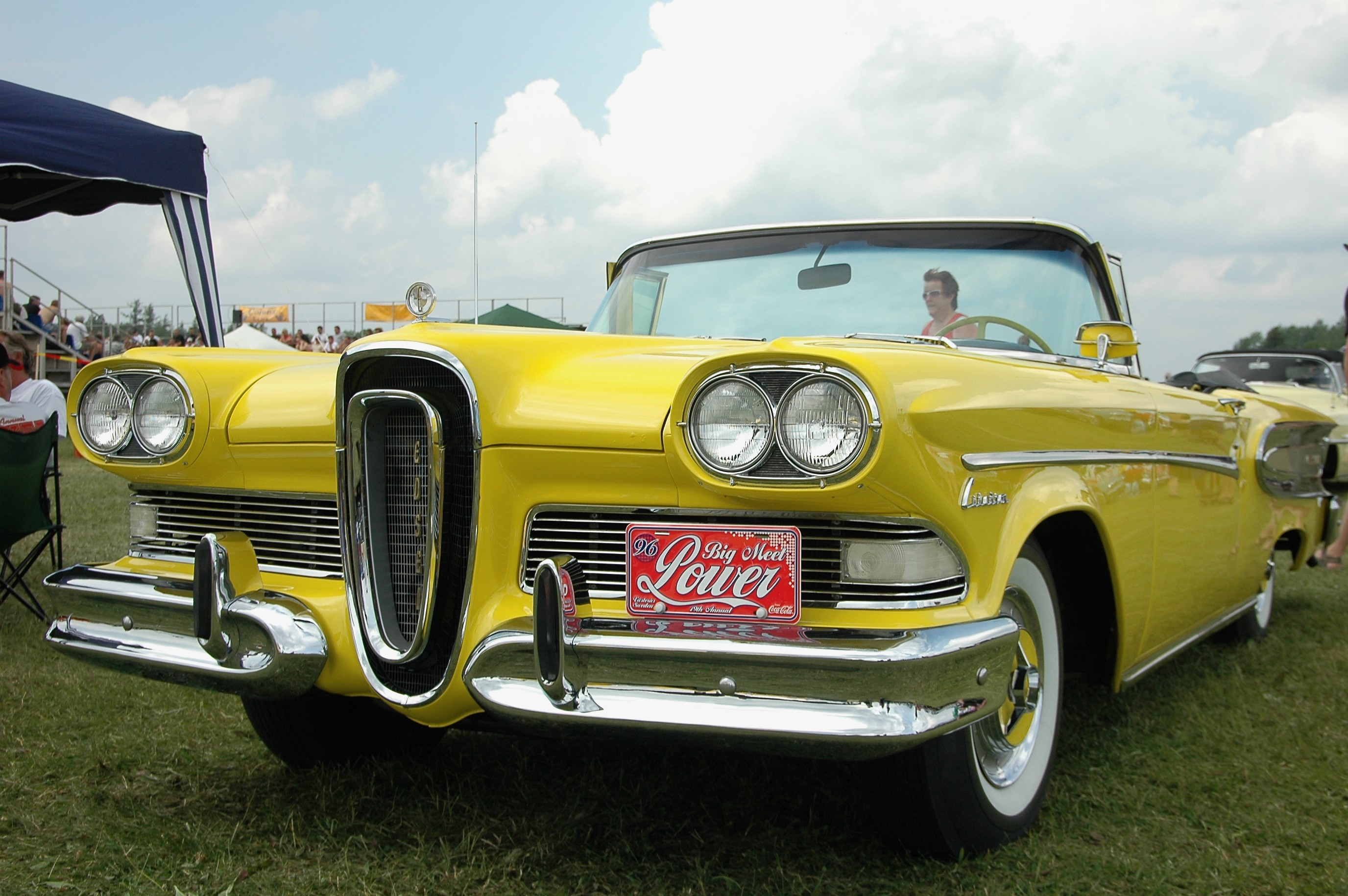
November 19, 1959: Ford stops manufacturing Edsels

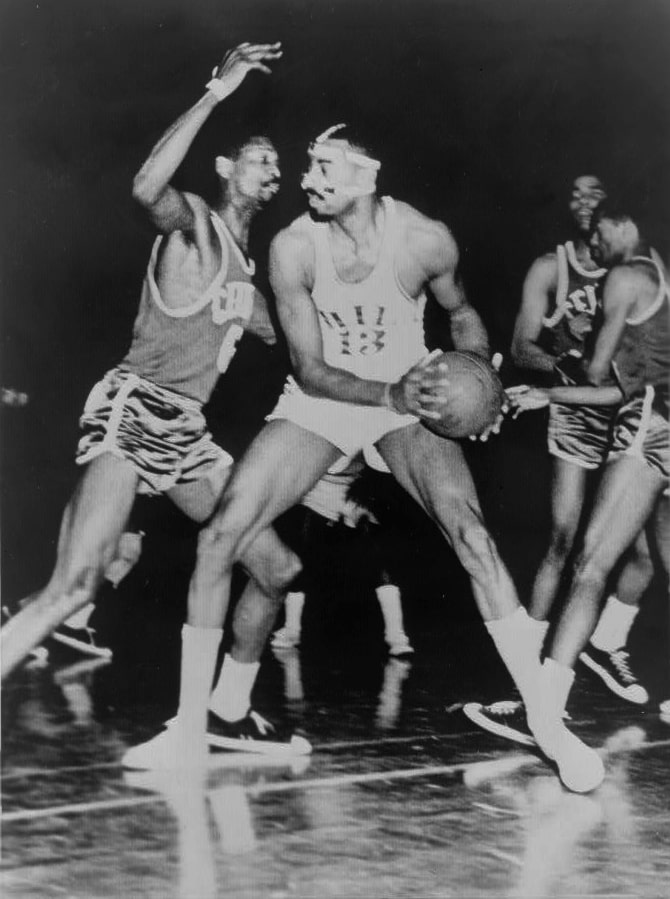
November 17, 1959: Russell and Chamberlain begin rivalry

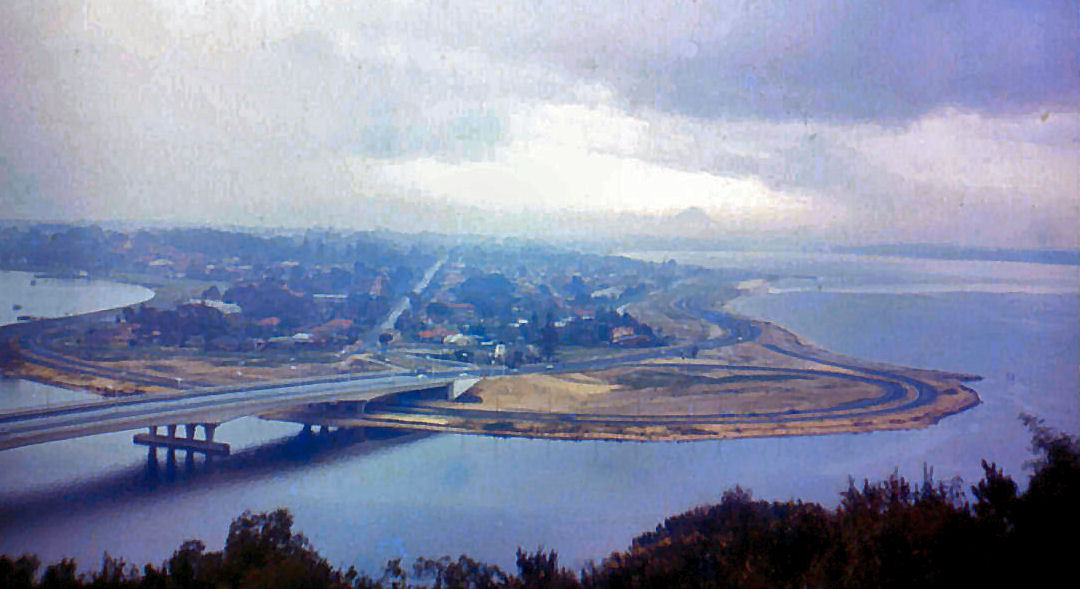
November 13, 1959: 1,301 foot long Narrows Bridge opens

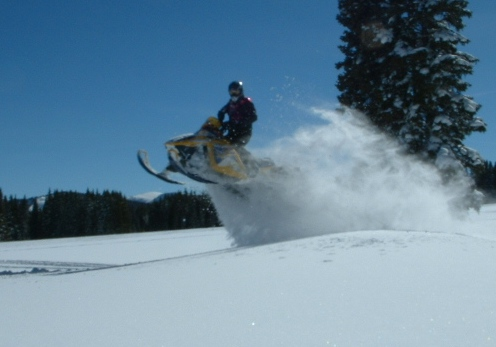
November 9, 1959: Ski-doo snowmobile introduced

The following events occurred in November 1959:

== November 1, 1959 (Sunday) ==
- In Rwanda, violence between the Hutu and Tutsi people was triggered by an attack upon Hutu activist Dominique Mbonyumutwa. Over the next two weeks 300 people, mostly Tutsi, were killed, in what was known as the wind of destruction.
- John Howard Griffin, a white writer from Mansfield, Texas, began the process of making himself look black in order to research his classic book, Black Like Me.

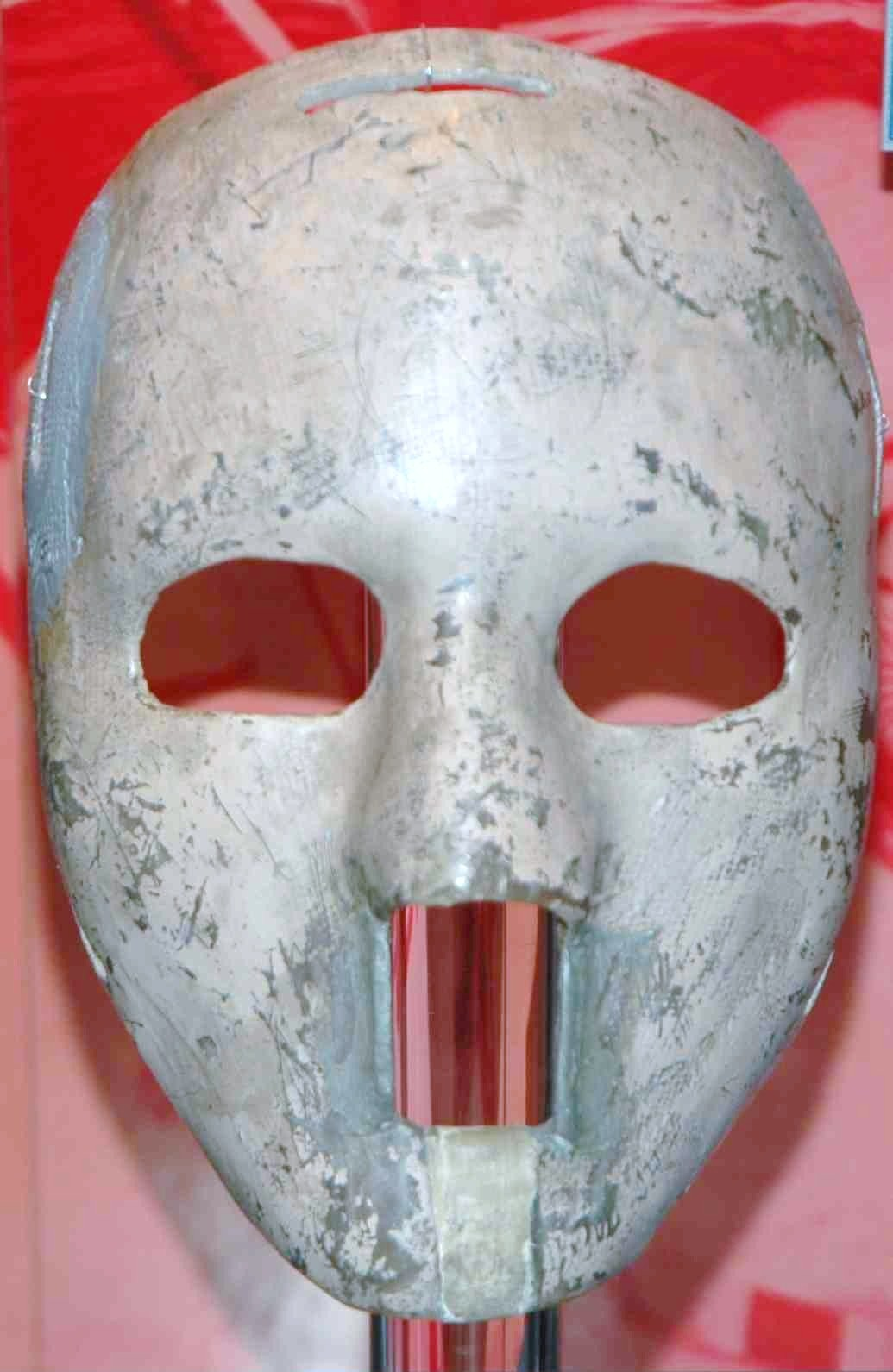
Plante's mask

- Jacques Plante of the Montreal Canadiens became the first NHL goalie in modern times to wear a face mask, donning it after a shot from Andy Bathgate (New York Rangers) struck him in the face. The Canadiens won 3–1. Soon, all goalies were wearing masks.

== November 2, 1959 (Monday) ==
- Charles Van Doren, famous for being the all-time winner on the TV game show Twenty One, admitted in a hearing in Congress that he had been supplied the answers in advance.
- Born: Saïd Aouita, Moroccan distance runner, 1987 world champion in the 5000 meter race and 1984 Olympic gold medalist; in Kenitra. Aouita at one time held the world record for fastest ever 1500 meters (1985–1992); 3000 meters (1989–1992) and 5000 meters (1985–1994)

== November 3, 1959 (Tuesday) ==
- In elections for Israel's Knesset, David Ben-Gurion's Mapai Party retained power, capturing 47 of the 120 seats, but still 13 short of a majority.
- Speaking at France's École Militaire, President Charles de Gaulle announced that France would build its own nuclear strike force, the "force de frappe", "whether we make it ourselves or buy it".
- Rioting broke out in Panama after a crowd of 2,000 students in Panama clashed with police at the American controlled Panama Canal Zone.

== November 4, 1959 (Wednesday) ==
- Six Israeli jets and four Egyptian MiG-17s clashed in a dogfight near the border between the two nations. All planes reportedly returned safely and the battle did not lead to further action.
- The government of Morocco imposed emergency measures after more than 6,700 people had been paralyzed by tainted cooking oil, including the death penalty for manufacturers who had sold the oil in Meknes during the feast of Ramadan in September and October. Peanut oil had been mixed with a jet aircraft engine rinse purchased as surplus from a United States Air Force base at Nouasseur, and the victims were poisoned by tricresyl phosphate. More than 10,000 people eventually required treatment for injuries. Five of the manufacturers were sentenced to death, but never executed.

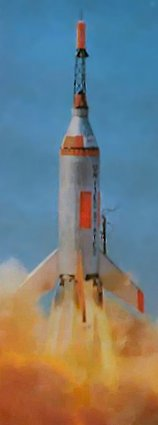
November 4, 1959: Launch of Little Joe 1A.

- Little Joe 1A was launched in a test for a planned abort under high aerodynamic load conditions. This flight was a repeat of the failed Little Joe 1 launch that had been planned for August 21, 1959. After lift-off, the pressure sensing system was to supply a signal when the intended abort dynamic pressure was reached (about 30 seconds after launch). An electrical impulse was then sent to the explosive bolts to separate the spacecraft from the launch vehicle. Up to this point, the operation went as planned, but the impulse was also designed to start the igniter in the escape motor. The igniter activated, but pressure failed to build up in the motor until a number of seconds had elapsed. Thus, the abort maneuver, the prime mission of the flight, was accomplished at a dynamic pressure that was too low. For this reason, a repeat of the test was planned. All other events from the launch through recovery occurred without incident. The flight attained an altitude of 9 statute miles, a range of 11.5 statute miles, and a speed of 2,021.6 miles per hour (3,253.4 km/h).
- Died:
  - U.S. Congressman Charles A. Boyle of Illinois, 52, was killed in an automobile accident as he returned from a long day of campaigning on behalf of Chicago Democrats.
  - U.S. Congressman Steven V. Carter of Iowa, 44, died the same day of cancer.

== November 5, 1959 (Thursday) ==
- The Mercury astronauts were fitted with pressure suits and indoctrinated as to their use at the B. F. Goodrich Company, Akron, Ohio.
- Test pilot Albert Scott Crossfield encountered trouble at 45,000 feet (14,000 m) on the third flight of the North American X-15 rocket plane and was unable to jettison his fuel because of a steep glide. The plane buckled on a hard landing on a dry lake bed. By chance, the split occurred between the cabin and the fuel tanks, and the fuel did not ignite.
- Born: Bryan Adams, Canadian pop singer, in Kingston, Ontario

== November 6, 1959 (Friday) ==
- In Boston, Dr. Bernard Lown was inspired to create the direct current heart defibrillator after using 400 volts of electricity to restore the heart rhythm of a patient, known to history only as "Mr. C___".
- Died: Jose P. Laurel, 68, President of the Philippines during Japanese occupation; Laurel was installed as the leader of the Japanese puppet-state, the Second Philippine Republic, from 1943 to 1946 and later received amnesty for collaboration with the enemy

== November 7, 1959 (Saturday) ==
- The U.S. Supreme Court upheld the constitutionality of the Taft-Hartley Act, and ordered 500,000 striking steelworkers to return to work for the next 80 days. In an 8–1 decision, Justice Douglas dissenting, the Court declared that the strike "imperils the national safety".
- After his troops had control of most of the disputed Ladakh border region with India, China's Premier Zhou Enlai proposed that both sides withdraw their troops. When the Sino-Indian War was fought in 1962, China insisted on the border being based on the lines of "actual control" of 7 November 1959.
- The rivalry between Bill Russell and Wilt Chamberlain began as Russell and the Boston Celtics defeated Chamberlain's Philadelphia Warriors, 115–106. During the 1960s, Chamberlain won more scoring titles, while Russell won more team championships. Their last meeting was in Game 7 of the 1969 NBA Finals (May 5), when Boston beat the Los Angeles Lakers 108–106.
- Born: Billy Gillispie, American basketball coach, in Abilene, Texas
- Died: Victor McLaglen, 72, Western actor

== November 8, 1959 (Sunday) ==
- Egypt and the Sudan signed a treaty governing use of the Nile River, clearing the way for construction projects there.
- Habib Bourguiba, the President of Tunisia, was unopposed in his first election bid, as were all 90 candidates for the legislative seats in the Majlis al-Nuwaab.

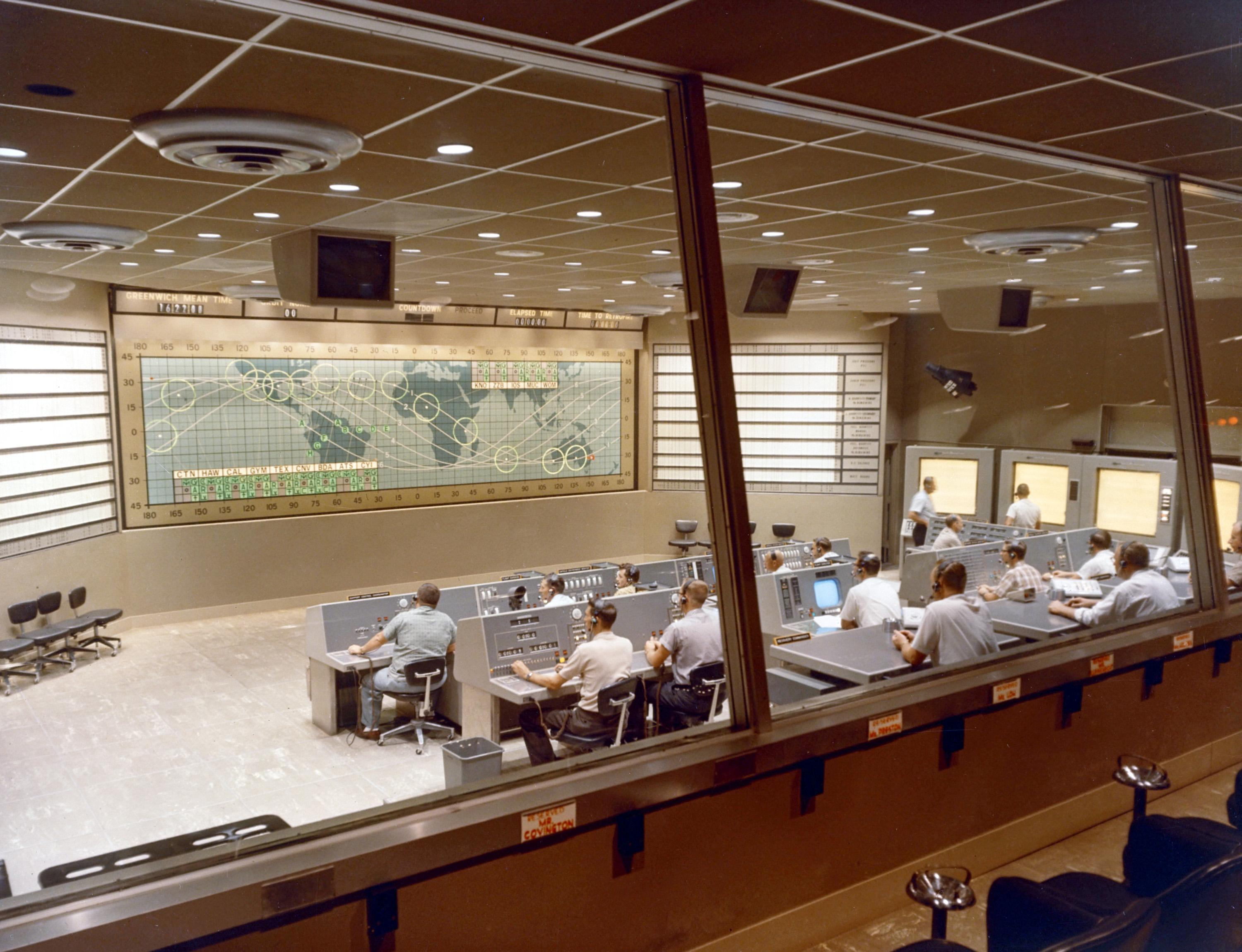
The Mercury Control Center in 1962

- Between this date and December 5, 1959, the tentative design and layout of the Mercury Control Center to be used to monitor the orbiting flight of the Mercury spacecraft were completed. The control center would have trend charts to indicate the astronaut's condition and world map displays to keep continuous track of the Mercury spacecraft.
- Elgin Baylor broke the NBA scoring record with 64 points in the Minneapolis Lakers' 136–115 win over the visiting Boston Celtics.
- Born:
  - Selçuk Yula, Turkish footballer, in Ankara (d. 2013)
- Died:
  - Frank S. Land, 69, founder of the Order of DeMolay
  - William Langer, 73, U.S. Senator from North Dakota since 1941

== November 9, 1959 (Monday) ==
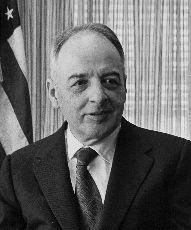
HEW Secretary Flemming

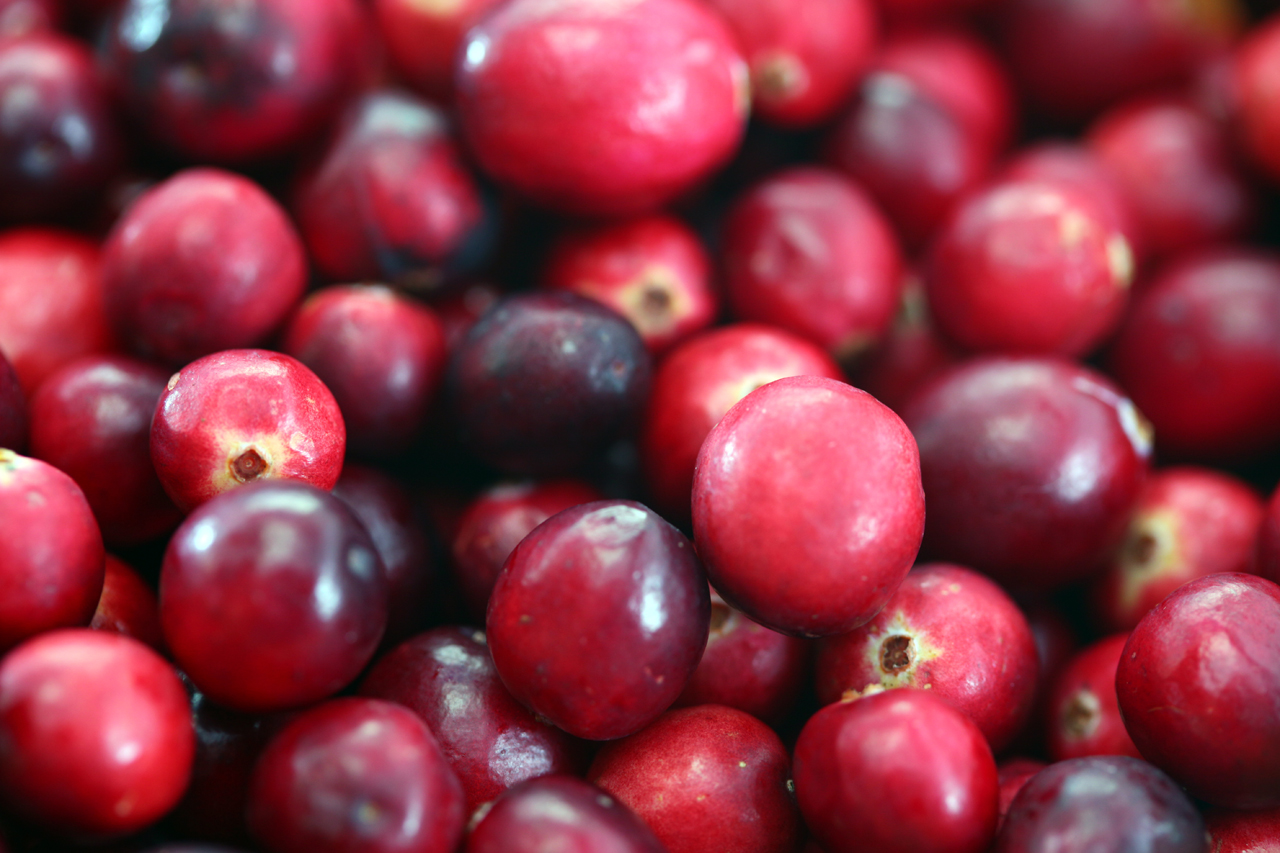
Cranberries

- Seventeen days before Thanksgiving, Arthur Flemming, the U.S. Secretary of Health, Education and Welfare, warned that some of the 1959 crop of cranberries was tainted with the carcinogen aminotriazole, and said that if a housewife did not know where the berries in a product came from, "to be on the safe side, she doesn't buy". Cranberry sales plummeted, but producers responded by finding ways to promote year-round sales of cranberry products, including cranberry juice.
- The first Ski-doo, a snowmobile with a new, light-weight (30 pound) engine, was manufactured in Valcourt, Quebec, one of 250 made on the first day of production. The lighter engine made snowmobiling more practical, and within a decade, more than 200,000 Ski-doos were being sold annually in North America.
- Born:
  - Tony Slattery, British comedian and TV actor, in Stonebridge, London
  - Donnie McClurkin, American gospel singer, in Amityville, New York
  - Angela Spivey, American gospel singer, in Chicago

== November 10, 1959 (Tuesday) ==
- USS Triton, at 447 feet (136 m) in length and 5,000 tons the largest submarine to that time, joined the U.S. Navy's nuclear sub force. With two nuclear reactors, the Triton had cost $100,000,000 to build. Meanwhile, Soviet Premier Nikita Khrushchev claimed in an interview that he had told President Eisenhower in August that "your submarines are not so bad, but the speed of our atomic submarines is double yours."
- Space Task Group personnel visited McDonnell to monitor the molding of the first production-type couch for the Mercury spacecraft.
- Born:
  - Linda Cohn, the first full-time female sports anchor in the United States; in Selden, New York
  - Mackenzie Phillips, American TV actress (One Day at a Time); in Alexandria, Virginia

== November 11, 1959 (Wednesday) ==
- Werner Heyde, a psychiatrist who had guided the euthanizing of more than 100,000 handicapped persons in Nazi Germany, surrendered to police in Frankfurt after 13 years as a fugitive. As director of the Reich Association of Hospitals, Dr. Heyde had carried out "Action T4". Men, women and children who were mentally or physically handicapped were the victims of Heyde's "mercy killing" from 1939 to 1942, usually by lethal injection. Sentenced in absentia to death, Heyde had been practicing in Flensburg as "Dr. Fritz Sawade". On February 13, 1964, five days before his trial was to start, Dr. Heyde hanged himself at the prison in Butzbach.

== November 12, 1959 (Thursday) ==
- William Morrison, 1st Viscount Dunrossil was selected to become the new Governor-General of Australia. Morrison, a native of Scotland, had retired earlier in the year as Speaker of the House of Commons. Prior to his selection, it was speculated that Princess Margaret, sister to Queen Elizabeth II, would be selected as the Head of State and representative of the Crown in Australia.
- NASA Administrator T. Keith Glennan and Deputy Secretary of Defense Thomas S. Gates Jr. signed a NASA-Department of Defense agreement, relevant to the principles governing reimbursement of costs incurred by NASA or the Department of Defense in support of Project Mercury.

== November 13, 1959 (Friday) ==
- The Narrows Bridge in Perth, Australia, was opened to traffic. At the time, the 1,301-foot (397 m) structure was the largest in the world to be made of precast and prestressed concrete.

== November 14, 1959 (Saturday) ==
- Kilauea on the island of Hawaii had begun to swell in September. At 8:08 p.m., the volcano erupted, producing fires of lava up to 300 metres (980 ft) high. The fire fountains ceased by December 20.
- Born:
  - Piyapong Pue-on, Thai footballer with 100 caps and 70 goals for the Thailand national team; in Prachuap Khiri Khan
  - Paul McGann, British TV actor, in Liverpool

== November 15, 1959 (Sunday) ==
- Herbert and Bonnie Clutter, and their teenage children, Nancy and Kenyon, were murdered at their home near Holcomb, Kansas. Dick Hickock and Perry Smith would be captured in January, and hanged in 1965. The killings were immortalized in Truman Capote's 1966 book, In Cold Blood.
- Born: Robert Draper, American journalist and author, in Houston
- Died: C. T. R. Wilson, 90, Scottish physicist, inventor of the cloud chamber, for which he won the Nobel Prize in 1927

== November 16, 1959 (Monday) ==
- The Sound of Music, written by Rodgers and Hammerstein's music and lyrics, premiered on Broadway at the Lunt-Fontanne Theatre. Mary Martin starred as Maria von Trapp.
- National Airlines Flight 967, with 42 people on board, crashed into the Gulf of Mexico while en route from Tampa to New Orleans. Though an onboard bomb was suspected, the physical evidence was lost in the Gulf.
- From November 16 to 20, wearing the Mercury pressure suits, the astronauts were familiarized with the expected reentry heat pulse at the Navy Aircrew Equipment Laboratory, Philadelphia, Pennsylvania.

== November 17, 1959 (Tuesday) ==
- The London Daily Herald revealed a plot to kidnap Prince Charles, the 11-year-old heir to the British throne, from his boarding school, but most observers scoffed at the exclusive story. Beneath the banner headline "ROYAL KIDNAP QUIZ" came the story that the Northern Ireland nationalist group Fianna Uladh planned to raid the Cheam School to take Charles hostage. A spokesman for Scotland Yard opined that the story had been made up by the Herald "because we refused to give information about why security measures were increased at Cheam School". The newspaper ceased publication in 1964.
- Born: William R. Moses, American TV actor; in Los Angeles
- Died: Heitor Villa-Lobos, 72, Brazilian composer

== November 18, 1959 (Wednesday) ==
- Ben-Hur, which would go on to become the most popular film of the year and would win a record 12 Academy Awards, debuted at New York's Loews Theater in 70 mm Ultra Panavision, before nationwide and then worldwide release.
- Ornette Coleman became a sensation in the world of jazz with his East Coast debut at the "Five Spot Cafe" in New York's Greenwich Village. Described by one critic as "the only really new thing in jazz since ... the mid 40s", the alto saxophonist's style received a mixed reaction.
- Born: Jimmy Quinn, footballer and manager, in Belfast

== November 19, 1959 (Thursday) ==
- The Rocky and Bullwinkle Show was introduced. The cartoon was shown on ABC network stations at 5:30 each afternoon and was originally called Rocky and Friends, although Bullwinkle the moose soon became more popular than Rocky the flying squirrel.
- In its third unsuccessful year, the last Edsel automobile was manufactured by the Ford Motor Company, after a loss of $100,000,000 on the program. Eighteen of the 1960 Edsels were produced on the final day.
- Born: Allison Janney, American actress (The West Wing), in Dayton
- Died:
  - Edward C. Tolman, 73, American psychologist
  - Aleksandr Khinchin, 65, Soviet mathematician

== November 20, 1959 (Friday) ==
- The Declaration of the Rights of the Child, a set of ten principles introduced by the resolution, "Whereas, mankind owes to the child the best it has to give", was passed unanimously by the United Nations, as Resolution 1386 of the 14th Session.
- The Army Ballistic Missile Agency proposed the installation of an open-circuit television system in the Mercury-Redstone 2 and Mercury-Redstone 3 flights.
- Died: Roy Thomas, 85, American baseball player

== November 21, 1959 (Saturday) ==
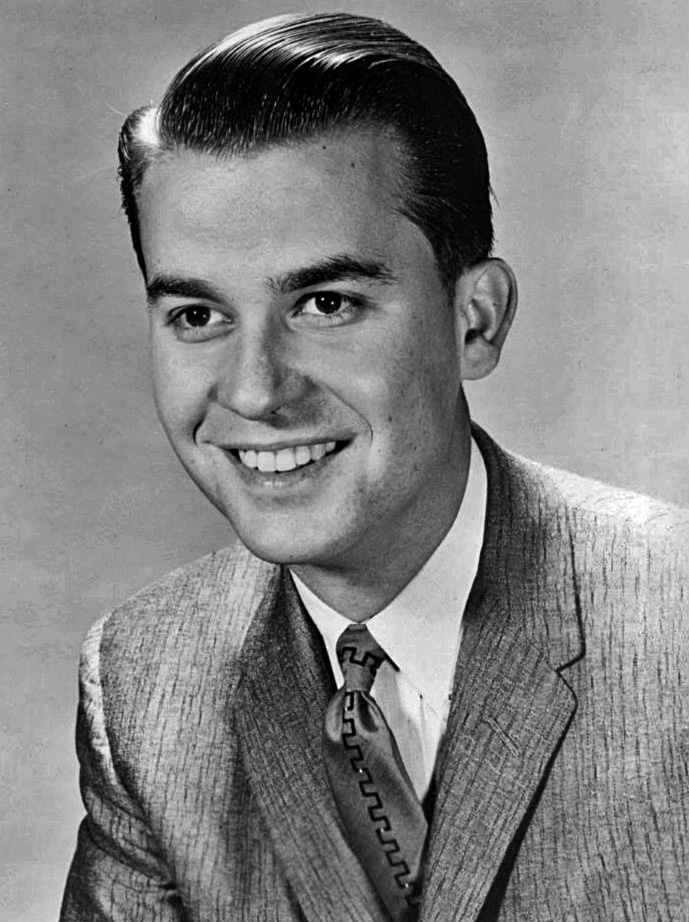
Dick Clark

- The career of nationally known disc jockey Alan Freed ended with his firing from New York's most popular rock station, WABC (AM), after he refused to sign an affidavit denying involvement in the "payola" scandal. As a DJ for WABC, Freed had promoted selected singles for undisclosed financial gain. Dick Clark, host of TV's American Bandstand, signed a similar affidavit and had divested himself of financial interests, and his career was not interrupted by the scandal.
- The first inter-league trade without waivers in major league baseball history took place when the Chicago Cubs sent Jim Marshall and Dave Hillman to the Boston Red Sox in return for Dick Gernert.
- The Phoenix Art Museum was opened in Arizona.
- Died: Max Baer, 50, American boxer who was world heavyweight champion in 1934 and 1935.

== November 22, 1959 (Sunday) ==
- The stop-motion children's program Unser Sandmännchen ("Our Sandman") premiered on East Germany's state television network Deutscher Fernsehfunk (DFF) as a 10-minute long show bedtime story. In West Germany, a different version called Sandmännchen premiered nine days later at the same time on the ARD network of stations. The West German version would stop being shown after March 31, 1989, while the East German series would continue to be shown after the reunification of Germany and continued to be seen more than 60 years later.

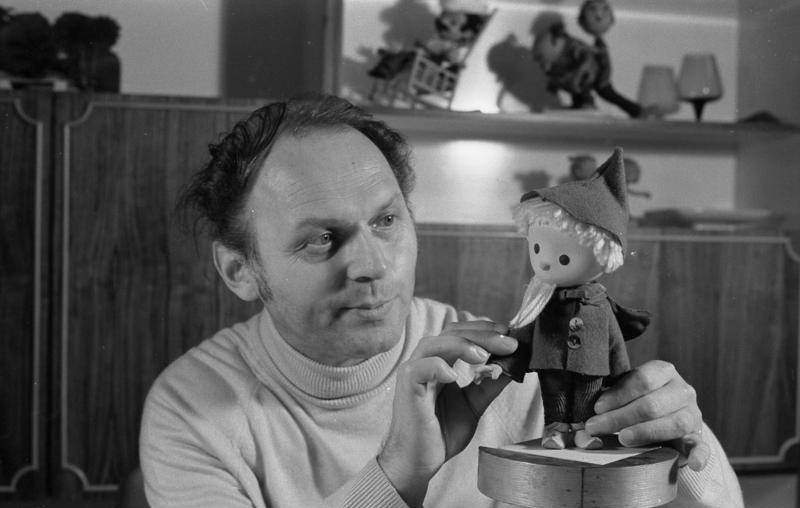
Gerhard Behrendt with Sandmännchen

- In Minneapolis, on the morning of the American Football League's first owners' meeting, the Minneapolis Star-Journal carried the headline "MINNESOTA TO GET NFL FRANCHISE". The owners of the AFL Minneapolis team denied the story, but soon were awarded the NFL's 14th team, the Minnesota Vikings. Legend has it that Harry Wismer brought copies of the newspaper to a banquet, pointed to Max Winter, and said, "This is the last supper. And he's Judas!" The Minneapolis AFL team was replaced by the Oakland Raiders.
- The New England Patriots American football team, known then as the Boston Patriots, was founded by Billy Sullivan in Boston, United States.
- Died: Sam M. Lewis, 74, American songwriter

== November 23, 1959 (Monday) ==
- The Curtiss-Wright Corporation announced that it had developed a new internal combustion engine, in conjunction with NSU Motorenwerke AG of Germany. With only two moving parts (the rotor and the crankshaft) this would later be called the rotary engine.
- African track athletes Yotham Muleya and John Winter, both students at Central Michigan College, were fatally injured in a car crash near Mt. Pleasant, Michigan, while on their way to a track meet at Michigan State University in East Lansing. The car in which they were riding went out of control after passing another vehicle and collided head-on with the car of two men on a hunting trip, killing both hunters. Muleya, the three-mile champion of Northern Rhodesia (Zambia) and the first black African to be permitted to run in a track meet in the segregated Southern Rhodesia, died later in the day, while his friend Winter of Southern Rhodesia, a white athlete who held the Rhodesian record for the quarter mile, died five days later.
- Born: Dominique Dunne, American actress (Poltergeist), in Santa Monica; she was killed in 1982 by her boyfriend shortly after the release of the film

== November 24, 1959 (Tuesday) ==
- TWA Flight 595, a cargo plane with three crew members on board, crashed into a Chicago neighborhood adjacent to Midway Airport. At 5:37 a.m., the Constellation airplane crashed at the corner of 64th Street and Knox Avenue, and destroyed apartments and bungalows. In addition to the crew, eight people on the ground were killed and 13 more injured.
- Near Geneva, the Proton Synchrotron developed by the European nuclear agency, CERN, went online and exceeded expectations, accelerating protons to 25 GeV (25 billion electron volts), more than twice as much as the Soviet synchrotron at Dubna.
- Died: Herbert "Daily" Messenger, 76, Australian rugby league star

== November 25, 1959 (Wednesday) ==
- The first Bilateral Investment Treaty (BIT) in history was signed between West Germany and Pakistan. BITs govern the terms of private investment between companies in the two nations, including provisions for arbitration of disputes.
- Born: Charles Kennedy, Scottish member of the British House of Commons and Leader of the Liberal Democrats from 1999 to 2006; in Inverness (d. 2015)

== November 26, 1959 (Thursday) ==
- The maiden flight of the Atlas-Able rocket, the most powerful ever built by the United States, failed less than a minute after its launch. The rocket lifted off at 2:26 a.m. from Cape Canaveral, with plans to carry the Pioneer V satellite to be placed in lunar orbit. Forty seconds later, parts fell from the third stage and the rocket misfired.
- Born: Dai Davies, Welsh politician and independent MP, in Ebbw Vale

== November 27, 1959 (Friday) ==
- More than 20,000 protesters in Tokyo, demanding that Japan end its military ties with the United States, stormed the grounds of the Japanese parliament. In the ensuing riot, 159 policemen and 212 civilians were injured in the worst violence in Japan since the May Day riots of 1952.
- Nazi war criminal Dr. Josef Mengele, the "Angel of Death" at the Auschwitz and Birkenau concentration camps, was granted citizenship by Paraguay, whose dictator Alfredo Stroessner refused to allow the extradition of a Paraguayan citizen. Mengele later fled to Brazil, and was never captured, living until 1979 when he drowned.
- Born: Viktoria Mullova, Russian violinist, in Zhukovsky

== November 28, 1959 (Saturday) ==
- Victims of the mercury-poisoning induced Minamata disease, and their families, began a sit-in at the chemical factory operated by Chisso in Minamata, Japan, and after a month's protest, secured an agreement for injury compensation.
- The first of the Nashville sit-ins, aimed at ending the policy of discrimination against African-Americans at lunch counters, began with a test run at Harveys Department Store in downtown Nashville, Tennessee. By 1960, the nonviolent protests were being duplicated, successfully and nationwide.
- Saint Louis University won the first ever NCAA college soccer tournament, beating the University of Bridgeport, 5 to 2, in the championship game of the 8-team playoff.
- Born: Judd Nelson, American actor (The Breakfast Club), in Portland, Maine

== November 29, 1959 (Sunday) ==
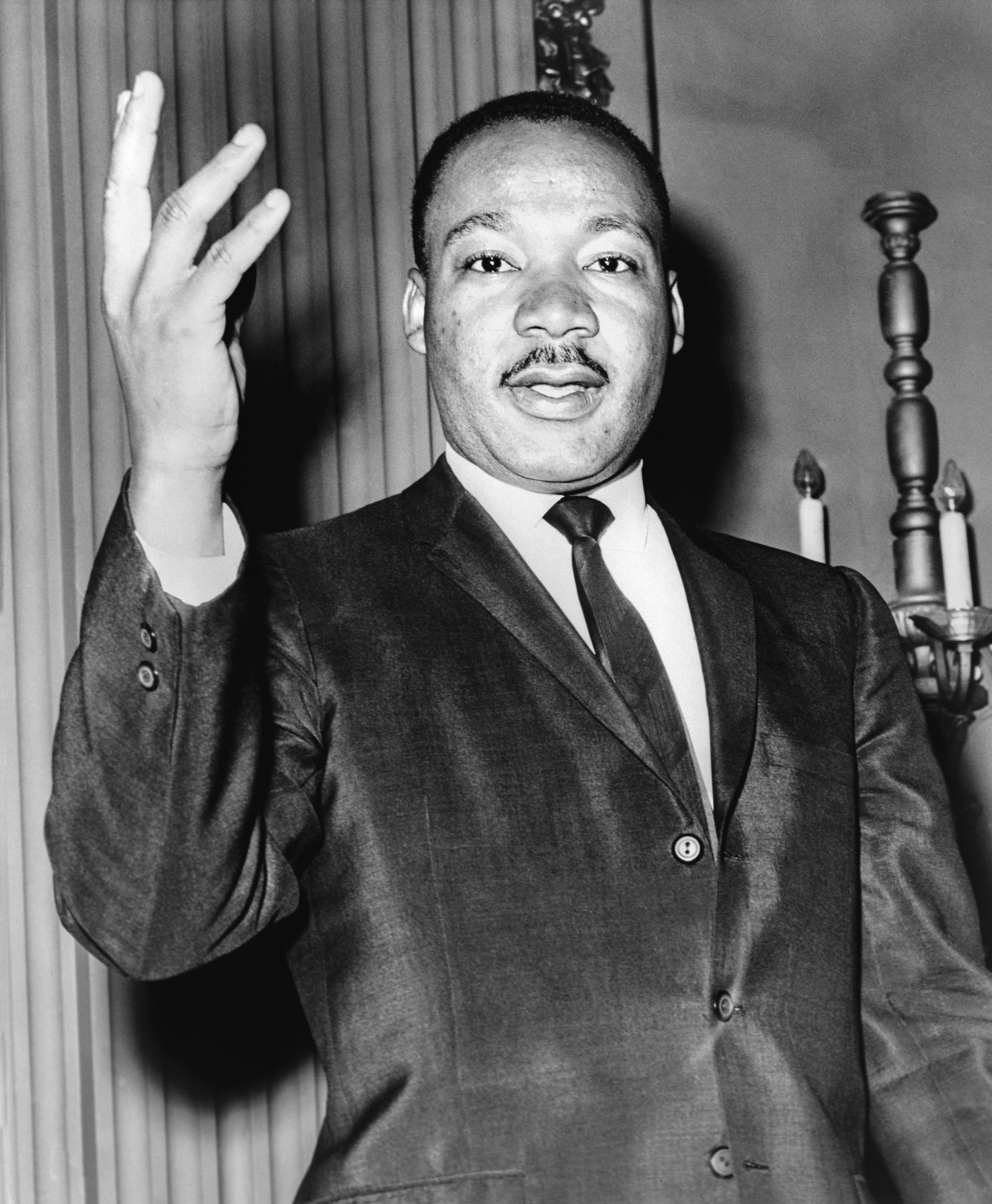
Dr. King

- The Reverend Martin Luther King Jr., preached his final sermon as pastor of the Dexter Avenue Baptist Church in Montgomery, Alabama, resigning to devote more time to the civil rights movement.
- Born: Rahm Emanuel, Mayor of Chicago (2011–2019) and White House Chief of Staff (2009–2010); in Chicago

== November 30, 1959 (Monday) ==
- In Hungary, János Kádár, leader of that nation's Communist Party since the Soviet invasion of 1956, announced that the nearly 60,000 Soviet troops stationed in Hungary would remain "as long as the international situation demands it". Occupation forces remained until 1991.
- Born: Lorraine Kelly, Scottish ITV news presenter; in East Kilbride

== November 1959 ==
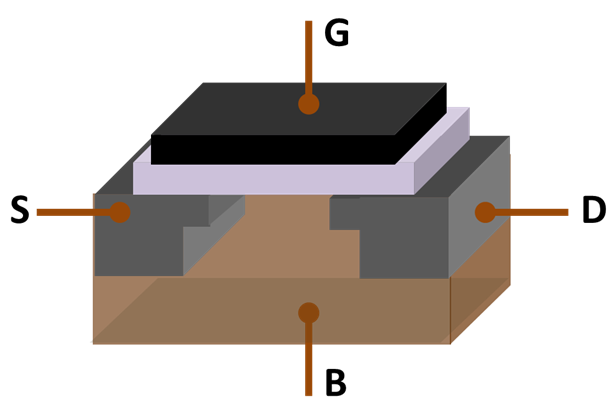
The MOSFET (MOS transistor) was invented by Mohamed Atalla and Dawon Kahng at Bell Labs. It is central to the Digital Revolution, and the most widely manufactured device in history.

- The MOSFET (metal–oxide–semiconductor field-effect transistor), also known as the MOS transistor, was invented by Mohamed Atalla and Dawon Kahng at Bell Labs in November 1959. It revolutionized the electronics industry, and became the fundamental building block of the Digital Revolution. The MOSFET went on to become the most widely manufactured device in history.
