= December 1959 =

Month of 1959

<<	December 1959					>>
Su	Mo	Tu	We	Th	Fr	Sa
		1	2	3	4	5
6	7	8	9	10	11	12
13	14	15	16	17	18	19
20	21	22	23	24	25	26
27	28	29	30	31

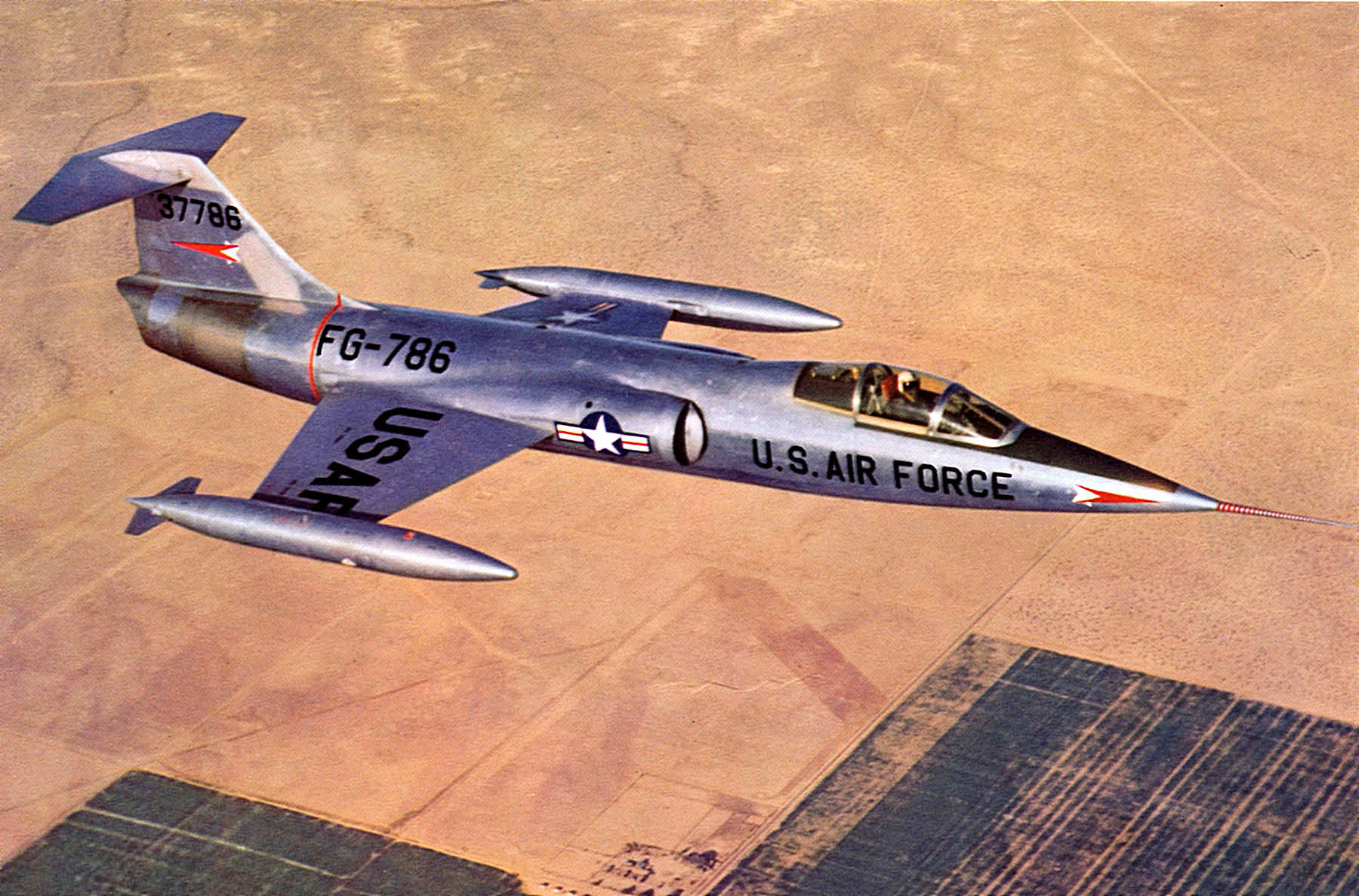
December 14, 1959: First manned flight above 100,000 feet

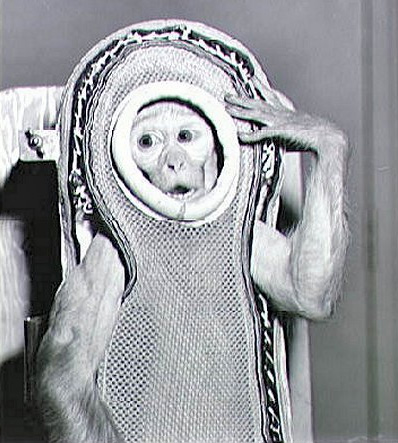
December 4, 1959: U.S. rhesus monkey Sam launched into mesosphere

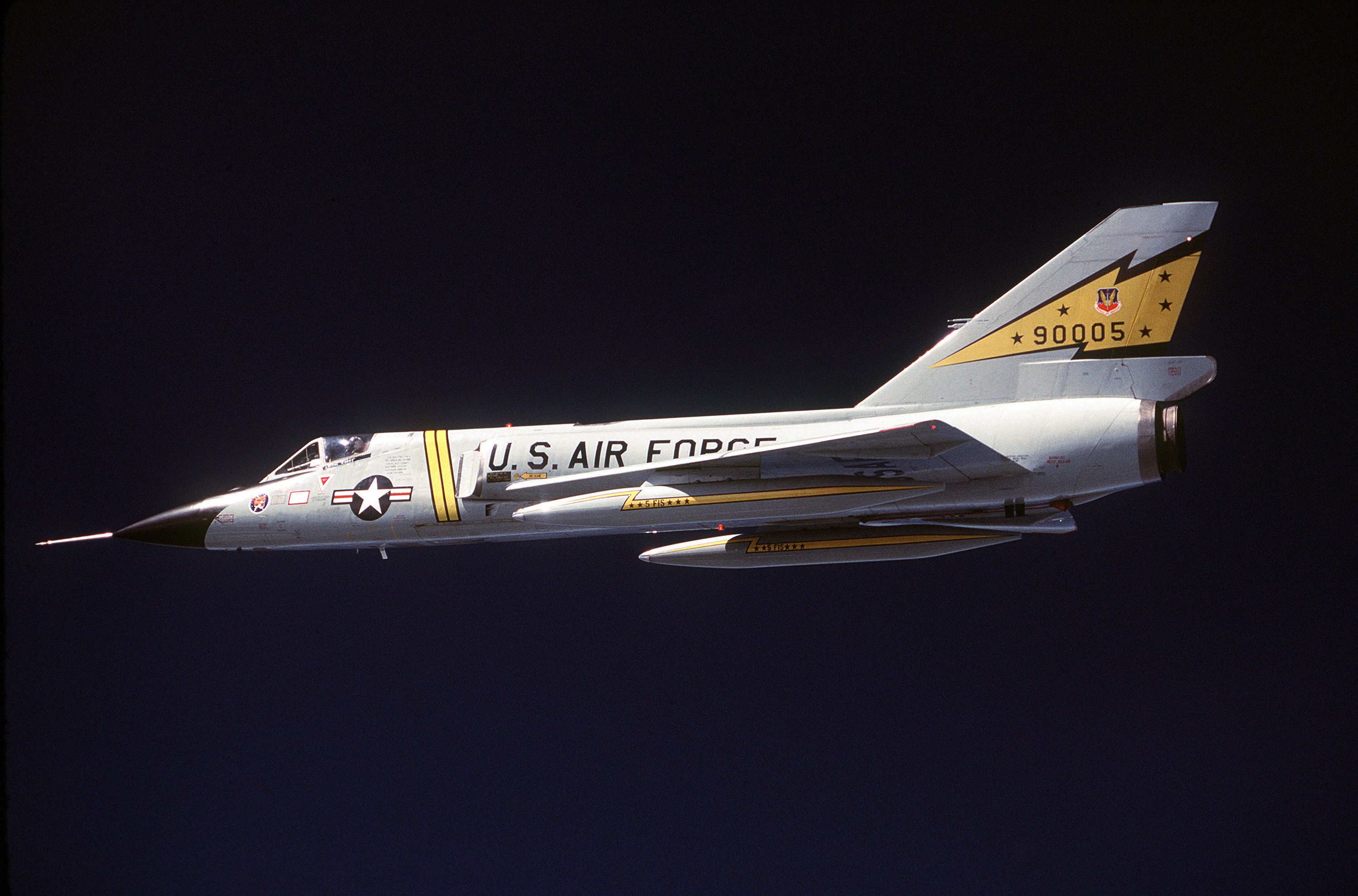
December 15, 1959: First manned flight of more than 1,500 mph

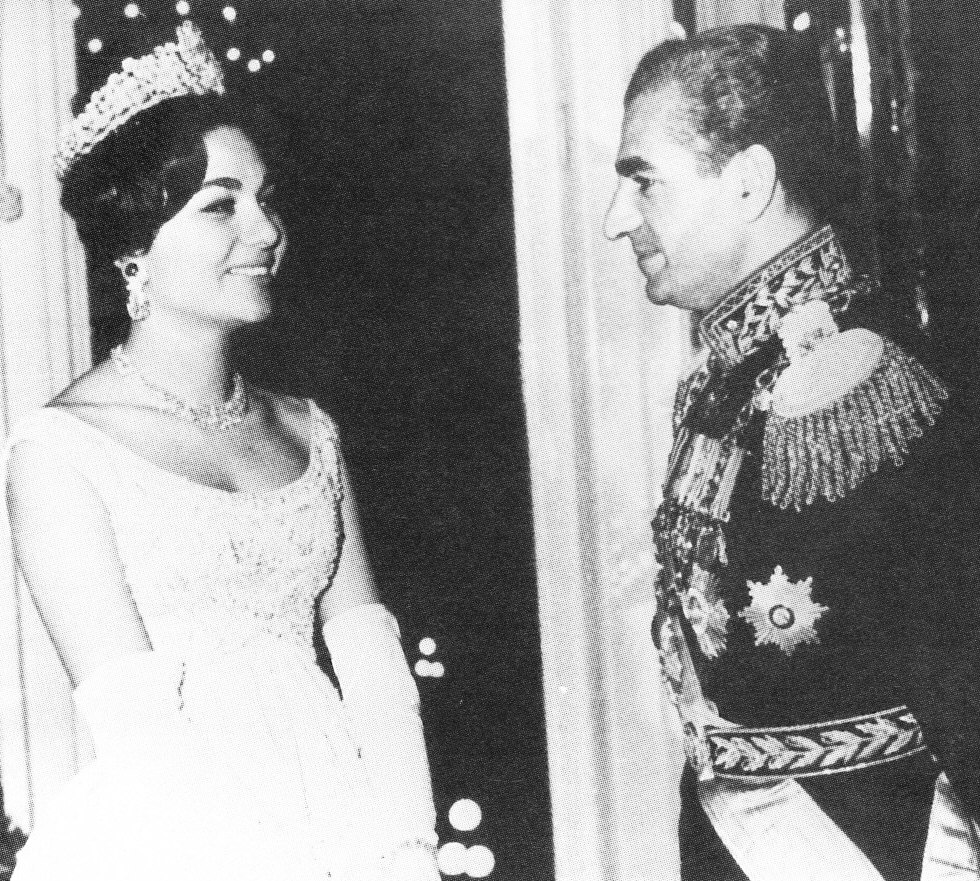
December 21, 1959: The last royal wedding in Iran takes place

The following events occurred in December 1959:

== December 1, 1959 (Tuesday) ==
- The Antarctic Treaty was signed by all 12 nations that had stations in Antarctica. It came into force on June 23, 1961. Article I provides that "Antarctica shall be used for peaceful purposes only."
- Humble Oil Company was acquired by Standard Oil of New Jersey, later Exxon.
- Allegheny Airlines Flight 371, flying from Philadelphia to Cleveland, crashed, killing 24 of the 25 people on board.
- The children's bedtime program Das Sandmännchen (The Sandman) premiered on West German television channels SFB, BR, WDR and NDR, nine days after a similar program debuted on television in East Germany. Production for it ceased in 1991 because of the German Reunification.
- Born:
  - Billy Childish (stage name for Steven Hamper), English artist; in Chatham, Kent
  - Wally Lewis, Australian rugby star and sportscaster; in Hawthorne, Queensland

== December 2, 1959 (Wednesday) ==
- Kurt Franz, who had been a deputy commander of the Treblinka concentration camp, was arrested in Düsseldorf after 14 years working as a cook. He was released from prison in 1993.
- The collapse of a dam at Malpasset released the waters of the Reyran River and killed 433 people in the French city of Fréjus. At 9:14 pm, 48 million cubic metres of water were released 12 kilometres (7.5 mi) from Fréjus.
- Behind the Great Wall, presented by Walter Reade, Jr. in "AromaRama", made its debut at the DeMille Theater in New York. The Italian film was edited by Reade to include various scents circulated by the theater air conditioning system. The release preceded, by three weeks, the debut of Scent of Mystery, in Smell-O-Vision.

== December 3, 1959 (Thursday) ==
- U.S. President Dwight D. Eisenhower departed the United States for a "mission of peace and goodwill" that would last nearly three weeks, taking him 22,000 miles (35,000 km) and bringing him to eleven nations on three continents. The American president visited Italy, Turkey, Pakistan, Afghanistan, Iran, India, Greece, Tunisia, France, Spain and Morocco.

== December 4, 1959 (Friday) ==
- Puyi, the last Emperor of China, received a "special pardon" from the Supreme People’s Court and was released from Fushun War Criminals Prison following his ten years of imprisonment for his involvement with the Japanese interwar and WWII-era puppet state Manchukuo.
- "Sam", an American-born rhesus monkey, was launched toward space from Wallops Island, Virginia, at 11:15 am on the Little Joe 2 suborbital flight to test the emergency escape mechanism. At 19 miles (31 km) altitude, the capsule was jettisoned and climbed further to reach 53 miles (85 km), then returned to Earth. The spacecraft was recovered by the USS Borie. "Sam" withstood the trip and the recovery in good condition.
- Born: Christa Luding-Rothenburger, German multiple athlete, each two titles on speed skating for Winter Olympics and ISU World Sprint Speed Skating Championships, a one title on track cycling for 1986 UCI Track Cycling World Championships; in Weißwasser, Saxony, East Germany (present-day Germany)
- Died: Hubert Marischka, 77, Austrian director

== December 5, 1959 (Saturday) ==
- The Syracuse University Orangemen defeated the UCLA Bruins 36–8 to finish as college football's only unbeaten and untied (10–0–0) team. The following Monday, Syracuse became the national champion, finishing No. 1 in both the AP and UPI polls.

== December 6, 1959 (Sunday) ==
- The Stadio San Paolo, with a capacity for 85,012 fans, opened in Fuorigrotta, Italy, as the home stadium for the Napoli soccer football club. The "Azzurri" beat visiting Juventus, 2–1.
- Canton, Ohio, began its quest to host a Pro Football Hall of Fame, with an editorial in the Canton Repository.
- Born: Satoru Iwata, Japanese CEO of Nintendo; in Sapporo (d. 2015)

== December 7, 1959 (Monday) ==
- Olongapo, a U.S. Navy base at Subic Bay, was turned over to Philippine control, along with its infrastructure. Its 60,000 Filipino residents became citizens of the Philippines, and the area became the municipality of Olongapo City.
- Tenney Engineering Corporation was chosen by the Space Task Group to construct the Mercury altitude test chamber in Hangar S at Cape Canaveral. When completed, altitude pressure would simulate 225,000 feet (69,000 m). The chamber, a vertical cylinder with domed ends, was 12 feet (3.7 m) in diameter and 14 feet (4.3 m) high. The chamber was designed to allow a partial spacecraft functional check in a near-vacuum environment.

== December 8, 1959 (Tuesday) ==
- Nikita Khrushchev sent a secret memo to the Soviet Politburo, outlining his proposal for a change in Soviet defense strategy, with an emphasis on building the nation's nuclear arsenal as a deterrent against invasion. The Politburo approved the proposal on December 14, followed by the CPSU Central Committee on December 26, and the announcement was made public on January 14.
- Louis G. Cowan was fired from his job as President of the CBS Television Network as a result of the quiz show scandals of 1959. Cowan had become president after the success of a show that he had created, The $64,000 Question.
- A SAM Colombia airliner, with 42 passengers and three crew, disappeared shortly after takeoff from the San Andrés island resort while bringing vacationers on the 450 miles (720 km) trip to the Colombian mainland at Cartagena, with a final destination of Medellín. The Curtiss C-46 gave its last report 20 minutes after departure, stating that its altitude was 9,500 feet (2,900 m). The only trace of the airplane was found on December 16, when the right main gear wheel assembly was located in the sea.

Suriname's flag 1959-1975

- The government of Suriname, at the time a self-governing constituent state in South America within the jurisdiction of the Kingdom of the Netherlands, issued Decree G B No. 105, adopting a new flag, which would be raised on December 15. Upon full independence on November 25, 1975, the Republic of Suriname would adopt a new flag.
- The eight-person crew of the RNLB Mona died when their boat capsized during a night-time rescue operation.

== December 9, 1959 (Wednesday) ==
- U.S. President Dwight D. Eisenhower continued his foreign trip, being greeted by more than a million people in New Delhi before meeting the King of Afghanistan in Kabul. No American President visited Afghanistan again until 2006.
- The Norwegian freighter Oslo Motorship Buffalo was turned over by high winds, on the fifth day of a storm that claimed more than 100 lives across Europe. All 20 persons on board were killed.
- Born:
  - Mario Cantone, American actor and comedian; in Stoneham, Massachusetts
  - Terry Moran, American journalist, Senior White House correspondent at ABC News, in Chicago

== December 10, 1959 (Thursday) ==
- The People's Republic of China began a campaign urging Chinese people worldwide to "come back to the arms of the Motherland", and sent four ships to foreign ports for that purpose. Approximately 100,000 people took advantage of the offer.
- The United States withdrew its last military personnel from Iceland, where it had 5,200 people at Keflavik.
- The "Old Location Massacre" took place in Windhoek, the capital of the colony of South West Africa (now Namibia). Police killed eleven black Africans who were protesting their forced relocation to the new "township" of Katutura.
- In college basketball, Bowling Green State hit only 35.4% of its shots in a 74–68 loss to DePaul. Two days later, Bowling Green lost to Bradley, 99–72. Falcons' player Billy Reed later testified that he and other players had been point shaving after being paid by Jack Molinas.

== December 11, 1959 (Friday) ==
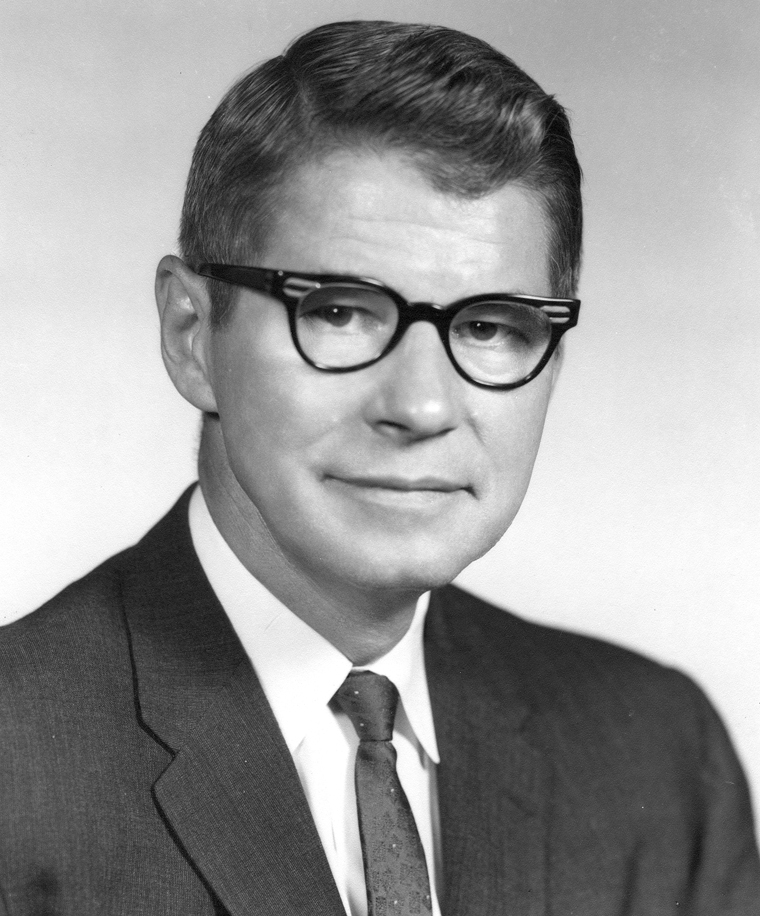
Governor Freeman

- The city of Albert Lea, Minnesota, was placed under martial law by order of Governor Orville Freeman, as 80 National Guardsmen occupied the town to intervene in a strike at the Wilson Packing Company. A federal court ruled twelve days later that Governor Freeman had overstepped his authority, holding that "military rule cannot be imposed upon a community simply because it may seem to be more expedient than to enforce the law by using the National Guard to aid the local civil authorities".
- U.S. Central Intelligence Agency (CIA) Director Allen Dulles received a top secret memo from J.C. King, Director of the agency's Western Hemisphere Division, recommending that "thorough consideration be given the elimination of Fidel Castro". The first of many CIA-sponsored assassination attempts, none of them successful, took place the next July.
- Born: Lisa Gastineau, American socialite and reality show star, as Lisa D'Amico in Rockland County, New York
- Died: Jim Bottomley, 59, American baseball player

== December 12, 1959 (Saturday) ==
- The first elections in Nigeria took place in advance of the West African nation's independence from Britain. Nigeria became independent on October 1, 1960.
- ASECNA, which regulates air traffic control in Africa, was created by a treaty signed in Saint-Louis, Senegal. The acronym stands for Agence pour la SECurité de la NAvigation aérienne en Afrique et à Madagascar.
- UNCOPUOS, the United Nations Committee on the Peaceful Uses of Outer Space, was established.
- The test launch of an uncrewed Titan rocket from Cape Canaveral failed four seconds after ignition, with the rocket collapsing on the launch pad and exploding. Nobody was injured, but the film clip of the launch remains a feature in documentaries about the American space program.
- Paraguayan forces drove off an attempted invasion by rebels, who crossed over from Argentina to attack at Pilar and Encarnacion.

== December 13, 1959 (Sunday) ==
- An explosion levelled two apartment houses in a suburb of Dortmund, West Germany, at 3:12 a.m. Of 34 people in the Aplerbeck buildings, 26 were killed.
- The Archbishop Makarios III was elected the first President of Cyprus, with 67 percent of the votes of the Greek Cypriot community.
- The Wizard of Oz was aired for the second time on CBS television. This telecast was such a success that it spurred CBS to make the film an annual television tradition. The film had been shown only once before on TV (November 3, 1956).
- Born: Johnny Whitaker, American actor known for portraying "Jody" in Family Affair; in Van Nuys, California

== December 14, 1959 (Monday) ==
- The Heritage Range, southern portion of the Ellsworth Mountains in Antarctica, was seen for the first time, on a reconnaissance flight originating from Byrd Station.
- Test pilot Joe Jordan became the first human being to reach an altitude of more than 100,000 feet (30,000 m), flying an F-104 Starfighter to an altitude of 103,395 feet (31,515 m).
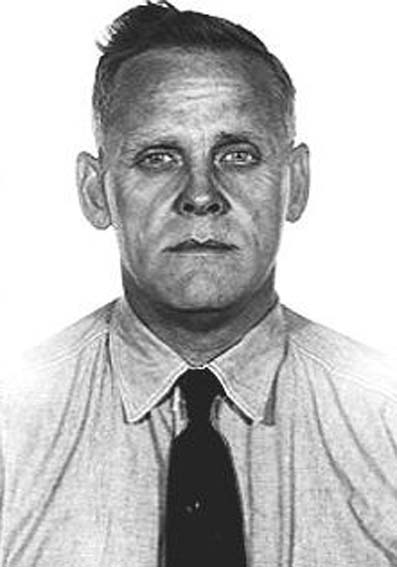
  General Secretary Hall in 1954 mugshot
- The Strategic Rocket Forces was created in the Soviet Union as a separate branch of the military, with responsibility over all Soviet ballistic missiles. The SRF is now administered by the Russian Federation.
- Gus Hall was elected the new General Secretary of the Communist Party of the United States, at the CPUSA's 17th National Convention, held in Harlem. Hall led the CPUSA until his death in 2000.

== December 15, 1959 (Tuesday) ==
- Major Joseph W. Rogers became the first person to travel faster than 1,500 miles per hour (2,400 km/h), and almost reached 2,500 kilometres per hour (1,600 mph), breaking the world speed record at 1,525.96 mph (2,455.79 km/h), in an F-106 Delta Dart jet fighter.

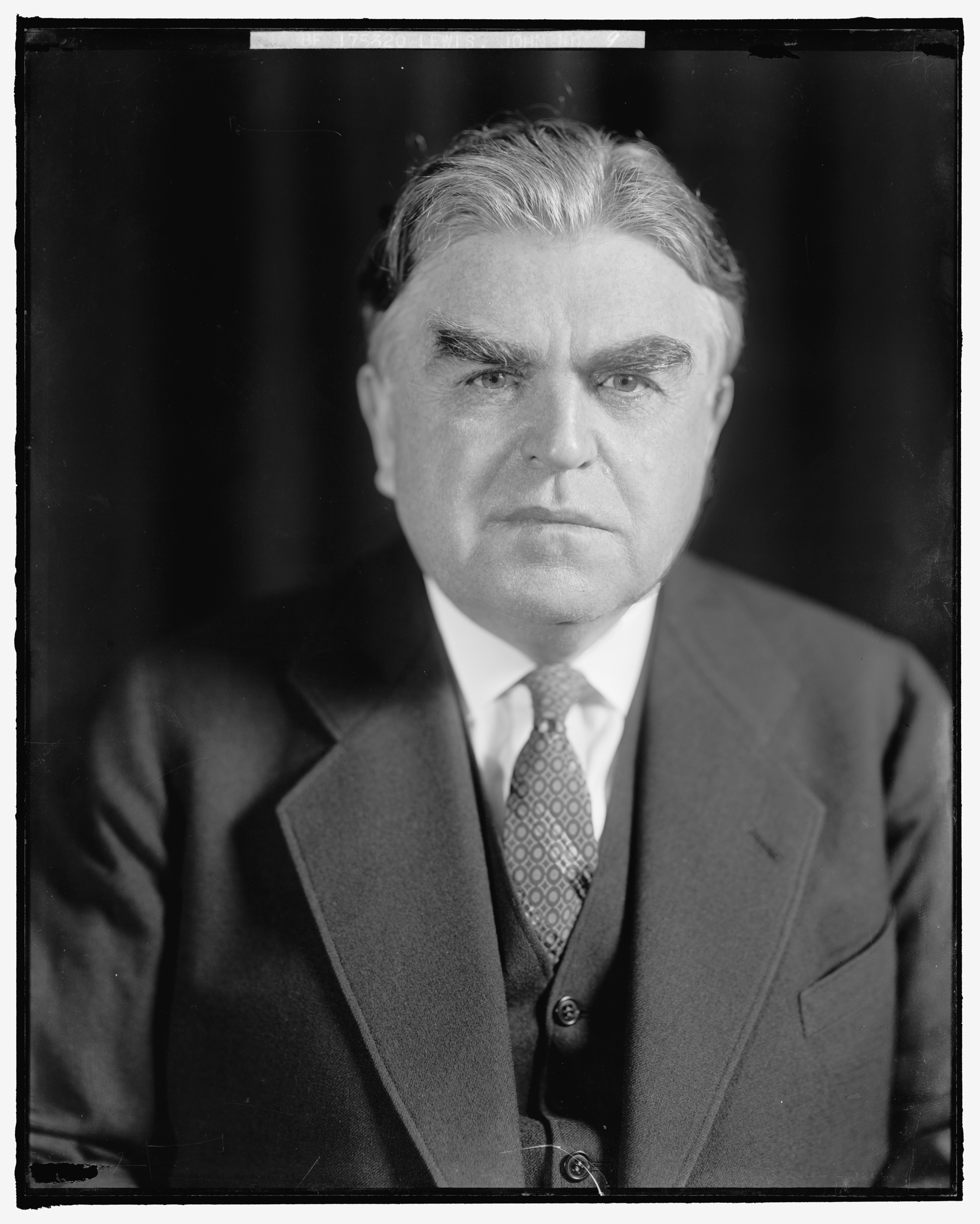
Lewis

- John L. Lewis announced that he would retire as President of the United Mine Workers of America after 40 years.
- Indian Railways introduces the first train under 25 kV AC traction between Rajkharswan and Dangoaposi stations of South Eastern Railway.

== December 16, 1959 (Wednesday) ==
- The Supreme Court of Japan reversed a lower court ruling in the Sunakawa case and held that the presence of United States forces in Japan did not violate that nation's Constitution.
- China Airlines, the Taiwanese national carrier, was founded.
- The improvisational comedy troupe Second City was founded at 1842 N. Wells Street in Chicago. Its cast has included such stars as Alan Arkin, Bill Murray, Mike Myers, Chris Farley, Julia Louis-Dreyfus and John Candy.
- Also in Chicago, Prohibition-era gangster Roger Touhy was killed outside of his home at 125 North Lotus Avenue. He had been released from prison on November 24 after serving nearly twenty-six years.

== December 17, 1959 (Thursday) ==
- On the Beach, the Stanley Kramer film adaptation of Nevil Shute's novel about World War III, premiered in 18 cities around the world, including New York, London and Moscow.

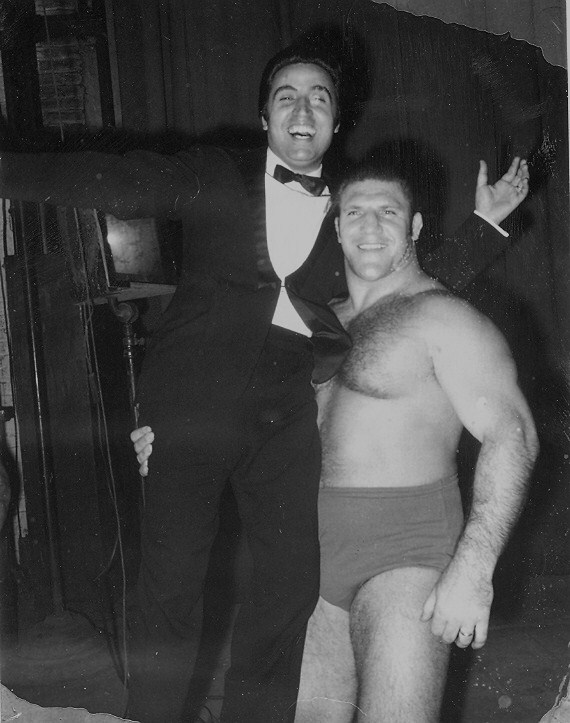
Sammartino

- Bruno Sammartino, who reigned as World Wrestling Federation champion from 1963 to 1971, and again from 1973 to 1977, made his professional wrestling debut, pinning Dmitri Grabowski in 19 seconds in a match in Pittsburgh.
- Born: Gregg Araki, independent film director; in Los Angeles

== December 18, 1959 (Friday) ==
- Abd al-Karim Qasim, Iraq's leader, declared that the Khūzestān Province of Iran "was part of Iraqi territory". Tensions over the disputed territory finally triggered the Iran–Iraq War, which lasted from 1980 to 1988.
- Filming began for the infamous "shower scene" from Psycho and continued for five days.

== December 19, 1959 (Saturday) ==
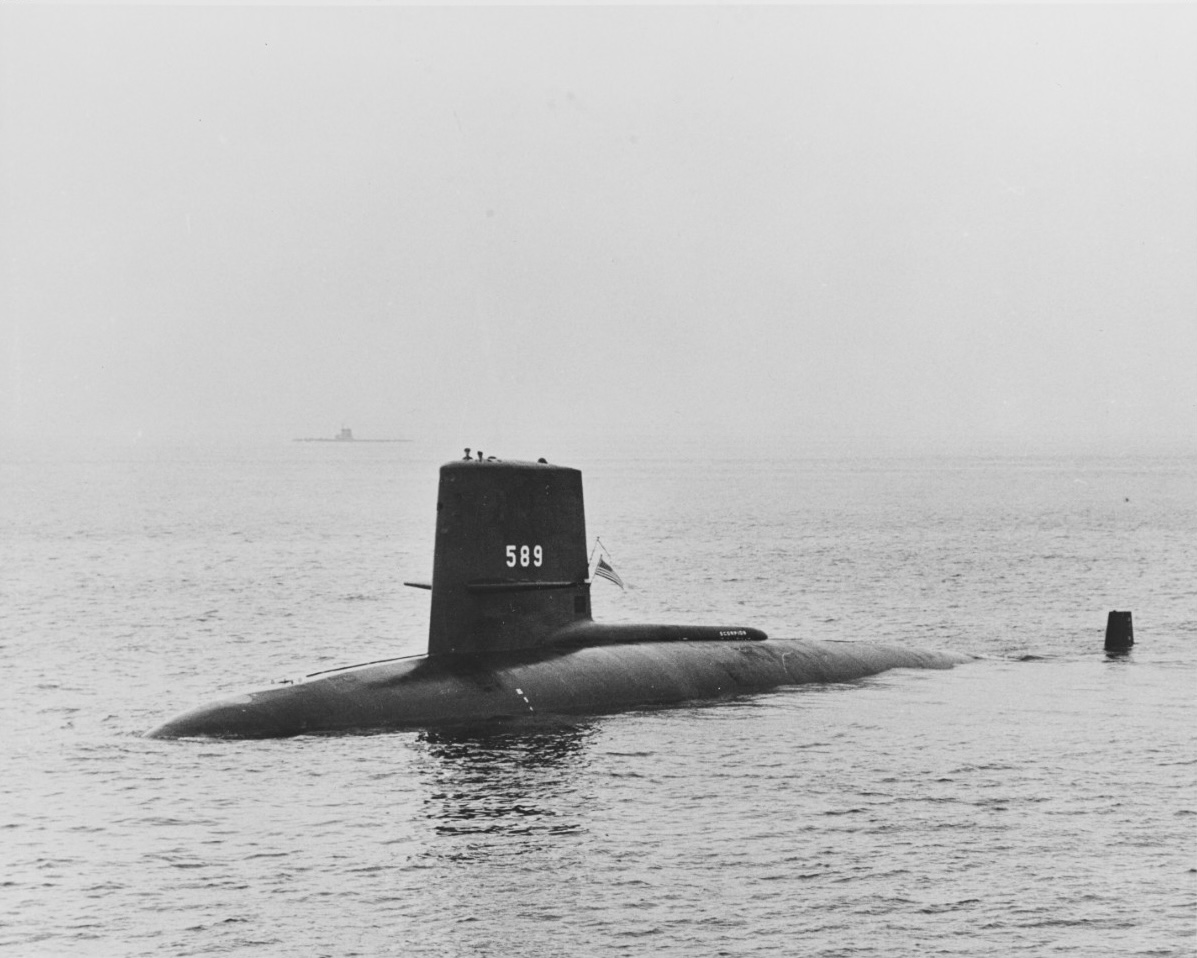
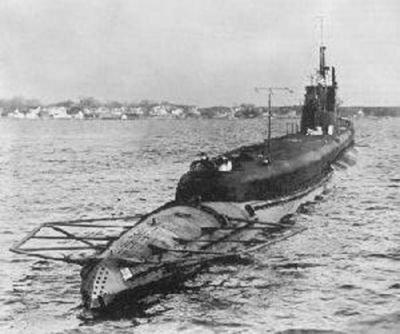
USS Scorpion (lost 1968) and USS Scorpion (lost 1944)
- The nuclear submarine USS Scorpion (SSN-589) was launched from Groton. Elizabeth Morrison, whose father had died in the 1944 loss, with all hands, of the previous submarine USS Scorpion (SS-278), christened the sub. The new USS Scorpion was lost with all hands on May 22, 1968.
- Walker family murders: In Osprey, Florida, Christine Walker, her husband Cliff, and her two children were murdered. The case has never been solved.
- Born: Waise Lee, Chinese action film star; in Hong Kong
- Died: Walter Williams, 105, who claimed to have been the last surviving veteran of the American Civil War, died in Houston, and was eulogized nationwide. However, not everyone believed that Williams was 117 or that he had served in the Confederate army. In September 1960, researcher Lowell K. Bridwell would concluded that there was no evidence to prove Williams's claimed service or his 1842 birthdate. In 1991, researcher William Marvel, writing for the magazine Blue and Gray, would determine from census records that Williams had been born in 1854 and was only ten years old when the war ended.

== December 20, 1959 (Sunday) ==
- Nine people were killed and 21 injured when a cattle truck struck a Greyhound Scenicruiser bus near Tucson, Arizona. The force of the impact was severe enough that calves were hurled into the bus.

== December 21, 1959 (Monday) ==
- The royal wedding in Iran saw the Shah, Mohammed Reza Pahlavi, go through a Muslim ceremony with 21-year-old student Farah Diba. Farah provided her husband with a male heir in 1960, and fled with him when the monarchy was abolished in 1979.
- The city of Grover Beach, California, was incorporated.
- Born: Florence Griffith Joyner, American track star nicknamed "Flo-Jo"; in Los Angeles (d. 1998)

== December 22, 1959 (Tuesday) ==
- A mid-air collision near Rio de Janeiro killed 36 people, including those on a Vickers Viscount passenger plane.
- Chuck Berry was arrested in St. Louis shortly after midnight, after completing a concert at his Club Bandstand nightclub, and charged with violating the Mann Act. Berry was convicted and served time in jail until 1961.
- On the last day of his overseas goodwill tour, U.S. President Dwight D. Eisenhower, in conjunction with King Mohammed V of Morocco, announced that U.S. forces would be issued a statement that all American forces would be withdrawn from the North African nation by the end of 1963. At the time, there were 10,000 American servicemen in Morocco, serving at the Port Lyautey Naval Base, and U.S. Air Force bases at Ben Guerir, Boulhaut, Salé and Sidi Slimane.
- The Redstone launch vehicle for the Mercury-Redstone 1 mission was installed on the interim test stand at the Army Ballistic Missile Agency for static testing.
- Born: Bernd Schuster, German footballer with 21 caps for the West Germany national team; in Augsburg
- Died: Gilda Gray, 58, actress who popularized the shimmy

== December 23, 1959 (Wednesday) ==
- At Stanford University, heart surgeon Dr. Richard Lower, with the assistance of Dr. Norman Shumway, performed a successful heart transplant of one dog's heart into the heart of another dog. Previously, the longest that a host animal had survived with a transplanted heart had been 7 1/2 hours. The mongrel survived for eight days before being painlessly put to sleep on December 31 because of an infection. One of the breakthroughs made by Dr. Lower was the prevention of venous clots by leaving part of the original heart auricles in the host.
- Died: Lord Halifax (Edward Wood), 78, Viceroy of India 1926–1929 and British Foreign Secretary 1938–1940

== December 24, 1959 (Thursday) ==
- Newly appointed as a Roman Catholic Bishop, Karol Wojtyla defied authorities in Poland by celebrating a midnight Mass in an open field in Nowa Huta, the first Polish city to be constructed without a church. Wojtyla continued to celebrate the annual Mass until he later became Pope John Paul II.
- The colonial government in the Belgian Congo formally recognized the legality of the Kimbanguist Church.
- In the first significant instance of anti-Semitism in postwar Germany, a swastika was painted on the synagogue in Cologne. Over the next nine days, over 600 instances of anti-Semitic vandalism were reported in Europe.
- Born: Keith Deller, English darts champion; in Ipswich, Suffolk

== December 25, 1959 (Friday) ==
- In Seoul, South Korea, General Carter B. Magruder, Commander of the United Nations Forces, warned that "North Korean forces have large caliber artillery for which atomic warheads might be provided." General Magruder did not elaborate further on the North Korean "atomic cannon".
- Born: Michael P. Anderson, American shuttle astronaut; in Plattsburgh, New York. In 2003, he was killed on the last mission of Space Shuttle Columbia.

== December 26, 1959 (Saturday) ==
- Twelve days after it was first seen by humans, the Heritage Range in Antarctica was visited for the first time, by a team led by Campbell Craddock, Edward C. Thiel, and Edwin S. Robinson, who landed near Pipe Peak.
- Nelson Rockefeller announced that he would not seek the Republican Party nomination for 1960.

== December 27, 1959 (Sunday) ==
- Johnny Unitas led the Baltimore Colts to a 31–16 win over the New York Giants to win the NFL Championship.
- Born: Gerina Dunwich, American Wiccan author; in Chicago

== December 28, 1959 (Monday) ==
- In Jersey City, New Jersey, 69-year-old Matthew Jaksch was robbed by two men as he was going to the bank. Taken in the robbery were two relics from the Crucifixion, which had been given to Jaksch's Austrian ancestors by Pope Benedict XIV: a piece of a thorn from the Crown of Thorns ($40,000) and a splinter from the Cross ($30,000).
- Tom Landry, defensive coach for the Giants, was signed as the new coach of the Dallas Rangers, which were seeking admission as the NFL's 13th team. Landry coached the renamed Dallas Cowboys for 29 seasons.
- The city of Lawndale, California, was incorporated, following a December 1 referendum where the vote in favor of becoming a city was 1,892 to 572. Chester Brown was sworn in as the first mayor at a ceremony at Will Rogers School.
- Died:
  - Ante Pavelić, 70, puppet ruler of Nazi Independent State of Croatia, 1941–1945
  - Walther Buhle, 65 Nazi German general who was Chief of Staff for the Wehrmacht 1942 to 1945
  - Karoly Jordan, 88, Hungarian mathematician

== December 29, 1959 (Tuesday) ==
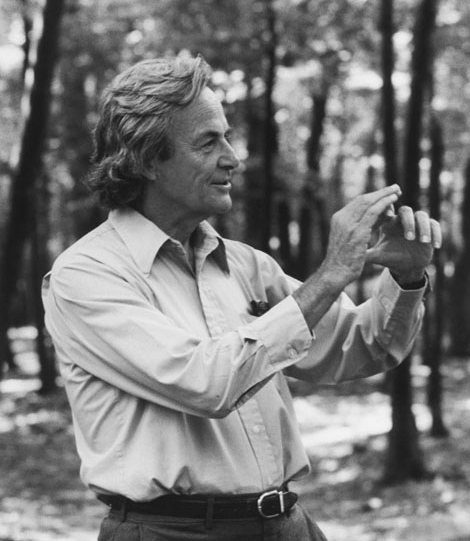
Professor Feynman

- On a day marked as the birth of nanotechnology, Professor Richard Feynman presented a lecture at the annual meeting of the American Physical Society at Caltech, entitled "There's Plenty of Room at the Bottom", posing the famous question, "Why cannot we write the entire 24 volumes of the Encyclopædia Britannica on the head of a pin?"
- President Dwight D. Eisenhower announced that the United States would not renew the voluntary moratorium on nuclear testing, set to expire on December 31.
- The Justice League of America was introduced by DC comics as issue number 28 of The Brave and the Bold (Feb.-Mar. 1960) reached newsstands.
- Born: Paula Poundstone, American comedian, author, actress and commentator; in Huntsville, Alabama

== December 30, 1959 (Wednesday) ==
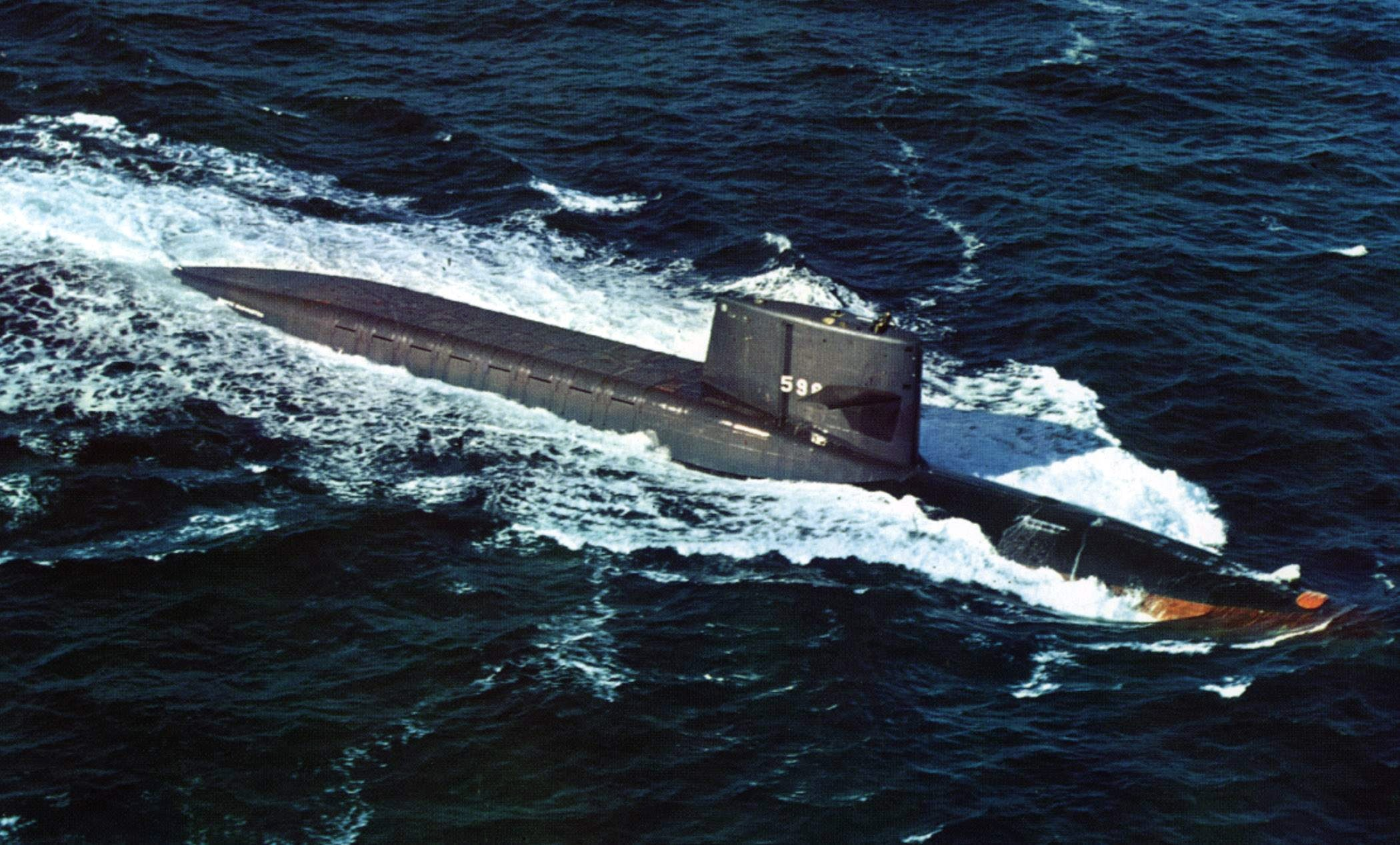
The first nuclear missile sub

- USS George Washington, the first nuclear missile submarine, was commissioned.
- Hubert H. Humphrey, U.S. Senator from Minnesota, became the first person to announce his candidacy for the 1960 Democratic Party presidential nomination (which John F. Kennedy would win).

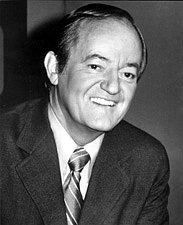
Senator Humphrey

- The Inter-American Development Bank formally began operations.

== December 31, 1959 (Thursday) ==
- Charles Maillefer patented the barrier screw, which increased the quality of plastic products manufactured through the process of extrusion.
- Michel Debré, the Prime Minister of France, proposed legislation that ended the "school war" (guerre scolaire) between France's public and private (mostly Catholic) schools. Under the "loi-Debré" that passed, the church schools could receive state support provided that they entered into an "association contract" with the government setting academic standards.
- At the end of the year, NASA funds in support of Project Mercury had been obligated to the listed organizations as follows: Air Force Ballistic Missile Division, Atlas launch vehicles, $22,830,000; Army Ordnance Missile Command, Redstone launch vehicles, $16,060,000; and McDonnell Aircraft Corporation, Mercury spacecraft, $49,407,540. Since being awarded the Mercury contract, McDonnell had expended 942,818 man-hours in engineering; 190,731 man-hours in tooling; and 373,232 man-hours in production.
- The Mercury astronauts completed basic and theoretical studies of Project Mercury in their training program and began practical engineering studies. This phase of the program was designed to provide a background in basic astronautical sciences and included such subjects as "Space Climate" and "Astronomy of the Universe." Shortly thereafter the astronauts began a practical training program involving egress training, methods of arresting rapid spacecraft motions, and familiarization with the weightless conditions of spaceflight.
- The longest-running missing-persons case in the UK began when 16-year-old Mary Flanagan disappeared while on her way to a New Year's Eve party being held at the factory where she worked in Silvertown, Essex.
- Born:
  - Alfie Anido, Filipino film actor; in Manila (d. 1981)
  - Val Kilmer, American film star; in Los Angeles (d. 2025)
  - Baron Waqa, President of Nauru 2013-2019; in Boe District
