= January 1960 =

Month of 1960

<<	January 1960					>>
Su	Mo	Tu	We	Th	Fr	Sa
					1	2
3	4	5	6	7	8	9
10	11	12	13	14	15	16
17	18	19	20	21	22	23
24	25	26	27	28	29	30
31

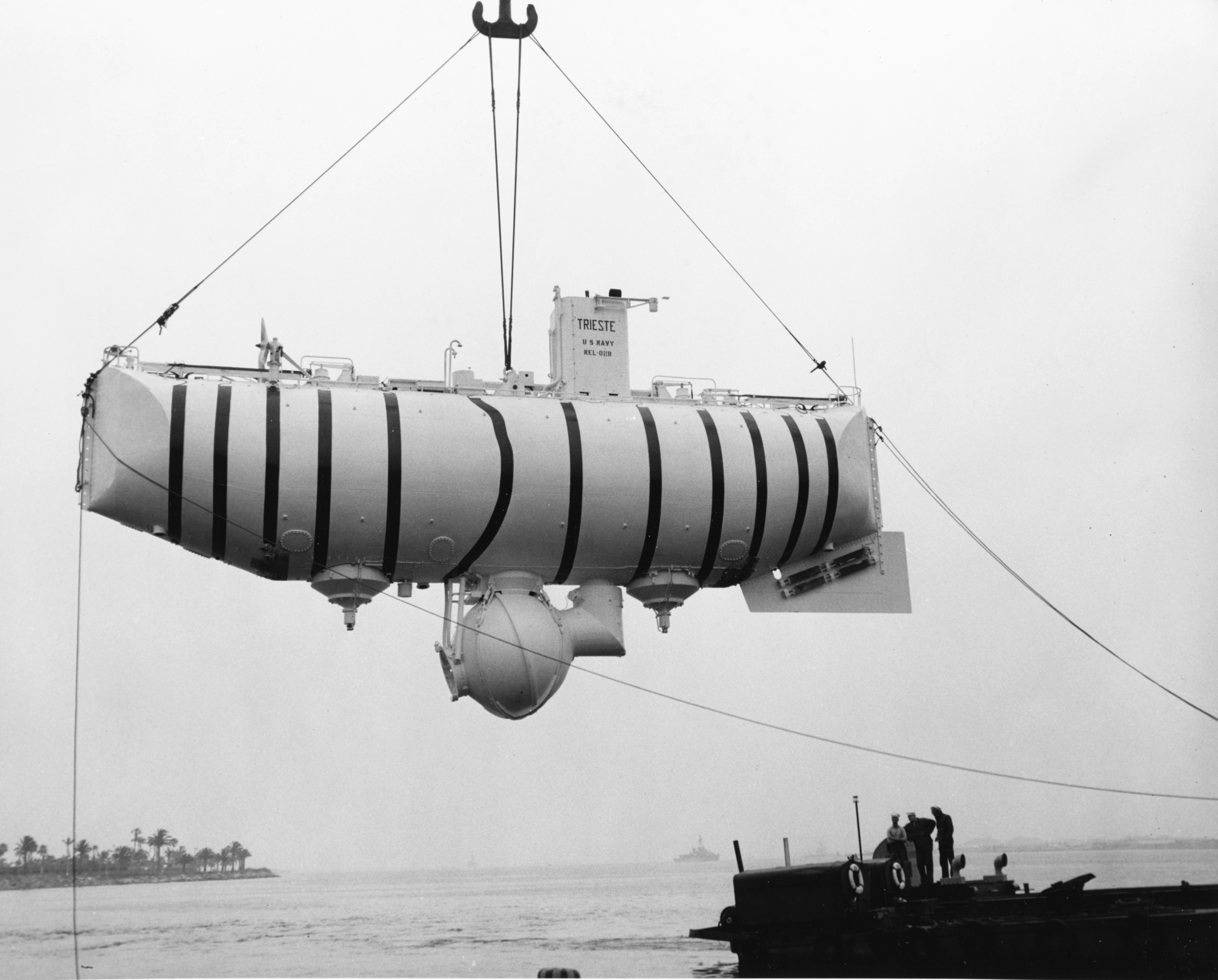
January 23, 1960: The bathyscaphe Trieste descends seven miles to the ocean floor

January 1, 1960: Cameroon granted independence

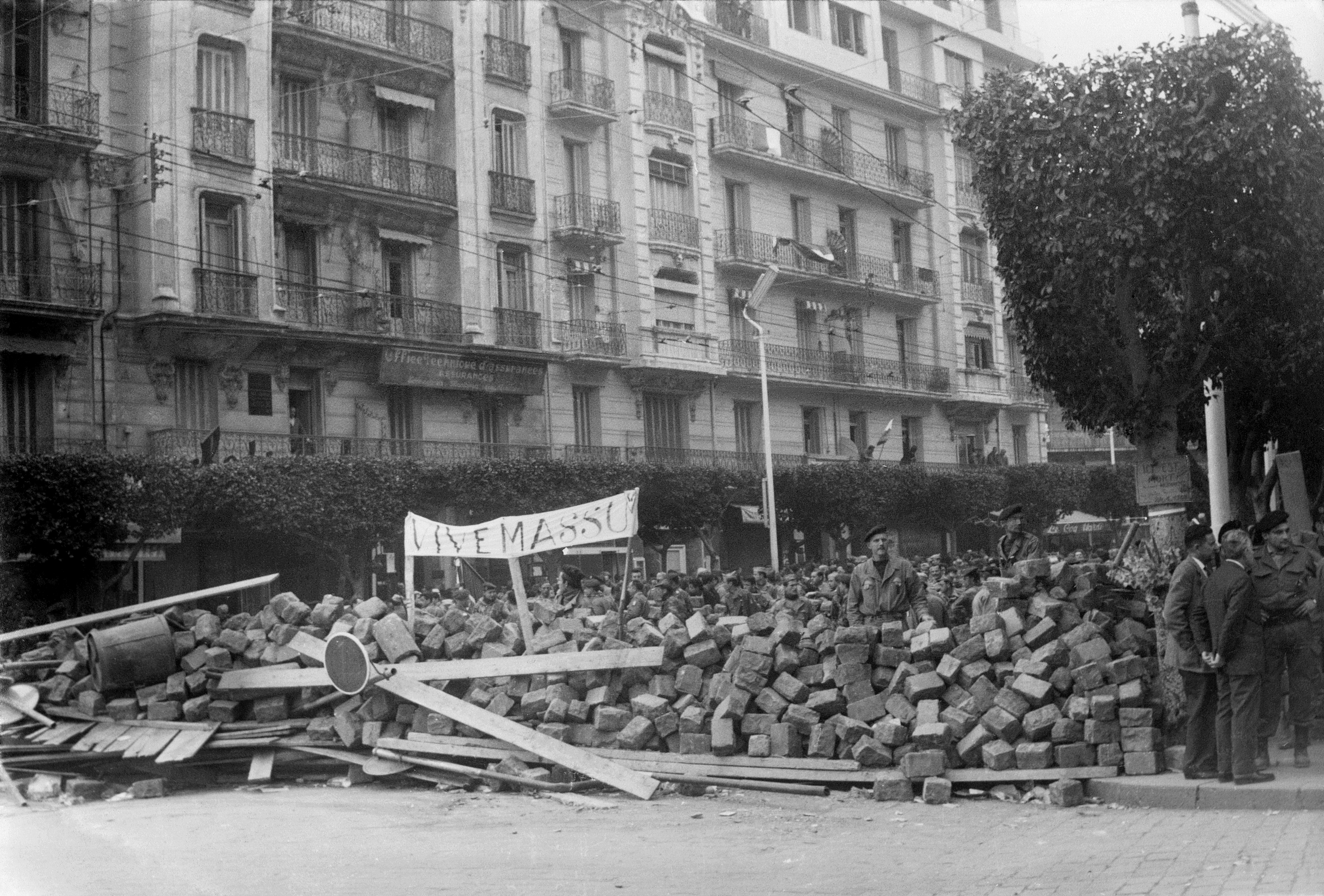
January 24, 1960: French Algerians erect barricades

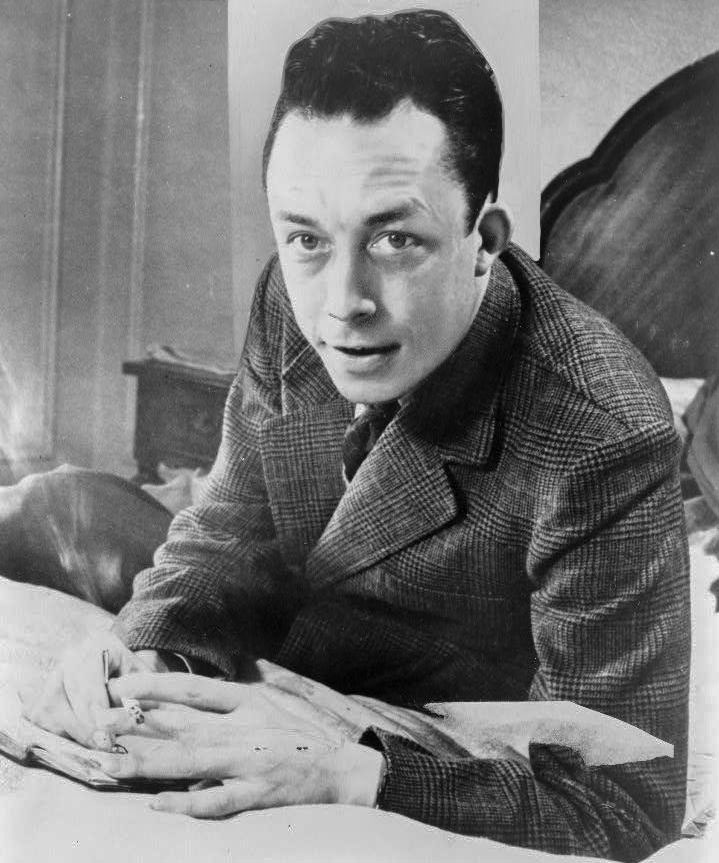
January 4, 1960: Albert Camus killed in auto accident

The following events occurred in January 1960:

== January 1, 1960 (Friday) ==
- The Republic of Cameroun became independent at midnight local time (2300 12/31/59 GMT) with the lowering of the French tricolor, and the raising of a new tricolor (red, yellow and green) flag at Yaoundé. The former French Cameroons colony had been under a U.N. Trusteeship during a transition period, and Prime Minister Ahmadou Ahidjo headed the government pending the adoption of a constitution. United Nations Secretary-General Dag Hammarskjöld, along with Henry Cabot Lodge Jr., the American Ambassador to the U.N., were present, along with the Soviet First Deputy Premier, Frol Kozlov, who announced that the Soviets would recognize the new government. Marxist Félix-Roland Moumié, who had previously been supported by the Soviet Union, continued to wage a campaign of terrorism against the Ahidjo government, and thirty people were killed on the Republic's first day.
- The peaceful New Year's Day March, a civil rights march at the airport of Greenville, South Carolina, took place with 250 African-American people protesting racial segregation. On October 25, a delegation of NAACP members had been waiting for the arrival of baseball great Jackie Robinson when they were told to move to a colored waiting room at the airport. Led by the chairman of the local Congress of Racial Equality (CORE), the Reverend J.S. Hall, the march concluded with the reading of a resolution by Rev. Matthew D. McCullough while a crowd of 200 White people listened.
- The symbolic "Doomsday Clock" on the cover of the Bulletin of the Atomic Scientists was moved back five minutes, from "two minutes to midnight" (where it had been since 1953) to "seven minutes to midnight".
- Three municipalities in Norway were created through mergers— Smøla Municipality (created from merging Edøy Municipality, Brattvær Municipality, and Hopen Municipality); Evje og Hornnes Municipality (created from merging Evje Municipality and Hornnes Municipality); and Sirdal Municipality (created from merging Tonstad Municipality and Øvre Sirdal Municipality).
- Midnight, January 1, 1960, is the point from which dates are measured under SAS System, Stata and R computer programming software.
- Three men— 22-year-old steelworker Mick McFarlane, 27-year-old soldier Thomas Owen, and 30-year-old Fred Morris— were killed and two wounded by a Somali national in a mass shooting in England at The East House, a pub at Spital Hill in Sheffield, South Yorkshire. The shooter, Maohamed Ismail, 30, would subsequently be determined to be insane.
- Born: James O'Barr, American comics artist, graphic artist, and writer, best known as the creator of the comic book series The Crow; in Detroit
- Died:
  - Margaret Sullavan, 50, American film actress, was killed by an accidental overdose of barbiturates.
  - Gianni Franciolini, 49, Italian film director and screenwriter, died in a hospital the day after undergoing surgery.

== January 2, 1960 (Saturday) ==
- At the Senate Caucus room in Washington, U.S. Senator John F. Kennedy of Massachusetts formally announced that he would seek the Democratic nomination for President of the United States. Addressing a question about whether being a Roman Catholic would affect his chances of winning, Senator Kennedy told them "I would think that there is really only one issue involved in the whole question of a candidate's religion, that is, does a candidate believe in the separation of church and state?"
- The temperature in Oodnadatta, South Australia, reached 50.7 °C (123.3 °F) in the shade, for what remains the highest temperature ever recorded in Australia.
- Born: Naoki Urasawa, Japanese manga author; in Tokyo
- Died: Friedrich Adler, 80, Austrian assassin who had killed Austrian Prime Minister Karl von Stürgkh in 1916

== January 3, 1960 (Sunday) ==
- The CBS Sports Spectacular made its debut at 3:00 EST, with Bud Palmer, with the aim of showing "sports you seldom see". The first show featured a complete game between basketball's Harlem Globetrotters and their foils at that time, the Baltimore Rockets.

== January 4, 1960 (Monday) ==
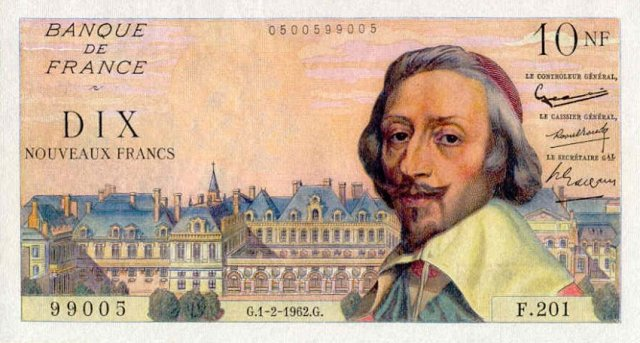
10 Nouveaux Francs

- The Bank of France issued the first bills for the nouveau franc worth one hundred ancients francs, and brought back the centime coin, replacing the old franc. The new franc, at roughly five to U.S. dollar, had become legal tender on January 1. To prepare the French for the changeover, the old-style bills had been overstamped with new value and the initials "N.F."
- The EFTA Treaty was signed in Stockholm by Austria, Denmark, Norway, Portugal, Sweden, Switzerland and the United Kingdom, to form the European Free Trade Association, a 7-member alternative for nations that could not be, or did not want to be, in the six-nation European Economic Community. The treaty took effect on May 3, 1960.
- The steel strike of 1959 was settled, three weeks before an injunction under the Taft-Hartley Act was set to expire, as Labor Secretary James P. Mitchell and Vice-President Richard M. Nixon mediated the dispute between the United Steelworkers Association and eleven steel manufacturers.
- Died: Albert Camus, 46, French writer, was killed in a car accident while riding in a Facel-Vega sports car driven by his publisher, Michel Gallimard. At 1:54 a.m. local time, near Villeneuve-la-Guyard, Yonne département, the car left the road and struck a tree. An unfinished, 144-page manuscript of Camus' latest novel was found near the wreckage. The First Man would finally be published 35 years later.

== January 5, 1960 (Tuesday) ==
- The Massachusetts Supreme Court ruled that a trust fund, set up by Benjamin Franklin's will in 1791 to assist "young married artificers", could not be divided before its 1991 maturity date, despite the fact that there were no more artificers who would benefit. Started by Franklin with the deposit of 1,000 pounds sterling, the fund had grown to $1,578,098 by 1960. By the time the monies were split between Massachusetts and Pennsylvania in 1991, the Fund was worth more than $6.5 million.
- British Prime Minister Harold Macmillan began a six-week, 20,000-mile (32,000 km) tour of Britain's current and former African colonies, not returning to London until February 15.
- Le Monde broke the news of a confidential report, made to the French government by the International Red Cross, documenting the French Army's torture in Algeria.

== January 6, 1960 (Wednesday) ==
- At Johns Hopkins Hospital in Baltimore, an emergency room intern, Dr. Henry Thomas, became the first person to save a life following CPR training. The technique of "closed chest compression" had been shown to Dr. Thomas and other physicians by Dr. James Jude whom developed it, but CPR had previously only been attempted during surgery. The patient, 45-year-old Eugene Barnes, had collapsed while removing his shirt for an examination. Dr. Thomas applied cardiopulmonary resuscitation and kept Barnes alive during a 22-minute wait for a defibrillator, and Barnes went on to a full recovery. The rest of the world would learn about CPR in the July 9, 1960, issue of the Journal of the American Medical Association.
- National Airlines Flight 2511 exploded in mid-flight at 18,000 feet (5,500 m) and crashed into a swamp at 2:00 a.m. near Bolivia, North Carolina, killing all 34 on board. The 29 passengers had been put on the Douglas DC-B for their Miami to New York flight, after their flight on a Boeing 707 had been cancelled. Killed in the crash was attorney Julian Frank, whose life had been insured by Dr. Robert Spears, listed as one of the dead from the 1959 crash of National Airlines Flight 967. Investigators concluded that Frank had unwittingly carried a bomb on board the plane inside his carry-on luggage. Dr. Spears was found and arrested in Arizona.
- The Associations Law officially came into force in Iraq (coinciding with Army Day), allowing the legal registration of political parties. Prior to the adoption of this law, political parties had been banned in Iraq since 1954.
- Scent of Mystery, presented by Mike Todd Jr. in "Smell-O-Vision", made its debut, at Chicago's Cinestage Theater, with a system that provided, then cleared, different aromas consistent with the scenes in the film.
- The Project Mercury data reduction plan was approved.
- Born:
  - Howie Long, American NFL football player, Hall of Fame inductee and commentator; in Somerville, Massachusetts
  - Miriam O'Callaghan, Irish media personality; in Foxrock
  - Nigella Lawson, British chef and writer; in London
  - Kari Jalonen, Finnish ice hockey player; in Oulu
- Died: Edward Orrick McDonnell, 68, United States Navy vice admiral and Medal of Honor recipient, was killed in the bombing of National Airlines Flight 2511.

== January 7, 1960 (Thursday) ==
- For the first time, a Polaris missile reached its target using its own inertial guidance system, rather than being directed from a ground station. The shot from Cape Canaveral came a few hours after President Eisenhower's final State of the Union speech, describing the new era of nuclear submarines armed with the Polaris missiles. "Impossible to destroy by surprise attack," said Ike, "they will become one of our most effective sentinels for peace."
- The Soviet Union announced that it would be testing a long-range rocket over an area in the North Pacific Ocean, and warned other nations not to send ships through a designated 280-mile (450 km) by 160-mile (260 km) area between January 15 and February 15.
- Representatives of NASA's Engineering and Contracts Division and Flight Systems Division (FSD) met to discuss future wind tunnel test needs for advanced Mercury projects.
- Died: Prince Ferdinand Pius, Duke of Calabria, 90, pretender to throne of Kingdom of Two Sicilies

== January 8, 1960 (Friday) ==
- David Cooper Nelson became the first convict to be executed in New Mexico's gas chamber, and the last. The legislature had replaced the electric chair with gas, and would later adopt lethal injection as its mode of capital punishment.
- Lee Harvey Oswald, an American defector to the Soviet Union, was personally welcomed by the Mayor of Minsk, given a free apartment, and then set up in a new job as a metal worker in the Byelorussian Radio and Television factory.
- The Los Angeles Rams sued the new American Football League and the Houston Oilers over the rights to Heisman Trophy winner Billy Cannon, who had signed with both teams.
- Born: Mohammed Javad Zarif, Iranian diplomat and politician, Minister of Foreign Affairs (2013-2021), Vice President for Strategic Affairs, in Tehran

== January 9, 1960 (Saturday) ==
- Kenneth Kaunda, the 35-year-old leader of the Zambian African National Congress, was released from prison on orders of the British Governor of Northern Rhodesia, Sir Evelyn Hone, a few weeks before Prime Minister Macmillan was scheduled to come to Lusaka. When Northern Rhodesia became the Republic of Zambia, Kaunda would become its first President.
- On his 47th birthday, Vice-President Richard M. Nixon became a candidate for the Republican nomination for the President of the United States, by giving his assent to the placing of his name on the ballot for primary elections in Oregon, New Hampshire and Ohio.
- Construction began on the Aswan High Dam on the Nile River in Egypt, as President Nasser of the United Arab Republic pushed a button to explode 10 tonnes (9.8 long tons; 11 short tons) of dynamite.
- Died: Elsie J. Oxenham, 79, British children's author, creator of the Abbey Girls series

== January 10, 1960 (Sunday) ==
- The United States would defend the Nationalist Chinese islands of Quemoy and Matsu from aggression by Communist China, U.S. Secretary of the Army Wilber M. Brucker said at a news conference in Taipei, marking a change in American policy. The U.S. treaty to defend the island of Taiwan from attack did not include the two islands in the Taiwan Strait. The question of whether the United States should go to war with China over the two islands would become an issue in the 1960 presidential campaign.
- Born: Brian Cowen, Taoiseach (Prime Minister of Ireland) and Leader of Fianna Fáil, from 2008 to 2011; in Clara, County Offaly

== January 11, 1960 (Monday) ==
- U.S. Senator Theodore F. Green of Rhode Island, at 92, the oldest person to ever serve in either house of Congress up to that time, announced that he would not run in 1960 for a fifth term. Green served from 1935 to 1961 and would die at age 98 in 1966. U.S. Senator Strom Thurmond would surpass Green's record in 1995, serving until his death in 2003 at 100 years old.
- Henry Lee Lucas, who would confess to more than 600 murders in 1985, then recant, took his first life, stabbing his 74-year-old mother, Viola, at her home in Tecumseh, Michigan. Sentenced to 40 years in prison, but released in 1970, Lucas then resumed killing, and was ultimately convicted of 11 homicides.
- NASA and the Western Electric Company signed a contract in the amount of $33,058,690 for construction and engineering of the Mercury tracking network.

== January 12, 1960 (Tuesday) ==
- After seven years, a state of emergency in the British East African colony of Kenya, was lifted by the Governor, Sir Patrick Renison. Proclaimed in 1952 after terrorism by the black nationalist group, the Mau Mau, the emergency regulations set curfews, restricted travel, and required the licensing of printing presses.
- Born:
  - Dominique Wilkins, French-born American NBA player; in Paris
  - Oliver Platt, Canadian actor; in Windsor, Ontario
- Died:
  - Nevil Shute, 60, English novelist known for On the Beach, died in Australia following a stroke.
  - "Sweet Daddy" Grace, 76, Los Angeles African-American evangelist

== January 13, 1960 (Wednesday) ==
- The first discussions were held in the White House to discuss covert action to overthrow Cuba's new revolutionary socialist government led by prime minister Fidel Castro. A special group, created by the National Security Council's order #5412, approved "Operation Zapata".
- The Soviet Ministry of Internal Affairs (MVD) was abolished, and replaced by separate agencies in the 15 republics.
- Born:
  - Sir Matthew Bourne, English choreographer known for his innovations and adaptations of classic ballets (including his 1995 restaging of Tchaikovsky's Swan Lake) and films; in Walthamstow
  - Goddess Bunny (stage name for Sandra "Sandie" Crisp), Transgender entertainer, drag queen, actress and model; in Santa Monica, California (died from COVID-19, 2021)

== January 14, 1960 (Thursday) ==
- The Reserve Bank of Australia, authorized by 1959 legislation, began operation, as did the ten-member Reserve Bank Board, which makes decisions on the monetary policy of Australia.
- John L. Lewis served his last day as President of the United Mine Workers of America after almost 40 years. He was succeeded by Thomas Kennedy.

== January 15, 1960 (Friday) ==
- The day after Soviet leader Nikita Khrushchev asked the Supreme Soviet of the USSR to formally approve his proposal to reduce the Soviet armed forces by nearly one-third, the 1,300 members in both houses gave their unanimous assent. The reduction, from 3,623,000 men to 2,423,000 men, had been announced by Khrushchev the day before in a speech to the joint session, with a plan to shift defense expenditures to nuclear weapons and missiles. "Should any madman launch an attack on our state or on other socialist states," Khrushchev said, "we would literally be able to wipe the country or countries that attack us off the face of the Earth."
- Eight Chicago policemen were arrested in early morning raids on their homes, and charged with burglary, and several carloads of stolen merchandise were seized from the homes. By the end of the month, 15 city cops had been indicted for what Mayor Daley called "the most disgraceful and shocking scandal in the police department's history." The arrests followed a revelation, by a 23-year-old burglar, that several members of the Chicago PD had assisted him in burglarizing businesses in areas they had been assigned to patrol.
- The U.S. Navy issued an operation plan for the Project Mercury recovery force, providing for procedures according to specified areas and for space recovery methods. Procedures for Mercury-Redstone and Mercury-Atlas missions were covered.

== January 16, 1960 (Saturday) ==
- Nobusuke Kishi, the Prime Minister of Japan, departed from Tokyo's Haneda Airport at 8:09 a.m., in order to sign an unpopular treaty with the United States on American soil, but not before avoiding a rioting crowd of at least 500 Zengakuren, leftist students who had occupied the airport in protest. Several thousand police were required to disperse the gathering.
- The village of Willowbrook, Illinois, was incorporated.

== January 17, 1960 (Sunday) ==
- It was announced that U.S. President Dwight D. Eisenhower would make a ten-day tour of the Soviet Union from June 10 to June 19, 1960, as the guest of Soviet First Secretary Nikita S. Khrushchev. The visit would never take place, and was called off after the U-2 incident in May.
- Born: Charles "Chili" Davis, Jamaican-born American Major League Baseball star and designated hitter; in Kingston

== January 18, 1960 (Monday) ==
- In the U.S., all 50 people on Capital Airlines Flight 20 were killed when the Vickers Viscount crashed near Holdcroft, Virginia, while en route from Washington to Norfolk. The 46 passengers and four crew were apparently killed on impact. The first persons on the scene heard no cries, and the aircraft was soon consumed by a fire that burned for five hours.
- Walter C. Williams, NASA's Associate Director of Project Mercury Operations, proposed the establishment of the "Mercury-Redstone Coordination Committee", with representatives from the Space Task Group, Air Force Ballistic Missile Division, Convair Astronautics, McDonnell Aircraft Corporation, and the Atlantic Missile Range to monitoring and coordinating activities related to Mercury program activities that used the PGM-11 Redstone missile as a launch vehicle. Williams also proposed that the Mercury-Atlas flight test group (which oversaw NASA use of the SM-65 Atlas missile for Mercury program activities) should serve as the official and standing coordination body.
- Major General Jacques Massu, the commander of the French Army in Algeria, criticized his boss in an interview with Hans Ulrich Kempski of the German newspaper Süddeutsche Zeitung. President Charles De Gaulle, who came into power with the Army's support in 1958, was outraged by Massu's statement that "Perhaps the Army made a mistake."

== January 19, 1960 (Tuesday) ==
- U.S. President Eisenhower and Japan's Prime Minister Kishi signed the Treaty of Mutual Cooperation and Security between the United States and Japan at the White House. Unpopular in Japan, the treaty was ratified there in June, and Kishi resigned soon afterward.
- Scandinavian Airlines Flight 871 crashed on its approach to Ankara, killing all 42 aboard.
- A final report was submitted to NASA by a group that had toured England in 1959 to evaluate products of British manufacturers for use in Project Mercury. The group had examined the SARAH beacon batteries that would later be used by NASA, as well as reviewing miniature indicators, time delay mechanisms, hydrogen-peroxide systems, and transducers.
- Born: Al Joyner, American track star who won an Olympic gold medal in 1984 in the triple jump; in East St. Louis, Illinois

== January 20, 1960 (Wednesday) ==
- The Soviet Union successfully test-fired the first ICBM, the R-7 Semyorka, demonstrating a range of at least 7,760 miles (12,490 km) when it reached a target area in the Pacific Ocean. The explosion on impact, at 8:05 p.m. Moscow time (1705 GMT, 12:05 p.m. EST), was observed by the crew of a Qantas aircraft.
- Born:
  - Will Wright, American designer of the computer game Sim City; in Atlanta
  - Jeff "Tain" Watts, American jazz drummer; in Pittsburgh

== January 21, 1960 (Thursday) ==
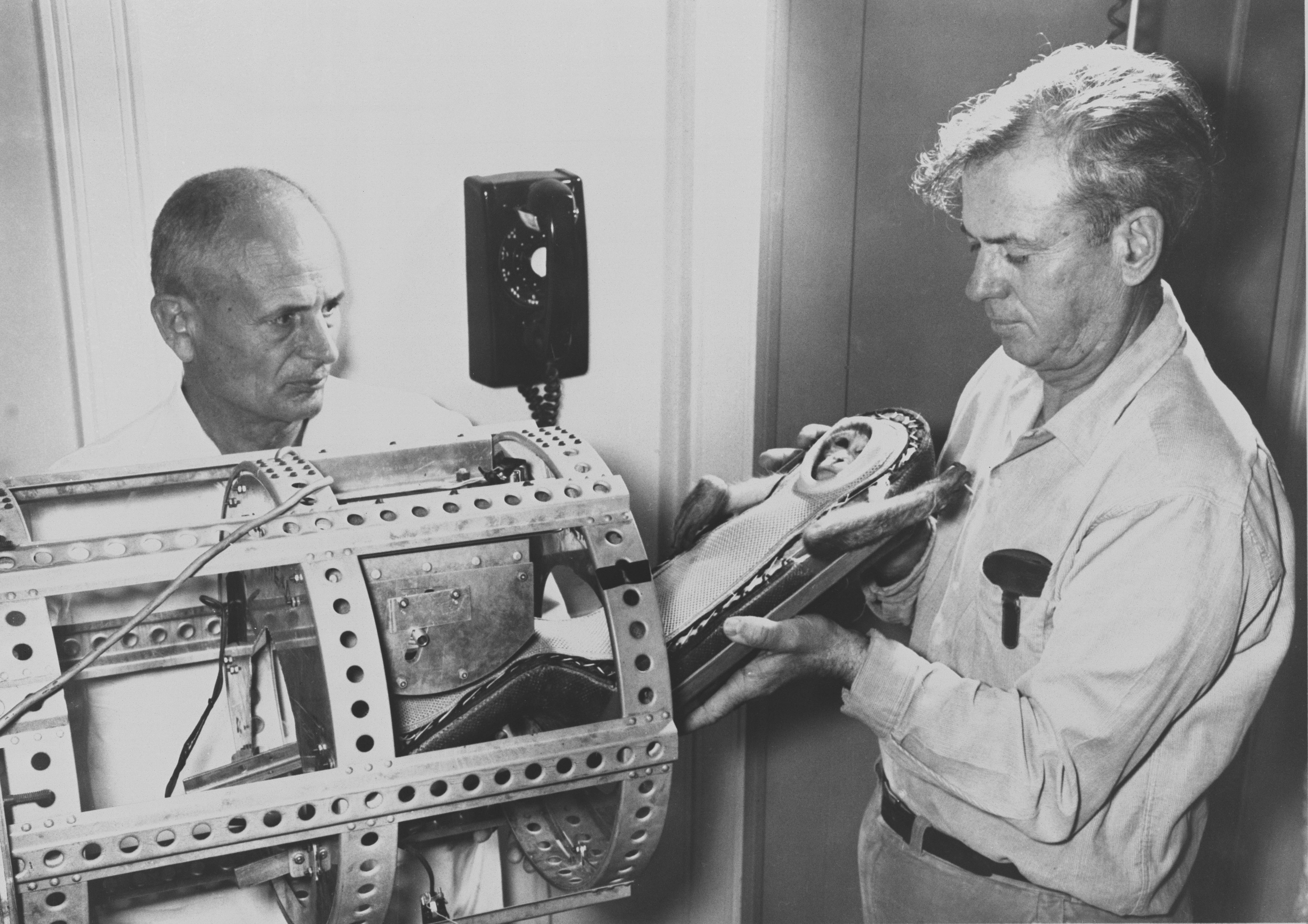
"Miss Sam" being placed in flight container in December 1959

- "Miss Sam", a rhesus monkey, was launched on board the rocket Little Joe 1B from Wallops Island, reaching an altitude of 48,900 feet (14,900 m) and a maximum speed of 2,021.6 miles per hour (3,253.4 km/h) before returning safely to Earth, clearing the way for human astronauts.
- In the third worst mine disaster in history, 437 coal miners were killed at the Coalbrook North Colliery at Coalbrook, South Africa, when a 3-square-kilometre (1.2 sq mi) section collapsed, filling the mine shaft with methane.
- Avianca Flight 671 from New York to Montego Bay, Jamaica, crashed and burned when its landing gear collapsed on landing, killing 37 of the 46 persons on board.
- At a meeting to draft fiscal year 1962 funding estimates for Project Mercury, the total purchase of Atlas launch vehicles was listed as 15, and the total purchase of Mercury spacecraft was listed as 26.
- Died: Wu Lien-teh, 80, Chinese physician who halted the pneumonic plague epidemic of 1910 in China

== January 22, 1960 (Friday) ==
- France's President de Gaulle fired Major General Massu from his post as commander of the troops in French Algeria, following Massu's critical interview. European Algerians were outraged by the firing, precipitating the "week of the barricades".
- At the Boston Garden, Sugar Ray Robinson lost his world middleweight boxing title in an upset to Paul Pender, a 29-year-old firefighter from Brookline, Massachusetts. Pender outpointed Robinson in fifteen rounds.
- Born: Michael Hutchence, Australian rock musician for INXS; in Sydney (d. 1997)

== January 23, 1960 (Saturday) ==
- Undersea explorer Jacques Piccard and U.S. Navy Lt. Don Walsh descended in the U.S. Navy bathyscaphe Trieste into the deepest depths of the ocean, reaching the bottom of the Mariana Trench in the Pacific at a depth of about 35,814 feet (10,916 m) or 6.79 miles below the surface.
- Born: Patrick de Gayardon, French skydiver and skysurfing pioneer; in Oullins, Rhône département (killed in skydiving accident, 1998)

== January 24, 1960 (Sunday) ==
- As many as 5,000 European residents of French Algeria, including members of the French home guard, sealed off parts of Algiers and then withdrew behind the barricades. In the crisis that followed, leaders of the French Army told Prime Minister Michel Debré that they would disregard orders to attack the insurgents. When the local police clashed with the demonstrators, 24 people were killed and 136 injured.
- The Democratic Socialist Party (Japan) was formed by Suehiro Nishio and 52 other members of Parliament who had formerly been in the Japan Socialist Party. The DSP lasted until 1994.
- Born: Rick Leventhal, Fox News Channel reporter; in Silver Spring, Maryland
- Died:
  - Ashihei Hino, 53, Japanese novelist, committed suicide with an overdose of sleeping pills.
  - Edwin Fischer, 73, Swiss classical pianist

== January 25, 1960 (Monday) ==
- Wilt Chamberlain set an NBA record that still stands, for "Most points, rookie, game", with 58 points for the Philadelphia Warriors against the Detroit Pistons, in Bethlehem, Pennsylvania. The record was tied, by Chamberlain, on February 21 of his rookie year.
- Belgium agreed to grant its African colony, in the Belgian Congo, independence, setting a date of June 30, 1960, and elections to be held in May.
- McDonnell Aircraft delivered the first production-type Mercury spacecraft to the Space Task Group at Langley Research Center in less than one year from the signing of the formal contract. This spacecraft was a structural shell and did not contain most of the internal systems that would be required for human spaceflight. After receipt, the Space Task Group instrumented the spacecraft and designated it for the uncrewed Mercury-Atlas 1 (MA-1) flight that would be launched on July 29, 1960.
- Died: Beno Gutenberg, 70, German-American seismologist who developed the Richter scale, died from cancer.

== January 26, 1960 (Tuesday) ==
- After 22 ballots to select the new National Football League Commissioner, Marshall Leahy had seven votes, Austin Gunsel had four, but neither candidate had the required 10 of 12 majority needed for the 12-team league. The compromise was the little-known general manager of the Los Angeles Rams, 33-year-old Pete Rozelle. Rozelle would go on to lead the NFL to become the most popular professional sports league in the United States.
- In Burnsville, West Virginia, Burnsville High School student Danny Heater set an interscholastic record for basketball, scoring 135 points in a 173–43 win over Widen, West Virginia's high school team.
- Born:
  - Freeway Rick Ross, American author and former drug lord best known for the drug empire he established in Los Angeles, California in the 1980s; in Terrell, Texas
  - Carol Yager, American woman who, at 1,603 pounds (727 kg), was the heaviest woman ever recorded; in Flint, Michigan (d. 1994)

== January 27, 1960 (Wednesday) ==
- A river of lava from the Kilauea Volcano spilled over the last earthen dike that had protected the village of Kapoho, Hawai'i, and began the destruction of the town, whose 300 residents had been evacuated. By Saturday, Kapoho was gone.
- Following Japan's signing of the new security treaty with the United States, the Soviet Union announced that it was cancelling plans to return the islands of Habomai and Shikotan, captured during World War II, to Japan.
- Construction began on the Baitul Mukarram mosque in Dhaka, East Pakistan. The structure, designed by Abdul Hussain Thariani, is now the National Mosque of Bangladesh.
- Thirty-one people were trampled to death in Seoul, South Korea, when a crowd surged forward to catch a train.

== January 28, 1960 (Thursday) ==
- The 12-team NFL expanded for the first time since 1949, awarding the franchise for the Dallas Cowboys for 1960, and for the Minnesota Vikings for 1961.
- China and Burma (now Myanmar) signed an agreement specifying the boundary between the two nations.
- Died: Zora Neale Hurston, 69, African-American author who would attain posthumous fame in the 1970s

== January 29, 1960 (Friday) ==
- Facing a challenge from rebelling European settlers in French Algeria, France's President Charles de Gaulle went on television in his Army uniform, in order, he said, "to stress that I am speaking as General de Gaulle as well as chief of state". Having announced before that the future of French territory in Algeria would be left to the Algerian Arab majority, de Gaulle emphasized that he would not yield to Europeans "who dream of being usurpers". Following the speech, the French Army ended speculation about whether they would side with the Algerian Europeans against the Paris government, and ordered all home guardsmen, inside the barricades, to report to their headquarters. When the order was disobeyed, the Army moved in to end the rebellion.
- Born:
  - Matthew Ashford, American soap opera actor known for Days of Our Lives; in Davenport, Iowa
  - Gia Carangi, American supermodel and AIDS sufferer; in Philadelphia (d. 1986)
  - Greg Louganis, American diver, 1984 and 1988 Olympic gold medalist; in El Cajon, California

== January 30, 1960 (Saturday) ==
- The American Football League filled out its eight teams by voting on where to place the franchise that had formerly been reserved for Minneapolis. Although a majority preferred to place an AFL team in Atlanta, the owners agreed that a second California team was needed, and the team became the Oakland Raiders (later the Los Angeles Raiders, now the Las Vegas Raiders).
- Died: J. C. Kumarappa, 68, Indian economist and father of "Gandhian economics"

== January 31, 1960 (Sunday) ==
- Joseph McNeill, a 17-year-old college freshman, was turned away by a waitress with the words, "We don't serve Negroes," when he tried to get something to eat at the bus terminal in Greensboro, North Carolina. When he talked about it with three friends at North Carolina Agricultural and Technical College, the four African-American students decided that they would take a stand against segregation. The next day, the four would sit down at the Woolworth's Department Store lunch counter and refuse to get up until they were served, and the "sit-in" was created as a form of civil disobedience.
- At Tawfiq, a skirmish between soldiers from Israel and Syria (at that time, part of the United Arab Republic with Egypt) left 12 Syrians and 7 Israelis dead. UAR President Gamal Abdel Nasser sent Egyptian troops back into the Sinai in response.
- Six chimpanzees were certified as being trained and ready to be launched on Project Mercury space missions. At the same time, other chimpanzees were being shipped from Africa to enter NASA's animal training program.
