= Disappearance of Mary Flanagan =

1959 missing person case in England

Mary Flanagan
- Flanagan from a family photograph
- Born: 9 June 1943; London, England
- Disappeared: 31 December 1959 (aged 16); West Ham, London, England
- Status: Missing for 66 years, 8 months and 9 days

On 31 December 1959, Mary Flanagan (born 9 June 1943) disappeared after leaving her family home in West Ham, East London. She was last seen approaching West Ham tube station and was due to attend her employer's New Year's Eve party at the Tate & Lyle sugar refinery in Silvertown. The BBC has described her case as "the oldest open case on the books of the Metropolitan Police". (Note: As of 18 December 2013, the BBC described Mary Flanagan's case as "the oldest open case on the books of the Metropolitan Police".)

== Background ==
Mary Flanagan was born in London on 9 June 1943 into a Catholic family of Irish descent; her father's family was from County Westmeath. She had two sisters, Eileen and Brenda, and a brother named Kevin. The family lived at Wallace Road, E15 at the time of her disappearance. Flanagan attended Holbrook Road Secondary School, and at the time of her disappearance she was working at the large Tate & Lyle sugar refinery in Silvertown. She also occasionally worked at an opticians in Stratford, as well as volunteered with the Blind Association.

=== Events prior to the disappearance ===
Members of Flanagan's family, discussing her disappearance in 2013, suggested that she may have eloped with a man she had been seen with frequently in the last few weeks of 1959. He was supposedly another Irish immigrant and may have worked in the Merchant Navy, although police say they have never been able to trace such a man. He was introduced to her as "Tom" by her father, and, under one name or another, undoubtedly existed; at the time, he appeared to be in his early twenties.

She was on the police files and on their noticeboard until she was 21. Then they told us as she had reached the age of consent. If she was found they couldn't force her to come home.

— Brenda Harris née Flanagan speaking to the BBC.

He may have been Mary's fiancé. Information on him is sparse, however, and he has also been described as being an Irish labourer; even his surname is uncertain. He is most commonly referred to as McGinty, although it could also have been McEntee or even McGuinness. The Merchant Navy had no record of a Tom McGinty working in their service.

Her family have suggested that she could have been pregnant, and disappeared because of that, as it would have been "a major thing for a 16-year-old Catholic to tell her parents" according to contemporary social norms. One of Mary Flanagan's last known interactions with her boyfriend was later reported by her sister Brenda as being a bitter argument. This had been caused by Mary’s discovery that, although McGinty claimed to be living with his landlady, he actually lived with his mother. This lie, said Brenda, had distressed Mary sufficiently to cause her to oversleep on the morning of 31 December. This followed an argument, with "raised voices", between Mary, McGinty and Mr Flanagan, following which "Mary went to bed in tears, telling her sisters she planned to end the relationship" with McGinty.

== Disappearance ==
On the day of her disappearance she was due to attend her employer's New Year's Eve party, which was held annually in the Silvertown plant. The last known sighting of her was approaching West Ham tube station.

Apart from interviewing Mary’s family, officers in the 60s would have relied on old-fashioned policing to find her including putting up posters around the community, speaking to her family and friends, and roaming the streets with her picture.

The following day, her family realised she had not come home the preceding evening, and Mr. and Mrs. Flanagan visited the sugar refinery in search of information. In a curious twist, they were informed that she had actually been absent from work for the previous fortnight. For their part, Tate and Lyle had assumed that she was off sick at the time. A search of the local area was made by both locals and the police, and the local papers provided some publicity for the case; however, it is likely to have been seen as merely a "typical teenage runaway" of the time.

=== Case re-opened, 2013 ===
Police continued to check the National Insurance database, in 1983 and in subsequent years, but reported that her number has never been used for employment purposes since. In 2013, on her seventieth birthday, the Metropolitan Police and the local Missing Persons Unit in Newham re-opened her case for examination. The investigating officer described the case as a "complete one-off," and it has been used as an example of the changes that policing methods have undergone over subsequent years: from knocking on doors in the community in 1960s, to accessing Facebook profiles in the 2000s. Police particularly appealed for information on Tom McGinty. In January 2017, the charity Missing People commissioned a new age progressed image of Mary from UK forensic artist Tim Widden.

== See also ==
- List of people who disappeared mysteriously: 1910–1990
