= Minamata disease compensation agreements of 1959 =

The Minamata disease compensation agreements of 1959 were agreed between the polluting Chisso company and representative groups of fishermen and Minamata disease patients who had been affected by mercury pollution. The agreements and their formation shared a number of common characteristics. They were formulated outside the legal system, by ad-hoc mediation committees specially established for the purpose. Members of the committees and the final agreements were weighted in favour of Chisso and all included punitive clauses that the groups could make no future claims for compensation against the company. The agreements were for "sympathy money" rather than compensation, a term which allowed the company to avoid accepting responsibility.

== Compensation of fishermen ==
Ever since 1908 when Chisso opened the factory in Minamata wastewater had been dumped into the seas around Minamata, particularly into Minamata Bay via the waste canal outlet in Hyakken Harbour. Damage to fisheries was inevitable and the Minamata Fishing Cooperative had demanded compensation from the company on two occasions previous to the outbreak of Minamata disease. After direct negotiations in 1926 the company agreed to pay "sympathy money" to the cooperative of JPY1,500 (USD704). By using the term "sympathy money" (見舞い金, mimaikin) the company avoided accepting responsibility for the damage and sought to prevent further claims by including a clause in the agreement that the cooperative would "never again lodge complaints" against Chisso. This pattern of denial of responsibility and the inclusion of punitive clauses repeated itself again and again in Chisso's dealings with complainants. The pollution continued unabated and another agreement was signed in 1943. This time the cooperative was paid JPY152,500 in compensation for future and past damage to fishing. The cooperative was also forced to acknowledge Chisso's "importance to the prosperity of Minamata" and "the need to cooperate so as not to harm its operations", indicating the unequal nature of the agreement.

Fishing in Minamata Bay (W. E. Smith)

=== The Minamata Fishing Cooperative ===
By the time of the outbreak of Minamata disease the fishing situation had become critical. From 1953 to 1957 the fish catch in Minamata had declined by a staggering 91%. In 1956, the Kumamoto prefectural government had attempted to limit the spread of the disease by banning the sale of fish caught from Minamata Bay, but did not issue and all-out ban. This left fishermen with fish they could not sell, but no financial assistance to compensate their losses. In September 1958 the Minamata Fishing Cooperative petitioned the prefecture to ban fishing completely so that their members might be properly compensated under the Fisheries Law and Food Sanitation Act. The government did not respond and only advised the fishermen against consumption of the fish and shellfish they caught from the bay. However, with no source of income, many fishermen were left with no choice but to eat the suspect fish they caught. In fact, throughout the history of the Minamata disease problem, the catching of fish from Minamata Bay has never been legally prohibited.

Despite the ban on the sale of contaminated fish, there was still widespread suspicion amongst local people that fish caught in the Minamata area was unsafe and by June 1959 several fish shops had gone out of business from plummeting demand. Desperate, and with no assistance from government, the cooperative was forced into direct negotiations with the company. On 6 August 400 members of the cooperative marched on the factory and in a hostile atmosphere met with factory manager Eiichi Nishida. The fishermen's demand for the cleanup of Minamata Bay, the installation of wastewater treatment facilities and JPY100 million (USD278,000) was met with an offer of "emergency sympathy money" to the value of JPY500,000 (USD1,390) and a promise to consult with the company's head office in Tokyo.

Fishermen from the cooperative again forced their way into the factory on 12 August to continue negotiations. No agreement could be reached but the two sides did manage to agree to a joint inspection of fishing conditions in Minamata Bay, followed by further talks on 17 August. After this inspection Chisso admitted that fishing was impossible in some areas and made a final offer of JPY13 million (USD36,100). This paltry sum incensed the fishermen. Violence broke out, riot police were called and Nishida and other company employees were effectively held hostage in the factory building. Only after Mayor Todomu Nakamura agreed to mediate between the two sides did the fishermen leave the factory grounds. The mediation committee formed by Mayor Nakamura was stacked heavily in Chisso's favour and presented a decision on 26 August. The company would pay JPY20 million (USD55,600) directly to the cooperative and set up a JPY15 million (USD41,700) fund to promote the recovery of fishing. The proposal was qualified with the ultimatum that if either side rejected, the committee would stop mediation completely. On 29 August the fishing cooperative delivered its response: "In order to end the anxiety of the citizens, we swallow our tears and accept". The company also agreed and the first compensation agreement between Chisso and fisherman was complete.

=== The Kumamoto Prefectural Alliance of Fishing Cooperatives ===
To the company's disappointment, this first agreement did not bring an end to problems with fishermen. Since Chisso had switched the wastewater output from Minamata Bay to the mouth of Minamata River in September 1958 the environmental damage had spread even further up and down the Shiranui Sea. Cats had started to die in Ashikita to the north and in Izumi to the south of Minamata and new Minamata disease patients were also appearing. The pollution was having a widespread effect on fishing catches and fish sales as people's confidence in the safety of their food evaporated. This drove the Kumamoto Prefectural Alliance of Fishing Cooperatives to take action of a similar pattern to that taken by the Minamata Fishing Alliance earlier in the year, but on a larger scale. On 17 October, 1,500 fishermen from the alliance descended on the factory demanding direct negotiations with Chisso. When company officials refused, the fishermen forced their way into the factory and attacked the security office, breaking windows and injuring seven guards. Alliance president Ushita Murakami delivered their demands to company manager Nishida, who promised a prompt reply. When the response came, the company said that since the factory's waste had still not been proven as the cause of Minamata disease, and it could offer the fishermen nothing.

Unsatisfied, Murakami and followers travelled to Tokyo and met with officials of numerous government departments to outline their plight. He managed to secure a promise from members of the Diet that they would visit Minamata to investigate the situation. When the Diet party arrived in Minamata on 2 November they were met by a crowd of 4,000 demonstrators (including fishermen and disease victims groups alike) outside the Municipal Hospital. The crowd was extremely respectful to the Diet members and pleaded with them for help. The members thanked the demonstrators for bringing the issue to the attention of the national government and promised they would do all they could.

Emboldened after their demonstration at the hospital, the alliance fishermen marched on the factory to again demand negotiations. The company refused and the fishermen forced their way in and rioted, attacking many buildings and significantly damaging company property. Riot police arrived and serious fighting continued sporadically for the rest of the day until the fishermen dispersed around 9 pm. Injuries included 30-40 fishermen, two company employees, factory manager Nishida himself, 64 policemen and the chief of police. Damages to company property amounted to JPY10 million (USD27,800). Before the riot the Minamata disease issue had been skirted by the national media and had been chiefly a local issue. The violent riot however was covered widely in the national media and for the first time since the discovery of the disease in 1956 the issue of Minamata disease had nationwide coverage.

A mediation committee headed by Kumamoto Prefecture Governor Hirosaku Teramoto was formed to hammer out a solution. At a meeting on 2 December the prefectural fishing alliance outlined their demands: compensation of JPY2.5 billion (USD6.9 million) for damage to fishing since 1953, the temporary closure of the factory and removal of toxic sludge. The committee then met company executives, including Chisso president Kiichi Yoshioka, who responded with an offer that amounted to "nearly zero". After weeks of wrangling the fishing alliance reduced its demands to JPY980 million (USD2.7 million) and Chisso, under increasing pressure from all sides, relaxed its position. The proposed agreement (presented with the ultimatum of no further mediation from the committee should it be rejected, as previously) called for the immediate installation of wastewater treatment facilities, JPY35 million compensation to be paid to the alliance (JPY10 million of which would be deducted to cover the damage caused in the 2 November riots) and a JPY65 million fund for the recovery of the fishing industry. The agreement also included a clause that the alliance could never demand further compensation, even if the factory's waste was proven to be the cause of the damage. The agreement was accepted by both sides on 17 December.

== Compensation of victims ==
In 1959, the victims of Minamata disease and their families were in a much weaker position than the fisherman who had extracted at least some "sympathy money" from Chisso. The only patients' organisation present at the time of the fishermen's agreements was the Minamata Disease Patients Families Mutual Aid Society, which had only been established in August 1957. They were much fewer in number (in November 1959 the society only represented the 58 families of 78 patients) and the membership of the society was more divided than the relatively united fishermen. One factor driving the division of the patients was the discrimination and ostracism some families were experiencing in the Minamata community. Local people, who were naturally averse to uncleanliness and disease, felt that the company (and their city that depended upon it) was facing economic ruin under the pressure of the various groups making demands of it. Even fishermen, who were fellow victims of the company's pollution, discriminated against disease victims because they were stoking fears that prevented the sale of their fish. To some patients this ostracism from the community represented a greater fear than the disease itself.

In a similar fashion to the fishermen's associations, the Mutual Aid Society began by petitioning the city and prefectural governments and visited Kumamoto city on 21 November. When their petitions produced no results, the society approached Chisso directly and demanded compensation of JPY234 million (USD650,000) – JPY3 million (USD8,300) per person. On 28 November the company replied that the link between the factory's wastewater and Minamata disease had not been proven and could, therefore, offer them nothing but an expression of sympathy. The society began a sit-in at the company gates, which was to last a whole month.

Around 50 members of the society travelled to Kumamoto on 1 December and made a request to Governor Teramoto to include the patients' request for compensation with the mediation that was ongoing with the prefectural fishing alliance. He agreed to consult with the company and when the mediation committee presented its deal to the fishing alliance on 16 December, it also presented a proposal for "sympathy" payments to the Mutual Aid Society, even though no representatives had been present on the mediation committee. The proposal amounted to a total compensation package of JPY74 million. The money would be allocated to patients certified by a committee to be established by the Ministry of Health and Welfare as follows: adult patients would receive JPY100,000 (USD278) and children JPY10,000 (USD28) per year; families of dead patients would receive a JPY320,000 (USD889) payment. Society leader Eizō Watanabe agreed that the overall level of compensation was acceptable but rejected the plan over the staggered schedule of payments and the very small sum being offered for child victims.

The mediation committee reconvened on 25 December and agreed to increase the child payments to JPY30,000 (USD83) per child. The Mutual Aid Society held a vote of its members but the agreement was rejected by a single vote. Society leader Watanabe offered his resignation in protest but when another vote was held on 27 December members accepted the agreement and his resignation was withdrawn. As usual, the agreement did not admit responsibility for Minamata disease. The payments were "sympathy money" and the agreement included a clause that, "Even if in the future it is determined that the cause of Minamata disease is the factory's wastewater, [the patients] will make absolutely no further demands for compensation", along with an extra clause that, "If in the future it is determined that the cause of Minamata disease is not the factory's wastewater, the company shall end payments at the end of that month." The final agreement was accepted by both sides on 29 December 1959.
