= May 1959 =

Month of 1959

<<	May 1959					>>
Su	Mo	Tu	We	Th	Fr	Sa
					1	2
3	4	5	6	7	8	9
10	11	12	13	14	15	16
17	18	19	20	21	22	23
24	25	26	27	28	29	30
31

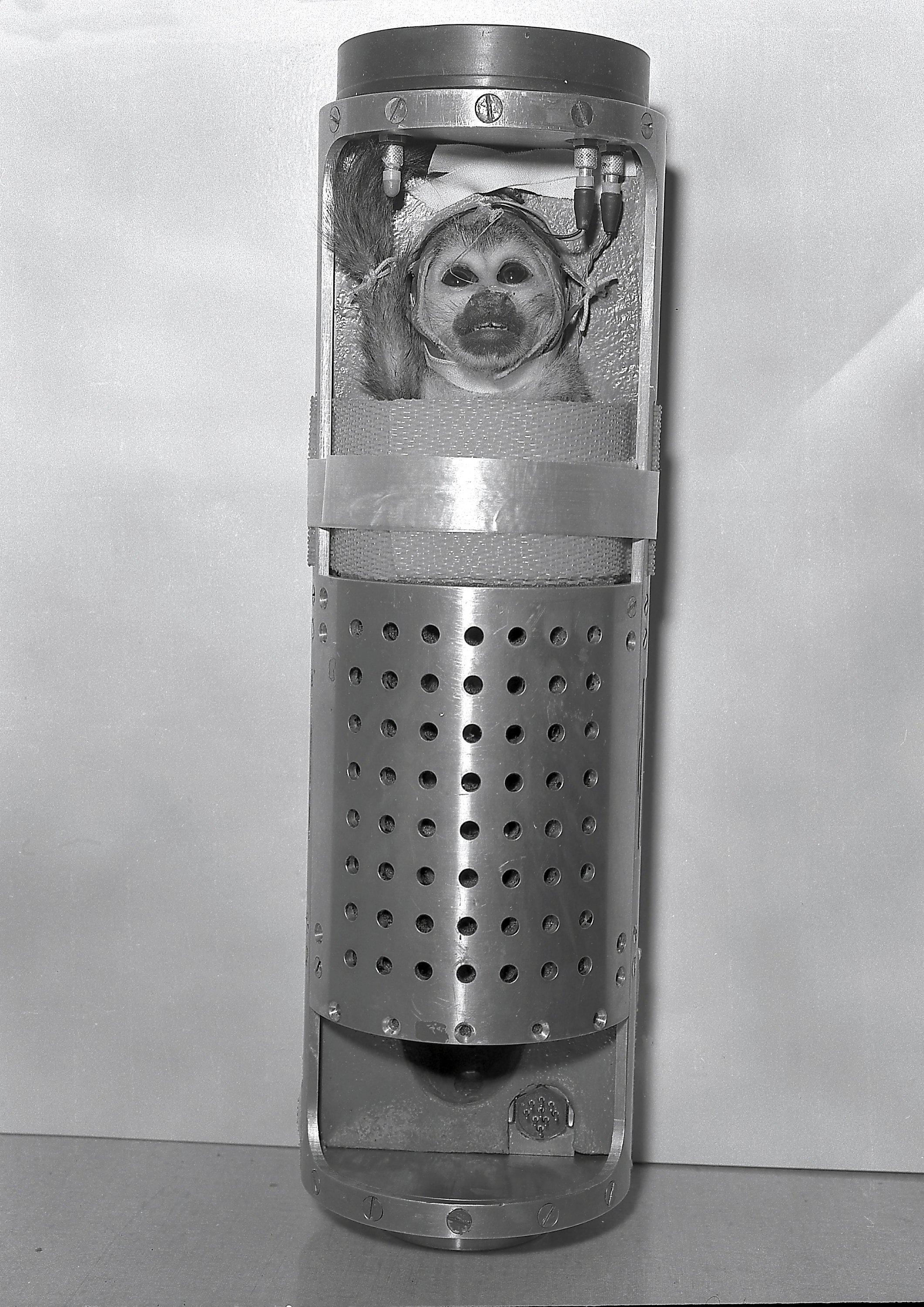
May 28, 1959: Spider monkey Miss Baker...

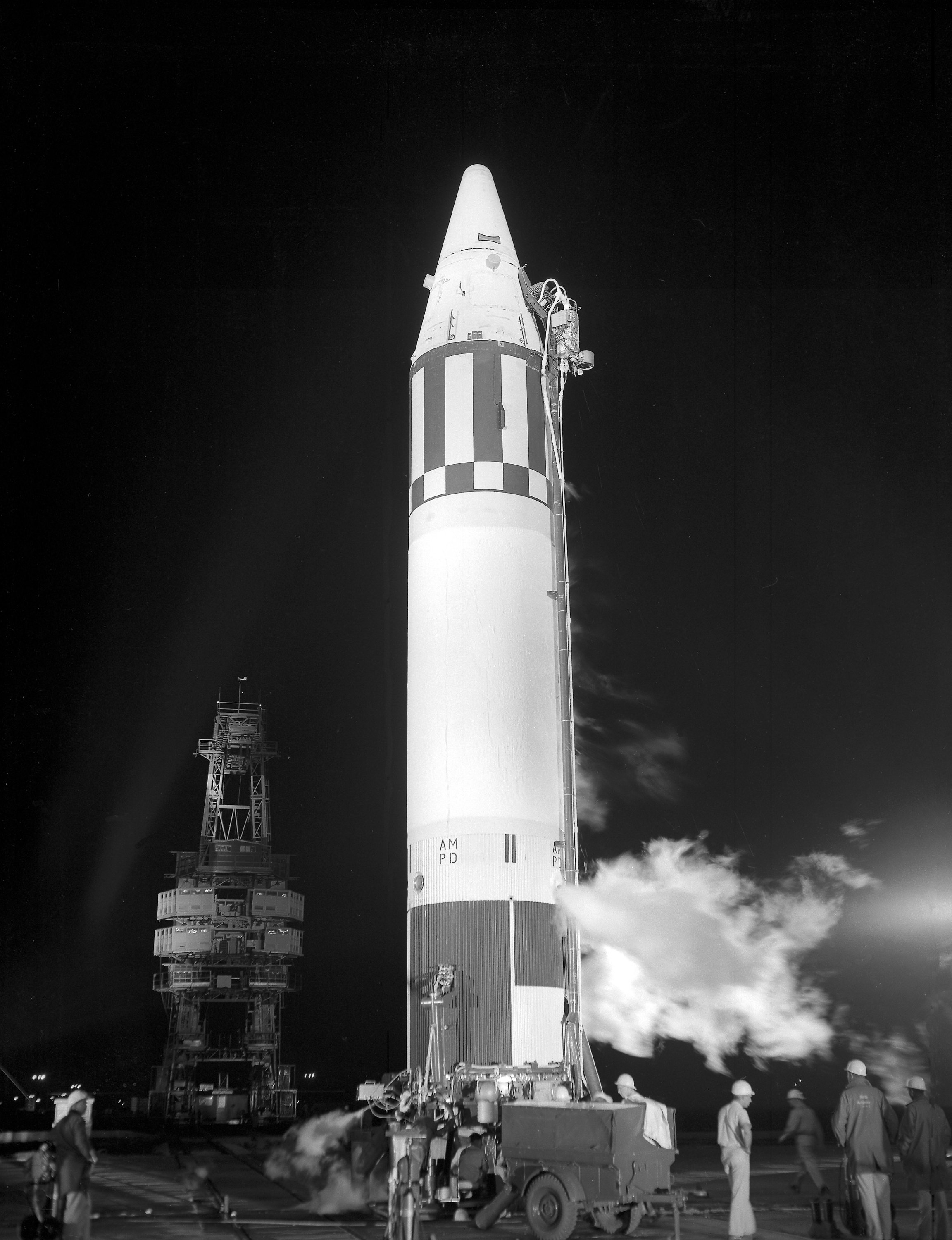
... launched into outer space with rhesus monkey Miss Able

The following events occurred in May 1959:

== May 1, 1959 (Friday) ==
- W. E. B. Du Bois was awarded the Lenin Peace Prize during his visit to Moscow.
- Ghana's President Kwame Nkrumah and Guinea's President Sekou Toure announced the merger of their two nations into the Union of African States, which later grew to include Mali in 1961. The Union was dissolved in 1963 after the creation of the Organization of African Unity.
- Jean Hoerni filed a patent application (No. 3,064,167) for the planar process under the name "method of protecting exposed p-n junctions at the surface of silicon transistors by oxide masking technique". The process, which protected the transistor from contamination, made mass production of the transistors feasible, and has been called "after the invention of the junction transistor, the most important invention of microelectronics".
- The NASA spaceflight center in Greenbelt, Maryland, was named for Robert H. Goddard.
- A Little Joe Project Coordination Meeting, attended by personnel from Space Task Group, McDonnell, and Wallops Island, was held for the first time. The purpose of the meeting was to determine the status of various developmental phases and whether or not proper coordination was being effected with other related projects in the Mercury program (Big Joe, Mercury-Atlas, Mercury-Redstone, and Mercury-Jupiter). The important factor with regard to the latter item was whether or not a reasonable launch schedule could be established and maintained.

== May 2, 1959 (Saturday) ==
- Four white men in Tallahassee, Florida, kidnapped and raped a black woman, Betty Jean Owens, near the campus of Florida A & M University, beginning a case that attracted nationwide attention. Ultimately, an all-white jury convicted the four men, and on June 22, Judge W. May Walker sentenced them to life in prison.
- Jerry Unser Jr. was fatally injured while practicing for the Indianapolis 500. Unser's car struck a retaining wall at 133 miles per hour (214 km/h) and burst into flame, and he died 15 days later from his burns. As a result, Indy racing officials required all drivers to wear fire-resistant suits in practice and in competition.

== May 3, 1959 (Sunday) ==
- A body was found in the shallow waters of a slough (wetland) of the Columbia River near Camas, Washington, and soon confirmed to be that of 10-year-old Susan Martin, one of five members of a Portland, Oregon, family that had vanished almost five months earlier. On December 7, 1958, Ken and Barbara Martin, and their three daughters, had left home to buy a Christmas tree, and never returned. The mystery garnered national attention. The next day, the body of 12-year-old Virginia Martin was found at the Bonneville Dam. No trace of the other three victims was ever located, nor was their car, a red and white station wagon. After more than sixty years, the mystery of what happened to the Martin family would remain unsolved.

== May 4, 1959 (Monday) ==
- The first Grammy Awards were bestowed by the National Academy of Recording Arts and Sciences, in simultaneous ceremonies held at the Beverly Hilton Hotel in Beverly Hills, California, and the Park Sheraton Hotel in New York City. The Music from Peter Gunn, by Henry Mancini, was album of the year, and Domenico Modugno's Volare (officially Nel blu, dipinto di blu) was song of the year.The Champs' Tequila won the award for best rhythm & blues performance. "Grammy" is an abbreviation for the Gramophone Award.
- On a day in which a white man was exonerated from charges of rape of a black woman, and a black man convicted of rape of a white woman, Robert Williams of the NAACP declared in Monroe, North Carolina, "We must meet violence with violence".
- In a rare appearance before Congress, former U.S. President Harry S. Truman testified in favor of a repeal of the two-terms amendment. "You don't have to be very smart to know that an officeholder who is not eligible for re-election loses a lot of influence."

== May 5, 1959 (Tuesday) ==
- Potter Stewart was confirmed as a justice of the United States Supreme Court by a vote of 70–17. On the same day, Roland Ritchie was appointed to the Supreme Court of Canada. Both served on their nation's highest courts for more than 20 years. Stewart retired in 1981 and Ritchie in 1984.
- The United States signed an agreement with West Germany to share classified information about American nuclear weapons and to train German personnel in the operation of those weapons.
- After three of the six members of the school board of Little Rock, Arkansas, walked out, the remaining three, all segregationists, ordered the firing of 44 teachers who had supported integration, and reassigned School Superintendent Terrell E. Powell to a school principal's job.
- Born:
  - Peter Molyneux, British game programmer, in Guildford, England
  - Brian Williams, anchorman for NBC Nightly News, in Elmira, New York
- Died: Carlos Saavedra Lamas, 80, Argentine politician, 1936 Nobel Peace Prize laureate

== May 6, 1959 (Wednesday) ==
- South Vietnam's President Ngô Đình Diệm promulgated "Law 10/59" to combat opposition by the communist Viet Cong. Under Article I, the death penalty could be invoked for murder and for other crimes, including theft of farm implements, and under Article III, a person found guilty of belonging to "an organization designed to help to prepare or perpetrate" such crimes could be executed. Death was by beheading, and traveling military tribunals brought guillotines along to carry out sentences.
- The Armed Forces Special Weapons Project, which oversaw the American nuclear arsenal, was reorganized as DASA, the Defense Atomic Support Agency. Later renamed the Defense Nuclear Agency (1971) and then the Defense Special Weapons Agency (1996), the former DASA is now part of the Defense Threat Reduction Agency.
- Pigs were eliminated as Little Joe flight test subjects when studies disclosed that they could not survive long periods of time on their backs. However, McDonnell did use a pig, "Gentle Bess," to test the impact crushable support, and the test was successful.

== May 7, 1959 (Thursday) ==
- English scientist and novelist C. P. Snow delivered an influential Rede Lecture on The Two Cultures, concerning a perceived breakdown of communication between the sciences and humanities, in the Senate House, University of Cambridge (U.K.)
- The largest crowd ever to attend a Major League Baseball game up that time —93,103—turned out for an exhibition between the NL Dodgers and the AL Yankees (who won 6–2), at Memorial Coliseum in Los Angeles, for Roy Campanella Night, to honor the Dodgers catcher who had been paralyzed in a car crash the year before. The record stood for nearly half a century, until March 29, 2008, in another exhibition game at the L.A. Coliseum, when 115,300 came out for a charity game between the Dodgers and the Red Sox (who won 7–4). In a game that did count, Stan Musial of the Cardinals hit his 400th home run in a 4–3 win over the visiting Cubs.
- Two burglars broke into the apartment of socialite Mary G. Roebling at the Hotel Hildebrecht in Trenton, New Jersey, loaded nearly one million dollars' worth of gems and furs into a cardboard box and rode down the hotel elevator for their getaway—where New York City police were waiting for them. The police had been following the pair and their driver since February 2, after being tipped off.

== May 8, 1959 (Friday) ==
- The Egyptian tour boat Dandara sank in the Nile River near Qalyub, drowning 150 of the 300 people on board. The overloaded boat, ferrying agricultural engineers and their families to a picnic, was only 6 yards (5.5 m) from shore when a sudden leak caused it to founder in water 50 feet (15 m) deep, and then to capsize. Most of the victims were women and children, trapped below decks. The skipper of the ship was arrested for negligence.
- At the Cannes Film Festival, Hiroshima mon amour, directed by Alain Resnais, was excluded from the contest because of its pacifist message. The success of the Resnais movie and of Francois Truffaut’s The 400 blows (presented in competition May 4) marked the beginning of the French New Wave.
- The first Little Caesars pizza restaurant was opened. Mike Ilitch and his wife Marian began the chain with a store in Garden City, Michigan.
- An F-84 jet fighter crashed into a backyard at Northville, Michigan, injuring two children, after the pilot had ejected.
- The last 30 people were evicted from Chavez Ravine in Los Angeles under court order, and their homes were bulldozed to make way for Dodger Stadium.
- Matvei Zakharov was made a Marshal of the Soviet Union.
- Born: Kevin McCloud, British designer and television presenter for the show Grand Designs; in Bedfordshire
- Died: Donald A. Quarles, 64, the Deputy U.S. Secretary of Defense, died of a heart attack. Quarles had been expected to succeed Neil McElroy later in the year as Defense Secretary.

== May 9, 1959 (Saturday) ==
- The legislature for Eritrea voted to become part of Ethiopia, with the President being redesignated as "Chief of the Eritrean Administration under Haile Selassie, Emperor of Ethiopia".
- Alfred H. Fuller, President of the Fuller Brush Company and the son of company founder Alfred C. Fuller, died, along with his wife, when a blown rear tire crashed their Mercedes-Benz near Hawthorne, Nevada.

== May 10, 1959 (Sunday) ==
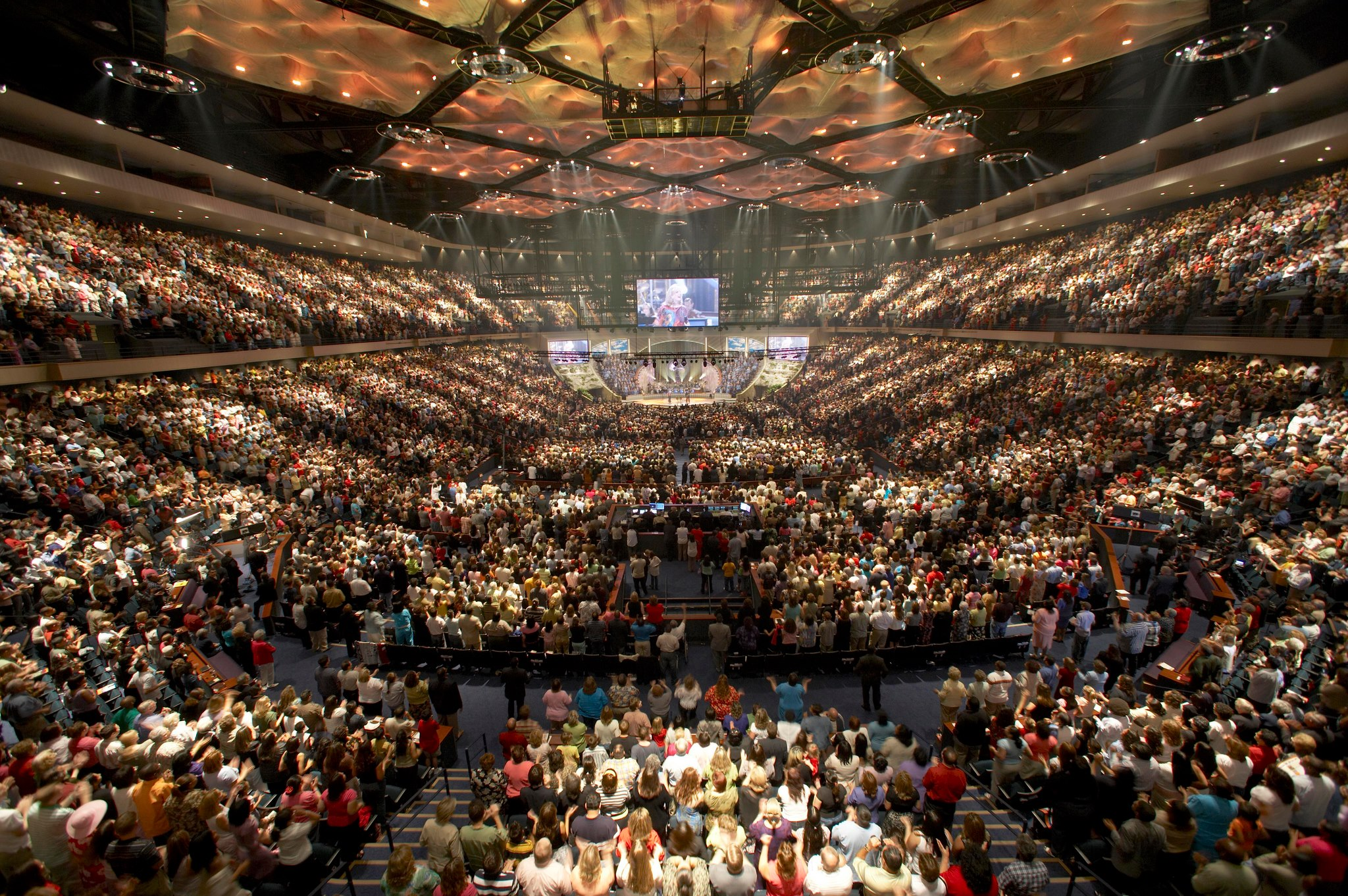
A service at the largest American megachurch, founded in 1959.

- Lakewood Church, now the largest megachurch in the United States, with 43,500 worshipers per week in 2018 and more than 52,000 reported by 2026., was founded as Lakewood Baptist Church by future televangelist John Osteen and his wife Dolores "Dodie" Osteen with a service in a tent, and would then move into a former feed store in northeast Houston in Texas. The Osteens changed the church in 1961 to a nondenominational Christian house of worship and build it into a megachurch with 700 seats in 1972 and 8,000 in 1988. After John's 1999 death, his youngest son, televangelist Joel Osteen would build the church congregation into more than 50,000 weekly attendees as of 2026 at regular services at the former Compaq Center pro basketball arena (with seats for 16,800 for each service), as well as reaching millions of people on television and online.
- Azef Youssef Atta was enthroned at Alexandria in Egypt, as Pope Pope Cyril VI of the Coptic Orthodox Church and its four million adherents in Egypt.. He would be the spiritual leader of the Coptic Christians until his death on March 9, 1971.
- Elections were held in Austria for all 185 seats of the Nationalrat, the lower house of the Austrian parliament. While no party won the 93 seats needed for a majority, the coalition of the Volkspartei (ÖVP) of Chancellor Julius Raab (79 seats) and the Sozialdemokratische (SPÖ) of Vice Chancellor Bruno Pittermann (78 seats) combined for 157 seats.

== May 11, 1959 (Monday) ==
- Nine clubs from the Transvaal and three from Natal province formed the first professional soccer football league in South Africa. It was designated by its members as the National Football League. In accordance with the apartheid laws in effect at the time, the South African NFL was limited to white players only and would play its first matches on July 4. The original 12 members were Durban City and Durban United (Durban); Benoni United, Brakpan United, Germiston Callies (East Rand); Northern United, Rangers Johannesburg and Southern Park (Johannesburg); Maritzburg Celtic (Pietermaritzburg); Pretoria City and Arcadia Shepherds (Pretoria); and Randfontein (West Rand). In 1978, the all-white NFL would merge with the all-nonwhite National Professional Soccer League (NPSL) under the NPSL name.
- The foreign ministers of Britain, France, the Soviet Union and the United States met in Geneva for a 17-day conference on the reunification of Germany, without coming to an agreement.
- A NASA policy concerning Mercury astronauts was issued. The astronauts were subject to the regulations and directives of NASA, and information of unclassified nature reported by the astronauts would be disseminated to the public.

== May 12, 1959 (Tuesday) ==
- Capital Airlines Flight 75, a Vickers Viscount turboprop flying from New York to Atlanta, disintegrated at an altitude of 5,000 feet (1,500 m) after encountering severe turbulence, crashing near Chase, Maryland, at 4:16 p.m., killing all 31 people on board. Less than an hour earlier, two of the 44 people on Capital Airlines Flight 983 from Buffalo to Atlanta were killed when the Lockheed Constellation plane slid down a 200-foot (61 m) embankment after skidded off the runway during a stop in Charleston, West Virginia. The pair of disasters marked the first time that two planes from the same airline had crashed on the same day.
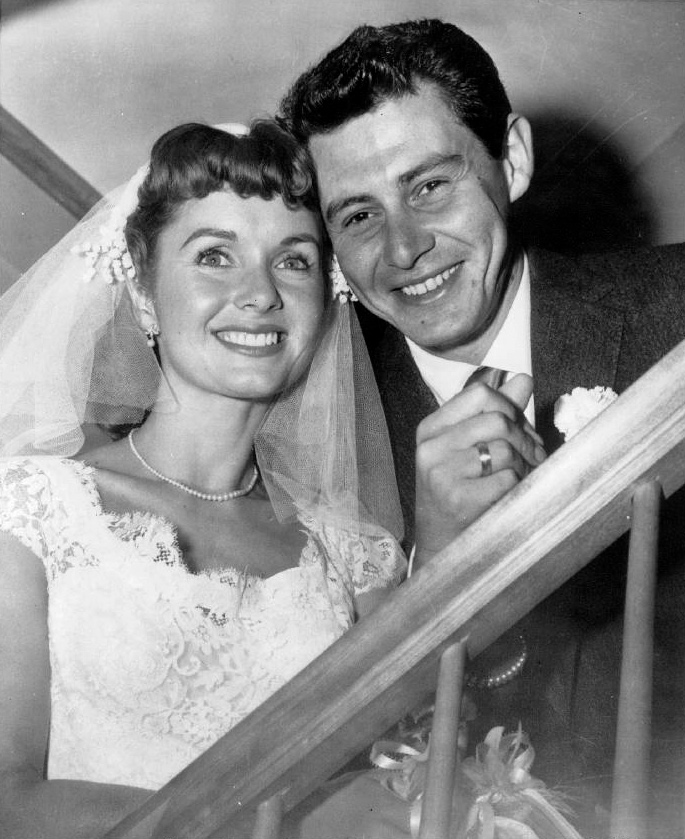
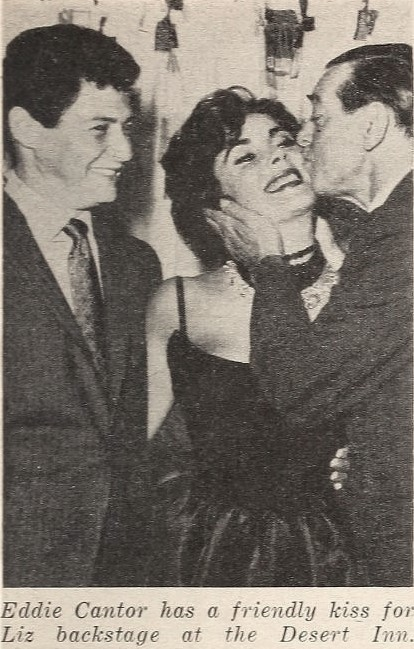
Fisher with Debbie Reynolds, then Elizabeth Taylor
- Hours after his divorce from Debbie Reynolds became final, Eddie Fisher married Elizabeth Taylor in Las Vegas.
- Two days of meetings began of the Mock-Up Inspection Board at McDonnell Corporation to review changes to the Mercury spacecraft. Test subjects in the mock-up spacecraft had found that when they couldn't reach any of the circuit breakers when the pressure suit was fully pressurized. Suggestions were made for changes in the layout of the space for the astronaut to permit more effective use of the controls, including the shoulder harness release, the spacecraft compression and decompression handles, the ready switch, and the spacecraft squib switch.

== May 13, 1959 (Wednesday) ==
- The deadline for Communist Pathet Lao troops to lay down their weapons or join the ranks of the Royal Army of Laos expired at noon. One battalion at Xieng Ngeun surrendered peacefully, while the other escaped and continued to fight. Pathet Lao leader Prince Souphanouvong was placed under house arrest two days later, but would become the President of Laos in 1975 after the Communists triumphed over the royal government.

== May 14, 1959 (Thursday) ==
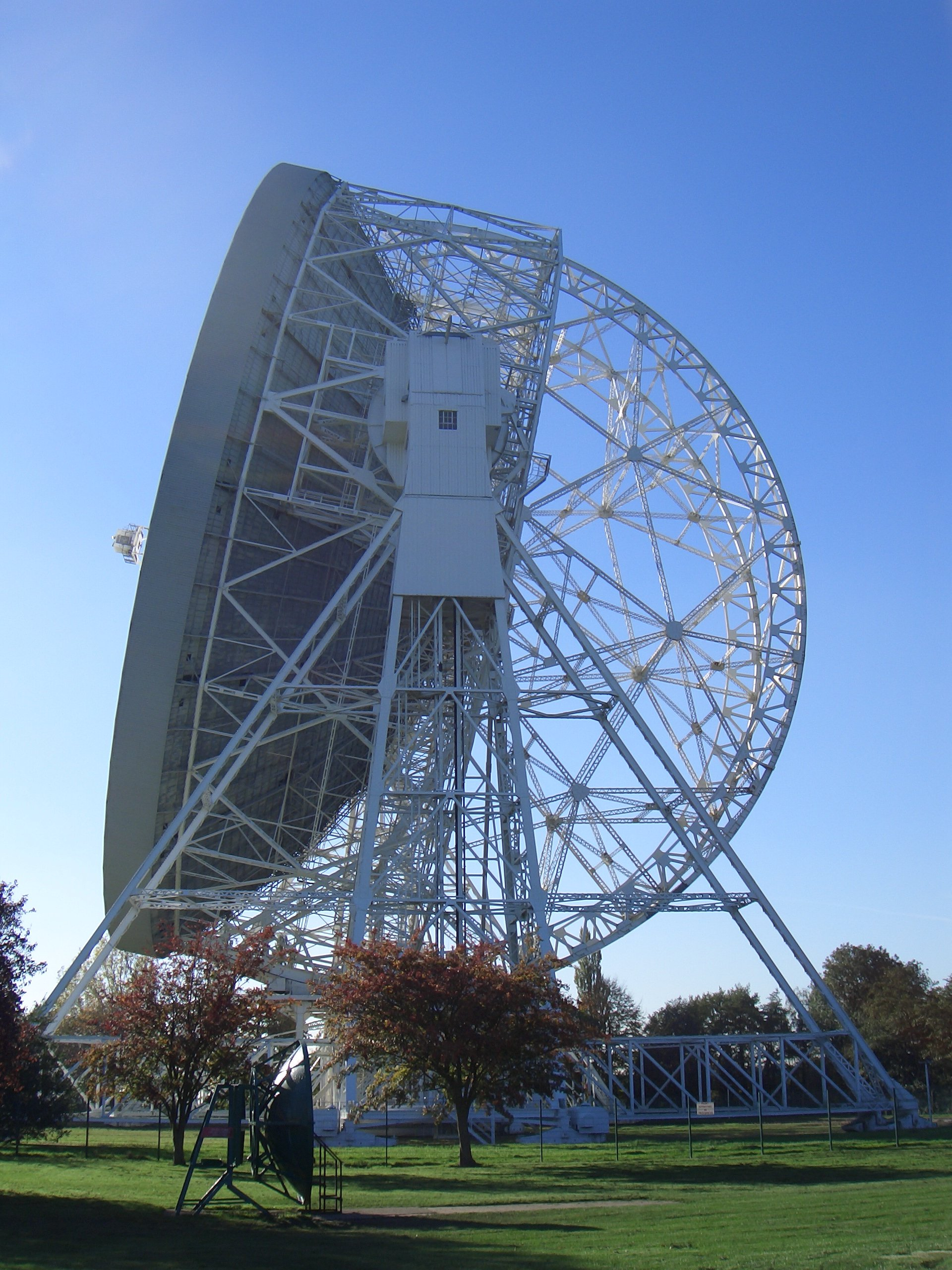
Radio telescope at Jodrell Bank

- For the first time, radio signals were bounced off the Moon from one station to another]]. The Jodrell Bank Observatory at Manchester in Britain transmitted a signal to the surface of the Moon to be received at the U.S. Air Force Cambridge Research Center (AFCRC) at Cambridge, Massachusetts in the United States. In Morse code, Jodrell Bank sent the statement "Jodrell Bank to Air Force Cambridge Research Centre. We will have no trouble with fishing boats on this circuit." The message, a spokesman said, "was a humorous link with the Russian trawlers recently suspected of tampering with Atlantic cables." The next day, Dr. John Evans transmitted a voice message, "Hello U.S.A. This is Jodrell Bank." The station in the U.S. had to reply by conventional means.
- U.S. President Dwight D. Eisenhower attended the groundbreaking for the Lincoln Center in New York City, which was witnessed by a crowd of 12,000.
- Died: Sidney Bechet, 62, American jazz saxophonist

== May 15, 1959 (Friday) ==
- Generals Richard G. Stilwell and Edward G. Lansdale delivered what was later described as "one of the most influential military documents of the past half century" to President Eisenhower. The report "Training Under the Mutual Security Program (With Emphasis on Development of Leaders)" proposed using the American military to further "political stability, economic growth, and social change" in developing nations.
- The Caravelle inaugurated passenger jet service for Air France and for the Scandinavian airline SAS.
- Fidel Castro announced an end to war crimes trials that had been conducted since his takeover of Cuba in January. An unofficial count was that 621 people had been executed for war crimes.

== May 16, 1959 (Saturday) ==
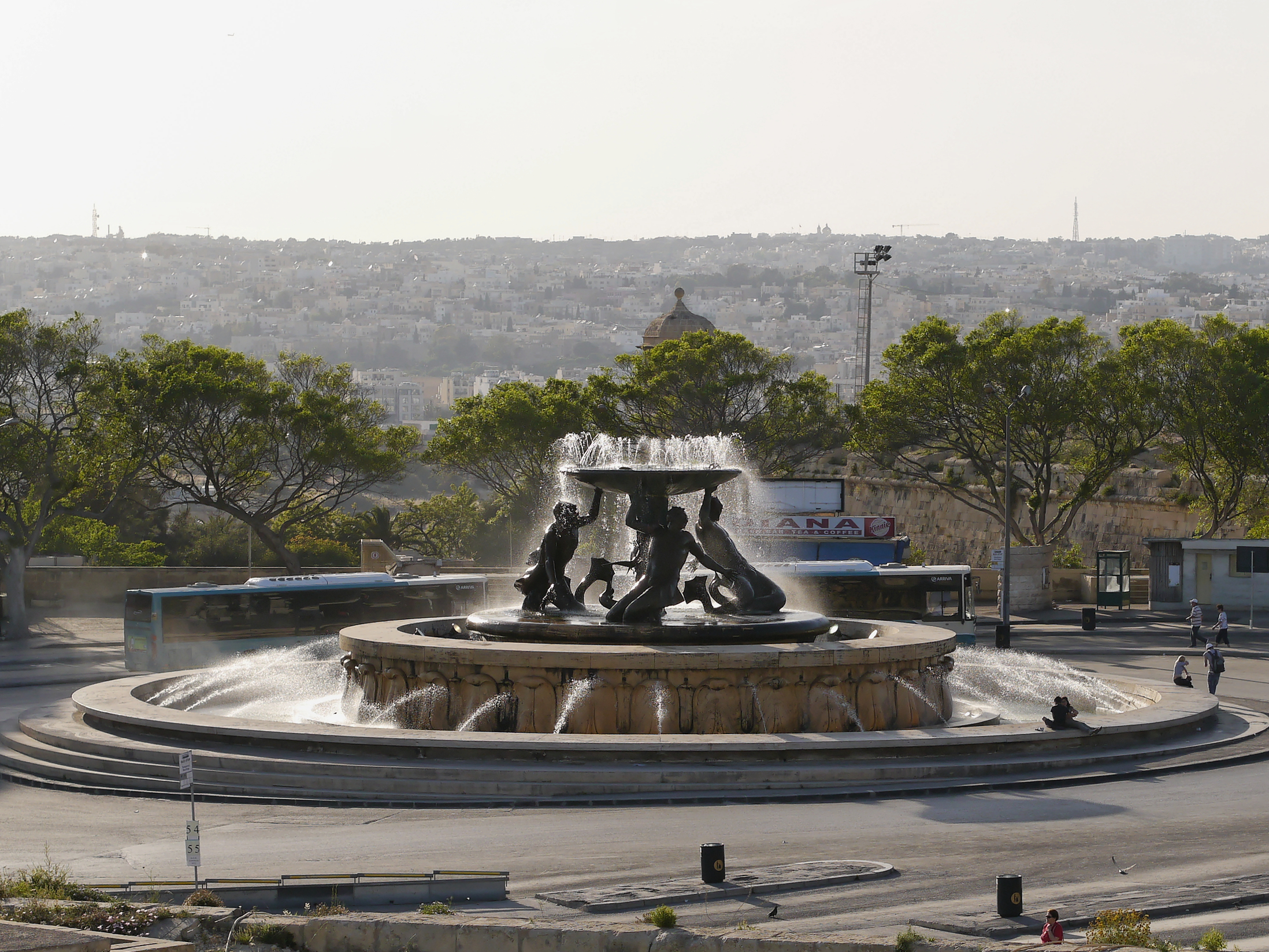
The Triton Fountain

- The Triton Fountain was inaugurated in Valletta, Malta.
- Seven high school students on their way home from the prom at Shelbyville, Illinois, died when the car in which they were riding was struck by a passenger train.
- Died: Elisha Scott, 64, Northern Irish footballer with 31 caps for the combined Ireland team in international competition

== May 17, 1959 (Sunday) ==
- Cristo-Rei was dedicated on an overlook over Lisbon, Portugal. It was inspired by the Christ the Redeemer statue in Rio de Janeiro, Brazil. The base of the monument, by architect António Lino, is in the form of a gate, standing 75 m (246 ft) tall. At the top is a statue of Christ the Redeemer, designed by sculptor Francisco Franco de Sousa, 28 m (92 ft) tall.
- Cuba's Agrarian Reform Law took effect, seizing all foreign-owned land and redistributing it to Cuban families. The Instituto Nacional de Reforma Agraria, created to oversee the redistribution, was headed by Che Guevara.
- Plácido Domingo made his operatic debut, as the character Matteo Borsa in a production of Rigoletto.
- Born:
  - Marcelo Loffreda, Argentine rugby player and British coach, in Buenos Aires
  - Jim Nantz, American sportscaster for CBS Sports, in Charlotte, North Carolina

== May 18, 1959 (Monday) ==
- The first Arabic-language commercial television station began broadcasting, as CLT (Compagnie Libanaise de Television) went on the air in Beirut, Lebanon. Broadcasting on Channel 9, the network is now part of Télé Liban.
- The National Liberation Committee of Côte d'Ivoire was launched in Conakry, Guinea.
- Hours after his divorce from Elaine Davis became final, Mickey Rooney married his fifth wife, Barbara Ann Thomson. The New York Daily News headline read "Half-Pint Takes a Fifth".
- Died:
  - Apsley Cherry-Garrard, 73, Antarctic explorer
  - Enrique Guaita, 48, Argentinian footballer who had 10 caps with the Italy national team (including for the 1934 FIFA World Cup and four with the Argentina national team

== May 19, 1959 (Tuesday) ==
- What would become known as the Ho Chi Minh Trail began as North Vietnam implemented plans to invade South Vietnam. Vo Bam was assigned the task of overseeing a program of facilitating transportation of soldiers, weapons and equipment, and General Võ Nguyên Giáp created Group 559 to construct roads and tunnels. In 1975, the South was, depending on perspective, conquered or liberated and incorporated into the unified Socialist Republic of Viet Nam.
- Atlanta desegregated its public libraries, later than most other cities in the South.
- Born: Nicole Brown Simpson, American ex-wife of O. J. Simpson, in Frankfurt, Germany (murdered 1994)

== May 20, 1959 (Wednesday) ==
- A group of 4,978 Japanese-Americans who had renounced their U.S. citizenship during World War II were restored to citizenship by the U.S. Justice Department.
- Born:
  - Israel Kamakawiwoʻole, Native Hawaiian musician; in Honolulu (d. 1997)
  - Bronson Pinchot, American film and TV actor, as Bronson Poncharavsky in New York City

== May 21, 1959 (Thursday) ==
- In the largest effort to that time against organized crime, narcotics agents in nine American states arrested 27 people who had participated in the November 14, 1957, Apalachin Meeting, following their indictment on federal charges of obstruction of justice. Twenty of the people rounded up were later convicted.
- The bathyscaphe Trieste made its first test dive, submerging for 2 1/2 hours at 700 feet (210 m) below the surface, with Jacques Piccard and Dr. Andreas Rechnitzer on board.
- Gypsy opened at The Broadway Theatre in New York to begin a run of 702 performances. The musical, directed by Jerome Robbins, and starring Ethel Merman as Gypsy Rose Lee, featured music by Jule Styne and lyrics by Stephen Sondheim, including the hit song Everything's Coming up Roses.
- Died:
  - Dr. Dudley Allen Buck, 32, inventor of the cryotron and member of the National Security Agency Scientific Advisory Board, died at a hospital in Winchester, Massachusetts, from viral pneumonia contracted two days earlier.
  - Dr. Louis Ridenour, 47, nuclear physicist, vice president Lockheed Missile Systems and chairman of the National Security Agency Scientific Advisory Board, died from a brain hemorrhage.

== May 22, 1959 (Friday) ==
- Brigadier General Benjamin O. Davis Jr., Deputy Chief of Staff for Operations, Headquarters U.S. Air Forces in Europe, Wiesbaden, Germany, was nominated for a temporary promotion to Major General, making him the first African-American to be so nominated. His promotion to two-star rank became effective on June 30 and lasted until May 16, 1960, making him the highest ranking Negro officer in the United States military. A permanent promotion followed in 1962, and Davis attained lieutenant general rank in 1965, retiring in 1998 as the first African-American 4-star general. Davis's father, Benjamin O. Davis Sr., had been the first African-American General, attaining the rank of brigadier general in 1940.
- The proposed Project Mercury balloon flight test program was canceled as NASA Space Task Group officials determined that the spacecraft could be tested environmentally inside the Lewis Research Center's altitude wind tunnel, including correct temperature and altitude simulations to 80,000 feet (24,000 m) altitude. The pilot could exercise the attitude control system, and retrorockets could be fired in the tunnel. Because a contract existed with the U.S. Air Force, it was decided the two balloon drop tests with uncrewed boilerplate spacecraft would be accomplished.

== May 23, 1959 (Saturday) ==
- A 2 1/2-year-old boy in Hazelwood, Missouri, was attacked and killed by a pack of at least five dogs. Six weeks later, in Novinger, Missouri, on July 3, another two-year-old boy would be killed by dogs.

== May 24, 1959 (Sunday) ==
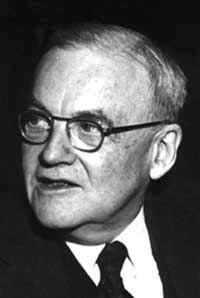
John Foster Dulles, 1888–1959

- The Anglo-Soviet Long Term Trade Agreement was signed, marking the first significant agreement between the U.S.S.R. and a Western nation since World War II. The five-year trade pact was renewed in 1964 and 1969.
- Born:
  - Pelle Lindbergh, Swedish-born NHL goaltender; in Stockholm (killed in auto crash, 1985)
  - Barry O'Farrell, Australian politician, High Commissioner to India, in Melbourne
- Died: John Foster Dulles, 71, who had recently resigned as U.S. Secretary of State (serving 1953–1959), died from cancer in Washington. President Eisenhower eulogized him as "one of the truly great men of our time".

== May 25, 1959 (Monday) ==
- Spree killer Charles Starkweather was granted a temporary reprieve 98 minutes before his 6:00 a.m. scheduled execution. Federal judge Richard Robinson of Omaha had been awakened at 1:45 a.m. to hear the motion, and signed the stay at 4:23 so that Starkweather, who had killed 11 people the year before, could have more time to perfect an appeal. The 20-year-old killer lived for one more month before going to the electric chair at 12:02 a.m. on June 25, 1959.

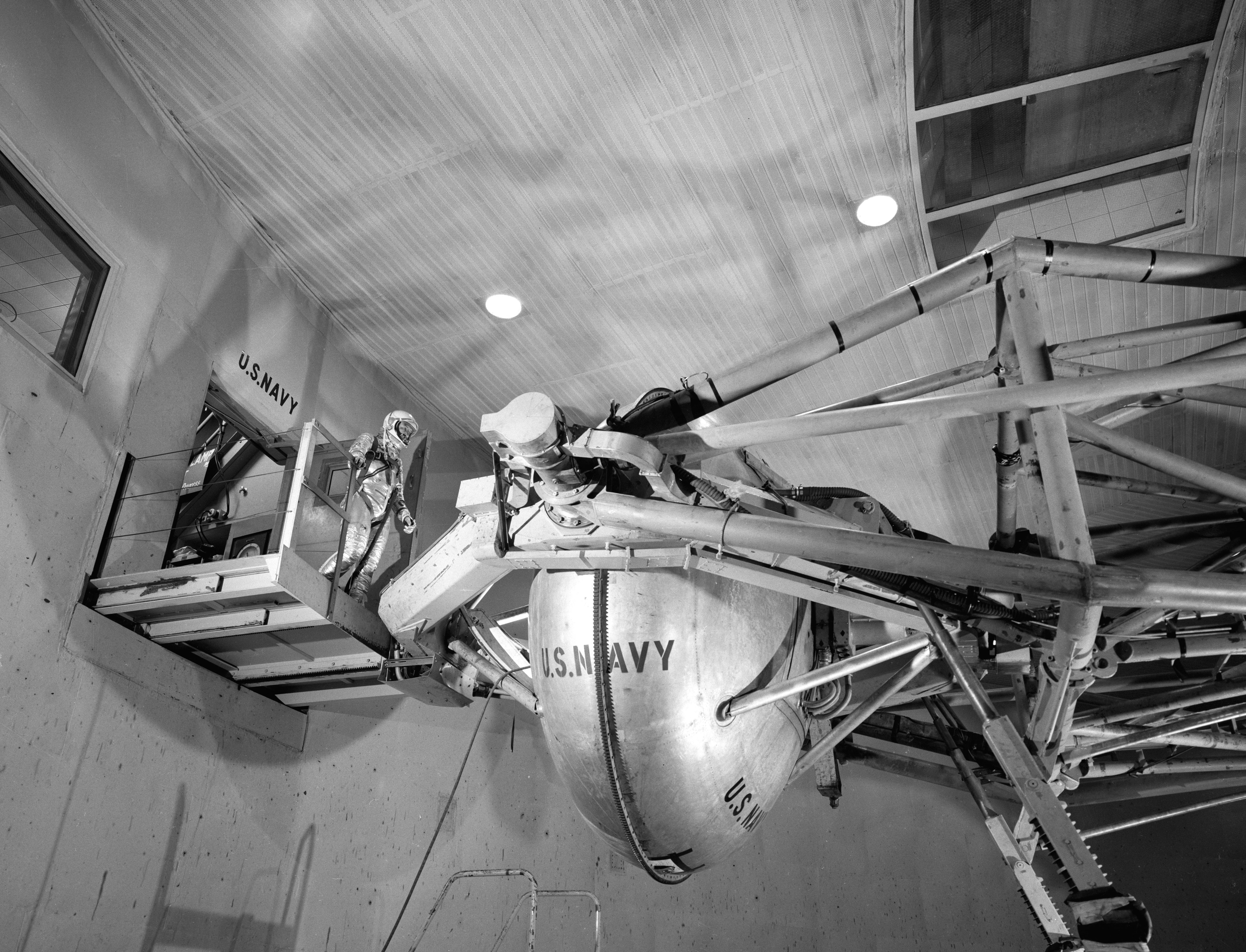
Astronaut Wally Schirra preparing to board Johnsville centrifuge in November 1960

- A meeting was held at Johnsville, Pennsylvania, to consider astronaut training programs on the centrifuge of the Aviation Medical Acceleration Laboratory in Johnsville, Pennsylvania. During the meeting, Space Task Group personnel reviewed the laboratory's draft memorandum of recommended methods for testing astronauts. Centrifuge training periods for the astronauts were discussed, and tentative dates were set for August 1959 and January 1960.

== May 26, 1959 (Tuesday) ==
- Harvey Haddix of the Pittsburgh Pirates did what no other baseball player had ever accomplished by pitching a perfect game – no hits, no runs, no errors—for 12 innings in Milwaukee, but Milwaukee Braves pitcher Lew Burdette was also hurling a shutout, and the score remained 0–0 going into the 13th inning. Félix Mantilla reached first base and the Braves went on to win 1–0. Haddix, who almost sat out the game because he was recovering from the flu, said later that he knew he had been pitching a no-hitter, but did not realize he had had a perfect game going until later.
- The 1964 Summer Olympic Games were awarded to Tokyo, receiving 34 of the 58 votes cast at the IOC meeting in Munich. Runner up was Detroit with 10 votes, followed by Vienna and Brussels.
- In fiction, Sally Brown, Charlie Brown's little sister, was born in the comic strip Peanuts.

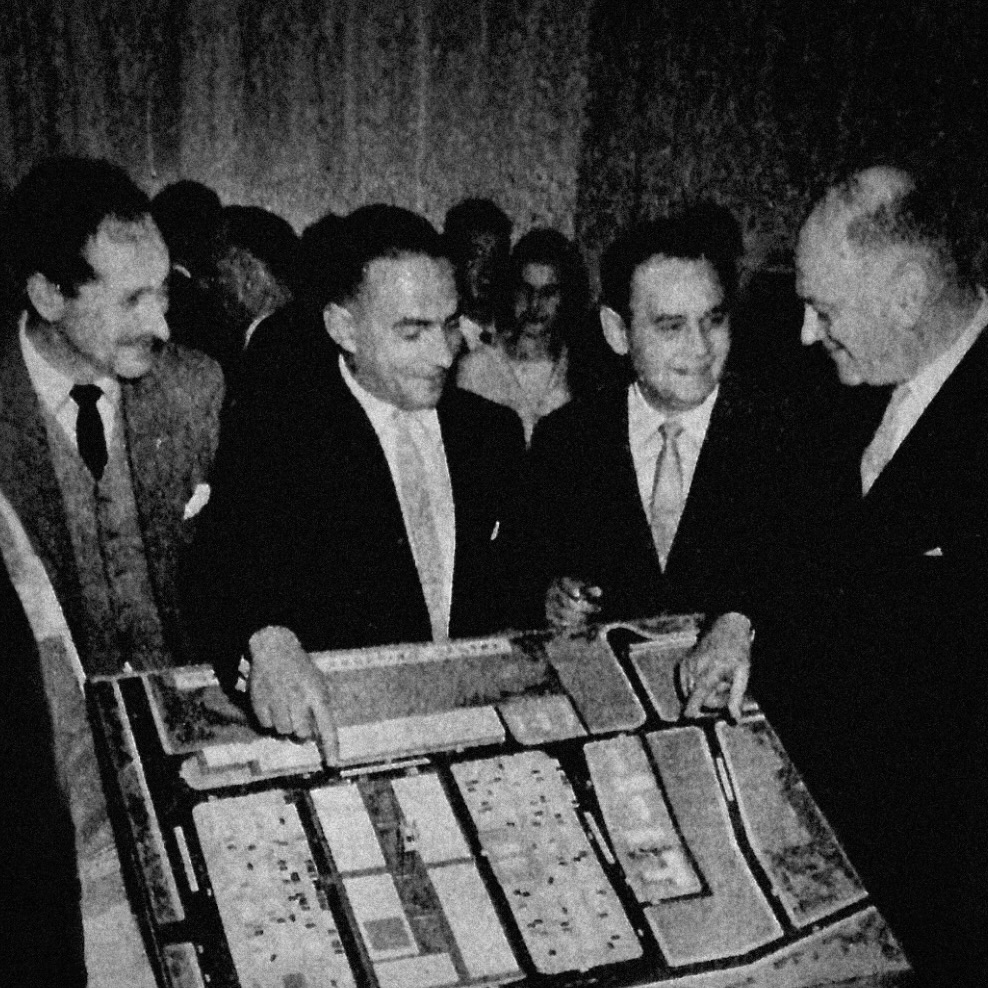
Announcement of Forest Hill Shopping Centre

- Plans for the highly-anticipated Forest Hill Shopping Centre in Melbourne were announced during a press conference the Hotel Australia. As of 2025, the centre is historically significant in the context of post-war Australian retailing, including introduction of the country's first Safeway supermarket, and was well-renowned in its early years for incorporating the latest in retail trends, drawing strong influence from the American outdoor mall model. Its early commercial success played a foundational role in the later billionaire fortunes of two of its key developers, George Herscu and Maurice Alter.

== May 27, 1959 (Wednesday) ==
- Nikita Khrushchev's ultimatum for action on Berlin expired. The Soviet premier had notified the Western powers on November 27, 1958, that if occupying armies were not withdrawn from West Berlin within six months, access through East Germany to the city would be closed off. The Geneva talks that began on May 11 halted action on the ultimatum. The late U.S. Secretary of State John Foster Dulles, who had said in 1958, "We are not afraid of May 27, 1959", was buried on that date, and the participants in the Geneva talks, including Soviet Foreign Minister Andrei Gromyko, attended the ceremonies at Arlington.
- Eight former engineers of Sperry Rand Corporation formed National Semiconductor for the purpose of producing transistors for electronic products.

== May 28, 1959 (Thursday) ==
- Two female monkeys became the first animals launched by NASA into outer space and returned safely to Earth. Able, a 7-pound (3.2 kg) rhesus, and Baker, a 1-pound (0.45 kg) spider monkey, were placed in the nose cone of a Jupiter rocket and sent 300 miles (480 km) aloft from Cape Canaveral, and recovered, unharmed, in the Caribbean Sea 1,100 miles (1,800 km) away.
- A train derailment killed 85 people in Indonesia, when the passenger train fell into a ravine near Tasikmalaya in the West Java province. Sabotage of the tracks was suspected in the crash.
- A quick-release, side exit hatch design was approved for the Mercury spacecraft. The design consisted of a continuous double explosive train to assure that all bolts were actually broken upon activation of the device. Factors in the design included the specific measurements of the largest Mercury Seven astronauts in fully-pressurized suits, and an astronaut's ability to reach any control under both routine and emergency conditions.
- North American Aviation delivered the first two Little Joe booster airframes for NASA's Mercury program, which was moving smoothly, in that rocket motors for the first flight were available at the test flight launching site in Wallops Station, Virginia. Space Task Group personnel had installed instruments in the first Mercury spacecraft, and procurement of the other flight items was on schedule.

== May 29, 1959 (Friday) ==
- In what an AP report described as "history's first international conference in the clouds", Christian Herter (U.S.), Andrei Gromyko (U.S.S.R.), Selwyn Lloyd (U.K.) and Maurice Couve de Murville (France) continued their negotiations concerning Berlin while flying over the Atlantic Ocean. The four foreign ministers were returning to Geneva following the funeral of John Foster Dulles.
- Born: Adrian Paul, British actor (Highlander: The Series), in London

== May 30, 1959 (Saturday) ==
- The Auckland Harbour Bridge, 1020 meters (3,348 feet) long, opened in New Zealand.
- In elections in Singapore, the Peoples Action Party, led by Lee Kuan Yew, won in a landslide, capturing 43 of the 51 seats in Parliament.
- After the calling off of the 1955 Anglo-Iraqi Agreement, the last British troops in Iraq left peacefully.
- American driver Rodger Ward won the 1959 Indianapolis 500 in front of a crowd of 150,000 people, and finished 23 seconds ahead of Jim Rathmann.
- Louisiana Governor Earl K. Long voluntarily entered a mental hospital in Texas and spent the next four weeks fighting efforts to have him committed.
- Nicaragua was invaded when two planes with rebel soldiers, under the direction of Nicaraguan-exile Enrique Lacayo Farfan, landed and fought with government troops. The rebellion was put down by June 12.
- Died: Raúl Scalabrini Ortiz, 61, Argentinian journalist

== May 31, 1959 (Sunday) ==
- Memorial Day Weekend closed at midnight, and was counted as a two-day holiday weekend for the last time, with May 30 falling on a Saturday. The toll of accidental deaths broke the record for a 54-hour weekend period. The 310 traffic fatalities recorded by the National Safety Council from 6 pm Friday to Midnight Sunday far exceeded the 1953 record of 241. There were 150 more accidental deaths, including 101 drownings, for a total of 460 dead in 54 hours. When May 30 fell on a Saturday again in 1964, Memorial Day weekend was counted as a three-day period starting on Thursday evening.
