= March 1959 =

Month of 1959

<<	March 1959					>>
Su	Mo	Tu	We	Th	Fr	Sa
1	2	3	4	5	6	7
8	9	10	11	12	13	14
15	16	17	18	19	20	21
22	23	24	25	26	27	28
29	30	31

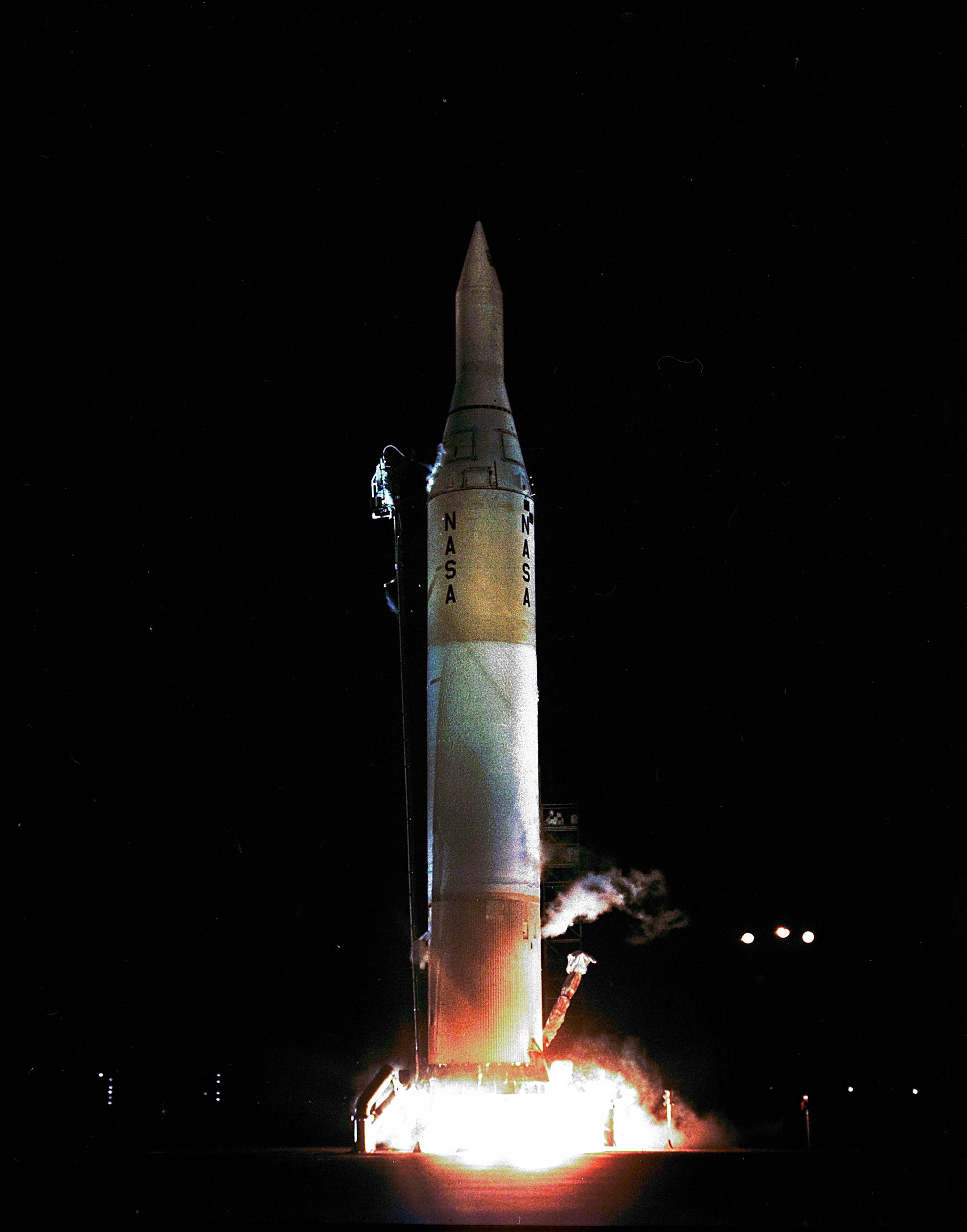
March 3, 1959: Pioneer 4 is launched and becomes the first U.S. planetary object after entering orbit around the Sun

The following events occurred in March 1959:

== March 1, 1959 (Sunday) ==
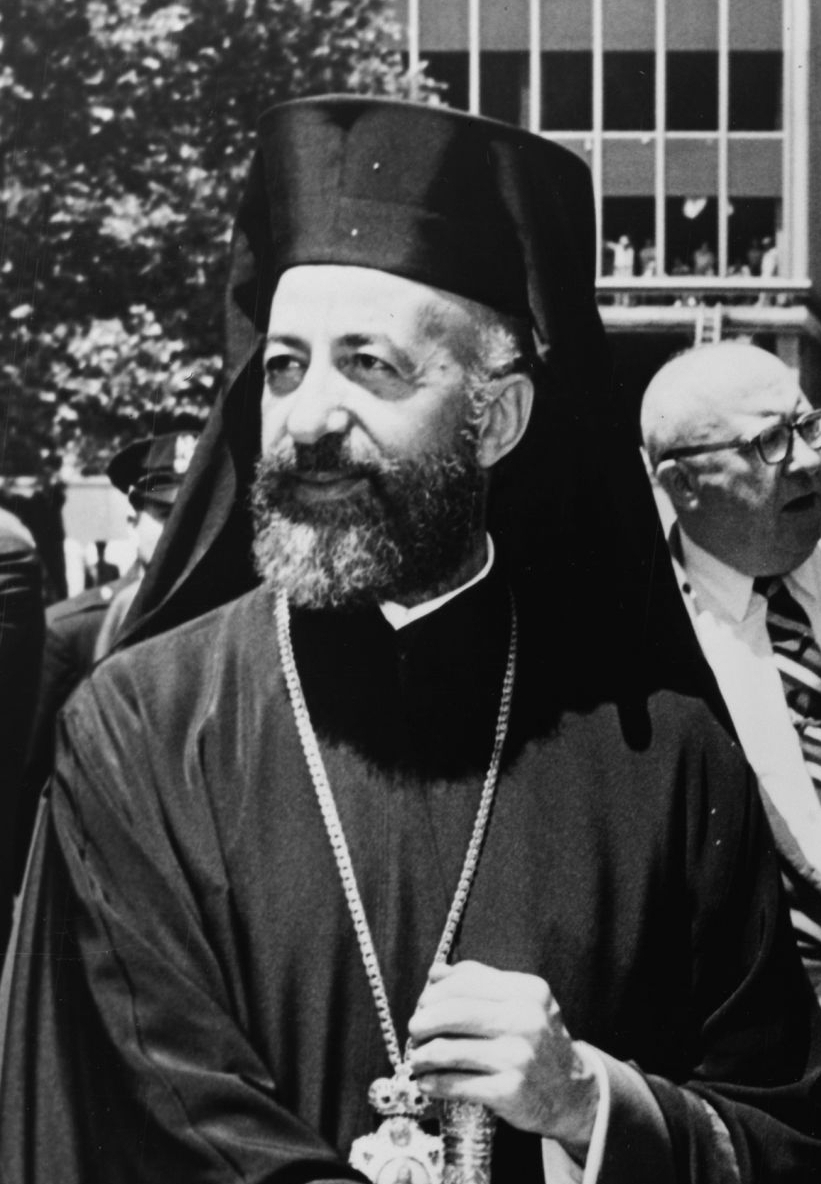
Makarios

- Archbishop Makarios III returned to Cyprus. Two years earlier, he had been allowed by British authorities to leave the Seychelles, where he had been kept in exile, on condition that he never return to Cyprus. An agreement in Zurich between Britain, Greece and Turkey, released Makarios from the conditions, in return for his agreement to drop his quest for "enosis", a movement to make Cyprus part of Greek territory. Later in 1959, Makarios won the election to become the first President of Cyprus.
- The USS Tuscaloosa, USS New Orleans, USS Tennessee and USS West Virginia were stricken from the United States Naval Vessel Register.

== March 2, 1959 (Monday) ==
- The Balkan Pact, signed in 1953 between Turkey, Greece and Yugoslavia, expired after Yugoslavia's President Tito announced that his nation would not renew it.
- Recording sessions for the album Kind of Blue by Miles Davis took place at Columbia's 30th Street Studio in New York City.

== March 3, 1959 (Tuesday) ==
- The United States launched the Pioneer 4 probe toward the Moon, shortly after midnight EST. The object became the first American spacecraft to completely escape the Earth's gravity, rather than going into orbit.
- The Mosul uprising began in Iraq as Colonel Abd al-Shawaff staged a rebellion against the government of President Abdul Karim Qasim. al-Shawaaf was killed the next day, and after the insurrection was put down, Qasim ordered the execution of officers suspected of complicity.
- At the British colonial detention camp in Hola, Kenya, where Mau Mau rebels were held, 11 prisoners were beaten to death and 20 others seriously injured by prison staff, in what later was known as the Hola massacre.
- In Tifton, Georgia, nine children, ranging in age from 5 to 15, drowned after their school bus ran off a road and overturned into a farm pond.
- In Nyasaland (now Malawi), Colonial Governor Robert Armitage declared a state of emergency after riots broke out in that Southern African nation, banning the Nyasaland African Congress (NAC).
- Died: Lou Costello, 52, American comedian who was famous for his partnership with Bud Abbott in the duo of Abbott and Costello, died of a heart attack, shortly after completion of filming of The 30 Foot Bride of Candy Rock, his only film after the partnership with Abbott ended.

== March 4, 1959 (Wednesday) ==
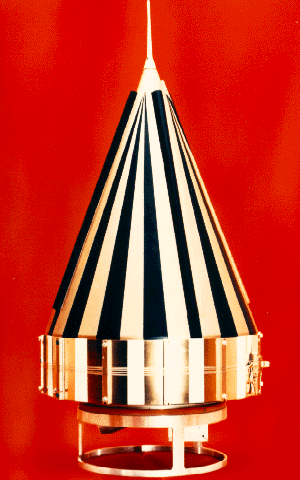
Pioneer 4

- Pioneer 4 became the second man-made object to pass the Moon and to enter an orbit around the Sun, becoming the first American-made planetary object. The Soviet satellite Luna 1 had achieved solar orbit on January 7. Contact with Pioneer IV was lost two days later after its batteries ran out of power.
- The government of Cuba nationalized the Cuban Telephone Company, a subsidiary of ITT.
- Born:
  - Rick Ardon, Australian news anchor, in Perth
  - Irina Strakhova, Russian race walker, in Novosibirsk
- Died: Maxie Long, 80, American Olympic track medalist in 1900

== March 5, 1959 (Thursday) ==
- At Ankara, the United States agreed to defend the remaining members of the Central Treaty Organization (CENTO) in case of attack, signing bilateral defense agreements with Iran, Turkey and Pakistan.
- In Wrightsville, Arkansas, a fire at a dormitory for the Arkansas Training School for Negro Boys killed 21 boys. The doors had been locked, and 47 boys who survived the fire had kicked their way through heavy metal screens to escape.
- The Federal Reserve Bank raised the interest rate half a point to 3%
- U.S. Secretary of Defense Neil H. McElroy told reporters that "a surprise with missiles in the foreseeable future is almost impossible".

== March 6, 1959 (Friday) ==
- Pope John XXIII issued a notificatio banning "the spreading of images and writings that propose the devotion of The Divine Mercy" that had been the work of Sister Faustina Kowalska.
- By order of the Castro government, all rents in Cuba were reduced by 50 percent.
- Space Task Group and McDonnell Aircraft Corporation officials met to discuss spare part and ground support equipment requirements for Project Mercury.
- Born: Tom Arnold, American actor and comedian, in Ottumwa, Iowa

== March 7, 1959 (Saturday) ==
- "Wishing Won't Hold Berlin", by former U.S. Secretary of State Dean Acheson, appeared in The Saturday Evening Post, after Acheson concluded that the Eisenhower administration was not doing enough to respond to the Soviet ultimatum that all armies withdraw from Berlin (which was surrounded by Communist East Germany).

== March 8, 1959 (Sunday) ==
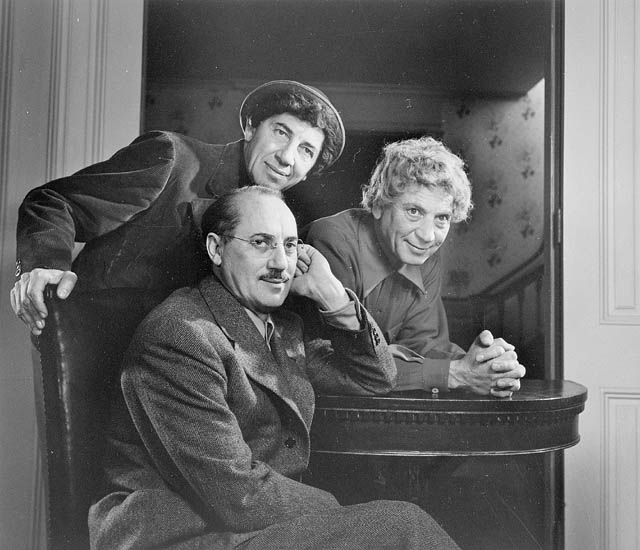
The Marx Brothers

- The Marx Brothers made their last screen appearance, as Groucho, Chico and Harpo Marx starred in "The Incredible Jewel Robbery" on the CBS anthology program General Electric Theater.
- An abort test was conducted at Wallops Island on a full-scale model of the Mercury spacecraft with the escape tower, using a Recruit escape rocket. The configuration did not perform as expected (erratic motion), and as a result, the Langley Research Center was requested to test small-scale flight models of the abort system to determine its motion in flight.
- A 19-year-old airman at Davis-Monthan AFB committed suicide by setting a high-altitude test chamber to simulate 73,000 feet (22,000 m), entering, then pulling off his oxygen mask.
- Born: Aidan Quinn, American actor; in Rockford, Illinois

== March 9, 1959 (Monday) ==
- The Barbie doll made its debut at the American International Toy Fair in New York. Ruth Handler named the doll for her daughter. In 1961, her son Ken would have his name bestowed on another doll.
- The Langley Research Center began exploratory noise transmission tests for Project Mercury. Meanwhile, tests began at Langley and at Wallops Island on several types of ablating materials with a simulation of temperature and other conditions that would be expected from atmospheric re-entry from orbit.
- Born: Giovanni di Lorenzo, European journalist, in Stockholm

== March 10, 1959 (Tuesday) ==
- When it appeared that the Dalai Lama was on the verge of arrest by the Communist government of China, a rebellion broke out as 30,000 Tibetans surrounded his palace, the Norbulingka. The Dalai Lama would say later that "That day, the people stopped my journey to the Chinese army camp ... and in the meantime, they declared the independence of Tibet.".
- Born: Mike Wallace, American race car driver, in Fenton, Missouri

== March 11, 1959 (Wednesday) ==
- The Eurovision Song Contest 1959, staged in Cannes, was won for the Netherlands by "'n Beetje" sung by Teddy Scholten (music by Dick Schallies, text by Willy van Hemert).
- The Sikorsky SH-3 Sea King helicopter, also known as the H-3 Pelican or the S-61, was given its first flight by test pilots.
- At Wallops Island, Langley's Pilotless Aircraft Research Division conducted the first full-scale Project Mercury test simulating a pad-abort situation. For the first 50 feet (15 m) the flight made a straight climb, then pitched through several turns and impacted at sea. The malfunction was traced to the loss of a graphite insert from one of the three abort rocket nozzles, which had caused a misalignment of thrust.

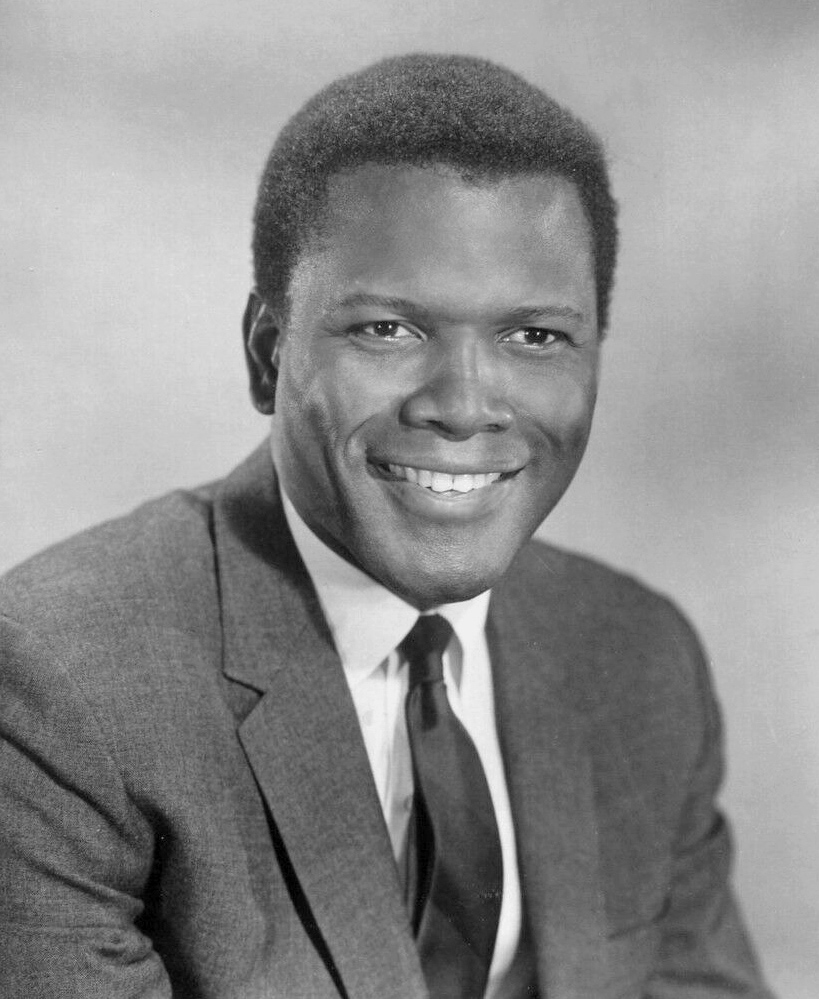
Poitier

- A Raisin in the Sun, by African-American playwright Lorraine Hansberry, and starring Sidney Poitier and Claudia McNeil, made its Broadway debut, at the Ethel Barrymore Theatre. The play ran for 538 performances.
- Died: Lester Dent, 54, creator of Doc Savage

== March 12, 1959 (Thursday) ==
- By a margin of 323 to 89, the U.S. House of Representatives voted to allow Hawaii to become the 50th state, contingent upon passage by Hawaiian voters. The night before, the Senate had voted its approval, 76–15. The bill was signed into law by President Eisenhower on March 18, 1959.
- Tomasi Kulimoetoke II became the King of Wallis Island, reigning until May 7, 2007.
- Born: Milorad Dodik, Bosnian Serb politician who served, 2018 to 2022, as the Serbian member of the 3-person Presidency of Bosnia & Herzegovina and as the troika's Chairman, November 2020 to July 2021; in Banja Luka, Yugoslavia

== March 13, 1959 (Friday) ==
- The United Nations General Assembly voted 56–0, with 23 abstentions, to end the UN Trusteeship over the French Cameroons by January 1, 1960, and to schedule a plebiscite in the north and south sections of the British Cameroons.
- With the admission of Hawaii voted so soon after the admission of Alaska, flag manufacturers asked that the adoption of the 50-star flag be postponed until July 4, 1960. Digby Chandler, president of Annin & Co, said that the industry had already manufactured 300,000 flags with 49 stars, and added, "If we are forced to throw all these away and start making 50-star flags for next July 4 there will be no flag industry left." One proposal was to add an eighth star in the middle row of the seven rows of seven stars.

== March 14, 1959 (Saturday) ==
- Sharaf Rashidov was elected First Secretary of the Communist Party of the Uzbek Soviet Socialist Republic. Answering only to Moscow, Rashidov ruled for 24 years with otherwise unlimited and corrupt power, lasting until his death on October 31, 1983.

== March 15, 1959 (Sunday) ==
- Robert Foster, 32, set a record for holding his breath, remaining underwater for 13 minutes, 42.5 seconds (13:42.5), at San Rafael, California The record stood for 48 years, until broken by Arvydas and Diana Gaiciunas in Druskininkai, Lithuania, on June 16, 2007, at almost 16 minutes (15:58). Both Foster and the Gaiciunas siblings hyperventilated with pure oxygen beforehand in order to drive carbon dioxide from their lungs. The recognized record without such preparations is 11 minutes, 35 seconds, by freediver Stéphane Mifsud on June 8, 2009.
- The prison at the Curragh Camp, where Ireland detained suspected terrorists without formal charges, was formally closed.
- Born: Harold Baines, American baseball player, in Easton, Maryland
- Died: Duncan Hines, 78, restaurant critic who later lent his name to a line of cake mixes

== March 16, 1959 (Monday) ==
- The Republic of Iraq signed a treaty of economic cooperation with the Soviet Union, providing for financial aid totaling 550 million roubles (equivalent to US$47,000,000 at the time)
- Procurement of five developmental pressure suits for Project Mercury astronauts, at a cost of $25,000 apiece (equivalent to almost $260,000 apiece more than 60 years later), was requested by the Space Task Group from NASA Headquarters.
- Born:
  - Michael J. Bloomfield, American astronaut on three shuttle missions; in Flint, Michigan
  - Flavor Flav (stage name for William Jonathan Drayton, Jr.), American rapper; in Roosevelt, New York
  - Jens Stoltenberg, Prime Minister of Norway 2000–2001 and 2005–2013; in Oslo
- Died: John B. Salling, 112, American Civil War veteran, in Kingsport, Tennessee. His death left one surviving veteran claimant, Walter Williams of Houston, whose age and service were later disputed.

== March 17, 1959 (Tuesday) ==
- Tenzin Gyatso, the 14th Dalai Lama, escaped Tibet and found sanctuary in India.

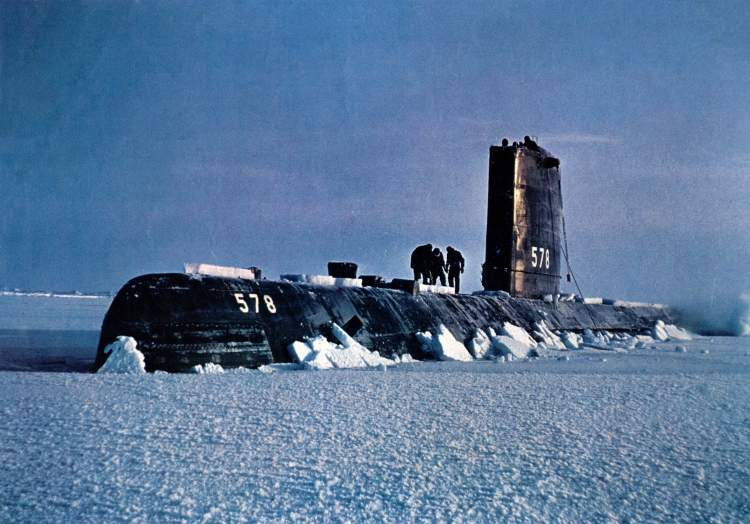
March 17, 1959: USS Skate surfaces at the North Pole

- USS Skate surfaced at the North Pole after spending a record 12 days under the polar ice cap. In a ceremony at the pole, the ashes of polar explorer Sir Hubert Wilkins, who had died in 1958, were scattered at the pole.
- Funds were requested to purchase six main parachute and 12 drogue parachute canisters from the Goodyear Aircraft Corporation in support of the Little Joe and Big Joe phases of Project Mercury.
- McDonnell Aircraft inspected the completed Mercury spacecraft mock-up and directed a restudy of pilot escape; rearrangement of crew space to make handles, actuators, and other instruments more accessible to the pilot; and modification of the clock, sequence lights, and other displays.
- Born: Danny Ainge, Boston Celtics guard and Toronto Blue Jays second baseman; in Eugene, Oregon

== March 18, 1959 (Wednesday) ==
- U.S. President Dwight D. Eisenhower signed the Hawaii Statehood Bill into law at a White House ceremony, but the process of admission was not over. "Under this legislation," said Ike, "the citizens of Hawaii will soon decide whether their islands shall become our 50th state." Voters still had to elect new officials and decide on whether to accept all of the bill's provisions, with statehood conditioned on Palmyra Island not being included.
- Born:
  - Luc Besson, French film director (The Fifth Element), in Paris
  - Irene Cara, American singer (Fame), in New York City (d. 2022)

== March 19, 1959 (Thursday) ==
- After the Beijing government ordered the Dalai Lama to report without his bodyguards, fighting broke out in Lhasa, Tibet, as Tibetans battled Chinese troops. The Chinese government stated that thousands of rebels had attacked Lhasa and had been defeated after a two-day battle by Chinese troops.
- Two other islands joined Addu in the United Suvadive Republic in the Maldives Islands. The republic would be abolished in September 1963).
- The Shaggy Dog, one of the most popular films of 1959, was first shown.

== March 20, 1959 (Friday) ==
- An unidentified visitor to Lenin's Mausoleum, in Moscow, threw a hammer at the sarcophagus housing Lenin's remains, breaking the glass. The event was not reported in the Soviet press and would not be revealed until after the breakup of the Soviet Union.
- Mercury-Redstone and Mercury-Jupiter test objectives were discussed in a meeting at Langley between Space Task Group and Army Ballistic Missile Agency personnel. It was decided that the first flights of the Redstone and Jupiter rockets would be uncrewed. The second flights would carry live animals, specifically small monkeys, and the Jupiter phase would end at that point. The six remaining Redstone rockets would be used for astronaut training flights. Space Task Group then prepared the study "Recovery Operations for Project Mercury" covering suborbital and orbital flights, and submitted it to the U.S. Department of Defense for comment.
- In Modesto, California, the record for phonebooth stuffing was broken as 32 "slightly built" students at Modesto Junior College packed themselves into a regulation-sized booth—7 feet (2.1 m) tall and 32 inches (810 mm) square. However, for safety reasons, the booth was set on its side, and the telephone had been removed. Earlier in the month, 25 students in South Africa had broken the record of 19.
- Born:
  - Sting (ring name for Steve Borden) American pro wrestler, in Omaha,
  - Steve McFadden, British TV actor known for portraying "Phil Mitchell" in EastEnders; in London

== March 21, 1959 (Saturday) ==
- The University of California won the NCAA basketball championship, defeating West Virginia 71–70. Cal blew a 13-point lead in the second half, and the Mountaineers came within one point with 0:53 left. West Virginia did not foul until 0:02 was left. Denny Fitzpatrick's free throw missed, but the Mountaineers' Jerry West was not able to get the ball until time had run out.
- Born: Nobuo Uematsu, Japanese composer; in Kochi

== March 22, 1959 (Sunday) ==
- In a televised address, Cuban's new leader, Fidel Castro announced that, effective immediately, he was outlawing all racial discrimination. Previously segregated clubs, parks and beaches were opened to Cuba's black residents by law.
- The Constitutional Assembly of Mauritania approved a democratic constitution for the African state, which would become independent of France in 1960. Provisions for a multiparty parliamentary system would last only five years, after which Governor Moktar Ould Daddah's Mauritanian People's Party became the only legal party.
- Born: Matthew Modine, American film actor; in Loma Linda, California

== March 23, 1959 (Monday) ==
- Nine coal miners were killed in an explosion at Brimstone, Tennessee.
- Lee Harvey Oswald earned his GED, with a passing score of 77. He had dropped out of the tenth grade of a Fort Worth High School in 1956.
- Died: Neil Moss, 20, British caver, from hypercapnia, after becoming trapped in England's Peak Cavern, in Derbyshire, near Castleton.

== March 24, 1959 (Tuesday) ==
- As Communist rebels took control in Iraq, Prime Minister Abdel Karim Kassem announced his nation's withdrawal from the Baghdad Pact. The withdrawal had been expected following the July 14, 1958, revolution that overthrew the government of King Faisal II.
- The Imam Abd al-Rahman al-Mahdi, son of the Mahdi, founder of the Umma Party in Sudan, and leader of the mahdiyah sect of Islam, died after a reign of 50 years and was succeeded by his son, Siddiq al-Mahdi; who died on October 2, 1961.
- Texas Instruments showed off the integrated circuit for the first time, at an electronics industry convention in New York.
- A proposal was introduced in the City Council of New York City to study the possibility of the city seceding from the New York State and becoming its own state.
- Born: Maribel Espinoza, Honduran lawyer and politician

== March 25, 1959 (Wednesday) ==
- French President Charles de Gaulle opened his first presidential press conference with a statement that France supported German reunification "as the aim and normal destiny of the German people. provided that [they] do not question their present frontiers to the west, east, north or south." "Germany today is not a danger to us," said De Gaulle as he announced a new relationship with his World War II adversary.

== March 26, 1959 (Thursday) ==
- Italy and the United States signed an agreement providing for 30 medium range Jupiter missiles to be deployed on Italian soil as the first placement in Europe of the new MRBM.
- International radio communication was blocked out for 11 hours, beginning at 5 p.m. Pacific time. It was believed that an eruption on the sun disrupted transmissions, although such disturbances normally lasted only 30 minutes.
- A circus lion terrorized a crowd at New York City's Madison Square Garden after escaping a cage, running around the arena, then jumping a rail and walking into the main lobby. Ponto, the 800-pound (360 kg) star of the Ringling Bros. and Barnum & Bailey Circus "Big Cat" act, was captured 15 minutes later after wandering into a blocked corridor.
- The Langley Research Center received approval to conduct hypersonic flight tests for the Mercury spacecraft. Langley's Pilotless Aircraft Research Division would conduct tests on heat transfer rates at a velocity of Mach 17 (i.e., 17 times the speed of sound), and dynamic behavior tests from a velocity of Mach 10 to a subsonic speed.
- Space Task Group, Langley Research Center, and Air Force School of Aviation Medicine personnel met to plan bio-pack experiments that would be placed in several of the Little Joe research and development test flights.
- Tenor saxophonist John Coltrane held initial recording sessions for the album Giant Steps with Cedar Walton and Lex Humphries.
- Died: Raymond Chandler, 70, creator of Philip Marlowe

== March 27, 1959 (Friday) ==
- North Carolina became the first state in the United States to require polio vaccines for all children. The measure, already approved in the Senate, passed 73–3 in the House and was signed by Governor Luther H. Hodges.
- NASA Administrator T. Keith Glennan provided instructions for the marking of vehicles launched for all NASA missions, including the Mercury spacecraft. He stated that policy would be to paint the words UNITED STATES in bold block form.

== March 28, 1959 (Saturday) ==
- The government of Tibet, the "Ganden Phodrang", was abolished by an order signed by Chinese premier Zhou Enlai. The Dalai Lama was replaced by a puppet ruler, the Panchen Lama.
- Space Task Group officials met to decide whether the Mercury spacecraft escape system should be changed. In the original proposal, McDonnell's plan was to use eight small rockets housed in a fin adapter. The plan was set aside for a NASA developed plan in which a single-motor tripod would be used. Later, during a test of the escape system, the escape rockets appeared to fire properly but the spacecraft began to tumble after launch. Space Task Group engineers considered discarding the NASA tower-escape system and revisited the McDonnell proposal but concluded that NASA's single-motor tripod concept should be retained.

== March 29, 1959 (Sunday) ==
- Barthélemy Boganda, Prime Minister of the Central African Republic, was slated to become its first President, but was killed in the crash of a French airliner. After taking off from Berberati for the capital, Bangui, the plane crashed, killing the Prime Minister and eight other people. In celebration of the martyred founding father of the nation, March 29 is a legal holiday in the C.A.R., as Boganda Day.
- Born: Barry Blanchard, Canadian mountaineer; in Calgary

== March 30, 1959 (Monday) ==
- Chief Judge Akio Date of the District Court in Tokyo ruled in the Sunakawa case that the stationing of United States military forces in Japan violated Article 9 of the Japanese Constitution. The decision would be reversed in the Supreme Court of Japan on December 14.
- The Dalai Lama took flight from Lhasa to the monastery of Tawang Town, a disputed territory controlled by the Indian government, with the help of CIA operatives, Tibetan guerrillas, and the government of Indian Prime Minister Jawaharlal Nehru. With 85,000 of his co-ethnics, the Lama settled in the town of Dharamsala, in the Himachal Pradesh state of India.
- In two decisions (Bartkus v. Illinois, 359 U.S. 121 and Abbate v. United States 359 U.S. 187), the United States Supreme Court ruled that a person could be charged with the same crime in both state and federal court proceedings without violating the double jeopardy clause of the Fifth Amendment ("nor shall any person be subject for the same offence to be twice put in jeopardy of life or limb"), under the dual sovereignty doctrine.

== March 31, 1959 (Tuesday) ==
- Action Comics No. 252 (May 1959) reached newsstands, and, in a story entitled "The Supergirl From Krypton", introduced Supergirl to the world.

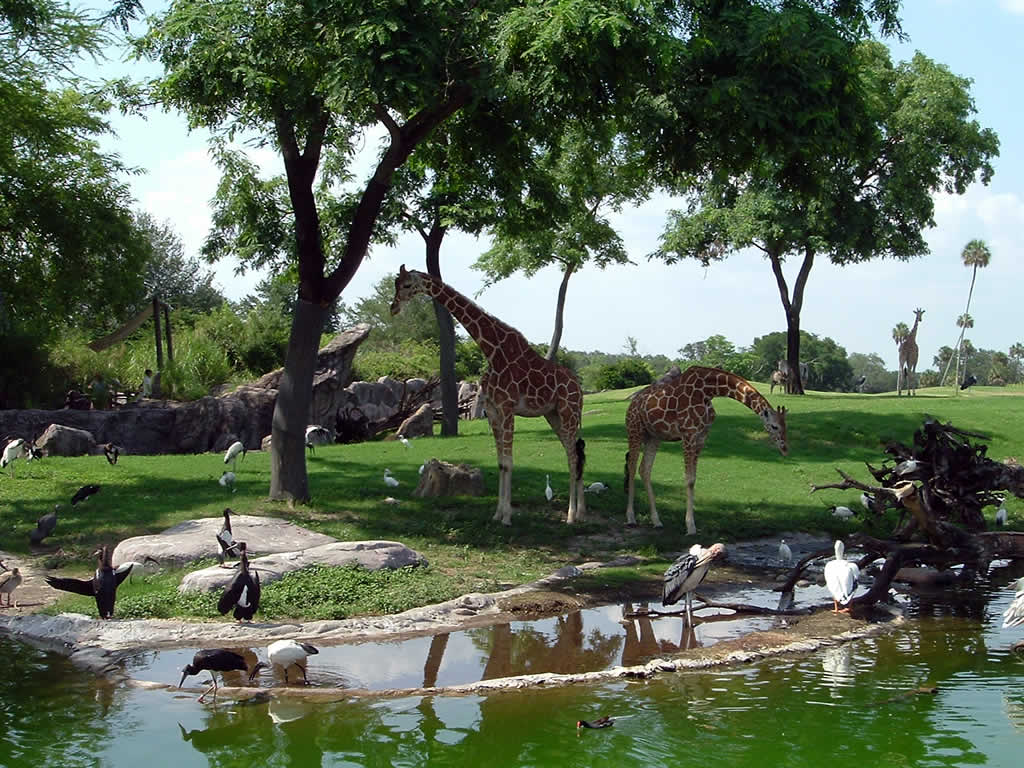
Busch Gardens in Florida

- Busch Gardens in Tampa, Florida, opened to the public as a hospitality facility with a bird garden following a dedication ceremony. Until Walt Disney World superseded it, the (by then) African safari park was Florida's leading tourist attraction.
- Space Task Group briefed Atlantic Missile Range personnel about the Mercury spacecraft, including how it would function during a normal flight on an Atlas rocket, and the groups suggested methods for initiation of an abort during different powered phases of a flight. From the meeting, work was started to draft a Project Mercury range safety plan.
