= April 1959 =

Month of 1959

<<	April 1959					>>
Su	Mo	Tu	We	Th	Fr	Sa
			1	2	3	4
5	6	7	8	9	10	11
12	13	14	15	16	17	18
19	20	21	22	23	24	25
26	27	28	29	30

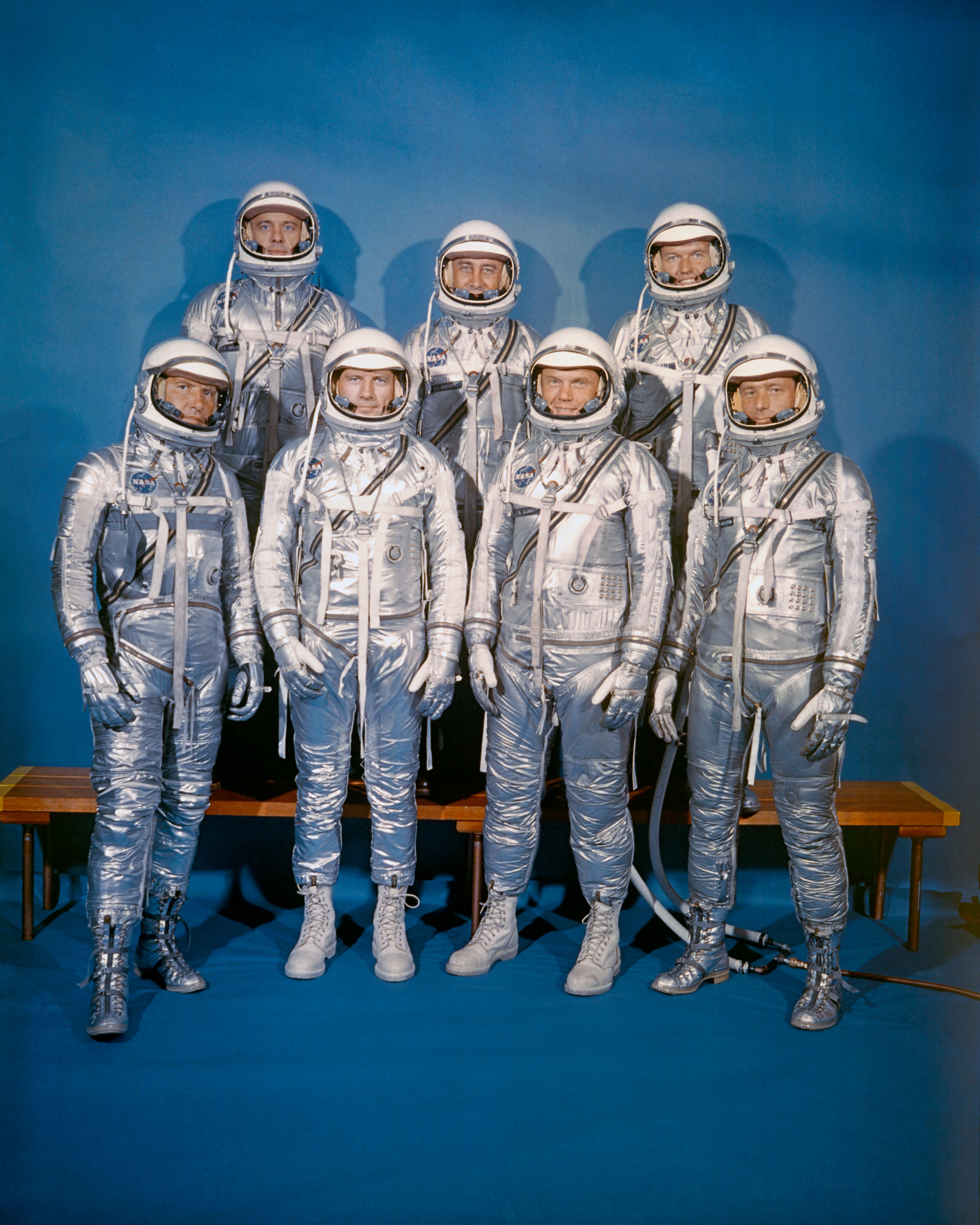
April 9, 1959: The Mercury Seven astronauts are introduced. Pictured front row, Wally Schirra, Deke Slayton, John Glenn and Scott Carpenter, and back row, Alan Shepard, Gus Grissom and Gordon Cooper

The following events occurred in April 1959:

== April 1, 1959 (Wednesday) ==
- Kazuo Inamori founded worldwide office copy complex machine and solar panel brand Kyocera in Japan; the predecessor name was Kyoto Ceramic.
- After the Soviet Union restricted travel of American diplomats, the U.S. did the same for the Soviets in America.
- The Research Steering Committee on Manned Space Flight, chaired by Harry J. Goett of the Ames Research Center, was created to assist NASA in long-range planning and basic research on human spaceflight. The Goett Committee would meet for the first time on May 25 to concentrate on NASA's long-range objectives, particularly the issue of a flight program to follow Project Mercury. H. Kurt Strass of the Space Task Group (STG) at Langley Field envisioned that the next project would include an enlarged Mercury capsule to place two astronauts in orbit for three days, or accompanied by a large cylindrical structure to support a two-week mission.
- The Navajo Nation Supreme Court came into existence, along with a set of district courts with jurisdiction in Navajo territory in Arizona and New Mexico.
- A U.S. Air Force cargo plane crashed at Orting, Washington, killing all four of the crew on board. Witnesses reported that the C-118 had collided with another object in midair, and the incident has become part of UFO lore. The pilot, Lt. Robert R. Dimmick, radioed, "We have hit something, or something has hit us", moments before the crash.

== April 2, 1959 (Thursday) ==
- The Soviet Union's Council for Russian Orthodox Church Affairs advised the Russian Orthodox patriarch of new measures to reduce the number of convents, followed by property and income tax increases on the convents.
- NASA completed the selection of seven men as astronauts for Project Mercury. Originally planning to pick only six men, the STG screened 508 records and found 110 candidates who met the minimum standards. STG interviewed 69, invited 32 to go through tests and then narrowed the number down to 18. Deputy Administrator Robert Gilruth suggested picking the seven finalists with the most flying experience.
- At the same meeting, prospective bidders from 20 companies were briefed on construction of the worldwide tracking range for Project Mercury. The preliminary plan called for an orbital mission tracking network of 14 sites. Contacts had not been made with the governments of any proposed locations except for Bermuda. All sites would have facilities for telemetry, voice communications with the pilot, and teletype (wire or radio) communications with centers in the United States for primary tracking. The tracking sites would provide the Mercury Control Center at Cape Canaveral, Florida, with trajectory predictions; landing-area predictions; and vehicle, systems, and pilot conditions.
- After the initial meeting with contractors, plans were made for the Project Mercury animal payload program with monkeys used to cover nine flights, involving four different rocket launch vehicles (Little Joe, Redstone, Jupiter and Atlas).
- The U.S. Navy Chief of Naval Operations directed the Atlantic Fleet to support Project Mercury's recovery operations.
- A superbolt, more powerful than an ordinary lightning bolt, struck a cornfield near Leland, Illinois, leaving a crater 1 foot (0.30 m) deep, and breaking windows in homes almost 1 mile (1.6 km) away.
- Born: Juha Kankkunen, Finnish rally car driver and four-time world champion; in Laukaa

== April 3, 1959 (Friday) ==
- Vito Genovese, New York Mafia don and boss of the Genovese Crime Family, was convicted on federal narcotics conspiracy charges, but was released three days later after posting $150,000 bond.
- Elmer David Bruner died in the electric chair at the West Virginia Penitentiary in Moundsville, West Virginia, becoming the last person to be executed in that state, which abolished the death penalty in 1965.
- Born: David Hyde Pierce, American television actor known for Frasier; in Saratoga Springs, New York

== April 4, 1959 (Saturday) ==
- In a speech at Gettysburg College, U.S. President Dwight D. Eisenhower announced the first American commitment to keeping South Vietnam as a separate, non-Communist nation. "We reach the inescapable conclusion", said Eisenhower, "that our own national interests demand some help from us in sustaining in Vietnam the morale, the economic progress, and the military strength necessary to its continued existence in freedom."

== April 5, 1959 (Sunday) ==
- In Dortmund, West Germany, Rong Guotuan of Communist China defeated Ferenc Sido of Hungary to win the 25th World Table Tennis Championships, becoming the first Chinese player to do so.
- At the Southmoor Hotel in Chicago, black nationalist S.A. Davis, Chairman of the Joint Council of Repatriation, and eight of his associates met with George Lincoln Rockwell, white supremacist, and two of his associates in the American Nazi Party, to discuss a joint resolution in support of government-supported "repatriation" of African-Americans to a homeland on the African continent.

== April 6, 1959 (Monday) ==
- The Academy Awards ceremony took place at the RKO Pantages Theatre in Hollywood. Gigi won a record nine Oscars, including the award for Best Picture.
- Texas A&M University won in its fight against admitting women as students, as the U.S. Supreme Court dismissed an appeal by two women from a state court decision.
- Robert Sobukwe founded the Pan Africanist Congress as a black African alternative to the African National Congress.
- Hal Holbrook began his career of portraying a retired author, with his first performance of Mark Twain Tonight! at the Forty-first Street Theatre in Manhattan.
- The "escudo" was created as the new currency of the South American nation of Chile, with the signing by President Jorge Alessandri of Law 13,305 in response to runaway inflation. The new escudo was worth 1,000 old pesos, which would be completely replaced by January 1, 1960. The "new peso" would replace the Chilean escudo on September 29, 1975, at a rate of one new peso for every 1,000 escudos (or every one million "old pesos").

== April 7, 1959 (Tuesday) ==
- In Washington, the National Safety Council first warned parents about the risk of suffocation posed by plastic bags, particularly those used by dry cleaners. The AMA, as well as a trade association of dry-cleaning stores, joined in the warning. In January, Dr. Paul B. Jarrett of Phoenix had begun a campaign to educate the public after five children had suffocated in the previous year.
- The first photograph of a falling meteorite was taken in Příbram, Czechoslovakia.
- For the first time, a radar signal was sent between the Earth and the Sun. A team led by Dr. Von R. Eshleman, Lt. Col. Robert C. Barthle, and Dr. Philip B. Gallagher, transmitted the beam from Stanford University in Palo Alto, California, and received the return 17 minutes later. The morning experiments were repeated on April 10 and April 12, and the data was published in the journal Science on February 5, 1960.
- By a margin of 386,845 to 314,380 voters in Oklahoma elected to repeal the state's constitutional prohibition on the sale of alcohol, leaving Mississippi as the only dry American state. Liquor sales began on September 1.
- The town of Jackpot, Nevada, was founded. Located a few miles south of the border with Idaho, the gambling center was created after Idaho banned gambling.
- Israel created the first Holocaust Memorial Day by vote of the Knesset in Tel Aviv, to be observed on the 27th day of Nisan, which fell on May 5 in 1959. If the 27th falls on a Friday, the observation is held on the 26th. In 2009, Nisan 27 was on April 21.
- The Philippine government began use of the presidential yacht, the R.P.S. Lapu-Lapu (PY-77).

== April 8, 1959 (Wednesday) ==
- Grace Hopper and others met at the University of Pennsylvania to discuss a computer programming language that would be more applicable to programming for business than FORTRAN. Following the meeting, a task force overseen by Hopper created COmmon Business Oriented Language, or COBOL.
- The Inter-American Development Bank was founded in Washington as an initiative by the Organization of American States to distribute financial aid to OAS member nations.
- As many as 250 delegates to a conference of the AFL-CIO got food poisoning after eating dinner on board a train bound from Toledo to Washington.
- One day before the press conference introducing the members of NASA Astronaut Group 1, USAF test pilot Capt. Halvor M. Ekeren Jr., who had been one of the 32 astronaut finalists earlier in the year, died in the crash of his Convair JF-106A-50 Delta Dart near Indian Springs AFB in Nevada.
- Died: Marios Makrionitis, 45, Roman Catholic Archbishop of Athens, was killed in an automobile accident.

== April 9, 1959 (Thursday) ==
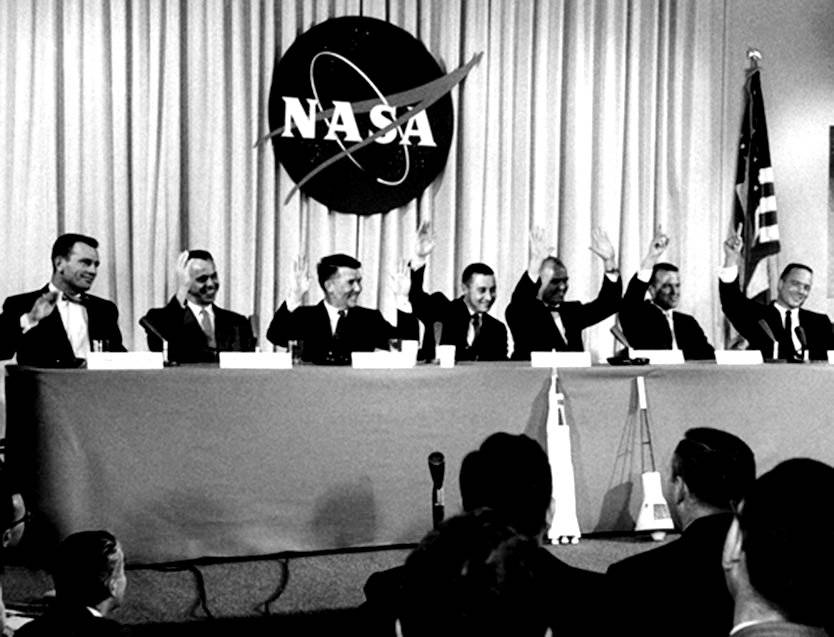
April 9, 1959: Mercury Seven press conference

- NASA Administrator T. Keith Glennan introduced the Mercury Seven astronauts at a press conference in Washington, D.C. By rank, they were Lt. Col. John Glenn, Lieutenant Commanders Wally Schirra and Alan Shepard, Air Force Captains Gordon Cooper, Gus Grissom and Deke Slayton, and Navy Lt. Scott Carpenter.
- The first hijacking of an airliner to Cuba took place after six Haitian rebels killed the pilot of a Coahata Airlines flight bound from Aux Cayes to Port-au-Prince, then flew the DC3 to Havana.
- Comedian Lenny Bruce made his national television debut, as a guest on The Steve Allen Show.
- The Boston Celtics beat the Minneapolis Lakers 118–113 to sweep the four-game NBA championship series, in the first of the Celtics-Lakers title matches.
- Actor George Reeves, who portrayed Superman on television, was injured when the brakes failed on his Jaguar automobile, and he crashed into a light pole near his home in Beverly Hills. Reeves suffered regular headaches after the accident, and would die from a gunshot wound on June 16.

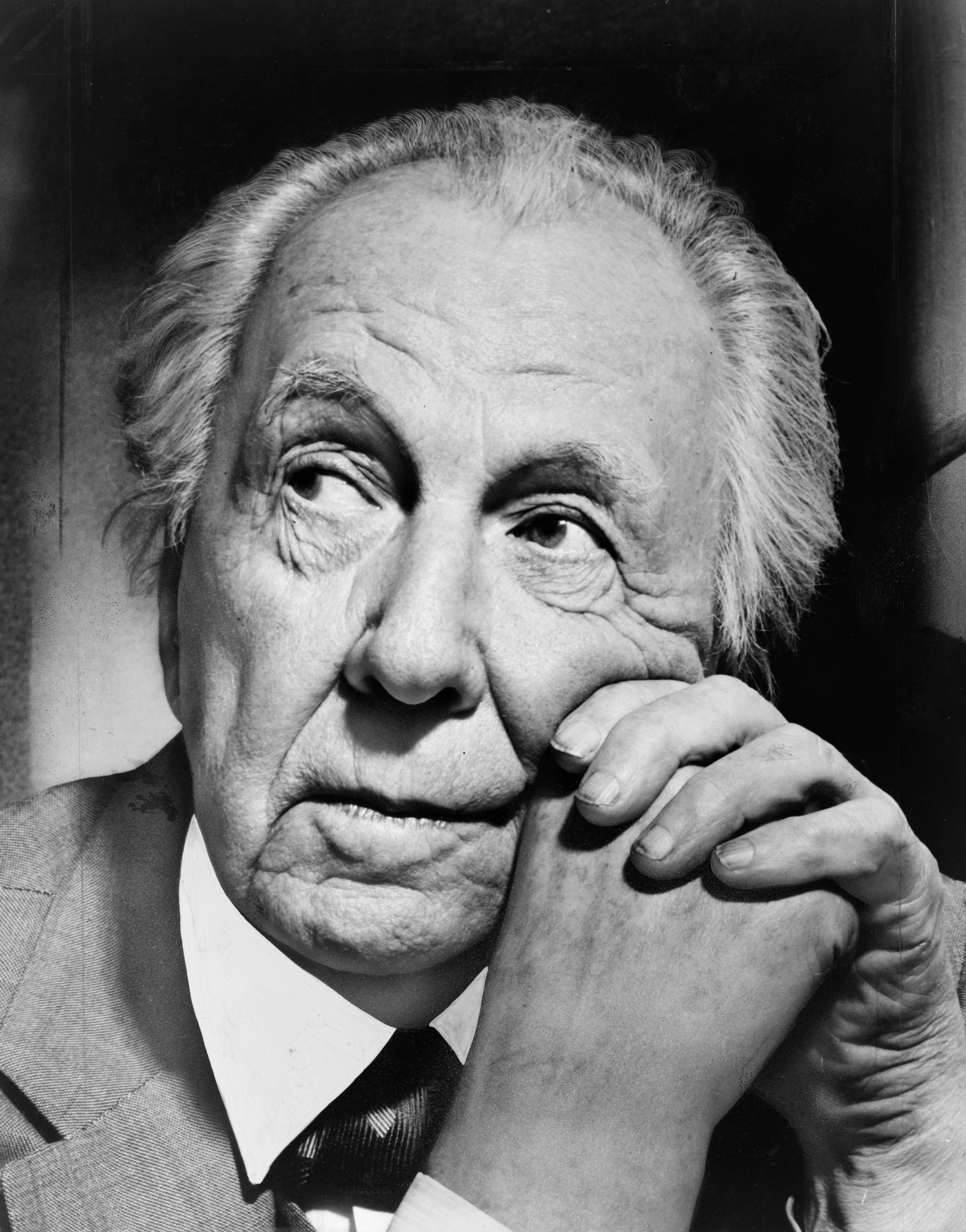
Frank Lloyd Wright

- Died: Frank Lloyd Wright, 91, American architect, died in Phoenix, three days after intestinal surgery.

== April 10, 1959 (Friday) ==
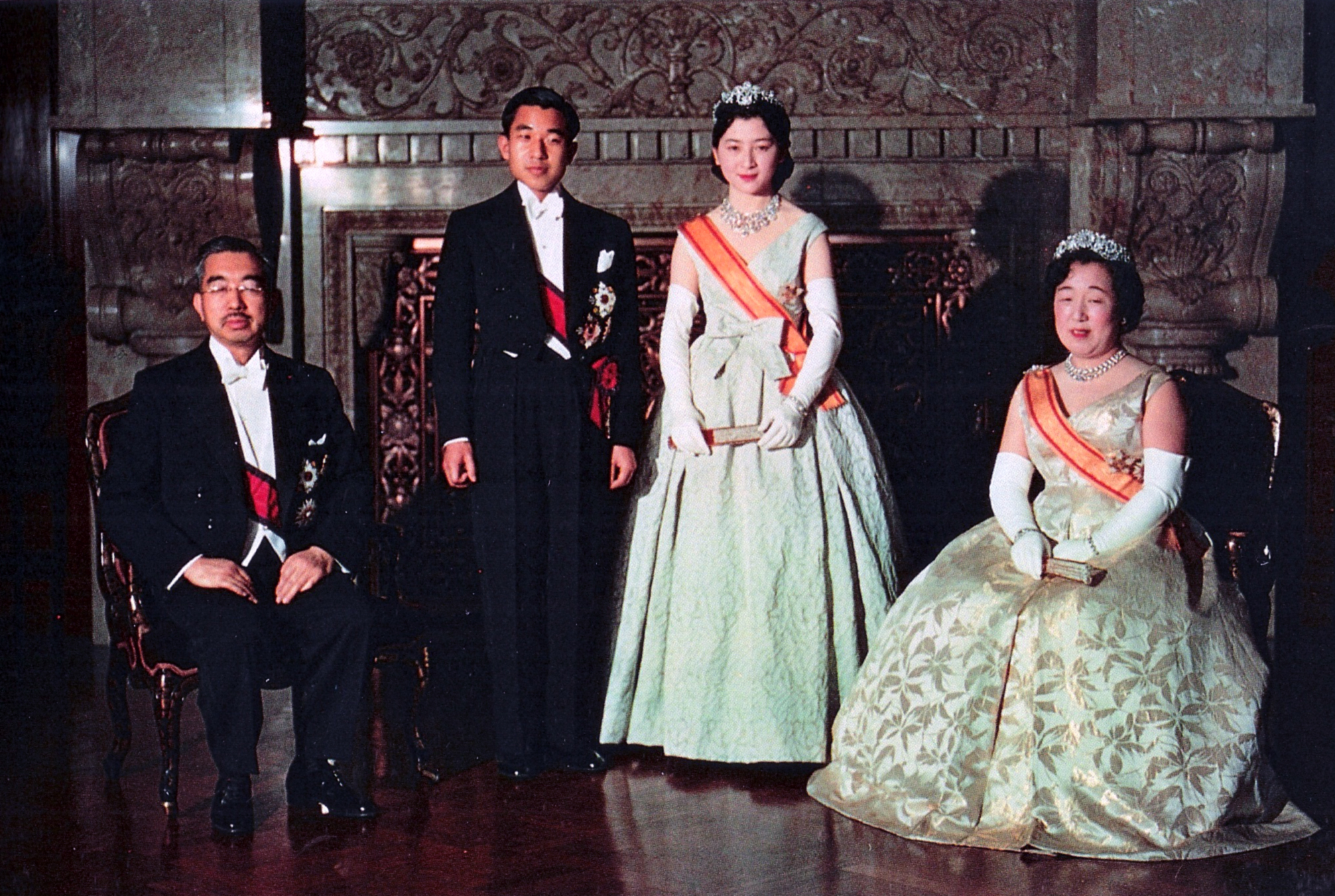
April 10, 1959: Crown Prince Akihito marries Michiko Shōda in Japan's royal wedding

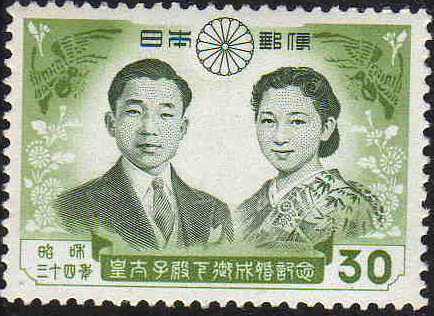
30-yen commemorative stamp

- Japan's Crown Prince Akihito married Michiko Shōda in a 15-minute Shinto ceremony, at 10:00 a.m. in Tokyo. She was the first commoner to marry into the Imperial House of Japan. After the wedding, Kensetsu Makayama, 19, tried to climb into the royal coach after throwing a rock at the couple.
- Thirty-four people, mostly children, were killed by a bomb left over from World War II. Fishermen had retrieved the 500-pound (230 kg) weapon from a sunken ship in Lingayen Gulf near Dagupan in the Philippines, and were taking apart the device while curious onlookers watched.
- A sniper attempted to shoot Virginia Governor J. Lindsay Almond outside the Executive Mansion in Richmond. The Governor was unhurt, and the would-be assassin was not found.
- Born:
  - Kenneth "Babyface" Edmonds, songwriter/musician; in Indianapolis
  - Brian Setzer, American rock musician for the band Stray Cats; in Massapequa, New York
- Died: Leonard Shockley, 17, became the last juvenile to be executed in the United States. Shockley, who was 16 when he committed a murder by cutting the throat of a shopkeeper, was put to death in the gas chamber at the Maryland State Penitentiary at 10:02 pm. For nearly 40 years, he would also be the last person to be executed for a crime committed as a minor. On February 4, 1999, Sean Sellers would be put to death in Oklahoma for a 1985 murder committed when he was 16.

== April 11, 1959 (Saturday) ==
- Bill Pickering, director of the Jet Propulsion Laboratory, announced America's plans for a crewed lunar mission "within the next 5 to 10 years". Speaking to a group of Caltech alumni, Pickering said that the Nova rocket, once perfected, would "be able to transport two or three men to the moon and return them to earth."

== April 12, 1959 (Sunday) ==
- The body of former Haitian presidential candidate Clement Jumelle was hijacked from the funeral procession in Port-au-Prince. It has been speculated that Haitian dictator François Duvalier wanted to use the brain in a voodoo ceremony.
- The myth of the Chinese word for "crisis" was perpetuated by Senator John F. Kennedy, who said, "When written in Chinese, the word crisis is composed of two characters—one represents danger and the other represents opportunity."
- NASA's STG conducted the second full-scale beach abort test on Wallops Island. After a deliberate thrust misalignment of 1 inch (25 mm) was programmed into the escape combination, the test was fully successful. Two further tests were conducted the next day.

== April 13, 1959 (Monday) ==
- The United States and Britain asked the Soviet Union to join in a moratorium on above-ground nuclear weapons testing.
- Singer Mario Lanza gave his final concert, in Kiel, West Germany. He would die on October 7 of the same year.
- The United States launched the Discoverer II satellite from Vandenberg Air Force Base in California at 1:20 pm. The capsule was successfully ejected but lost after a timing error sent it to Norway rather than Hawaii.
- NASA asked the U.S. Navy for use of the "human centrifuge" at the Aviation Medical Acceleration Laboratory (AMAL) at Johnsville, Pennsylvania, for the Mercury program.
- Died: Eduard van Beinum, 57, Dutch conductor, collapsed of a heart attack while rehearsing with the Concertgebouw Orchestra in Amsterdam. Van Beinum was reportedly leading the orchestra in playing Brahms' First Symphony in C Minor "when he lowered his baton and called for a pause", then fell to the floor.

== April 14, 1959 (Tuesday) ==
- The Robert A. Taft Memorial, a carillon with 27 bells, was dedicated in Washington. President Eisenhower and former president Hoover delivered remarks before a crowd of 5,000 people.
- The Atlas D missile was launched from Cape Canaveral in its first test. With a range of 10,360 miles (16,670 km), the missile could travel farther than any previously produced in the United States. The rocket exploded soon after launch, as did two other Atlas D launches, until succeeding on July 29, 1959.
- The Grumman OV-1 Mohawk, built as the U.S. Army's reconnaissance airplane, made its first flight.

== April 15, 1959 (Wednesday) ==
- Four men hijacked a Cuban airliner to the United States. They landed the plane at 8:55 a.m. in Miami.
- Fidel Castro arrived in Washington for an 11-day tour of the United States.
- U.S. Secretary of State John Foster Dulles resigned after the metastasizing of his abdominal cancer. Choking back tears, President Dwight D. Eisenhower announced the news at a press conference in Augusta, Georgia.
- Hundreds turned out in Oklahoma City to see whether Otis T. Carr would launch a flying saucer to fly 400 feet (120 m) off the ground. Carr rescheduled the launch several times, but it never took place.
- Born: Emma Thompson, English actress, in Paddington, London

== April 16, 1959 (Thursday) ==
- The United States deployed the first Thor missiles in Great Britain, under the command of Royal Air Force crews. The nuclear warheads on the missiles remained under American control.
- At an altitude of 11,700 metres (38,400 ft), an Air France flight from Paris to Dijon lost power 265 kilometres (165 mi) from its destination. The crew glided the plane the rest of the way.
- NASA asked the U.S. Air Force to furnish two TF-102B and two T-33 aircraft for the Project Mercury astronauts for training in order to maintain their proficiency in high performance aircraft.
- Voters in Harlem Heights, a neighborhood near Chicago, elected in a referendum to incorporate as the city of Palos Heights, Illinois.
- Rioters at the Montana State Prison in Deer Lodge took 16 guards and 7 other people hostage. The disturbance broke out at 4:30. Two hostages were released the next day.
- "Judgment at Nuremberg" was telecast as a live television broadcast on Playhouse 90. According to reviewer William Ewald, who described "one of the most disturbing cases of commercial censorship," commenting that "part of a Claude Rains speech which referred to Nazi 'gas chambers' was blipped out. Why? Well, one of the sponsors of Playhouse 90 is the American Gas Assn. Shame on everybody concerned." It would later be adapted to a 1961 film.

== April 17, 1959 (Friday) ==
- Twenty-six people died in the crash of a Mexican C-46 airplane, en route from Mexicali to Guayama. The Tigres Voladores Airlines plane exploded in midair as it made its approach.
- Born: Sean Bean, English actor; in Handsworth, South Yorkshire

== April 18, 1959 (Saturday) ==
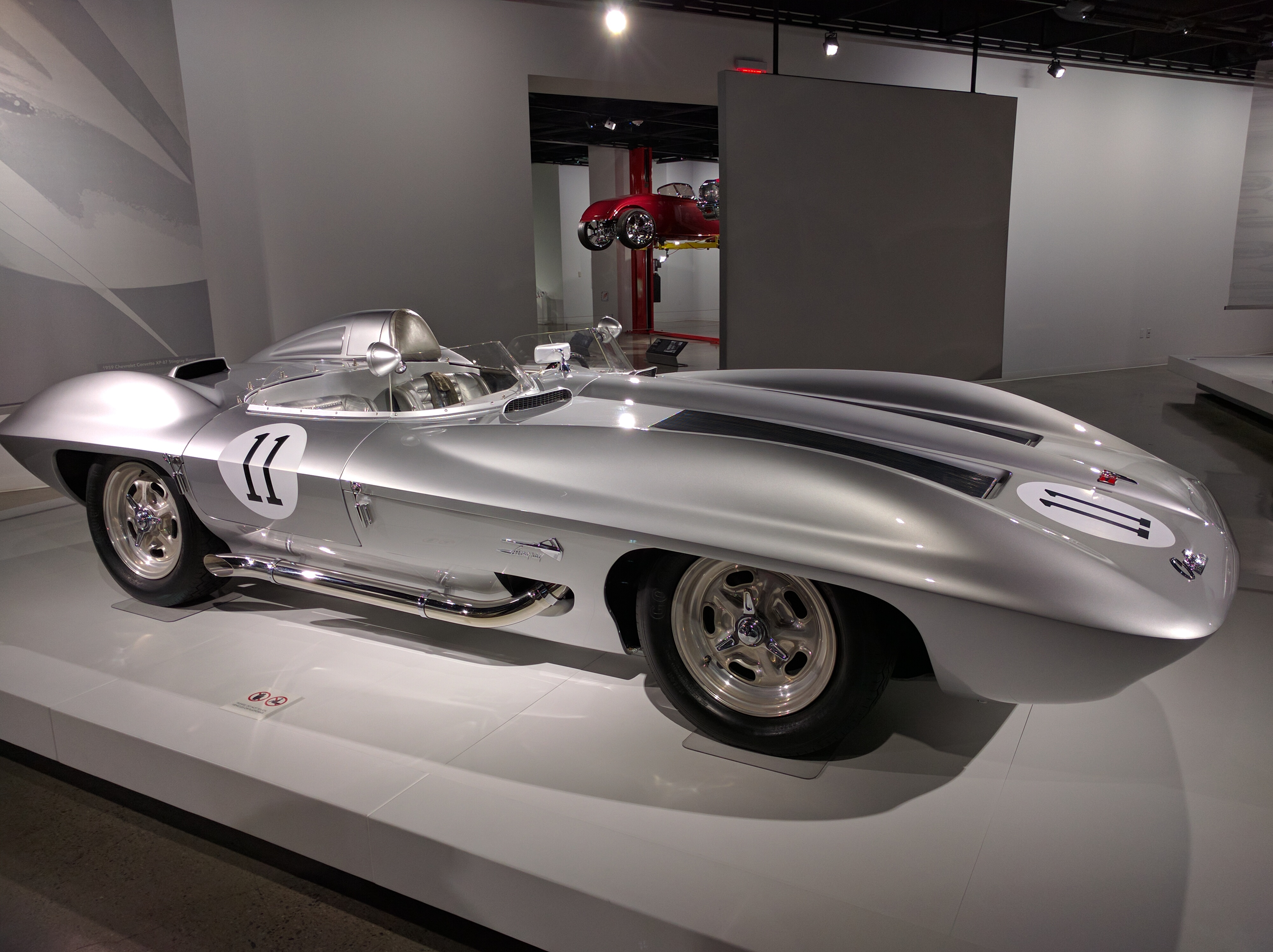
Corvette Stingray

- The Corvette Stingray was introduced, racing at Marlboro Raceway and finishing in fourth place.
- The Montreal Canadiens beat the Toronto Maple Leafs 5–3 to win their fourth straight Stanley Cup, in the fifth game of the series.
- At 3:45 a.m., fifty members of the Montana National Guard stormed the Montana State Prison at Deer Lodge, rescued the 16 remaining hostages, and ended the prison revolt there after 36 hours.

== April 19, 1959 (Sunday) ==
- For the first time in Switzerland's history, a woman was allowed to cast a vote. Although the nation's male voters had rejected universal suffrage on February 1, the Swiss canton of Vaud approved female participation in local elections. Mrs. Ida Pidoux became the first woman to exercise the new right, casting a ballot for candidates of her choice in Oulens-sur-Lucens.
- Fidel Castro appeared on Meet the Press and denied that Cuba would turn to communism. Later that day, the Cuban premier met with U.S. Vice-President Richard M. Nixon.
- Born: Donald Markwell, Australian social scientist and educator, and Warden of Rhodes House, Oxford; in Quilpie, Queensland
- Died: Alfred Steele, 57, Chairman of the Pepsi Cola Company and husband of Joan Crawford. Christina Crawford would later claim, in an updated version of Mommie Dearest, that she believed that her mother murdered her stepfather.

== April 20, 1959 (Monday) ==
- The Ilyushin Il-18, a turboprop airliner that could carry 95 passengers, was put into service by the Soviet national airline, Aeroflot.

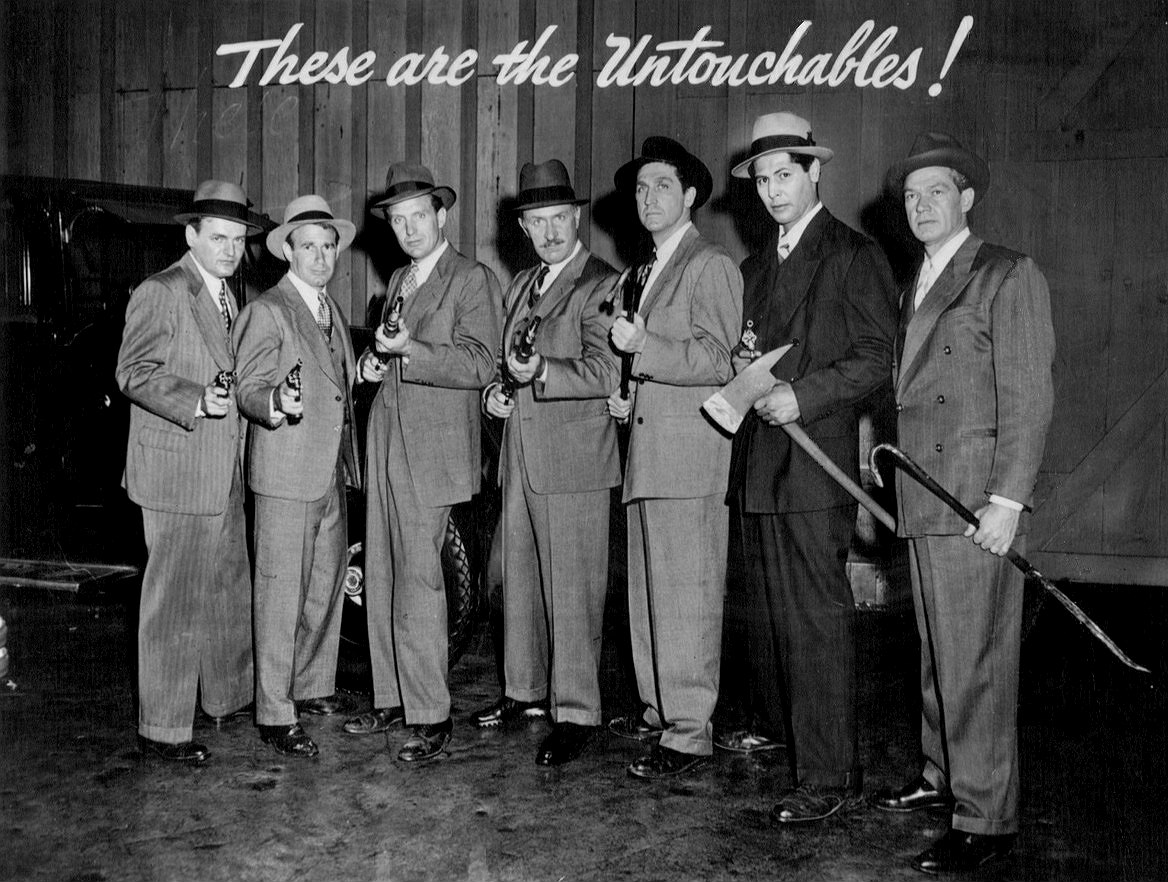
Promo for the CBS pilot

- The pilot for what would become the ABC television series The Untouchables was first shown, appearing in the first of two installments as part of the Westinghouse Desilu Playhouse anthology series CBS. The show was based on the autobiography of retired federal agent Eliot Ness, whose role was played by actor Robert Stack. The ABC network picked up the contract to make a regular series that would premiere on October 15.
- Born: Clint Howard, American film and television actor; in Burbank, California
- Died: Morris K. Jessup, 59, American mathematician, astronomer, and authority on UFOs, was found dead in his car from carbon monoxide poisoning, an apparent suicide, although some conspiracy theorists believe that he was murdered.

== April 21, 1959 (Tuesday) ==
- Alfred Dean set a record by catching a 2,664-pound (1,208 kg) great white shark off the coast of Ceduna, South Australia.
- The tradition of a cannon firing at noon in Rome was started again after a 20-year hiatus.

== April 22, 1959 (Wednesday) ==
- In a game between the Kansas City Athletics and the Chicago White Sox, the Sox scored 11 runs in the seventh inning on only one base hit, and went on to win 20–6. John Callison singled to bring in two players who had reached base on Athletics' errors. After the bases were loaded, eight other players (including Callison) scored from third base by a player being walked, while another scored from third after a batter was struck by a pitch.
- In 1955, Florence Houteff, whose husband Victor had founded the Branch Davidian sect in Waco, Texas, had predicted that God would establish the Kingdom of Palestine on April 22, 1959. The prophecy failed, but the Davidians continued, dying in a fire at Waco in 1993.
- Norman Rosen filed a patent for the mesh crib bumper, designed to prevent infant suffocation by providing an alternative to the traditional cloth or vinyl sides within a crib. Rosen would receive U.S. Patent No. 3,018,492 on January 30, 1962, for his invention.

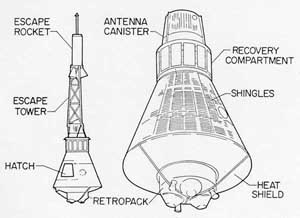
Mercury spacecraft and escape system configuration

- In a meeting at Langley, NASA officials concluded that the tower configuration was the best escape system for the Mercury spacecraft and development would proceed using this concept.
- The second of two recording dates of Miles Davis' Kind of Blue at Columbia Records' 30th Street Studio in New York City.
- Born:
  - Terry Francona, American baseball player, coach, and manager who led the Boston Red Sox to win baseball's World Series in 2004 and 2007, and was recognized as the American League's Manager of the Year in 2013, 2016, and 2022); in Aberdeen, South Dakota
  - Ryan Stiles, American comedian; in Seattle

== April 23, 1959 (Thursday) ==
- The press secretary for Ernesto de la Guardia, the President of Panama, charged that American actor John Wayne was financing an attempt by Roberto Arias to overthrow the government there. Wayne dismissed the accusations as ridiculous, and noted, "Roberto never talked politics, and I never heard him say anything about overthrowing the Panamanian government."

== April 24, 1959 (Friday) ==
- The 34 Shan States were merged into one region by the government of Burma (now Myanmar).
- The bond graph was invented, described as "one of the most effective and most elegant tools for modeling system dynamics".
- DeMarquis D. Wyatt, NASA's Assistant to the Director of Space Flight Development, testified before Congress in support of a request for $3 million in Fiscal Year 1960 for research into techniques and problems of space rendezvous, which would be a goal of Project Gemini.
- Your Hit Parade was broadcast for the last time.
- Died: Omaha, 27, American thoroughbred racehorse and winner of the 1935 Triple Crown, died on a farm in Nebraska City, Nebraska. The horse was buried somewhere on the Ak-Sar-Ben Raceway grounds, but the location has been lost.

== April 25, 1959 (Saturday) ==
- The St. Lawrence Seaway opened at 8:00 a.m.. The icebreaker D'Iberville was at the front of 70 ships that would sail from the Atlantic Ocean to Lake Ontario, starting at Montreal. At the same time, 600 miles (970 km) away in Ogdensburg, New York, 19 cargo ships began the journey from the other end of the seaway. The project had taken five years and cost $475,000,000 with a majority of the funding from Canada. The Seaway was dedicated on June 26, 1959.
- At the Nazareth, Pennsylvania, Motor Speedway, 19-year-old Mario Andretti made his racing debut, winning the race in a 1948 Hudson.
- In Poplarville, Mississippi, a lynch mob kidnapped 23-year-old Mack Charles Parker from his jail cell. His body was found on May 4 in the Pearl River, where he was thrown after being tortured and killed.
- A force of about 80 rebels invaded Panama from the Caribbean Sea in an attempt to overthrow the government there. Although Cuban revolutionary leader Fidel Castro denounced the attack along with other OAS members, it was alleged that he had sponsored the attack.

== April 26, 1959 (Sunday) ==
- The Caravelle jet airliner, produced by the French manufacturer Sud Aviation, made its first commercial flight as the SE 210 began service with Scandinavian Airlines System.
- Reds pitcher Willard Schmidt became the first major league baseball player to be hit by a pitch twice in the same inning in a game against the Milwaukee Braves, once by Lew Burdette and once by Bob Rush. Later, he was struck by a line drive hit by Johnny Logan. Only two other major leaguers have repeated the result, Frank Thomas of the Mets in 1962, and Brady Anderson in 1999.
- Born:
  - John Corabi, heavy metal guitarist for Mötley Crüe; in Philadelphia
  - Pedro Pierluisi, American politician who served as Puerto Rico's non-voting delegate to the United States House of Representatives from 2009 to 2017, and who was sworn in temporarily as Governor of Puerto Rico in August 2019 before his appointment as to the position was annulled five days later; in San Juan, Puerto Rico
- Died: Raden Mas Soewardi Soerjaningrat (Ki Hajar Dewantara), 70, the first Education Minister for the Republic of Indonesia, as well as an independence activist, died in Yogyakarta and was buried in Taman Wijaya Brata cemetery.

== April 27, 1959 (Monday) ==
- Liu Shaoqi was named as the new President of China, as Mao Zedong gave up the ceremonial post to concentrate on the job of First Secretary of the Communist Party.
- Philibert Tsiranana was elected the first president of the Malagasy Republic on the island of Madagascar.
- At 7:00 a.m. Eastern time, NBC's national broadcasts were shut down by a walkout of engineering personnel. The dispute arose over the planned airing of a Today show segment that had been recorded without union personnel. Programming resumed three hours later.
- The radio program One Man's Family was broadcast for the last time, after 27 years on NBC radio.
- The seven Project Mercury astronauts reported for duty and their training program was undertaken immediately. Actual training began the next day. Within 3 months the astronauts were acquainted with the various facets of the Mercury program.
- Born: Sheena Easton, Scottish-born pop singer; as Sheena Shirley Orr in Bellshill, North Lanarkshire

== April 28, 1959 (Tuesday) ==
- Former President Harry S Truman told students at Columbia University that he had made the decision to drop nuclear weapons on Hiroshima and on Nagasaki because an invasion would have cost millions of lives.
- Casa de las Americas was founded in Cuba by order of Fidel Castro.
- The Vatican announced that Roman Catholics worldwide would receive dispensation to eat meat on Friday during the May Day holiday.
- The U.S. Senate confirmed Clare Boothe Luce as ambassador to Brazil by a 79–11 vote, in spite of efforts by Senator Wayne Morse to block the nomination. In thanking the Senate, Mrs. Luce then caused an uproar when she said in a statement, "My difficulties, of course, go some years back and began when Senator Wayne Morse was kicked in the head by a horse", referring to a 1951 accident in which the Senator's jaw had been broken, and calls were made for her resignation. Ambassador Luce quit on May 1. During the debate, Senator Everett Dirksen made a memorable gaffe in defending Mrs. Luce, saying "Why thresh old straws or beat an old bag of bones?"

== April 29, 1959 (Wednesday) ==
- The crash of an Iberia Airlines DC-3 killed all 28 people on board, including Joaquín Blume, 25, the 1957 European gymnastics champion. Blume and four other gymnasts had boarded the flight in Barcelona en route to Madrid and were scheduled to compete in a meet in the Canary Islands. Flying in a storm, the twin-engine plane struck the side of the 5,900-foot (1,800 m) high Toba Peak in the Sierra de Valdemeca range, at a location near the city of Cuenca.
- The Las Vegas Convention Center opened.
- The fraternity Phi Kappa Theta was created by the merger of Phi Kappa and Theta Kappa Phi.

== April 30, 1959 (Thursday) ==
- The Florianturm, a 720-foot (220-meter) television tower, opened in Dortmund, West Germany, to coincide with an international horticultural festival. Opening that day at the 450-foot (140 m) level was the world's first revolving restaurant.
- Félix Houphouët-Boigny was inaugurated as the first African Prime Minister of Côte d'Ivoire.
- The Convair B-36 Peacemaker, in operation since 1946, was flown for the last time.
- The Lockheed Electra made its first flight, tested for delivery to Western Airlines.
- Born:
  - Stephen Harper, 22nd Prime Minister of Canada from 2006 to 2015; in Toronto
  - Pamela Rabe, Canadian-born Australian stage actress; in Oakville, Ontario
