= Thom Ross =

American sculptor

- Born: 1952 (age 73–74); San Francisco, California, US
- Style: installation art book illustration

Thom Ross is an American artist specializing painting, book illustrations, and installation art featuring life-sized cutout figures depicting famous people and historical events.

== Biography ==
Ross was born in San Francisco, California, in 1952, and raised in Sausalito. As a child he became interested in the history of the American Old West by watching television shows such as Bonanza, Rawhide, and Have Gun – Will Travel, as well as John Wayne films. In 1974 he earned a degree in fine arts from California State University, Chico.

Ross had what he describes as an "epiphany" on June 25, 1976, at the hundredth anniversary commemoration of Custer's Last Stand at the Battle of Little Bighorn, after sitting through a windstorm and observing protesters from the American Indian Movement as well as supporters of General George Armstrong Custer. He decided as an artist to portray iconic American people and events in new ways to bring out a more complex story than the traditional historical myths. He soon moved to Jackson Hole, Wyoming. His first of two daughters was born in 1984. He subsequently lived in Vermont and in Palm Springs, California, supporting himself as a waiter in order to paint. He moved to Ballard, Washington in 1991. Most recently he has relocated to Lamy, New Mexico where he lives in a house modeled after the Alamo, and opened his own art gallery in Santa Fe, New Mexico.

He participated in the American Experience episode "Butch Cassidy and the Sundance Kid: The Last Outlaws".

== Works ==
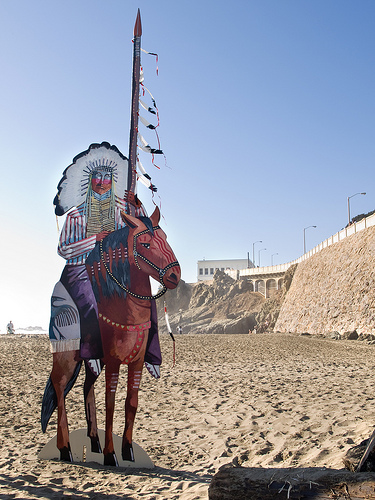
Buffalo Bill's Wild West Show at Ocean Beach, California in 2008

Ross works in various media including Painting, book illustration, and life-sized recreations of historical scenes. Favorite subjects include Cowboys, Indians, and historical battles in the American Indian Wars. Ross has illustrated at least 20 books, including a history of baseball. In 2001 Ross published a book, Gunfight at the O.K. Corral in Words and Pictures. In 2002 Ross illustrated the 100th anniversary edition of Owen Wister's novel, The Virginian.

Ross' first plywood installation was a 1976 cutout of Clint Eastwood, which he and a friend placed as a prank above a railroad trestle to recreate a scene from Dirty Harry in the location where the scene had been filmed five years earlier. In 1983 Ross created "154 Nevermore", an installation of 154 plywood ravens on a highway in Jackson, Wyoming (recreated in steel in 2000). In 1984, Ross created "the Catch", a diorama for the Baseball Hall of Fame illustrating a legendary catch with the same nickname, by Willie Mays in the 1954 World Series. He created a new version of the work in 2004, and displayed it in various locations in New York City. In 1998 Ross created "The Defining Moment" for SAFECO Field, a tableau of 11 steel cutouts of a Ken Griffey, Junior play in the 1995 baseball playoffs. Ross' 2005 work, "Custer's Last Stand", was a recreation of life-sized warriors riding life-sized horses the Battle of Little Bighorn at the original site at Medicine Tail Coulee in Montana. That exhibit toured Cody, Wyoming, Jackson, Wyoming, and Sun Valley, Idaho. In September, 2008 Ross recreated a 1902 photograph of Buffalo Bill Cody and his "Wild West Show", his traveling troupe of Native Americans, in front of the Cliff House at Ocean Beach.
