= October 1959 =

Month of 1959

<<	October 1959					>>
Su	Mo	Tu	We	Th	Fr	Sa
				1	2	3
4	5	6	7	8	9	10
11	12	13	14	15	16	17
18	19	20	21	22	23	24
25	26	27	28	29	30	31

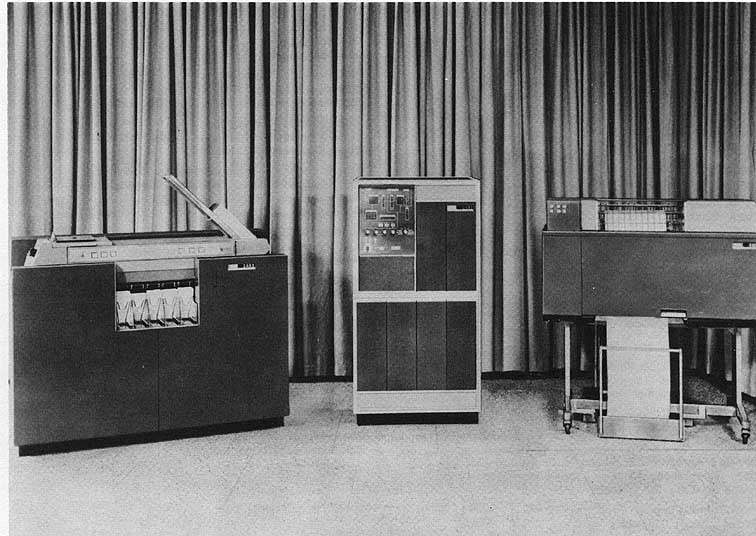
October 5, 1959: IBM 1401, the first business computer, is introduced

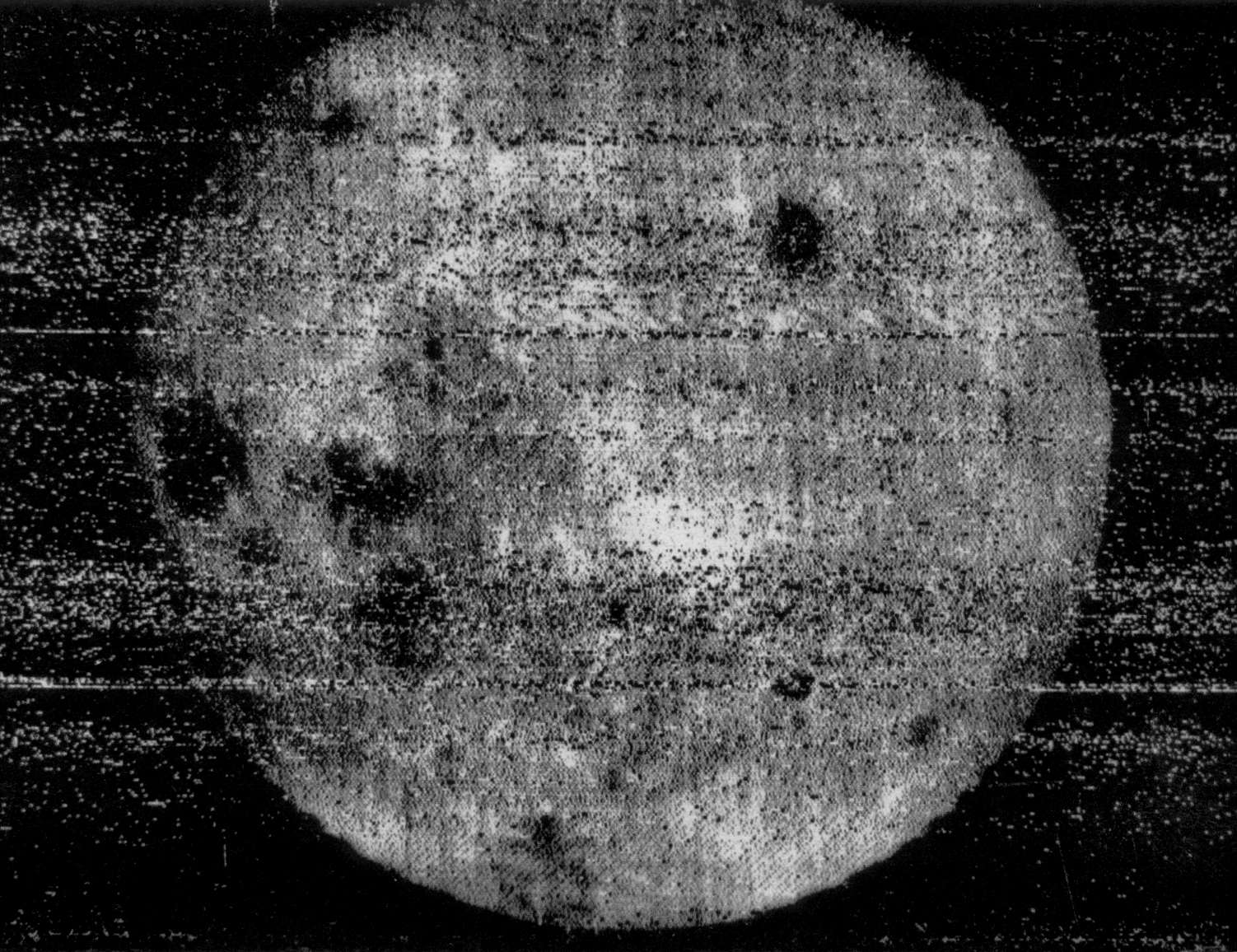
October 26, 1959: Earth's people see the other side of the Moon for the first time

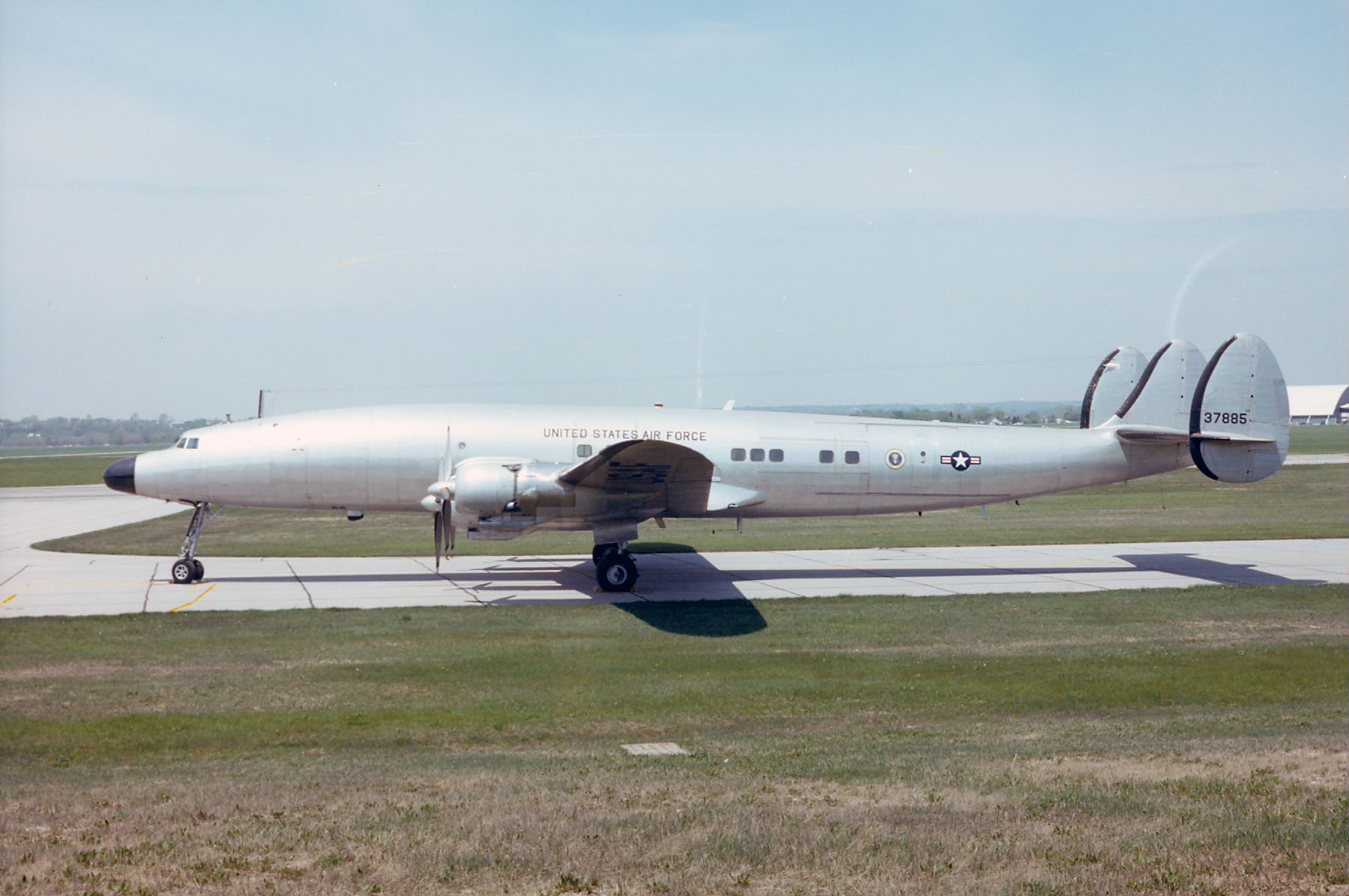
October 25, 1959: The last propeller driven Air Force One flight ends

The following events occurred in October 1959:

== October 1, 1959 (Thursday) ==
- Aleksandr Alekseyev, a Soviet KGB agent and correspondent for TASS, arrived in Cuba to forge a relationship between the U.S.S.R. and the Castro government. By October 12, he had met with Che Guevara, and by October 15 with Fidel Castro, creating a Soviet ally 90 miles (140 km) from the United States.
- NFL Enterprises, the forerunner to NFL Properties, was created as a joint project between Western star Roy Rogers and the owners of the 12 NFL teams. The first licensed product was glassware, to be given away at Standard Oil filling stations.
- NASA approved funds for major changes to the Mercury spacecraft, including installation of an egress hatch, an astronaut observation window and a reefed ringsail landing parachute, as well as redesign of the rate stabilization and control system, the main instrument panel. The original contract with McDonnell had only specified configuration, research and development flight tests for the original spacecraft.
- Born:
  - Brian P. Cleary, American children's author; in Lakewood, Ohio
  - Youssou N'Dour, Senegalese singer; in Dakar

== October 2, 1959 (Friday) ==
- The political system of Panchayati Raj was revived in India, starting with legislation in the State of Rajasthan to allow villages to elect their own local council (Gram Panchayat) to have authority on selected issues. The first new councils were in villages in the Nagaur district.
- A total eclipse of the sun was visible from the northeast United States to West Africa. During the brief time in which the Moon came between the Sun and the Earth, Maurice Allais confirmed the "Allais effect", causing a change in the swing of a pendulum, which he had first observed during a 1954 total eclipse. The point of greatest eclipse was in the Sahara Desert in Mali.
- General Motors introduced the Chevrolet Corvair automobile. The Corvair, subject of Ralph Nader's 1965 book Unsafe at Any Speed, was manufactured until the 1969 model.
- The Twilight Zone debuted on CBS television with the episode "Where Is Everybody?"
- NASA issued specifications for the Mercury spacesuit, with operational research suits for astronaut training and further development, followed by the final Mercury pressure suitconfiguration.

== October 3, 1959 (Saturday) ==
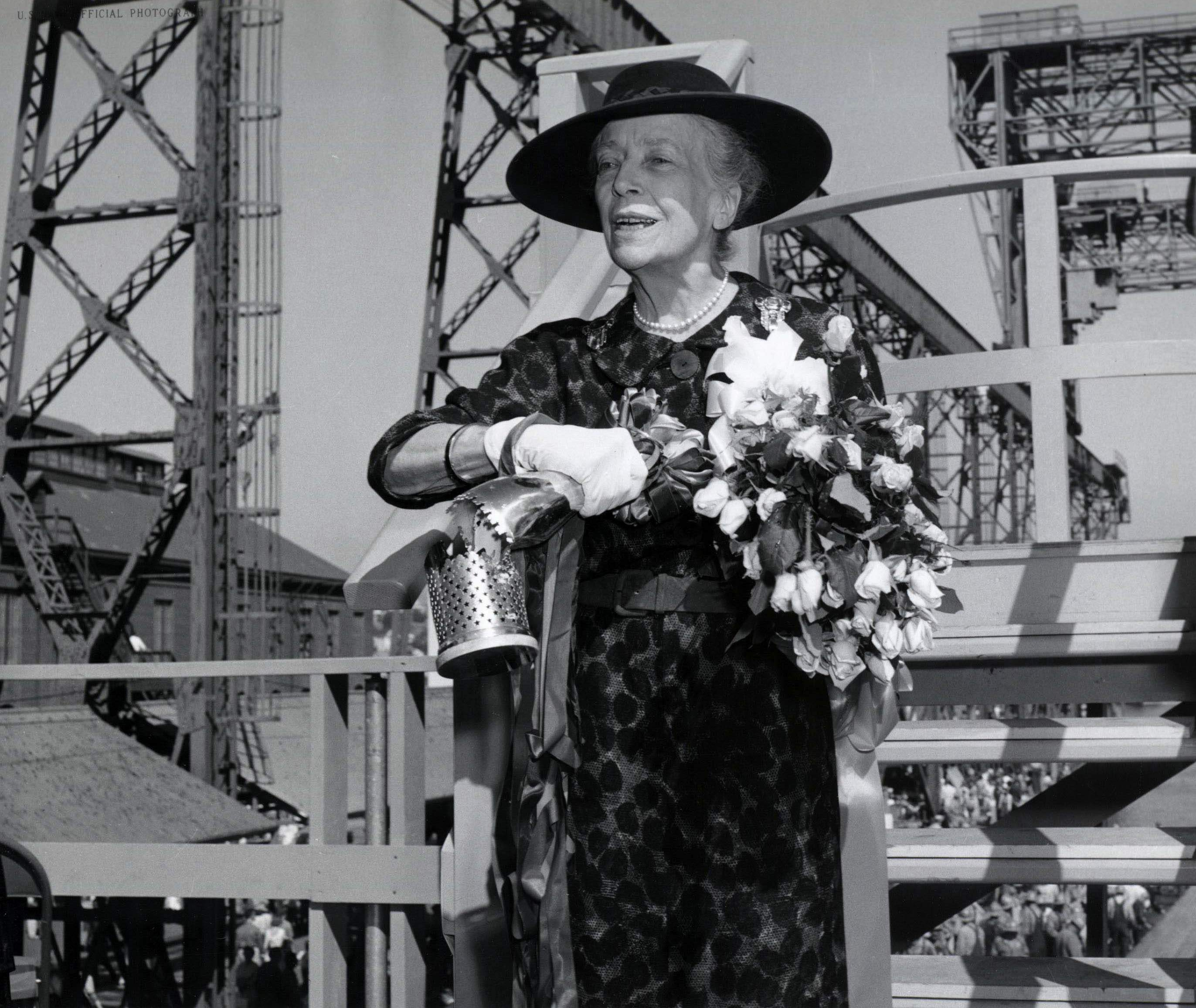
October 3, 1959: Theodore Roosevelt's daughter at the submarine christening

- The ballistic missile submarine, USS Theodore Roosevelt, was launched from Mare Island. Alice Roosevelt Longworth, the 75-year-old daughter of the 26th American president, broke the champagne across the submarine hull on her second attempt.
- Born:
  - Fred Couples, American professional golfer who won the 1992 Masters Tournament; in Seattle
  - Greg Proops, American comedian; in Phoenix
  - Frank Stephenson, Moroccan-born Spanish-American automobile designer known for his designs of cars including the BMW Mini Hatch, the Ferrari F430 and the Maserati MC12; in Casablanca
  - Jack Wagner, American actor known for General Hospital; in Washington, Missouri

== October 4, 1959 (Sunday) ==
- Lunik 3, billed by the Soviet Union as "the first automatic space station", was launched into space. It would orbit the Moon and show a side never before seen by humanity.

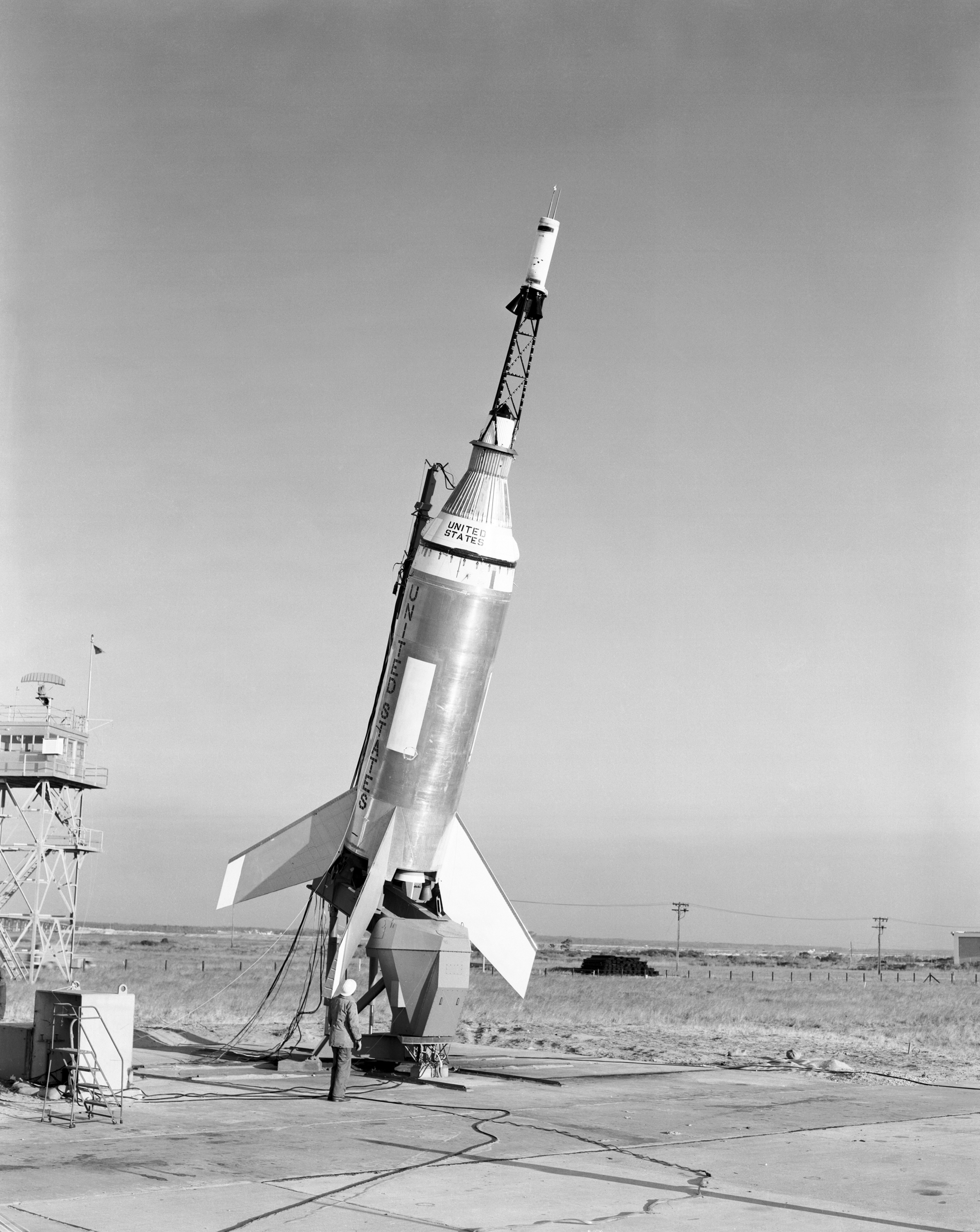
October 4, 1959: Little Joe rocket

- A Little Joe launch vehicle carrying a boilerplate Mercury spacecraft was successfully launched from Wallops Island. The flight, lasting 5 minutes 10 seconds, gained a peak altitude of 37.12 miles (59.74 km), and a range of 79.4 miles (127.8 km). The destruct packages on the rocket were successfully activated well after the flight reached its apex. There was a slight malfunction when ignition of the two second-stage Pollux motors happened before the exact time planned, but the planned trajectory was only slightly affected and the structural test of the vehicle was greater than planned.
- Born: Chris Lowe, British musician for the Pet Shop Boys; in Blackpool, Lancashire

== October 5, 1959 (Monday) ==
- The IBM 1401 computer and data processing system was introduced, providing the first fully transistorized computer intended for business use. The three-piece system, which could be rented for $2,500 a month, had a memory ranging from 1.4 KB to 16K, could read 800 punchcards per minute and could print 600 lines per minute. More than 14,000 units were installed.
- The Mead Johnson food company introduced two powdered nutrition products, both of which became popular, on the same day. Enfamil, which remains an active brand 60 years later, was the first infant formula designed to be "a low protein duplication of mother's milk", while Metrecal was a low-calorie diet food, to be mixed with water for form a milk shake like product and "containing the essential nutrients of protein, carbohydrate, fat, vitamins and minerals" to be consumed four times a day for 900 calories of nutrition.
- Born:
  - Maya Lin, American architect best known for the Vietnam Veterans Memorial; in Athens, Ohio
  - Kelly Joe Phelps, blues musician; in Sumner, Washington (d. 2022)

== October 6, 1959 (Tuesday) ==
- At a congressional subcommittee hearing investigating allegations of fraud on television quiz programs, former game show contestants Herbert Stempel and James Snodgrass revealed that they had been supplied the answers in advance on the show Twenty-One. The two would be portrayed in the film Quiz Show by John Turturro and Douglas McGrath, respectively, in 1994.
- Cambodia filed suit against Thailand in the World Court claiming a violation of its territory by Thai use of Preah Vihear, an 11-century Hindu temple. In 1962, the Court ruled in favor of Cambodia.
- The International Olive Oil Council was created, with 17 member nations, representing 97% of the world's exports of olive oil.
- A record 92,706 fans watched Game 5 of the World Series between the Dodgers and the White Sox, in hopes of seeing the Dodgers win the Series at home. The White Sox won the game, 1 to 0, and the Series then moved to Chicago's Comiskey Park.

== October 7, 1959 (Wednesday) ==
- From 0330 to 0410 GMT, the Lunik 3 probe took the first pictures of the far side of the Moon, 29 images that were later transmitted back to Earth.
- A Taiwanese RB-57 surveillance plane, flying at an altitude of 20,000 metres (66,000 ft), was downed by three V-750 missiles as it flew near Beijing. It was the first time that a surface-to-air missile (SAM) had brought down an aircraft.
- On Baghdad's al-Rashid Street, Iraq's President Abd al-Karim Qasim was ambushed on his way to the East German embassy. The five-man team, led by future Iraqi President Saddam Hussein, killed Qasim's driver and wounded Qasim. One assassin died and Saddam himself was injured, but escaped to a farm. After the U.S. invasion of Iraq in 2003, Saddam fled to the same farm, where he was captured on December 13 of that year.
- The U.S. Court of Claims ruled that the Tlingit and Haida Indian tribes had been the original owners of southeast Alaska and entitled to monetary compensation. An award for $7.5 million was made in 1968.
- Born:
  - Simon Cowell, English television producer and judge (American Idol and Britain's Got Talent);, in Brighton, East Sussex
  - Lourdes Flores, Peruvian presidential candidate 2001 and 2006; in Lima
  - Michael Paré, American film actor (The Philadelphia Experiment); in Brooklyn

Mario Lanza

- Died: Mario Lanza, 38, American tenor, died of a pulmonary embolism

== October 8, 1959 (Thursday) ==
- In the British general election, the Conservatives (led by Prime Minister Harold Macmillan) increased their majority in Parliament, capturing 365 of the 630 seats. Labour had 258 seats, followed by the Liberals (6) and the Independent Conservative Party (1).
- The Los Angeles Dodgers beat the Chicago White Sox 9–3 to win the 1959 World Series in the sixth game. Larry Sherry, the winning pitcher, had saved Games 2, 3 and 4 as well.
- The Central Committee of the Communist Party of the Soviet Union issued "About some changes in History lessons in school", a decree revising the curriculum and textbooks in Soviet schools, with an emphasis on "the inevitability of the collapse of capitalism and the triumph of communism."

== October 9, 1959 (Friday) ==
- Russell Langelle, a CIA agent with a cover as security officer at the Embassy of the United States in Moscow, was arrested as he stepped off a city bus, where he had met Soviet double-agent Pyotr Popov. Langelle was expelled from the Soviet Union, and Popov was later executed for treason.

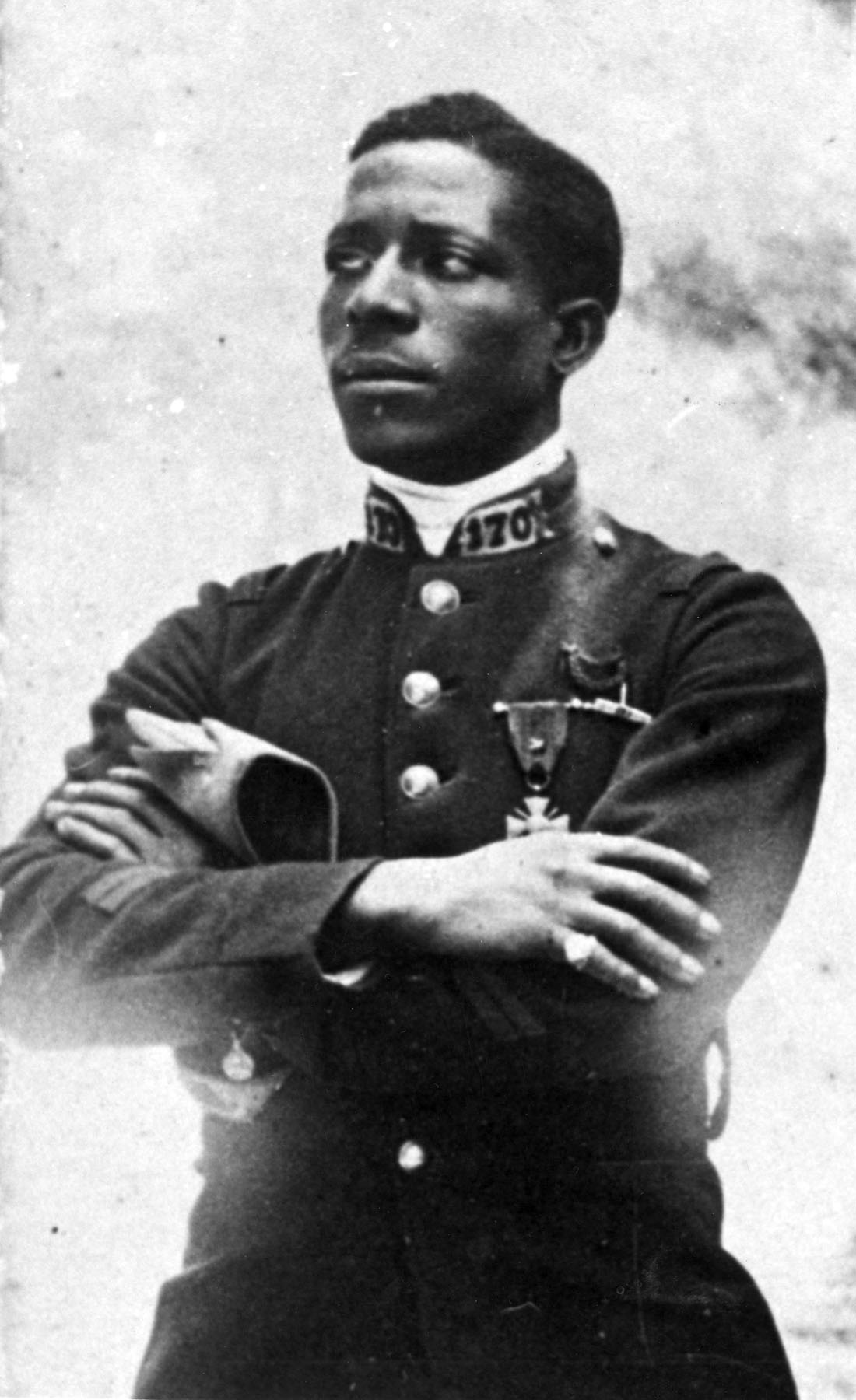
Bullard

- Eugene Bullard, who had been the first African-American military pilot, received the Croix de la Légion d'honneur, France's highest military award, at a ceremony in Paris, for his services to the French Foreign Legion during World War I.
- Died: Shirō Ishii, 67, Japanese germ warfare specialist who was granted immunity from war crimes prosecution

== October 10, 1959 (Saturday) ==
- Fatah, a Palestinian nationalist political party, was founded by Yasser Arafat, Khalil al-Wazir, and others to fight for Palestinian independence. "Fatah" is a reverse acronym for Harakat al Tahir al Filastini.
- A courageous letter of protest from author Viktor Nekrasov appeared in the Soviet weekly Literaturnaya Gazeta, after Nekrasov learned that the city planners of Kiev planned to pave over Babi Yar, site of the 1941 Nazi massacre of more than 30,000 Ukrainians, mostly Jews. Learning that a soccer stadium was to be built there, Nekrasov wrote, "How is this possible? Who could have thought of such a thing? On the site of such a colossal tragedy to make merry and play football? No! This must not be allowed!" Yevgeny Yevtushenko and Anatoly Kuznetsov were inspired by Nekrasov's protest to write their own works about Babi Yar.

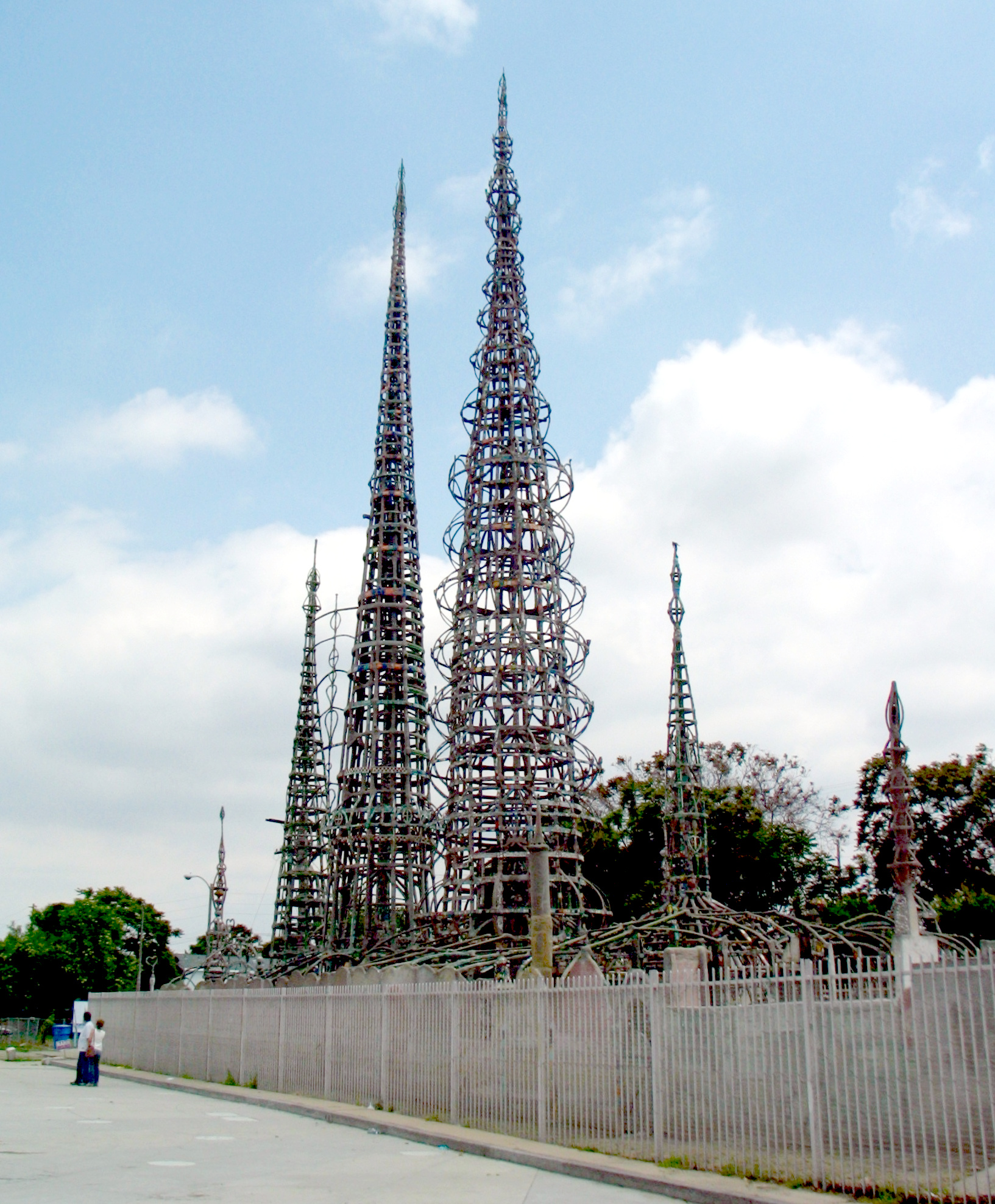
Watts Towers

- The Watts Towers, a metal sculpture by Simon Rodia, withstood a "10,000 pound pull" stress test and earned its right to remain a Los Angeles landmark. The city's Building and Safety Department had ordered the demolition of the landmark, but agreed to let Rodia prove that the 99-foot-tall (30 m) structure would not collapse.
- James Earl Ray was arrested after robbing a supermarket in St. Louis, and given a 20-year sentence in the Missouri State Penitentiary. With more than twelve years remaining on his jail term, Ray would escape on April 23, 1967, and would carry out the assassination of Martin Luther King Jr. the following year.
- Born: Kirsty MacColl, British singer and songwriter; in Croydon, London (killed in boating accident, 2000)

== October 11, 1959 (Sunday) ==
- The Malagasy Republic on the island of Madagascar held elections for the leaders of 739 rural communes, scheduled to take office on January 1. "The great majority of rural voters," a historian would later note, "had no idea what the new communes were for, and most of the officers elected not only were illiterate but lacked a sense of civic responsibility."
- War broke out in the Belgian Congo between two rival tribes, the Lulua and the Baluba, in the city of Luluabourg (now Kananga). Fighting would continue throughout the first campaigns for the first elected legislature in May 1960, in advance of the Congo's independence from Belgium.
- Died:
  - Bert Bell, 64, the Commissioner of the National Football League, died of a heart attack while attending the Eagles-Steelers game in Philadelphia. Bell, who had been Commissioner since 1946, had owned both teams earlier in his career. Sports columnist Red Smith later wrote, "It was like Caruso dying in the third act of Pagliacci". (Note: Pagliacci in fact has only two acts.)
  - Nop Bophann, the editor of Pracheachon, a leftist newsweekly in Cambodia, published by Krom Pracheachon, a front organization for the Kampuchean People's Revolutionary Party, died of his wounds two days after he was shot by the kingdom's security police while leaving his office. One author would comment later, "His death was probably intended as a gesture of reassurance to the Right that, notwithstanding Cambodia's difficulties with America, the communists would be held in check."
  - Rex Griffin, 53, American country singer, died of tuberculosis.

== October 12, 1959 (Monday) ==
- The first successful test of an anti-satellite weapon took place as a missile, fired from a B-47 bomber, passed within 4 miles (6.4 km) of the orbiting satellite Explorer 4, close enough to have destroyed it with a one-megaton nuclear explosion.
- Yuri Gagarin and Georgi Shonin were among the first test pilots selected to be Soviet cosmonauts, following evaluations at the air base at Murmansk. Gagarin would become, on April 12, 1961, the first man in outer space aboard Vostok 1.
- Died: Arnolt Bronnen, 64, Austrian playwright and film director

== October 13, 1959 (Tuesday) ==
- The satellite Explorer 7 was launched, carrying a radiometer invented by Verner E. Suomi, and other devices that permitted the first measurements from space of Earth's radiation and the first climatological studies. This satellite also successfully demonstrated a method of controlling internal temperatures.
- Born: Marie Osmond, American pop singer known for "Paper Roses" and the American TV variety program Donny & Marie; in Ogden, Utah

== October 14, 1959 (Wednesday) ==
- Ruth Urdanivia, a widow in Allentown, Pennsylvania, murdered her five children with overdoses of barbiturates, and unsuccessfully attempted suicide. After being found sane to stand trial, she pleaded guilty and was sentenced to life in prison. She was paroled in 1967.

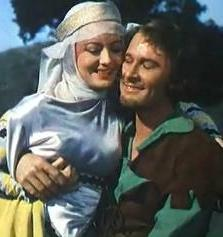
Errol Flynn as Robin Hood, with Olivia de Havilland

- Died:
  - Errol Flynn, 50, Australian-born film actor who popularized the "swashbuckler" action film genre, died of a heart attack
  - Alphonso Trent, 54, American jazz pianist

== October 15, 1959 (Thursday) ==
- Ukrainian nationalist Stepan Bandera was murdered in Munich, West Germany, by Soviet KGB agent Bogdan Stashinsky. The weapon was a gun that fired hydrogen cyanide gas into Bandera's face. Stashinsky, who had killed newspaperman Lev Rebet in the same manner in 1957, swallowed an antidote and escaped.
- The Antarctic Conference opened in Washington with representatives of 12 nations in attendance. The Antarctic Treaty was signed on December 1 and became effective in 1961.
- A B-52F Stratofortress bomber, carrying two nuclear weapons, collided with a KC-135 refueling tanker, causing both planes to explode in mid-air and killing seven of the 12 people on the two airplanes, though four members of the bomber crew were able to parachute to safety. The collision happened over Breckinridge County, Kentucky in the U.S., with the bomber (and its nuclear weapons) crashing on a farm near the community of Glen Dean and the tanker hitting a hillside near McQuady. The two nuclear weapons on the bomber were recovered without release of radiation.

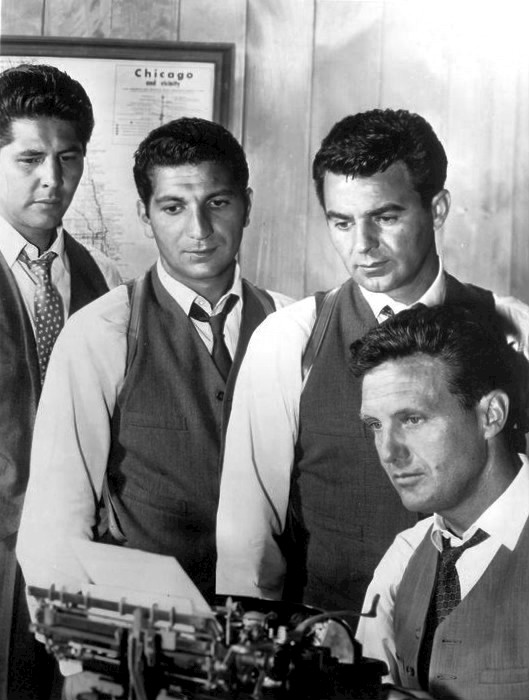
The cast of The Untouchables, with Stack on far right

- The television series The Untouchables, based on the autobiography of federal Prohibition enforcement agent Eliot Ness, premiered on ABC as one of the most violent shows ever to be shown on television, with killings of Chicago gangsters shown on every episode. Starring Robert Stack as Ness, the show would run for four seasons and 118 episodes and was popular in spite of (or perhaps because of) its violent nature.
- Born:
  - Sarah Ferguson, English publishing firm employee who was married to Britain's Prince Andrew from 1986 to 1996 and is popularly known as "Fergie" and is also known for the Budgie the Little Helicopter series of books. After the divorce, she was no longer a member of British royalty but retained nobility as the Duchess of York.
  - Emeril Lagasse, American chef and TV celebrity known generally as "Emeril"; in Fall River, Massachusetts
- Died:
  - Phetsarath Rattanavongsa, 69, former Prime Minister of Laos who served for six months as the head of state after King Sisavang Vong was temporarily removed from office
  - Elliott White Springs, 63, American World War I ace credited with shooting down 16 enemy aircraft

== October 16, 1959 (Friday) ==
- Lee Harvey Oswald arrived in Moscow on a six-day visa, and applied for Soviet citizenship. Coincidentally, he would begin work at the Texas School Book Depository four years to the day later, on October 16, 1963.
- Television was inaugurated in the State of Western Australia as TVW7 went on the air.

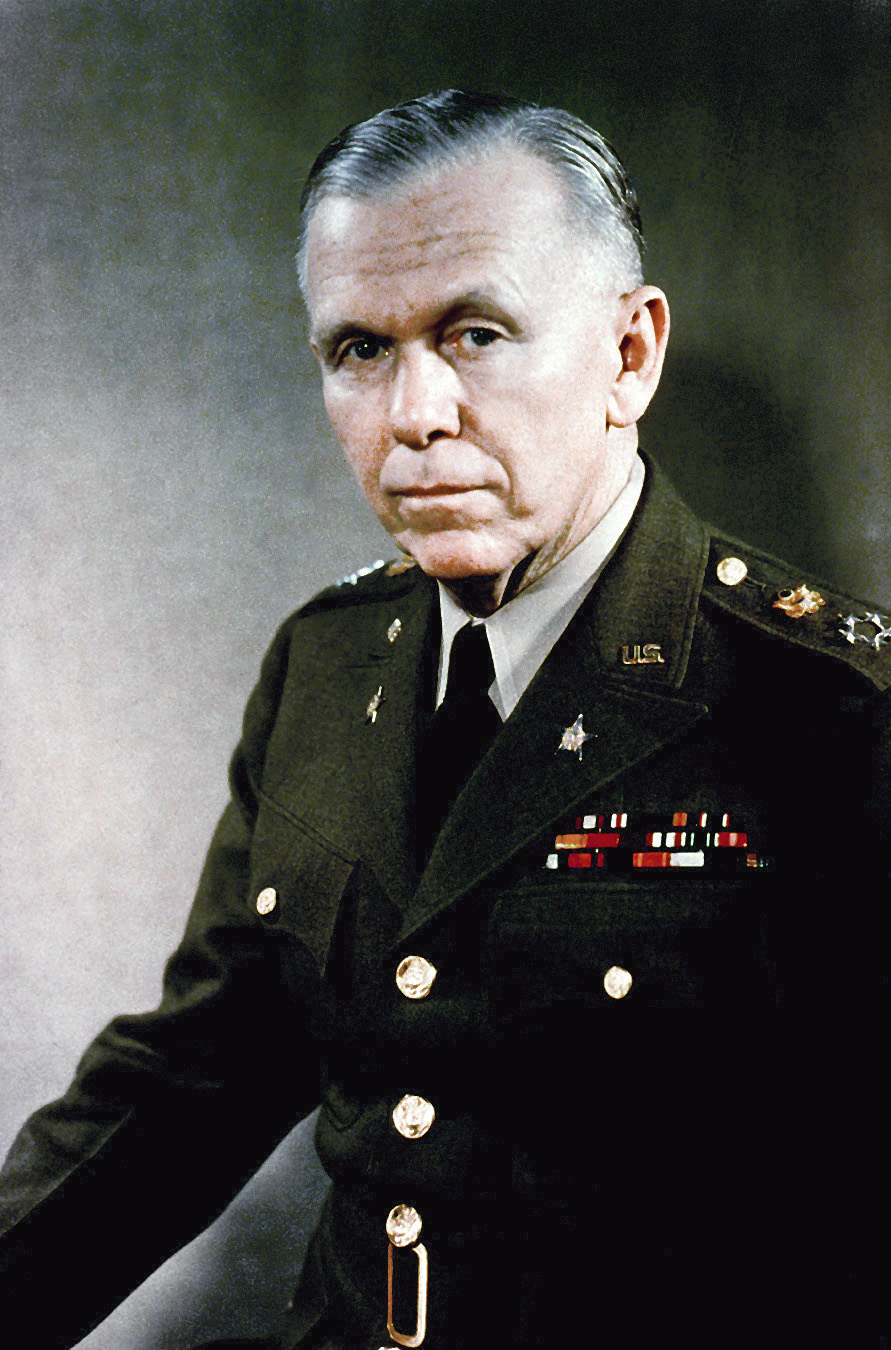
Marshall

- Died: George C. Marshall, 78, World War II general, United States Secretary of State 1947–1949, and 1953 Nobel Peace Prize laureate in recognition of the Marshall Plan for aid to Western Europe during the Cold War

== October 17, 1959 (Saturday) ==
- Belgian authorities in colonial Rwanda removed three Tutsi chiefs, Kayihura, Rwangombwa, and Mungalurire, for inciting their tribesmen to violence against the Hutu tribe.
- After 26 years and 9,477 performances at the Theatre Mart in Los Angeles, the William H. Smith temperance play The Drunkard closed.
- Born:
  - Francisco Flores Pérez, President of El Salvador 1999–2004; in Santa Ana (d. 2016)
  - Norm MacDonald, Canadian actor and comedian; in Quebec City (d. 2021)
  - Richard Roeper, American film critic for the Chicago Sun-Times and successor to the late Gene Siskel as co-host (with Roger Ebert), of At the Movies; in Chicago
  - Ron Drummond, American music historian; in Seattle

== October 18, 1959 (Sunday) ==
- The X-3C, a circular wing hovercraft designed at Princeton University, made its first flight. 20 feet (6.1 m) in diameter and constructed of aluminum, the X-3C has been described as the closest approximation to a flying saucer.
- Former President Harry S. Truman appeared in a series of comic sketches on The Jack Benny Program. Critics disagreed on whether the dignity of the American presidency had been compromised.
- Died: Boughera El Ouafi, 61, Algerian runner and 1928 Olympic marathon winner, was shot to death while dining in a cafe.

== October 19, 1959 (Monday) ==
- The Miracle Worker, starring Anne Bancroft as Annie Sullivan and Patty Duke as Helen Keller, opened on Broadway at the (now closed) Playhouse Theatre. The production won a Tony Award for the best play, best dramatic actress (for Bancroft), and best director (Arthur Penn).
- Died: Josef Hoop, 63, Prime Minister of Liechtenstein from 1928 to 1945, died of heart failure following surgery.

== October 20, 1959 (Tuesday) ==
- The University of Oxford revised its rules to elevate its five affiliated women's colleges (Lady Margaret Hall or LMH, Somerville, St Anne's, St Hugh's and St Hilda's) to equal status with its men's colleges.
- Died: Werner Krauss, 75, German film actor

== October 21, 1959 (Wednesday) ==
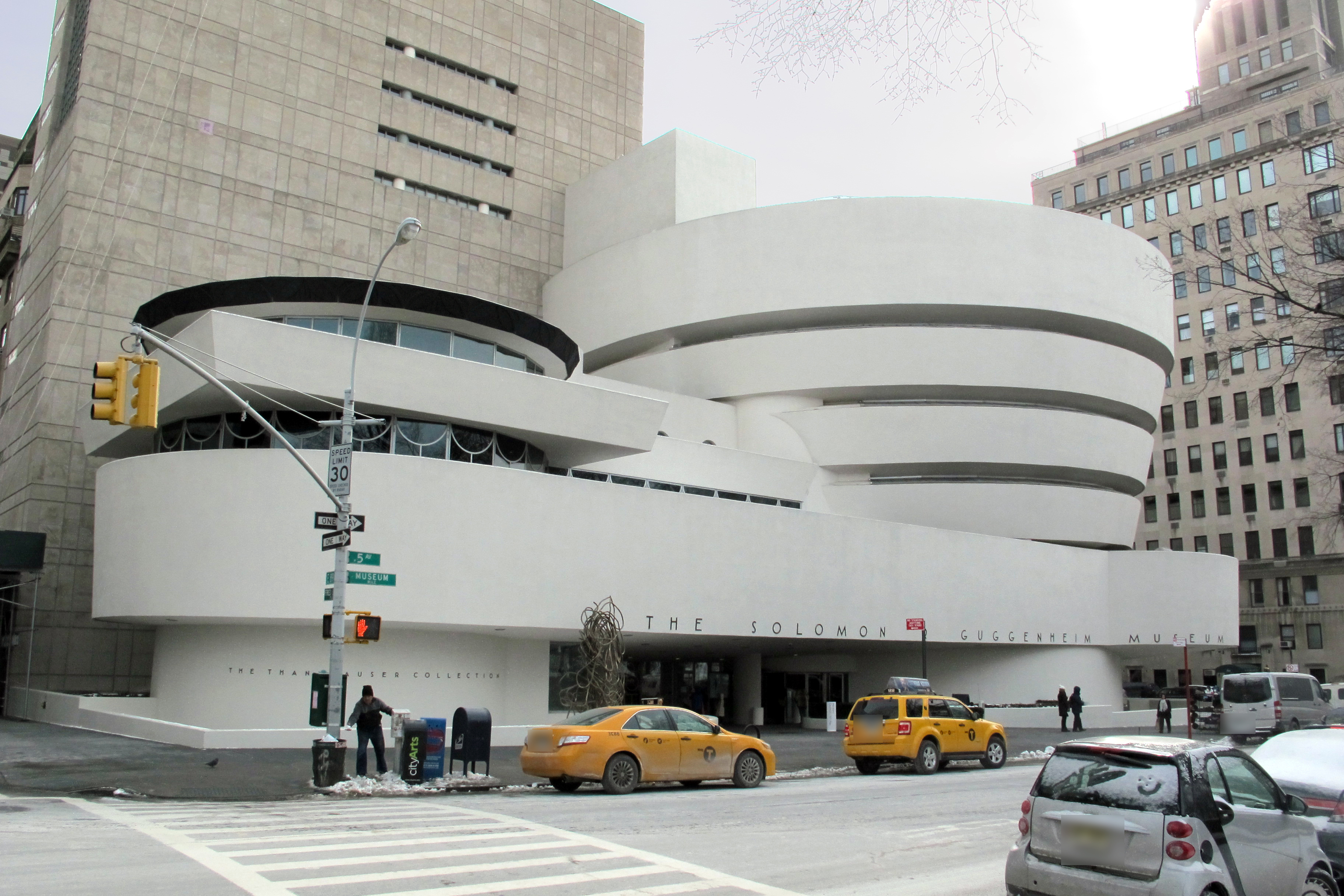
The Guggenheim

- The Solomon R. Guggenheim Museum, popularly referred to as "the Guggenheim", opened in New York. The art museum, designed by Frank Lloyd Wright, is built in the form of a spiral.
- After being told to leave the U.S.S.R., Lee Harvey Oswald slashed his wrists at his Moscow hotel room. His life was saved after Rima Shirokova found Oswald unconscious and had him taken to the Botkinskaya Hospital.
- Major Pedro Díaz Lanz, who had been chief of the Cuban Air Force until defecting in July, flew an airplane from Florida and dropped thousands of leaflets over Havana, then returned to the U.S. In the chaos that followed, two people died and 45 were injured, and Fidel Castro charged that the United States had bombed Cuba.
- Wernher von Braun's team of rocket scientists was transferred from the Army Ballistic Missile Agency to NASA.
- Ten members of India's Central Reserve Police Force (CRPF) were killed at the Kongka Pass near Ladakh at Hot Springs, while defending against an incursion by soldiers from the neighboring People's Republic of China. The other members of the 21-man patrol were taken prisoner, though later released. October 21 is now observed as Police Commemoration Day throughout India.
- Born:
  - Ken Watanabe, Japanese film actor known for The Last Samurai; in Koide
  - Tony Ganios, American film actor known for Porky's; in Brooklyn

== October 22, 1959 (Thursday) ==
- Rioting broke out in San'ya, the ghetto area of Tokyo, as a crowd of about 300 attacked the local police station.
- The Franco-German Extradition Treaty, adopted in 1951, went into effect.
- VES (vesicular exanthema of swine), which had caused a 15-month-long epizootic in 1952 and 1953, was declared to be eradicated.
- Died: Joseph Cahill, 68, Premier of New South Wales since 1952, died of a heart attack.

== October 23, 1959 (Friday) ==
- India and Pakistan signed an agreement that provided that any border disputes would be submitted to "an impartial tribunal consisting of three members".
- The Mummy, starring Peter Cushing and featuring Christopher Lee in the title role, was released in American theaters and would become the most popular horror film up to that time.
- Born: "Weird Al" Yankovic, American singer and parodist; in Downey, California
- Died: William Golden, 48, American graphic designer who created the CBS "eye" logo first used in 1951, died of a heart attack.

== October 24, 1959 (Saturday) ==
- Cuba instituted Law 851, nationalizing more than 150 American investments, including the hotels, casinos and racetrack. Foreign tourism, which had been nearly 275,000 in 1957, fell to 87,000 by 1960.
- Playboy's Penthouse began a brief run on syndicated television. Broadcast live from Chicago, the program was in the format of a cocktail party hosted by Hugh Hefner. Besides increasing sales of the magazine, the program paved the way to the creation of the Playboy Clubs.

== October 25, 1959 (Sunday) ==
- A propeller driven plane served as Air Force One for the last time. President Eisenhower flew from Augusta, Georgia, back to Washington on the "Columbine", a VC-121E Super Constellation.
- The shrine "Our Lady of the Highways" was dedicated on Route 66 in Litchfield, Illinois, for travelers who wished to seek the assistance of the Virgin Mary on their journeys.
- Born: Christina Amphlett, Australian singer for the Divinyls; in Geelong, Victoria (died 2013 from breast cancer)

== October 26, 1959 (Monday) ==
- Earth's residents were able to see the far side of the Moon for the first time, as photographs from the Lunik 3 satellite were released by the Soviet Union.
- The Plymouth Valiant was unveiled by Chrysler, not in Detroit but at the International Motor Show in London.
- Born: Evo Morales, President of Bolivia 2006 to 2019, and the first Bolivian president who was of an indigenous ethnic group, the Aymara people; in Orinoca

== October 27, 1959 (Tuesday) ==
- More than 1,000 people in Mexico were killed by a hurricane that struck the states of Colima and Jalisco. The town of Minatitlán was heaviest hit, with winds, floods and landslides.
- Pakistan's President Muhammad Ayub Khan instituted the program he called "Basic Democracy", whereby the nation would be divided into 80,000 constituencies, each of which would elect its own representative. These 80,000 persons would elect members of parliament and provincial legislatures, as well as the President, and would carry out governmental programs.
- Born: Rick Carlisle, American NBA player, later coach of the NBA 2010-11 champion Dallas Mavericks; in Ogdensburg, New York

== October 28, 1959 (Wednesday) ==
- The synthetic fabric spandex (trademarked as Lycra) was introduced by DuPont, relying upon a "Fiber K", a synthetic elastomer that was lighter and more durable than conventional elastic, making it ideal for swimsuits.
- U.S. Senator John F. Kennedy of Massachusetts began planning for a presidential run with a meeting at Bobby Kennedy's home in Hyannisport.

== October 29, 1959 (Thursday) ==
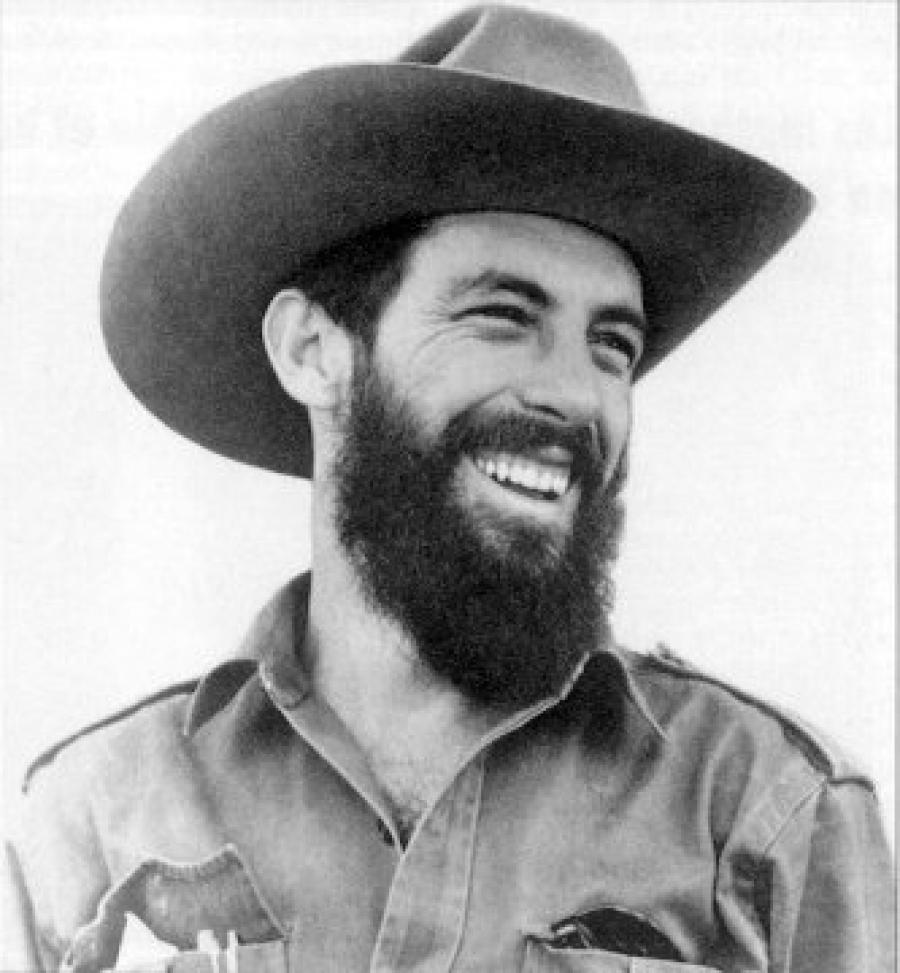
Cienfuegos

- Camilo Cienfuegos, the 26-year-old Commander of Cuba's revolutionary army, took off in a Cessna 310 from Camagüey, bound for Havana, along with three other people. The airplane vanished without a trace, although a bulletin on November 4 from Cuba announced that Cienfuegos had been found on "an island off southern Cuba". Cienfuegos was later celebrated as a Cuban martyr.
- The character of Astérix the Gaul made his debut, appearing in the first regular issue of the comic magazine Pilote.
- The Arkansas State Press, an African-American weekly newspaper founded in 1941 by Lucious Bates, published its last issue. During its 14 years, the newspaper had lobbied to end racial discrimination in Arkansas.
- Died: Sisavang Vong, 74, King of Laos, since independence and King of Luang Prabang during the French colonial period since 1904, died in Luang Phrabang. He was succeeded by Crown Prince Savang Vatthana, who would be the last monarch.

== October 30, 1959 (Friday) ==
- In Stanleyville (now Kisangani), thirty African protesters were killed when colonial soldiers in the Belgian Congo dispersed a protest march made by Patrice Lumumba's Congolese National Movement, and Lumumba was arrested.
- The Alabama Polytechnic Institute was formally renamed as Auburn University.

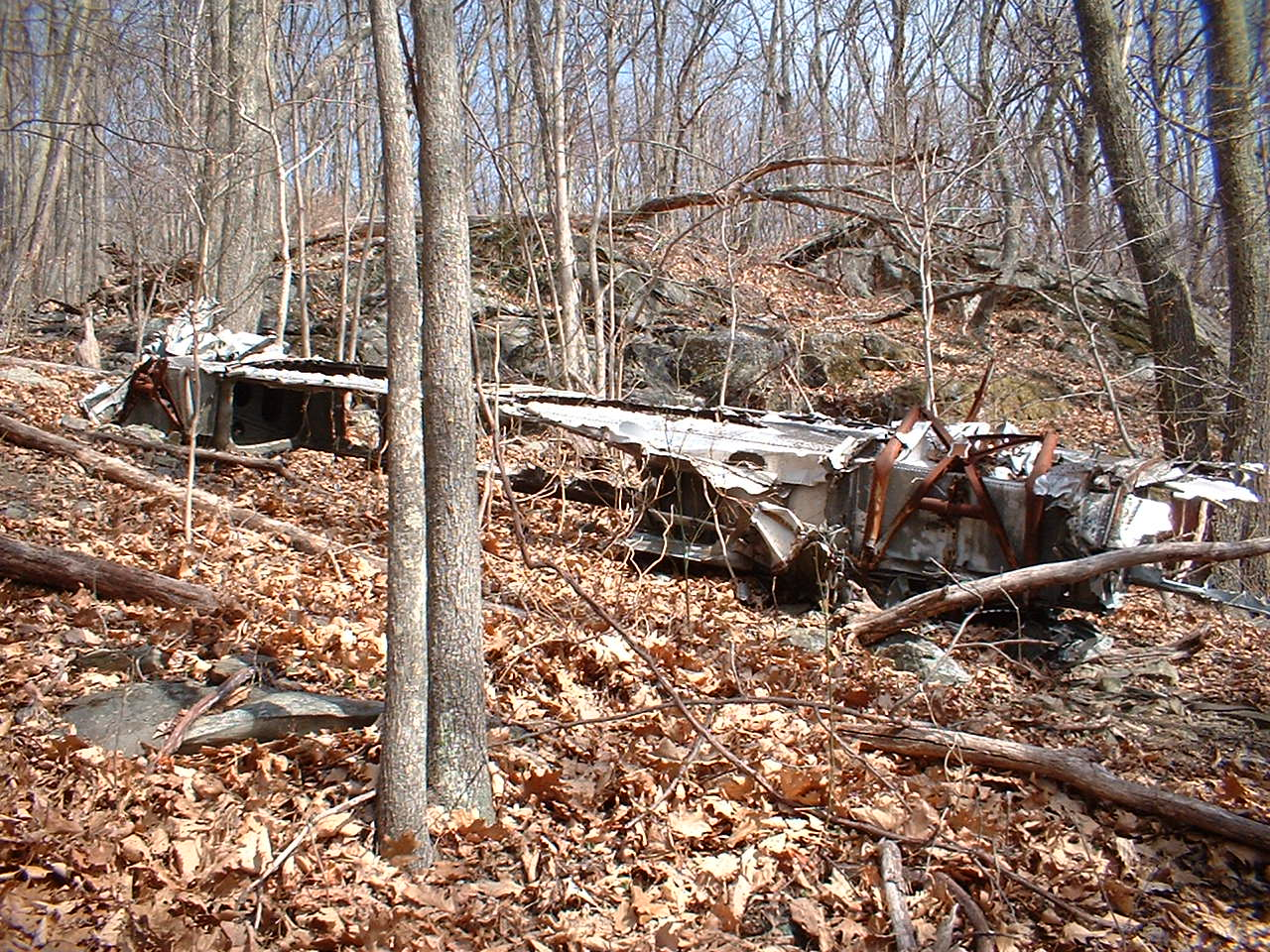
Flight 349 wreckage in 2002

- Piedmont Airlines Flight 349, en route from Washington, D.C., crashed into a mountain near Crozet, Virginia, near the plane's destination of Charlottesville, killing 23 of the 24 people on board. The sole survivor, Phil Bradley, was located after 36 hours, and would participate in the dedication of a memorial on the 50th anniversary of the disaster.
- Died: War Admiral, 25, American thoroughbred horse who won the Triple Crown of U.S. horse racing in 1937

== October 31, 1959 (Saturday) ==
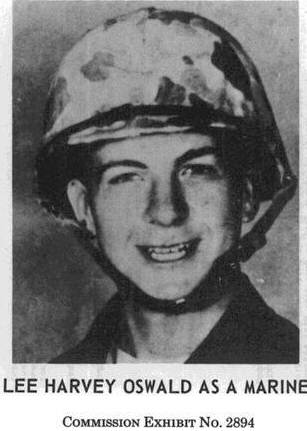
Lee Oswald USMC

- Lee Harvey Oswald entered the U.S. Embassy in Moscow and told officer Richard Edward Snyder that he wished to renounce his American citizenship. Snyder accepted Oswald's passport and a written note but told Oswald that further paperwork would need to be completed. Oswald did not complete the process and returned to the United States in 1962. News of the defection made the front pages of American newspapers four years before he would resurface as the accused assassin of John F. Kennedy.
- Television was seen in Africa for the first time, as the Western Nigeria Television Service started commercial broadcasting on WNTV in Ibadan.
- The 576th Flight Test Squadron armed an Atlas D missile at Vandenberg Air Force Base, creating the first American ICBM to carry a nuclear warhead. The missile was then placed on alert.
- Born: Neal Stephenson, American sci-fi author known for The Diamond Age; in Fort Meade, Maryland
