= American Experience season 25 =

American Experience
- Season 25
- No. of episodes: 8

Release
- Original network: PBS
- Original release: January 8 – November 12, 2013

Season chronology
- ← Previous; Season 24 Next → Season 26

Season twenty-five of the television program American Experience originally aired on the PBS network in the United States on January 8, 2013 and concluded on November 12, 2013. The show celebrated its 25th anniversary. The season contained eight new episodes and began with the first part of The Abolitionists film, "From Courage to Freedom".

== Episodes ==
No. overall	No. in season	Title	Directed by	Categories	Original release date
285	1	"The Abolitionists (Part 1)"	Rob Rapley	Biographies, Civil Rights	January 8, 2013
Part 1: "From Courage to Freedom"
286	2	"The Abolitionists (Part 2)"	Rob Rapley	Biographies, Civil Rights	January 15, 2013
Part 2: "Before Brother Fought Brother"
287	3	"The Abolitionists (Part 3)"	Rob Rapley	Biographies, Civil Rights	January 22, 2013
Part 3: "A House Dividing"
288	4	"Henry Ford"	Sarah Colt	Biographies, Popular Culture	January 29, 2013
289	5	"Silicon Valley"	Randall MacLowry	Biographies, Popular Culture, Technology	February 5, 2013
290	6	"War of the Worlds"	Cathleen O'Connell	Popular Culture	October 29, 2013
Recounts and examines the impact of the Columbia Broadcasting System (CBS) airing of the radio episode, "The War of the Worlds" on October 30, 1938 and its presenter Orson Welles. The radio episode was based on the science fiction novel of the same name by English author H. G. Wells. The radio series, The Mercury Theatre on the Air, broadcast a mock news report that claimed there was an alien invasion by Martians. The broadcast produced numerous news reports of listeners responding with panic and mass hysteria.
291	7	"JFK (Part 1)"	Susan Bellows	Biographies, Politics, Presidents	November 11, 2013
Chronicles the life, presidency, and murder of John Fitzgerald Kennedy, the 35th president of the United States and the eighth president to die while in office. The film aired to coincide with the 50th anniversary of JFK's assassination that occurred on November 22, 1963.
292	8	"JFK (Part 2)"	Susan Bellows	Biographies, Politics, Presidents	November 12, 2013
Part two of the John Fitzgerald Kennedy biopic. The film aired to coincide with the 50th anniversary of JFK's assassination that occurred on November 22, 1963.
