= Jesse Owens (American Experience) =

- American Experience episode
- Episode no.: Season 24; Episode 7
- Directed by: Laurens Grant
- Written by: Stanley Nelson Jr.
- Original release date: May 1, 2012
- Running time: 52 minutes

Guest appearance
- Andre Braugher (narrator)

Episode chronology
← Previous "Grand Coulee Dam"	Next → "Death and the Civil War"
- American Experience (season 24)

Jesse Owens is a 2012 American documentary television film produced and distributed by PBS. It serves as the seventh episode of season 24 of American Experience.

== Summary ==
It centers on American track and field athlete Jesse Owens and his participation in the 1936 Summer Olympics.

== Production and release ==
PBS produced the film for American Experience. The film serves as a profile of Owens and includes experts weighing in on his accomplishments.

Laurens Grant directed the film. Stanley Nelson, who frequently collaborates with PBS wrote the film. Andre Braugher narrates the film.

PBS both broadcast the film and released it on DVD on May 1, 2012.

== Reception ==
Mike Hale of The New York Times wrote positively of the film, though noted that it "suffers from its brevity," adding "There's not much time to get below the surface, and Owens's troubled post-Olympic life gets particularly quick treatment." Hale added that what Grant does put on screen "is unimpeachable."

=== Accolades ===
Grant, Nelson and Andrew Horn won a News & Documentary Emmy Award for their research on this documentary.
