= American Experience season 26 =

American Experience
- Season 26
- No. of episodes: 7

Release
- Original network: PBS
- Original release: January 7 – November 18, 2014

Season chronology
- ← Previous; Season 25 Next → Season 27

Season 26 of the television program American Experience was originally shown on the PBS network in the United States from January 7, 2014, and concluded on November 18, 2014. The season contained seven new episodes and began with the film The Poisoner's Handbook.

== Episodes ==
No. overall	No. in season	Title	Directed by	Written by	Original release date
293	1	"The Poisoner's Handbook"	Rob Rapley	Teleplay by : Rob Rapley; Story by : Michelle Ferrari	January 7, 2014
Chronicles the pioneering work of medical examiner Charles Norris and toxicologist Alexander Gettler in New York City during Prohibition and the Great Depression. By recounting their combined work of applying the scientific method to crimes and poisons, the documentary reveals their contribution to the emerging field of forensic toxicology. The film is in part based on the book, The Poisoner's Handbook: Murder and the Birth of Forensic Medicine in Jazz Age New York, by Deborah Blum.
294	2	"1964"	Stephen Ives	Stephen Ives	January 14, 2014
Recounts and examines pivotal events and personalities in politics, culture and sports during 1964 and their reverberations into the present time in the United States. The film is in part based on the book, The Last Innocent Year: America in 1964, by Jon Margolis.
295	3	"The Amish: Shunned"	Callie T. Wiser	Callie T. Wiser	February 4, 2014
Examines the experience of several exiled individuals who are former members of an Amish community and their response to the Amish practice of shunning.
296	4	"Butch Cassidy and the Sundance Kid"	John Maggio	John Maggio	February 11, 2014
Documents the life and crimes of Butch Cassidy and the Sundance Kid, members of Butch Cassidy's Wild Bunch.
297	5	"The Rise and Fall of Penn Station"	Randall MacLowry	Randall MacLowry	February 18, 2014
Examines the construction, demise, and eventual demolition of Pennsylvania Station in New York City and its legacy for preservation efforts in the United States. The film is in part based on the book, Conquering Gotham: Building Penn Station and Its Tunnels, by Jill Jonnes.
298	6	"Freedom Summer"	Stanley Nelson	Stanley Nelson	June 24, 2014
Chronicles the Mississippi Summer Project during the Civil Rights Movement in 1964.
299	7	"Cold War Roadshow"	Robert Stone & Tim B. Toidze	Unknown	November 18, 2014
A documentary about a 12-day tour in the United States during September 1959 by Nikita Khrushchev, Premier of the Soviet Union by invitation of Dwight D. Eisenhower, President of the United States, during the Cold War. The documentary focuses on the reaction of the American media and the nations' citizens.
