= American Experience season 27 =

American Experience
- Season 27
- No. of episodes: 11

Release
- Original network: PBS
- Original release: January 6 – November 24, 2015

Season chronology
- ← Previous; Season 26 Next → Season 28

Season twenty-seven of the television program American Experience originally aired on the PBS network in the United States on January 6, 2015 and concluded on November 24, 2015. The season contained 11 new episodes and began with the film Ripley: Believe It or Not.

== Episodes ==
No. overall	No. in season	Title	Directed by	Written by	Original release date
300	1	"Ripley: Believe It or Not"	Cathleen O'Connell	Cathleen O'Connell	January 6, 2015
A documentary about the origin of the franchise Ripley's Believe It or Not! and its founder Robert Ripley.
301	2	"Klansville U.S.A."	Callie T. Wiser	Teleplay by : David Espar & Callie T. Wiser; Story by : Callie T. Wiser	January 13, 2015
Chronicles the reemergence of the Ku Klux Klan under the leadership of Bob Jones in North Carolina during the 1960s. The film is in part based on the book, Klansville, U.S.A., by David Cunningham.
302	3	"Edison"	Michelle Ferrari	Michelle Ferrari	January 27, 2015
Chronicles the life and inventions of Thomas Edison.
303	4	"The Big Burn"	Stephen Ives	Stephen Ives	February 3, 2015
Examines the Great Fire of 1910, the largest forest fire in United States history. The fire burned parts of the U.S. states of Washington, Idaho, and Montana over the course of two days. The film is in part based on the book, The Big Burn: Teddy Roosevelt and the Fire that Saved America, by Timothy Egan.
304	5	"The Forgotten Plague"	Chana Gazit	Chana Gazit	February 10, 2015
Examines the impact of the infectious disease tuberculosis in the United States immediately prior to the discovery of an effective treatment and during the search for a cure. The film is in part based on the book, Living In The Shadow Of Death, by Sheila Rothman.
305	6	"Last Days in Vietnam"	Rory Kennedy	Mark Bailey & Keven McAlester	April 28, 2015
Chronicles the chaotic evacuation of United States military personnel, American diplomats, and panicked South Vietnamese that occurred during the Fall of Saigon in South Vietnam during the Vietnam War in April 1975. Awards and nominations: Academy Award nomination for "Best Documentary Feature" at the 87th Academy Awards and International Documentary Association (IDF) award for "Best Editing" for the "Creative Recognition Award" in 2014.
306	7	"Blackout"	Callie T. Wiser	Teleplay by : Sharon Grimberg; Story by : David Murdock	July 14, 2015
A documentary about the New York City blackout of 1977.
307	8	"Walt Disney (Part 1)"	Sarah Colt	Teleplay by : Mark Zwonitzer; Story by : Sarah Colt & Tom Jennings	September 14, 2015
Part one of the documentary about the origin of The Walt Disney Company and its co-founder Walt Disney.
308	9	"Walt Disney (Part 2)"	Sarah Colt	Teleplay by : Mark Zwonitzer; Story by : Sarah Colt & Tom Jennings	September 15, 2015
Part two of the documentary about the origin of The Walt Disney Company and its co-founder Walt Disney.
309	10	"American Comandante"	Adriana Bosch	Adriana Bosch	November 17, 2015
A documentary about the life of William Alexander Morgan, an American citizen that fought in the Cuban Revolution and served as a commandante alongside Fidel Castro.
310	11	"The Pilgrims"	Ric Burns	Ric Burns	November 24, 2015
A documentary about William Bradford and the Pilgrims, a small group of religious separatists that established one of the earliest English colonies in North America - Plymouth Colony.
