= American Experience season 24 =

American Experience
- Season 24
- No. of episodes: 8

Release
- Original network: PBS
- Original release: January 10 – September 18, 2012

Season chronology
- ← Previous; Season 23 Next → Season 25

Season twenty-four of the television program American Experience originally aired on the PBS network in the United States on January 10, 2012 and concluded on September 18, 2012. The season contained eight new episodes and began with the film Billy the Kid.

== Episodes ==
| No. overall | No. in season | Title | Directed by | Categories | Original release date |
|---|---|---|---|---|---|
| 277 | 1 | "Billy the Kid" | John Maggio | Biographies, The American West | January 10, 2012 |
| 278 | 2 | "Custer's Last Stand" | Stephen Ives | Biographies, Native American History, The American West | January 17, 2012 |
| 279 | 3 | "Clinton (Part 1)" | Barak Goodman | Biographies, Politics, Presidents | February 20, 2012 |
Part 1: "The Comeback Kid"
| 280 | 4 | "Clinton (Part 2)" | Barak Goodman | Biographies, Politics, Presidents | February 21, 2012 |
Part 2: "The Survivor"
| 281 | 5 | "The Amish" | David Belton | Biographies, Popular Culture | February 28, 2012 |
| 282 | 6 | "Grand Coulee Dam" | Stephen Ives | Native American History, Technology, The; American West, The Natural Environment | April 3, 2012 |
| 283 | 7 | "Jesse Owens" | Laruens Grant | Biographies, Civil Rights, Popular Culture, War | May 1, 2012 |
| 284 | 8 | "Death and the Civil War" | Ric Burns | Popular Culture, War | September 18, 2012 |
