= Koide =

Koide Naamai
- Village
- Interactive map of Koide
- Coordinates: 25°23′07″N 94°11′02″E
- Country: India
- State: Manipur
- District: Senapati

Languages
  - Official: Poula
- Time zone: UTC+5:30 (IST)
- PIN: 795015
- Vehicle registration: MN

Koide village is located in Senapati district, Manipur, India. The Koide people belonging to Lepaona group settled down at Koide under the chieftainship of Napou-Rakhuo. Poumai Naga is a major Naga tribe with a population of 1,79,189 as per 2011 census. There are 84 Poumai revenue recognised villages and Koide villages (Upper Koide and Lower Koide) come under this. Poumai villages are divided into four divisions for administrative purposes as - Chileve circle, Lepaona circle, Paomata Circle and there are also villages located in the periphery of NH39.

The Etymology of Naamai

The name of the village "Naamai" is given by our forefathers and is translated as "Rear-Men". It was named so because they were the people who marched at the rear of the file during their divergence from Makhel. Some school of thought misinterpreted the nomenclature Naamai as the youngest one in the kinsfolk. But the true meaning behind its nomenclature is "Defender or Protector" of their kinsmen, the one who is always behind the weak or the young to encourage to keep up or proceed forward with their march so that defend and protect from the risk of any warring group impeding their adventure or making after them. It is also supported with the events during their dispersal from makhel, that Lapao Suru was way laid by Khyapou Dukhu. Thereby the Naamai Pao led away Lapao Suru overcoming the blockade and reached Naafii. It is also a known fact that by tradition the elderly or the Chivalrous defends the weak or the young one in any undertakings. The existing proof behind the meaning of the nomenclature is supplemented by the Khongdei people, a descendant of Pao Leo, who still called the Naamai as "Nakadai" means a vast shelter place, a place for defending the intruders. Therefore, the naming after the village "Naamai" called in our native dialect is very appropriate in every sense according to the chronological sources.

== History ==
Having no written documents to supplements of the past, to trace the origin and history of the Nagas, folk songs, and folk tales forms the archaic which passes through from generation to generation by oral tradition. Obviously says that Pao Leo the ancestor of "Naamai" a Mongolian race was a son of the soil, Makhel. Pao Leo had four sons known as "Lepao Pao dai" whose descendants are the people now called as Lepaona (Children of Pao Leo). The descendants of Makhel follows patriarchal system who also practice patrilocal and patrilineal system. Thereby the inheritance of the father's property by Rokhu-o clearly denotes that Rokhu-o was the eldest son among Pao Leo's children. For which the present Naamai village is the inherited place of Rokhu-o the place where the Lepao Paodai first settled and now Naamai is the people who are heir of the ancestral land called Naamai village.

== Migration from Makhel – the Naga dispersal site ==
The Poumai Naga took the wave of migration from Makhel in two directions-Northeast and South East direction. The descendant of Liio (Lepaona) took the southeast direction and settled at Koide village under the leadership of Chief Rokhuo. The descendants of Pao (Paomata) took the northeast direction and settled at Saranamai village after the four Chiefs were chosen to head the new settlement. The descendants of Prou (Chiliive) also went in the northeast direction and settled at Prouphii. However, some believed that all the Poumai first migrated to Saranamai and then migrated to different circles or areas. The Lepaona, guided by a Tiger and Eagles migrated from Makhel (Naga dispersal site) to Koide village (Lepaona dispersal site). The name LEPAONA is derived from the word PAO-LIIO-NA, which means "grand father Liio’s progenies or descendants". The literary meaning of LEPAONA means "grandchildren of Liio or descendants of Liio".

Koide village has a "Holy Well" known as Shodziikhao on the eastern side of the village. It is said that the water of this well is used for the sanctification of birth rituals, important gennas and marriage ceremonies. The well, which remains perennial throughout the year, exists even today.

With the increase of population today the Koide village is emerged into five villages known as Upper Koide, Lower Koide, Koide Kapao, Koide Biisho and Koide Zho (Zhophao) village. There are six clans (Khel) in Koide village and intra-clan marriage is prohibited in the village. There are four Koide villages but the unity of Koide village is unquestionable due to emerging into different village and locations. From time to time all the five Koide villages Students Organization come together and hold Sports Meet under Koide Youth and Students Organization (KYSO). Even though the Kapao, Biisho and Zho villages are situated some kilometers away from main Koide village, the polling booth is located at Koide main village and they come to cast their vote at Koide whenever there is Manipur Assembly or MP election.

== Population ==
Koide Makha is a large village located in Purul of Senapati district, Manipur with total 730 families residing. The Koide Makha village has population of 3760 of which 1987 are males while 1773 are females as per Population Census 2011. In Koide Makha village population of children with age 0-6 is 381 which makes up 10.13% of total population of village. Average Sex Ratio of Koide Makha village is 892 which is lower than Manipur state average of 985. Child Sex Ratio for the Koide Makha as per census is 797, lower than Manipur average of 930. Koide Makha village has lower literacy rate compared to Manipur. In 2011, literacy rate of Koide Makha village was 49.66% compared to 76.94% of Manipur. In Koide Makha Male literacy stands at 56.85% while female literacy rate was 41.71%. As per Constitution of India and Panchyati Raaj Act, Koide Makha village is administrated by Sarpanch (Head of Village) who is elected representative of village.

Koide Mathak Population - Senapati, Manipur Koide Mathak is a large village located in Purul of Senapati district, Manipur with total 729 families residing. The Koide Mathak village has population of 4513 of which 2441 are males while 2072 are females as per Population Census 2011. In Koide Mathak village population of children with age 0-6 is 353 which makes up 7.82% of total population of village. Average Sex Ratio of Koide Mathak village is 849 which is lower than Manipur state average of 985. Child Sex Ratio for the Koide Mathak as per census is 756, lower than Manipur average of 930. Koide Mathak village has lower literacy rate compared to Manipur. In 2011, literacy rate of Koide Mathak village was 55.94% compared to 76.94% of Manipur. In Koide Mathak Male literacy stands at 60.85% while female literacy rate was 50.21%. As per constitution of India and Panchyati Raaj Act, Koide Mathak village is administrated by Sarpanch (Head of Village) who is elected representative of village.

== Agriculture ==
Some of the main varieties of rice that growth at Koide village are: Phaora,(white in colour) for making pucca rohi(rice beer) Kirou (white in colour, for making rice beer), Ngatei (red in color) Ngadziizii (white color) etc. Kirou (sticky rice, white in colour) is the most costly rice. Much rice beer (Pouzhao) and Poumai Naga bread are made in Kirou. Phaora (sticky rice) is the second most costly type of rice, which is mainly grown at Koide village in the periphery of Barak River valley. Phaora can be used for as rice for food; it also used for brewing rice beer. Laolu (shifting cultivation) is a form of primitive agriculture, which is now rarely practice at Koide village.

Some of the important vegetables found at Koide village are cabbage, potato, pumpkin, squash, tomatoes, Brinjal, cucumber, mustard, bean, Naga Dal, sweet potato, leek, etc. Squash, pumpkin, fruits, etc. are also grown. Some of the important fruits such as bananas, lemons, oranges, pears, apricots, guava, apples, papayas, Khashi, peaches, plums, etc. are grown in the village. Ginger farming recently started. There is huge pastureland and grassland and there is great potentiality of animal husbandry. Thatch houses were famous in olden days and Koide village is well known for good quality of thatch roofing. In olden days, some of the neighboring villages like Oinam and Purul used to come and take thatch (Ngaiche) from Koide village for roofing houses.

Present Village Administrative System

In the present society, the villagers elect the village chairman and his secretary who is the head of the village council, which is the main apex body of administration in the village. The village council is all-in-all affairs of the village. Their main duties are to uplift the social, economic, education, political, cultural and judiciary affairs of the village. The village has women's, youths', students' and religious organizations. However, they are all under the control of the village council, though each organization functions independently of outside influence and function smoothly without affecting the village council administration.

Social structure of the people

The Naga lived mostly in the villages so, as the Naamai too lived in the hill-tops. The villages were built just above the spot where the spur of the hill-tops which provide a commanding view over the surrounding areas. The ancestors choose to live in the hilltops were to keep constant vigil on the invading of the enemies.

Naamai's was a compact and well-knit society where rigid customs and discipline were observed. As the village was an independent unit, the customary laws were supreme and dispensation of punishment was quick.

According to the customary laws and of the traditional customs the village had bonded certain rules and regulation for the well fares of the villagers that there shall not discriminate of any caste, class, sex and place of birth. Whosoever, used filthy words and tainted others will liable to imposed the village fined. The village is divided into khel, which is interrelated by marriage. Each khel is again divided into sub-clan and lineage.

The villages are in a compact settlement. In the earlier time there were gates constructed in all the village's entry due to ferocious of headhunting. In the olden times all the village gates will close every night to protect the people from the headhunters. Strong young men were appointed as village guards. In order to give alert of the villagers and scare away the headhunters, the guards usually blew buffalo horns. A round-the-clock vigil was maintained at each village gate during the raid of head hunting. The youth did the sentry duty by turn. Any dereliction of such duty met with heavy punishment. The village gates remained a prominent cultural landmark till headhunters ceased altogether in the villages, but one can still stumble upon dilapidated village gates. After they embraced of Christianity village gates were no longer maintained since there is no longer fear from the enemy. However, peoples started constructed village gates in order to promote the significant and important of it cultural and customs of the Nagas.

== Tourists attractions ==
The Naamai Vaotao (Koide Peak) is the highest point and it is sloping down to Barak valley. The Koide village is on the periphery of (Vourei and Vurei) Barak River and some of the important potential tourist places are like Zhophao, Biisho, Ngaizhephao, Haphozhe, Halephao, Lahshozhe, Leacheche (hilltop cliff), etc. During spring season Naamai Hill's and valley's bloom of jungle trees flowers and Dziiriipah/kaotupah along with sounds of cuckoo and another bird name Reipeiho. In summer, Zhophao, Biisho, Ngaizhiphao, Lahsozhe, Halephao, etc. are fully green with small grasses but in winter the grasses dry up. From time to time people from Kohima, Mao Imphal and Senapati H.Q come for picnic at Biisho and Zhophao valley. The maximum temperature is 34.0 °C (93.2 °F) and the minimum temperature is 3.0 °C (37.4 °F), which was recorded in 2000 at Kangpokpi. Kangpokpi is about 55 km (34 mi) from Koide village. The annual rainfall on an average is around 1400 mm.
