= September 1959 =

Month of 1959

<<	September 1959					>>
Su	Mo	Tu	We	Th	Fr	Sa
		1	2	3	4	5
6	7	8	9	10	11	12
13	14	15	16	17	18	19
20	21	22	23	24	25	26
27	28	29	30

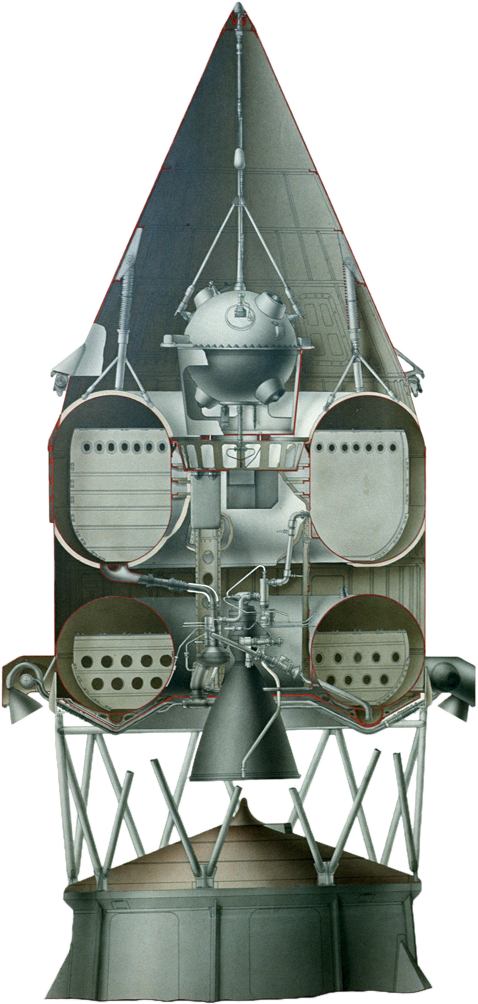
September 14, 1959: Soviet-launched Lunik 2 becomes first man-made object to land on Moon

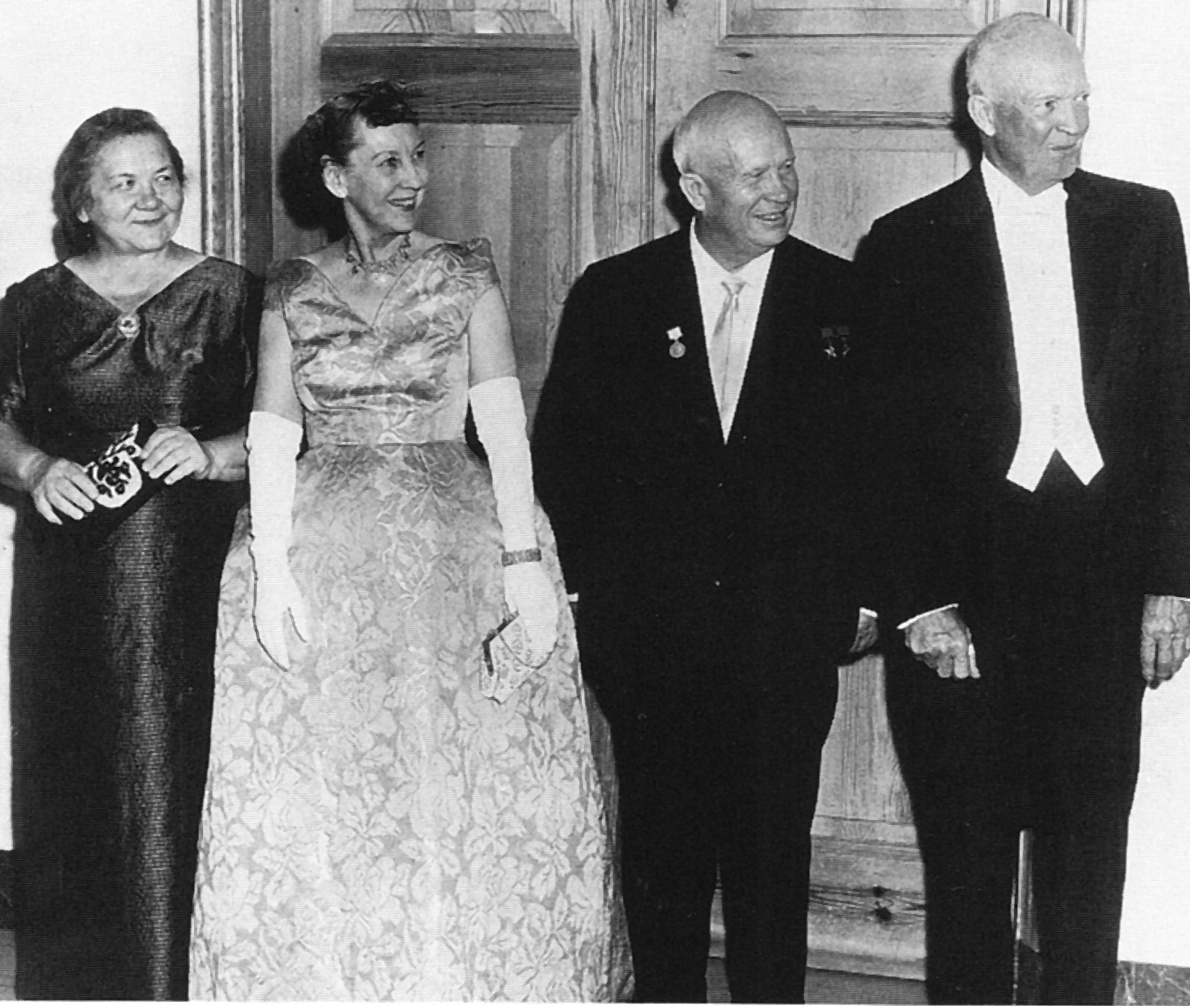
September 27, 1959: Soviet Premier Khrushchev at White House to complete 11-day U.S. visit as guest of U.S. President Eisenhower

September 18, 1959: The "jetway", first jet bridge, opens at Atlanta airport

The following events occurred in September 1959:

== September 1, 1959 (Tuesday) ==
- In India, seven people were killed, and 30 others injured, when police fired into a crowd of rioters gathered at the University of Calcutta during the second day of violence arising from food shortages. India's Defense Minister V. K. Krishna Menon and the chiefs of India's Army, Navy and Air Force all resigned over handling of the riots. After the Indian Army restored order, 27 rioters were dead.
- McDonnell Aircraft Corporation issued its report on using a modified Mercury capsule to explore spaceflight possibilities beyond Project Mercury, with experiments for touchdown control, maneuver in orbit, self-contained guidance, 14-day mission, crewed reconnaissance, and lunar-orbit reentry. All six experiments could be conducted with practical modifications of Mercury capsules. Over the next seven days, McDonnell moved a segment of its Mercury effort to Cape Canaveral to prepare for the next phase of the program, assigning personnel to Hangar 5 for the development of plans for the Mercury-Redstone and Mercury-Atlas missions.
- Liquor could legally be sold in the U.S. state of Oklahoma for the first time since its admission (in 1907) as the 46th state.
- Born: Kenny Mayne, American sportscaster on ESPN; in Kent, Washington

== September 2, 1959 (Wednesday) ==
- The U.S. House of Representatives voted 274–138 in favor of overriding President Dwight D. Eisenhower's veto of a $1.2 billion appropriation bill but fell one vote short.
- At a conference in Edmonton, Dr. Linus Pauling said that 290,000 people then living would eventually die of cancer due to fallout from atomic blasts since 1945, and that another 30,000 to 60,000 would die for every nuclear bomb exploded in the future.
- Born: Guy Laliberté, Canadian founder of Cirque du Soleil; in Quebec City

== September 3, 1959 (Thursday) ==
Singapore flag

- Singapore's new flag was raised, replacing the British flag after 140 years. The flag-raising was performed as the new anthem, Majulah Singapura, composed by Zubir Said, was played. Singapore would become independent on December 22, 1965.
- The merger of South Korea's six Kwans created the Korean Taekwondo Association.

== September 4, 1959 (Friday) ==
- The American National Exhibition at Moscow's Sokolniki Park closed after six weeks, having been open since July 25. Earlier in the summer, the Soviet Exhibition of Science, Technology and Culture had been displayed in New York City. The display of American life has been described as "probably the most productive single psychological effort ever launched by the U.S. in any Communist country."
- Born: Kevin Harrington, Australian TV actor (Neighbours); in Melbourne

== September 5, 1959 (Saturday) ==
- NWS-9, the first television station in the State of South Australia, began broadcasting.
- The Kingdom of Laos proclaimed a state of emergency a day after asking the United Nations to protect it from rebels from North Vietnam. UN Secretary General Dag Hammarskjöld cut short a tour to return to New York to convene a meeting on the crisis.

== September 6, 1959 (Sunday) ==
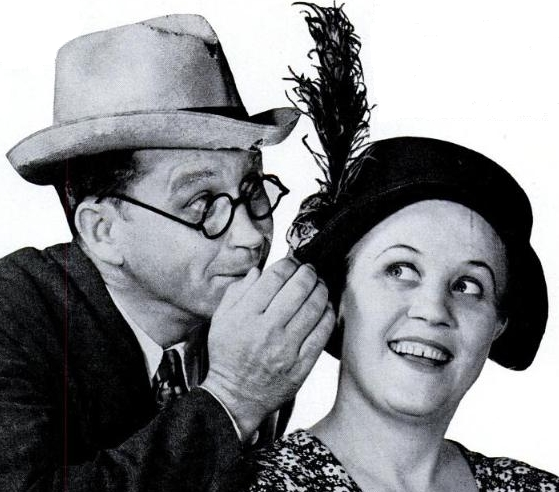
Fibber McGee & Molly

- The radio show Fibber McGee & Molly was broadcast for the last time. Starring Jim and Marian Jordan, the show debuted on April 16, 1935, and was one of the NBC network's top programs during the 1940s, each Tuesday evening at 9:30. An NBC television version, with Bob Sweeney and Cathy Lewis in the title roles, debuted on September 15 and ran for only 12 episodes.
- The first jet airliner landed in Honolulu, a Pan American 707. With the advent of jet travel, a trip to Hawaii was less than five hours from the mainland, turning the islands into a prime tourist destination. The same plane landed in Tokyo at 8 pm, cutting flight time between the United States and Japan from 29 hours to 17 hours.
- Died:
  - Edmund Gwenn, 81, English actor
  - Kay Kendall, 33, British actress, winner of Golden Globe in 1957 for Les Girls and wife of Rex Harrison, died of leukemia
  - Andrew Jackson May, 84, Congressman from Kentucky (1931–1947) who was later imprisoned in 1949 for conspiracy to defraud but pardoned 1952

== September 7, 1959 (Monday) ==
- Eighty-one students from Kenya departed from Nairobi on the first flight of the East African Airlift, en route to New York City and then to colleges in the United States and Canada. The operation, which has been called "The Kennedy Airlift" because of its sponsorship by then-U.S. Senator John F. Kennedy of Massachusetts, would bring hundreds of young East African men and women to North American universities and colleges during 1959 and 1960.
- Died: Maurice Duplessis, who had governed the Province of Quebec as its Premier since 1944, died four days after suffering a stroke while visiting Schefferville. One observer opined later that it was "the event that enabled Quebec to open up to the modern world", adding that "He had been a dictatorial leader, treating members of his cabinet as ciphers, and making all the decisions himself."

== September 8, 1959 (Tuesday) ==
- U.S. President Eisenhower signed a bill to protect American mustangs into law, making it a violation of federal law to use aircraft or motorized vehicles on public land in hunting wild horses and burros. Velma Bronn Johnston of Wadsworth, Nevada, nicknamed "Wild Horse Annie", had lobbied Congress to pass the bill.
- Britain's Prime Minister Harold Macmillan announced that new elections for the 630 seats in the House of Commons would take place on October 8, with Parliament to be dissolved on September 18.
- Born: Daler Nazarov, Tajik composer; in Dushanbe, Tadzhik SSR, U.S.S.R.

== September 9, 1959 (Wednesday) ==
- The final tests of the Atlas-D, the first ICBM, were conducted "in separate launches from opposite sides of the United States". At Cape Canaveral in Florida, Atlas missile number 10-D, known as Big Joe 1, carried an uncrewed Mercury capsule into space. Although booster-engine separation did not occur, the flight proved that the heat shield could protect humans from the heat from reentry. Most of the test objectives were attained. Missile number 12-D was launched successfully from Vandenberg Air Force Base in California.
- The Space Task Group provided McDonnell with guidance in the development of the "Astronauts' Handbook."
- Born: Éric Serra, French composer of film scores, including the music for GoldenEye; in Saint-Mandé, Paris
- Died: Collie Smith (O'Neill Gordon Smith), 26, Jamaican cricket star, in an auto accident

== September 10, 1959 (Thursday) ==
- After 145 vetoes that stood, Congress overrode U.S. President Dwight D. Eisenhower for the first time as both houses got the necessary two-thirds majority. The President had vetoed a $1,185,309,093 public works bill. The vote in the House was 280–121, followed by a 72–23 vote in the Senate.
- At Mountain Lake Park, Maryland, seven children were killed when their school bus stalled on a railroad crossing and was struck by a freight train. The bus, with 26 on board, was on its way to Denett Road Elementary School in Oakland when the accident happened at 8:30 a.m.
- At a Mercury spacecraft mock-up review on September 10 and 11, the astronauts submitted several recommended changes which involved a new instrument panel, a forward centerline window, and an explosive side egress hatch.

== September 11, 1959 (Friday) ==
- After a preliminary study of the Mercury environment with regard to astronaut food and water requirements, Dr. Douglas H. K. Lee of the Natick Quartermasters Research and Engineering Laboratory estimated that water use would be in the order of 500 cubic centimetres (31 cu in)/hr and that the caloric intake per day would be about 3,200 calories of food.
- One day after a similar accident in Maryland, a train killed children on their way to school. Mrs. Irene Zimmerman and her six children were struck while on their way to Sacred Heart Parochial School in Waseca, Minnesota.
- Relief pitcher Elroy Face of the Pittsburgh Pirates recorded his only loss in an 18–1 season, losing 5–4 to the Los Angeles Dodgers.

== September 12, 1959 (Saturday) ==
- Bonanza appeared for the first time on American television, premiering at 7:30 p.m. Eastern time on NBC. The Western, first to be broadcast in color, ran for 14 seasons and 440 episodes until January 16, 1973.

== September 13, 1959 (Sunday) ==
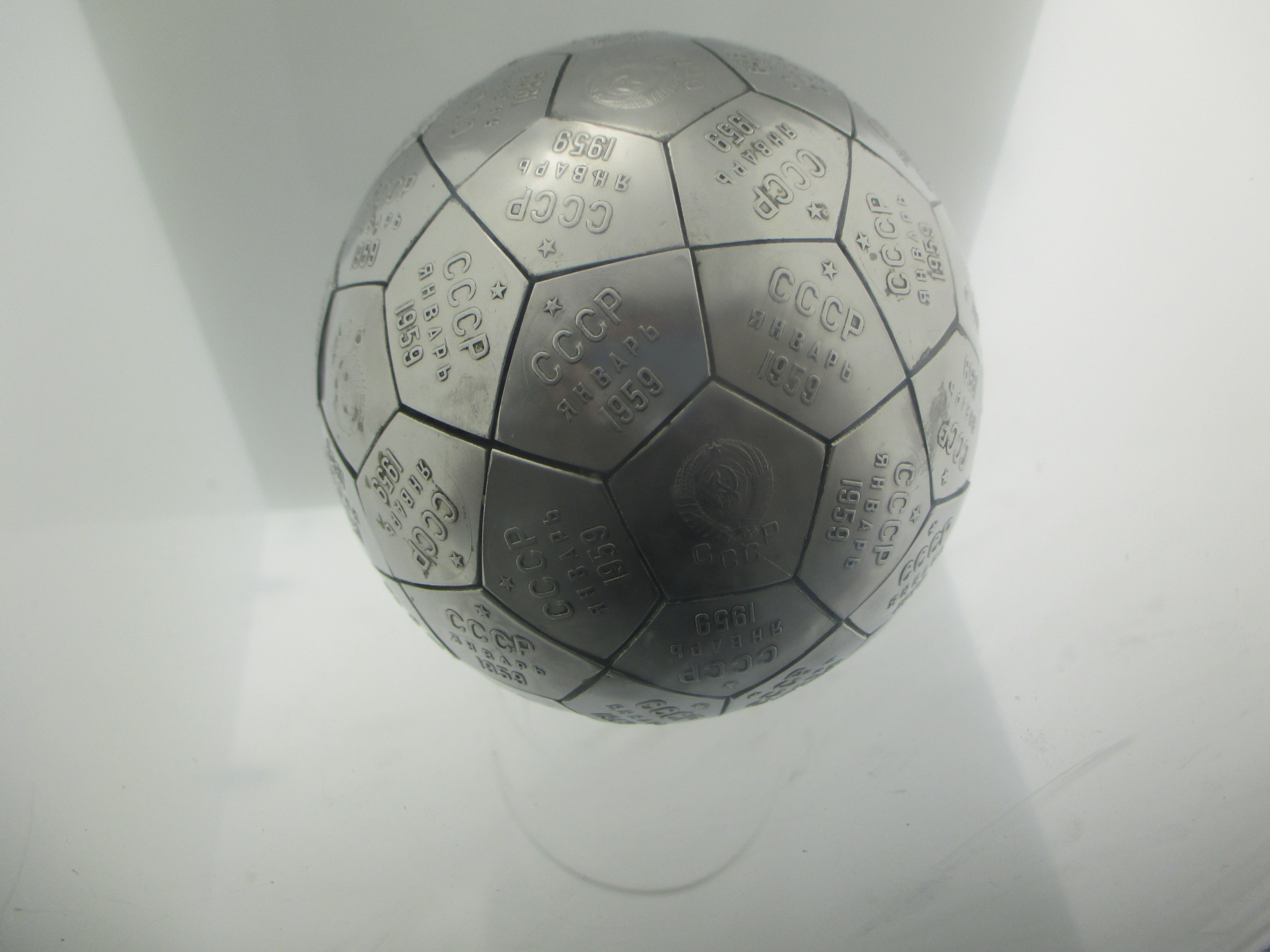
Replica of the Lunik 2 object left on Moon

- A man-made object landed on the Moon for the first time in history, as the Soviet satellite Lunik 2 crashed near the Sea of Tranquility at 2202 GMT (5:02 pm in New York, and 12:02 a.m. Monday Moscow time). Astronomers on Earth with telescopes were able to watch the results of the impact, which spread dust and debris over an area of 40 square kilometres (15 sq mi) over five minutes, in a radius of 3.5 kilometres (2.2 mi). The 800-pound (360 kg) metal sphere bore five-sided pieces stamped with the Communist Party emblem, the hammer and sickle.
- The National Games of China, the first of their kind in the People's Republic of China since the Communist rise to power ten years earlier, opened in Beijing with 7,707 athletes from 29 provinces and autonomous regions, along with the People's Liberation Army, to be played over a three-week period. Chinese leaders, CCP chairman Mao Zedong, president Liu Shaoqi, premier Zhou Enlai and vice-president Zhu De presided over the opening ceremony, which was attended by delegations from nine Communist nations, as well as France and the Sudan. Official slogans of the games exhorted everyone to "exercise the body" and to "protect and serve the construction of the Great Socialist Motherland" and "serve the development of Industry and Agriculture".
- Born: Jean Smart, American TV actress known for Designing Women; in Seattle

== September 14, 1959 (Monday) ==
- The Soviet Union announced the success of Lunik 2 on Radio Moscow with the words "Today, the 14th of September, at 00:02:24 Moscow time, the second Soviet cosmic rocket reached the surface of the moon. It is the first time in history that a cosmic flight has been made from the earth to another celestial body." Speaking at a news conference for the Soviet Academy of Sciences, Leonid Sedov emphasized that the USSR had "no territorial claims whatsoever" on the Moon.
- For the first time, a radar signal was sent, and the echo received, from the planet Venus.
- President Eisenhower signed the Landrum–Griffin Act into law, after it had passed the Senate 95–2 and the House 353–52.
- Born: Morten Harket, Norwegian lead singer for a-ha; in Kongsberg

== September 15, 1959 (Tuesday) ==
- Television was introduced in India, with a station going on the air in Delhi as a project of UNESCO. Initially, programming was limited to 60 minutes on Tuesdays and Fridays, with 40 minutes of education and 20 of entertainment, to be seen at community viewing centers (Tele Clubs) and schools.
- Soviet leader Nikita Khrushchev arrived for an 11-day visit in the United States, landing at Andrews Air Force Base at 11:30 a.m.
- Poe Elementary School attack: At Houston's Edgar Allan Poe Elementary School, a man set off a suitcase bomb at a playground, killing himself, a teacher, a custodian, and three children, including his son. Nineteen other children and the principal were hospitalized. Paul Harold Orgeron had brought in his seven-year-old son minutes earlier to enroll him in the second grade.
- Walter C. Williams was appointed associate director for Project Mercury Operations, and also the prime NASA-Department of Defense contact for Mercury flight operations.
- At the Mayan site of Chichen Itza in Mexico, a local tour guide, José Humberto Gómez, discovered a false wall that concealed a network of caves that became an archaeological treasure trove of the Mayan civilization.

== September 16, 1959 (Wednesday) ==
- At 8:00 p.m. Paris time, President Charles de Gaulle went on television and radio in France and in its colony of Algeria. After five years of war, five billion dollars and more than 21,000 Frenchmen dead, the President said, "I deem it necessary that recourse to self-determination be here and now proclaimed." The options offered, to take place within four years after the end of fighting, would be "secession" (independence), francisation, with the Algerians becoming part of the French people, or "government of Algerians by Algerians, backed up by French help".
- The first successful plain paper copying machine, the Xerox 914, was introduced at a show at the Sherry-Netherland Hotel in New York.
- A federal court in Pennsylvania struck down as unconstitutional a 1928 law that required the reading of ten Bible verses each day in state schools in a case brought by Ellery Schempp.

== September 17, 1959 (Thursday) ==
- In the People's Republic of China, CCP Chairman Mao Zedong issued a Special Pardon order for "the Manchukou war criminal Aisin-Gioro Pu Yi". Puyi had been the nominal Emperor of China during his childhood (1908–1912), and later had been installed by the Japanese as the puppet ruler for the state of Manchukuo. Pu Yi would be released on December 6, and lived until 1967. On the same day, China formally announced that Defense Minister Peng Dehuai had been removed from office and replaced by Lin Biao.
- A British proposal for worldwide disarmament was presented to the United Nations by Foreign Secretary Selwyn Lloyd. The three-stage program called for an international control agency to oversee reduction of stockpiles of nuclear and other mass destruction weapons, and eventually reducing conventional weapons and manpower to levels required only for internal security. A Soviet proposal was presented by First Secretary Khrushchev the next day.
- The first navigation satellite, Transit 1A, was launched from Cape Canaveral, but failed to reach orbit when the third stage of a Thor-Able rocket failed. Transit 1B would be placed into orbit on April 13, 1960, and the launch of Transit 5A1 on December 19, 1962, was the first to become operational. Navigational satellites eventually paved the way for products based on GPS (global positioning system).

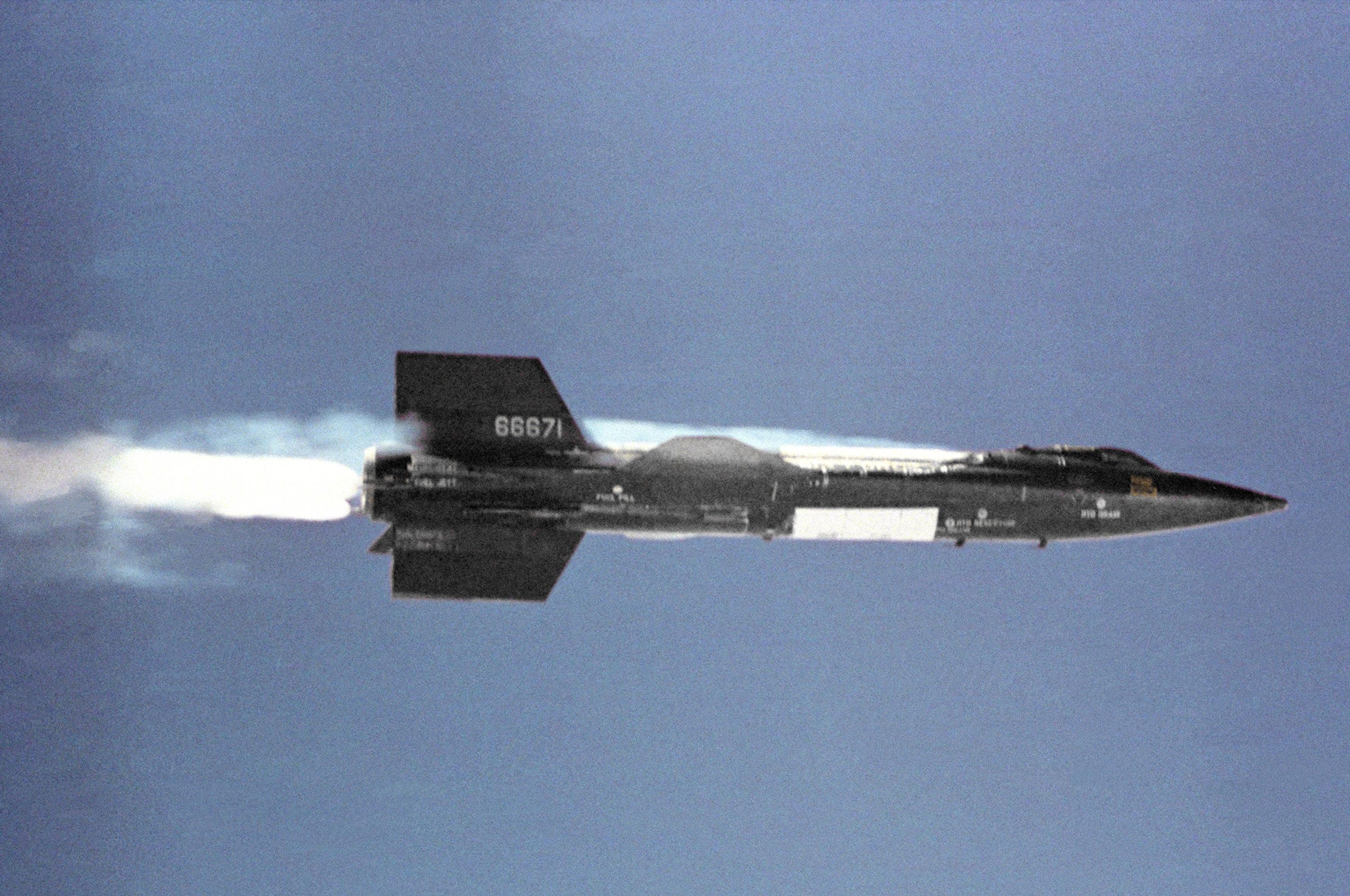
September 17, 1959: North American X-15 makes first powered flight, takes human pilot above 100 kilometers altitude into outer space

- The North American X-15 jet fighter made its first powered flight, with test pilot Scott Crossfield guiding it. A B-52 bomber carried the X-15 to 38,000 feet (12,000 m) over Edwards AFB, and Crossfield then launched to 50,000 feet (15,000 m). The X-15 could reach a maximum altitude of 67 miles (108 km), sufficient to put it into space although not into orbit.

== September 18, 1959 (Friday) ==
- The jetway, the extending bridge that permits airline passengers to travel directly between the terminal and the airplane door without going outside, was used by airline passengers for the first time. Installed on July 22 at the Atlanta airport by Delta Air Lines, the new device was inaugurated with the first commercial use of the Douglas DC-8, a competitor to the Boeing 707. Both Delta and United flew inaugural DC-8 flights on the same day. Delta Air Lines Flight 823, the airline's first DC-8 flight, arrived in Atlanta from New York to coincide with the first use of the jetway. The United Air Lines DC-8 took off from San Francisco at 11:03 a.m. Pacific Time with 113 passengers, five stewardesses and a flight crew of four led by Captain J. A. McFadden, and landed at New York's Idlewild Airport 5 hours and 19 minutes later at 7:22 p.m. Eastern time.
- Soviet Premier Nikita Khrushchev spoke at the United Nations in New York to outline a proposed four-year disarmament plan. The Soviet presentation was more drastic than the British of the day before, calling for initial reduction of the armed forces of the USSR, US and China to 1.7 million members, followed by liquidation of all foreign military bases, and eventually destruction of all nuclear, chemical and bacteriological weapons and rockets.
- Serial killer Harvey Glatman, who posed as a photographer and lured his victims through classified ads, was executed in California's gas chamber.
- Memphis State University (now the University of Memphis) admitted its first black students. The "Memphis State 8" began classes without incident, but were restricted from "white" areas of the campus.
- Born:
  - Sérgio Britto, Brazilian singer and keyboardist; in Rio de Janeiro
  - Ryne Sandberg, American baseball player and manager; in Spokane, Washington (d. 2025)

== September 19, 1959 (Saturday) ==
- The most memorable portion of Nikita Khrushchev's 11-day tour of the United States was his stop in Los Angeles. The Soviet leader was outraged by a speech made by L.A. Mayor Norris Poulson at a banquet, offended by a performance of can-can dancers, and annoyed that he would not be allowed to visit Disneyland. Khrushchev complained at a Hollywood reception, "I asked 'Why not? What do you have there-- rocket launch pads?'" After Poulson's speech, Khrushchev responded, "I can just go, and one never knows whether another head of a Soviet government will ever visit this country." Days later, Khrushchev calmed down, blaming the Disneyland cancellation on legitimate security concerns, and saying of Poulson, "Perhaps he got out of the wrong side of the bed."

== September 20, 1959 (Sunday) ==
- General Nadhim Tabaqchali and 18 other Iraqi officers were executed by a firing squad for their role in the March 1959 Mosul Uprising.
- Born: Danny Devos, Belgian performance artist; in Vilvoorde

== September 21, 1959 (Monday) ==
- The Ford Falcon was introduced in a closed-circuit TV press conference. The automobile would be produced until January 1, 1970. On the same day, the first Plymouth Valiant came off of the assembly line at the Chrysler plant in Hamtramck, Michigan.
- Public Law 86-341 was enacted under the title "An act to extend Agricultural Trade Development and Assistance Act of 1954, and for other purposes". The "other purposes", in the amendment to a law regarding the export of surplus farm goods, included a law authorizing the U.S. Secretary of Agriculture to operate a food stamp program. The first use of Food Stamps came on May 29, 1961.

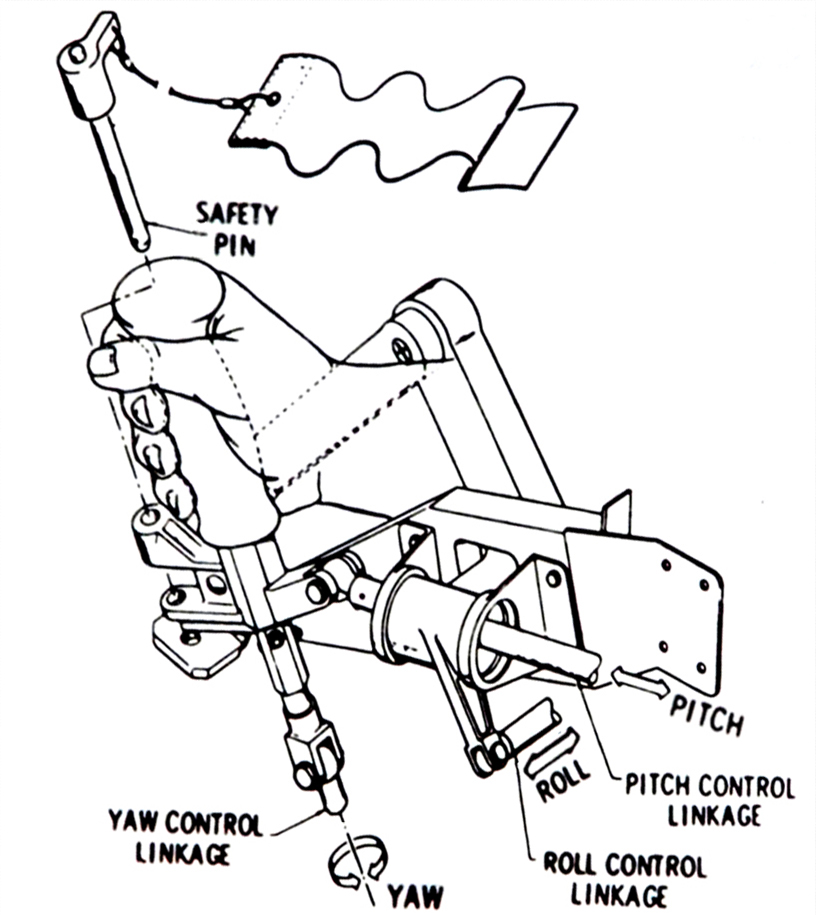
Three-axis hand controller

- A research program began at the Aviation Medical Acceleration Laboratory to measure the effects of sustained acceleration on the pilot's ability to control a vehicle, and would last until October 10. Various side-arm controllers were used, and it appeared that the three-axis type (yaw, roll, and pitch) was the most satisfactory. Later this configuration was extensively evaluated and adopted for use in the control system of the Mercury spacecraft.
- Born:
  - Dave Coulier, American comedian and actor known for being "Joey Gladstone" in TV's Full House; in Detroit
  - Stan Van Gundy, NBA head coach for three teams, guiding the Orlando Magic 2007 to 2012, the Detroit Pistons 2014 to 2018 and the 2020–2021 New Orleans Pelicans; in Indio, California
- Died: Abraham Flexner, 92, American educator and reformer

== September 22, 1959 (Tuesday) ==
- The USS Patrick Henry, the second American ballistic missile submarine, was launched in Groton, Connecticut. The wife of Illinois congressman Leslie C. Arends smashed the bottle of champagne on the prow of the Polaris submarine in a ceremony before 20,000 people. The first ballistic sub, the USS George Washington (SSBN-598), had been launched on June 9.
- The Chicago White Sox won the American League pennant for the first time in 40 years with a 4–2 victory over the second-place Cleveland Indians. Air raid sirens were sounded at 10:30 on authorization by Chicago Fire Commissioner Robert Quinn. At least one-third of Chicagoans surveyed later said that they thought that the sirens were a warning of an impending attack.
- The Havana Sugar Kings beat the Richmond Virginians to win the championship of baseball's AAA International League before 13,021 fans, including Cuban leader Fidel Castro. The Havana team would be moved to Jersey City, New Jersey, after the season.

== September 23, 1959 (Wednesday) ==
- Walter F. Munford, the President of United States Steel, was fatally injured while putting away kitchen utensils at his summer home in Chatham, Massachusetts. Munford, exhausted from the ongoing steelworkers strike, slipped on the waxed kitchen floor and a paring knife in his hand cut 3 inches (76 mm) deep into his abdomen. Complications from the wound contributed to his death five days later.
- After visits to Washington, D.C., New York City, Los Angeles and San Francisco, Soviet Premier Nikita Khrushchev visited Coon Rapids, Iowa, and had dinner at the farm of Roswell Garst.
- Born: Jason Alexander (stage name for Jay Scott Greenspan), American stage, TV and film actor, known for being a Tony Award winner for Best Actor in 1989, and for the role of "George Costanza" in Seinfeld from 1989 to 1998; in Newark, New Jersey

== September 24, 1959 (Thursday) ==
- In the race to be the first to photograph the far side of the Moon, the United States suffered a setback when the Atlas-Able rocket exploded on the launch pad during tests. The rocket was being readied for an October 3 launch, when the Moon would be within 219,000 miles (352,000 km) of the Earth, and would have carried a satellite into lunar orbit. The explosion pushed the launch back to November. The Soviet probe Lunik 3 would be launched on October 4 and photograph the far side two days later.
- A plane crash in France killed 54 people, with only 11 survivors. The Transports Aériens Intercontinentaux (TAI) Douglas DC-7 plowed into a forest in France, shortly after taking off from Bordeaux toward Bamako in what is now the West African nation of Mali. All nine of the crew, and 45 of the 56 passengers, died.

== September 25, 1959 (Friday) ==
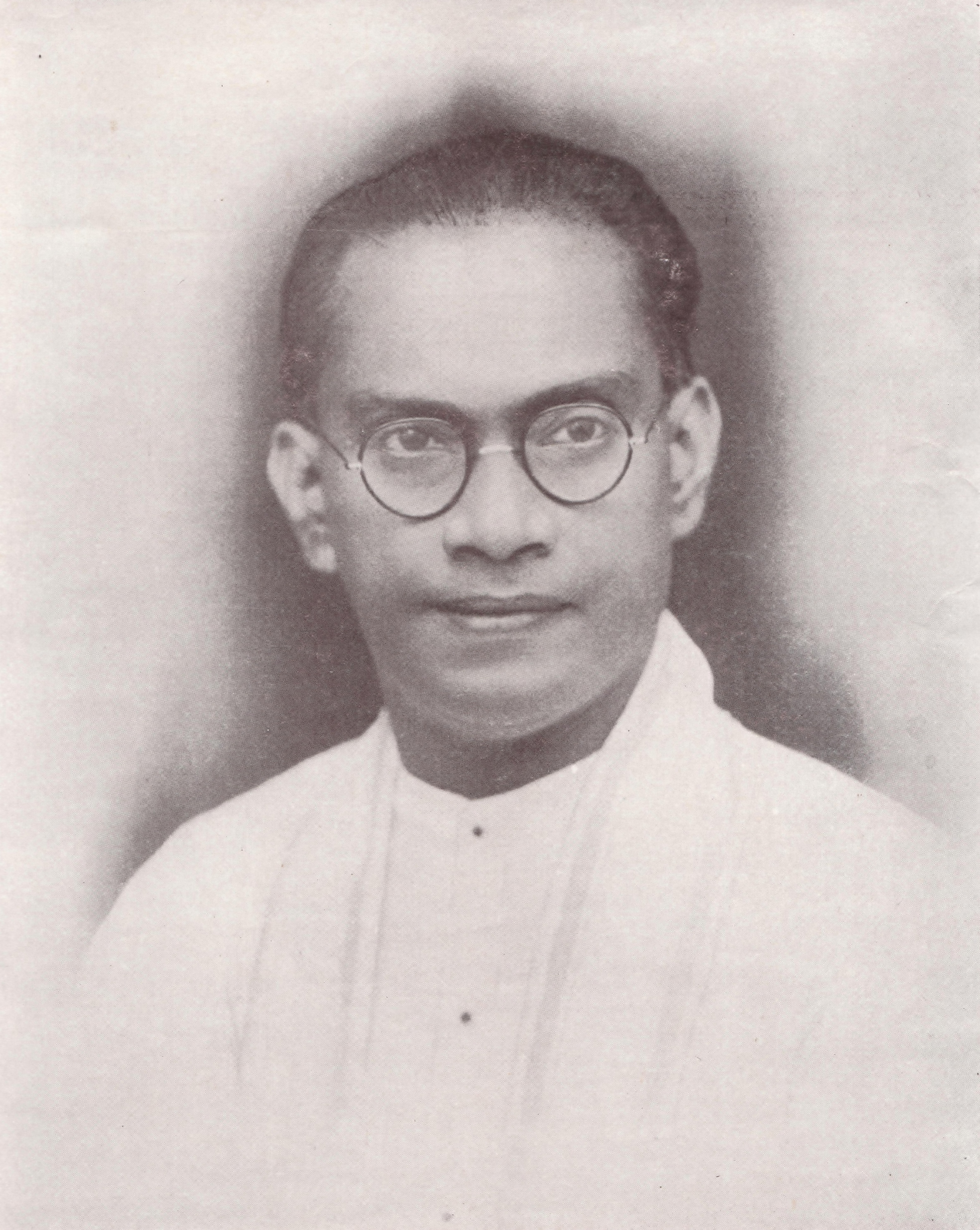
S.W.R.D. Bandaranaike, 1899–1959

- S. W. R. D. Bandaranaike, the 60-year-old prime minister of Ceylon (now Sri Lanka), was assassinated outside his home in Colombo, by Buddhist priest Talduwe Somarama. Bandaranaike died of his gunshot wounds the next day and was succeeded by Wijeyananda Dahanayake. Somarama was hanged in 1962.

== September 26, 1959 (Saturday) ==
- The "Isewan Typhoon", also known as Typhoon Vera, killed more than 5,000 people in Japan, injuring over 32,000 and leaving 1.5 million people homeless after striking Nagoya. The strongest storm ever recorded in Japan, the typhoon had winds as high as 160 miles per hour (260 km/h) and brought a 17-foot (5.2 m) high wave inland, then moved across Japan.
- Unable to persuade businesses to spend thousands of dollars to buy its copy machines, the Haloid Xerox Company introduced a leasing program that would become a model followed by other businesses. The $95 per month lease could be cancelled on 15 days notice, and included repairs and 2,000 copies each month, 4¢ per copy afterward. Created by the consulting firm of Arthur D. Little and Associates, the program increased Xerox annual revenues from $30 million to $2.5 billion by 1972.

== September 27, 1959 (Sunday) ==
- Nikita Khrushchev and Dwight D. Eisenhower held their final conversations, including points for Khrushchev to deliver later in the week to CCP chairman Mao Zedong in China. Khrushchev returned to the Soviet Union the next day, and then flew the day after to Beijing.
- The Los Angeles Dodgers and the Milwaukee Braves finished tied for first place in the National League, with identical 86–68 records.
- Vince Lombardi made his NFL coaching debut in guiding the Green Bay Packers to a 9–6 upset of the Chicago Bears. The Packers had a 1–10–1 record in 1958, finished 7–5–0 in Lombardi's first year, and reached the NFL title game the year after.

== September 28, 1959 (Monday) ==
- Rochester College (formerly North Central Christian College and Michigan Christian Junior College) began its first classes. The private 4-year college is located in Rochester Hills, Michigan.
- Space Task Group's (STG) New Projects Panel discussed the McDonnell Aircraft Corporation proposals for follow-up experiments using Project Mercury capsules. Chairman H. Kurt Strass asked for further studies to provide STG with suggestions for action. Discussion at the panel's next meeting on October 5 centered on McDonnell's proposals. All had shortcomings, but the panel felt that potentially valuable elements might be combined into a single proposal promising increased spacecraft performance and an opportunity to evaluate some advanced mission concepts at an early date.
- The Quick Draw McGraw Show was first broadcast, as a cartoon syndicated by Hanna-Barbera, and introduced several well-known characters, along with the "guitar smash" sound effect. The three segments spoofed Westerns (Quick Draw McGraw and Baba Looey), detective shows (Super Snooper and Blabbermouse), and family shows (Augie Doggie and Doggy Daddy).
- Born: Laura Bruce, American artist; in East Orange, New Jersey
- Died:
  - Rudolf Caracciola, 58, German race car driver and European Grand Prix champion 1935, 1937 and 1938
  - Vincent Richards, 56, the first (in 1927) American professional tennis champion

== September 29, 1959 (Tuesday) ==
- The Brunei Constitution and Agreement of 1959 gave the British colony of Brunei its first written Constitution and protectorate status. Great Britain was given complete control of the external affairs of the South Pacific nation, while the Sultan, Omar Ali Saifuddin III, presided over an Executive Council. Brunei became fully independent in 1984.
- Braniff Flight 542 from Houston to Washington broke apart at 11:07 p.m. CST while at an altitude of 15,000 feet (4,600 m), killing all 33 people on board. The Lockheed L-188 Electra had lost a wing from structural failure. Another Electra, Northwest Flight 710, would lose a wing and crash on March 17, 1960.
- The Dodgers beat the Braves 6–5 to win a playoff for the National League pennant, and advanced to the World Series.
- Born: Benjamin Sehene, Rwandan author; in Kigali, Ruanda-Urundi

== September 30, 1959 (Wednesday) ==
- Three days after departing the United States, where he had met with President Dwight D. Eisenhower, Soviet Premier Nikita Khrushchev began talks with the Chinese Communist Party's Chairman Mao Zedong in Beijing. In 1967, Khrushchev would tell an interviewer from the West German magazine Stern that "In 1959 Mao Tse-tung said to me, 'We must just provoke the United States into a war, then I will send you as many divisions as you need— 100, 200, 1,000'."
- President Eisenhower hosted leaders of U.S. Steel, Bethlehem Steel and Inland Steel at the White House, followed by officials of the United Steel Workers, and set a deadline of October 8 for labor and management to settle the nationwide steel strike.
- Born:
  - Xiomara Castro, President of Honduras since 2022, and the former First Lady (as the wife of Manuel Zelaya) from 2006 to 2009 in Santa Bárbara
  - Ettore Messina, Italian pro basketball coach for Virtus Bologna and CSKA Moscow; in Catania, Sicily
- Died: Sid Richardson, 68, bachelor philanthropist and Texas oil multimillionaire
