= USS Thetis Bay =

Casablanca-class escort carrier of the U.S. Navy

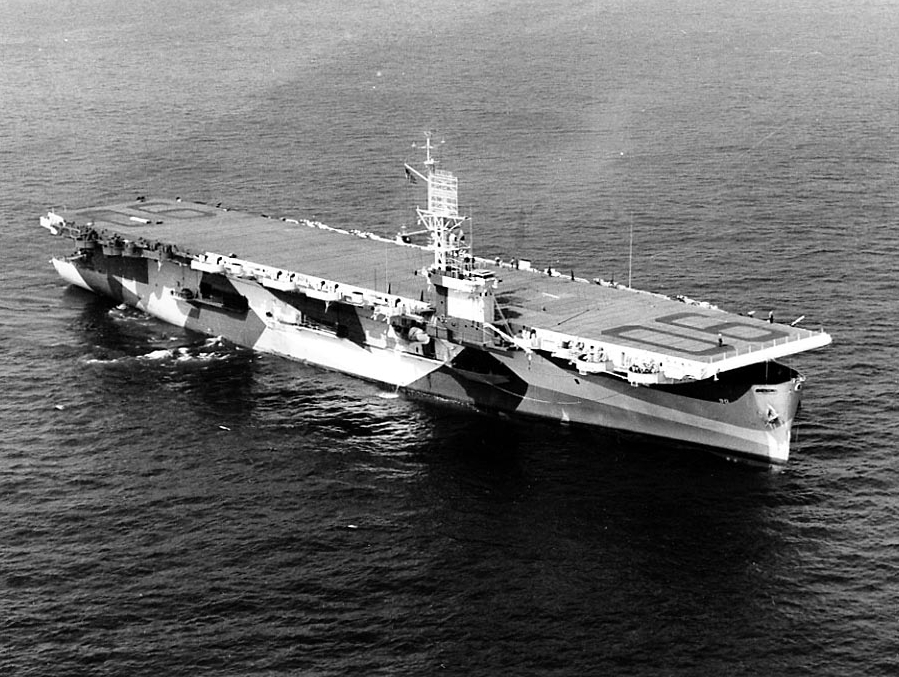
- USS Thetis Bay underway on 7 August 1944. The ship is painted in Measure 33, Design 10A camouflage.

History

United States
- Name: Thetis Bay
- Namesake: Thetis Bay, Kuiu Island, Alaska
- Ordered: as a Type S4-S2-BB3 hull, MC hull 1127
- Awarded: 18 June 1942
- Builder: Kaiser Shipyards
- Laid down: 22 December 1943
- Launched: 16 March 1944
- Commissioned: 12 April 1944
- Decommissioned: 7 August 1946
- Identification: CVE-90 (1944–55); CVHA-1 (1955–59); LPH-6 (1959–64)
- Recommissioned: 20 July 1956
- Decommissioned: 1 March 1964
- Reclassified: 1 July 1955
- Stricken: 1 March 1964
- Honors and awards: 1 battle star
- Fate: Scrapped in 1966

General characteristics
- Class & type: Casablanca-class escort carrier
- Displacement: 8,188 long tons (8,319 t) (standard); 10,902 long tons (11,077 t) (full load)
- Length: 512 ft 3 in (156.13 m) (oa); 490 ft (150 m) (wl); 474 ft (144 m) (fd)
- Beam: 65 ft 2 in (19.86 m); 108 ft (33 m) (extreme width)
- Draft: 20 ft 9 in (6.32 m) (max)
- Installed power: 4 × Babcock & Wilcox boilers; 9,000 shp (6,700 kW)
- Propulsion: 2 × Skinner Unaflow reciprocating steam engines; 2 × screws
- Speed: 19 knots (35 km/h; 22 mph)
- Range: 10,240 nmi (18,960 km; 11,780 mi) at 15 kn (28 km/h; 17 mph)
- Complement: Total: 910 – 916 officers and men; Embarked Squadron: 50 – 56; Ship's Crew: 860
- Armament: As designed: 1 × 5 in (127 mm)/38 cal dual-purpose gun; 4 × twin 40 mm (1.57 in) Bofors anti-aircraft guns; 12 × 20 mm (0.79 in) Oerlikon anti-aircraft cannons; Varied, ultimate armament: 1 × 5 in (127 mm)/38 cal dual-purpose gun; 8 × twin 40 mm (1.57 in) Bofors anti-aircraft guns; 20 × 20 mm (0.79 in) Oerlikon anti-aircraft cannons
- Aircraft carried: 27
- Aviation facilities: 1 × catapult; 2 × elevators

Service record
- Part of: United States Pacific Fleet (1944–1946); Pacific Reserve Fleet (1946–1956); United States Pacific Fleet (1956–1961); United States Atlantic Fleet (1961–1964); Atlantic Reserve Fleet (1964)
- Operations: Operation Magic Carpet

USS Thetis Bay (CVE-90) was the thirty-sixth of fifty Casablanca-class escort carriers built for the United States Navy during World War II. She was launched in March 1944, commissioned in April, and served as a transport carrier in the Pacific, as well as a replenishment carrier supporting the Allied bombardment of Tokyo and the Main Islands. Postwar, she participated in Operation Magic Carpet, before being decommissioned in August 1946, being mothballed in the Pacific Reserve Fleet. She was reactivated in July 1956, and converted to a helicopter transport carrier, serving in relief operations in Taiwan and Haiti. Ultimately, she was broken up in 1966, the last Casablanca-class hull to be scrapped.

== Design and description ==
A side profile of the design of Thetis Bay.

Thetis Bay was a Casablanca-class escort carrier, the most numerous type of aircraft carriers ever built. Built to stem heavy losses during the Battle of the Atlantic, they came into service in late 1943, by which time the U-boat threat was already in retreat. Although some did see service in the Atlantic, the majority were utilized in the Pacific, ferrying aircraft, providing logistics support, and conducting close air support for the island-hopping campaigns. The Casablanca-class carriers were built on the standardized Type S4-S2-BB3 hull, a lengthened variant of the Doyen-class hull, and specifically designed to be mass-produced using welded prefabricated sections. This allowed them to be produced at unprecedented speeds: the final ship of her class, Munda, was delivered to the Navy just 101 days after the laying of her keel.

Thetis Bay was 512 ft 3 in (156.13 m) long overall (490 ft (150 m) at the waterline), had a beam of 65 ft 2 in (19.86 m), and a draft of 20 ft 9 in (6.32 m). She displaced 8,188 long tons (8,319 t) standard, which increased to 10,902 long tons (11,077 t) with a full load. To carry out flight operations, the ship had a 257 ft (78 m) hangar deck and a 474 ft (144 m) flight deck. Her compact size necessitated the installation of an aircraft catapult at her bow, and there were two aircraft elevators to facilitate movement of aircraft between the flight and hangar deck: one each fore and aft.

She was powered by four Babcock & Wilcox Express D boilers that raised 285 psi (1,970 kPa) of steam at 577 °F (303 °C). The steam generated by these boilers fed two Skinner Unaflow reciprocating steam engines, delivering 9,000 hp (6,700 kW) to two propeller shafts. This allowed her to reach speeds of 19 kn (35 km/h; 22 mph), with a cruising range of 10,240 nmi (18,960 km; 11,780 mi) at 15 kn (28 km/h; 17 mph). For armament, one 5 in (127 mm)/38 caliber dual-purpose gun was mounted on the stern. Additional anti-aircraft defense was provided by eight Bofors 40 mm (1.57 in) anti-aircraft guns in single mounts and twelve Oerlikon 20 mm (0.79 in) cannons mounted around the perimeter of the deck. By 1945, Casablanca-class carriers had been modified to carry twenty Oerlikon cannons and sixteen Bofors guns; the doubling of the latter was accomplished by putting them into twin mounts. Sensors onboard consisted of a SG surface-search radar and a SK air-search radar.

Although Casablanca-class escort carriers were intended to function with a crew of 860 and an embarked squadron of 50 to 56, the exigencies of wartime often necessitated the inflation of the crew count. They were designed to operate with 27 aircraft, but the hangar deck could accommodate much more during transport or training missions.

Following her conversion into a helicopter assault carrier, she was 512 ft 3 in (156.13 m) long overall, had a beam of 65 ft 2 in (19.86 m), and a draft of 22 ft 6 in (6.86 m). She displaced 7,800 long tons (7,900 t) standard and 11,000 long tons (11,000 t) with a full load, and could make 19.3 knots (35.7 km/h; 22.2 mph) at full speed. She had a designed complement of 900 crew and 938 troops, was armed with four twin 40 mm (1.6 in) anti-aircraft guns, and carried twenty helicopters.

== Construction ==
Her construction was awarded to Kaiser Shipbuilding Company in Vancouver, Washington, under a United States Maritime Commission contract, on 18 June 1942. The escort carrier was laid down on 22 December 1943 under the name Thetis Bay, located within Kuiu Island, as part of a tradition which named escort carriers after bays or sounds in Alaska. The bay itself was named by the United States Coast and Geodetic Survey in 1928 after the United States Revenue Cutter Service cutter Thetis, which in turn was named after the sea nymph Thetis, the daughter of Nereus and the mother of Achilles in Greek mythology. She was laid down as MC hull 1127, the thirty-sixth of a series of fifty Casablanca-class escort carriers. She therefore received the classification symbol CVE-90, indicating that she was the ninetieth escort carrier to be commissioned into the United States Navy. She was launched on 16 March 1944; sponsored by Mrs. Rico Botta, the wife of Captain Botta, the Assembly and Repair Officer overseeing Naval Air Station North Island; transferred to the Navy and commissioned on 12 April 1944, with Captain Donald Edmund Wilcox in command. Notably, actress Claudette Colbert's husband, Joel Pressman, a lieutenant commander in the Medical Corps served as the first medical officer at the time of the commissioning.

== Service history ==
=== World War II ===
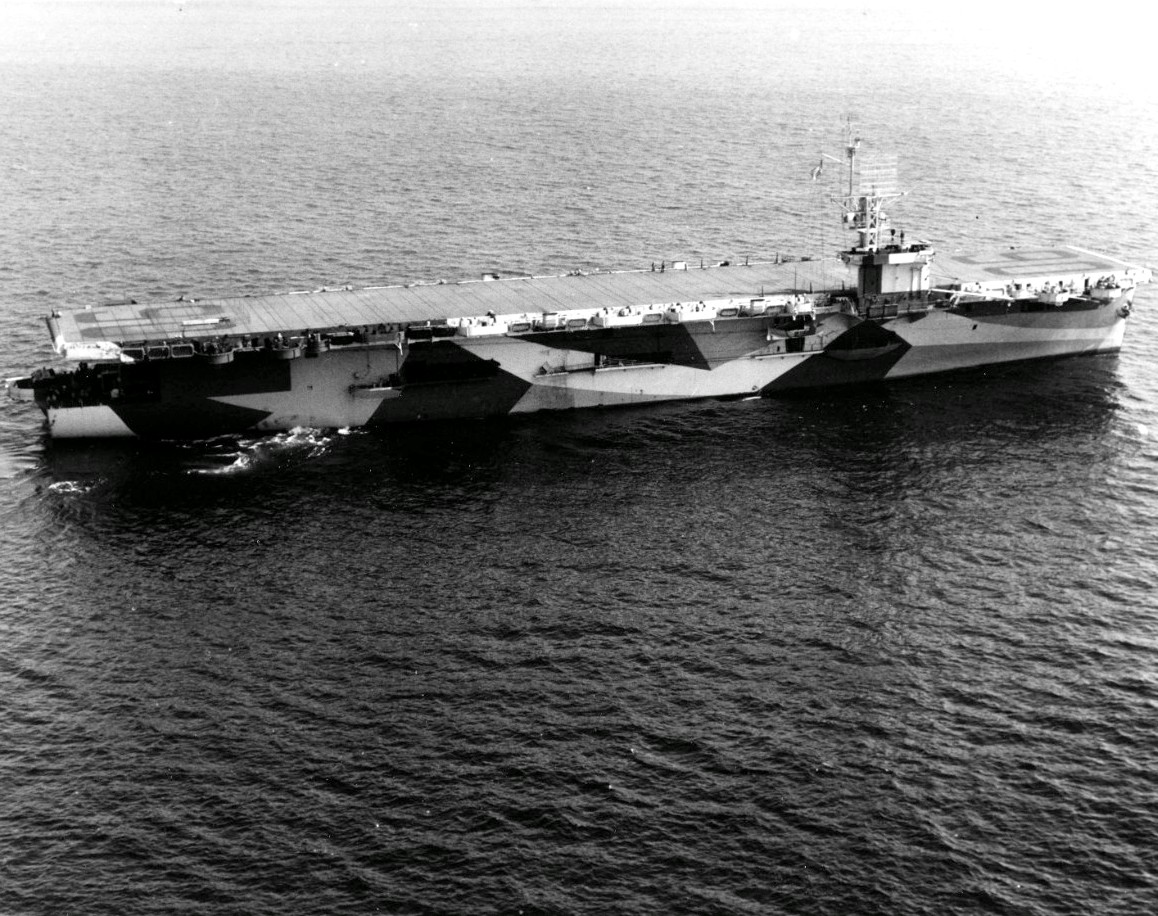
An aerial photo of Thetis Bay's starboard side as it steams westwards in the Pacific, 7 August 1944.

Upon being commissioned, Thetis Bay underwent a shakedown cruise down the West Coast to San Diego, California. Upon finishing, she was assigned to transport duty, and proceeded north towards San Pedro to take on a load of aircraft and passengers. She put out to sea on 5 June, stopped at Pearl Harbor on 11 June, and headed out, via Makin Island of the Gilberts Islands and Majuro of the Marshall Islands, to Kwajalein. There, she took on the 50th Engineer Combat Battalion of the United States Army, which she deposited back at Pearl Harbor on 5 July.

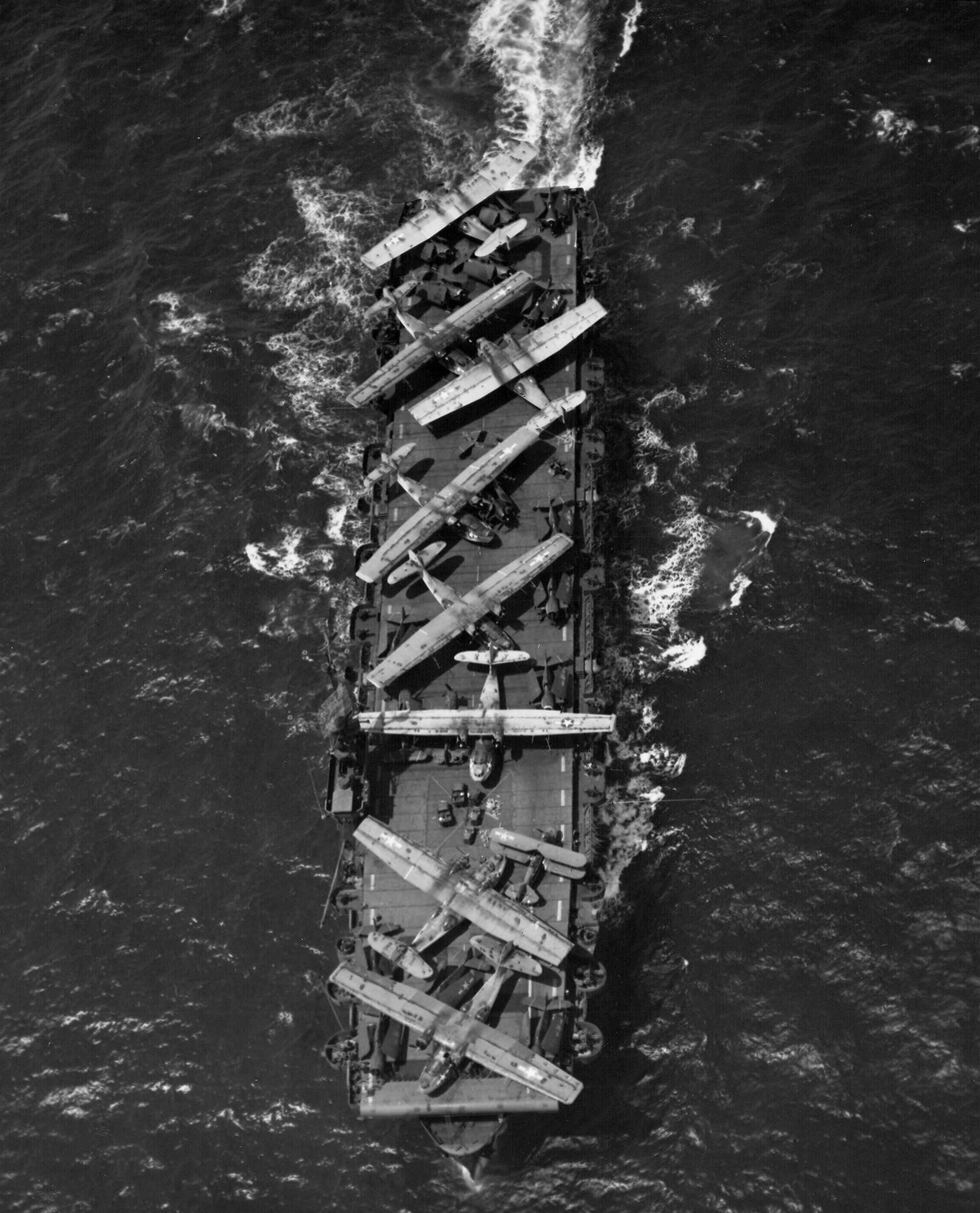
Thetis Bay ferrying inoperable aircraft to NAS Alameda, 8 July 1944. Visible onboard are eight PBY Catalina flying boats, eighteen F6F Hellcat fighters, and a J2F Duck amphibious biplane.

On 7 July, Thetis Bay got underway for Alameda ferrying 41 aircraft that required repairs. She steamed into port on 13 July, and after unloading her cargo, headed for Terminal Island, Los Angeles, for a three-week overhaul. Finishing in August, she resumed transport duties on 11 August, delivering spare parts, replacement aircraft, and military passengers from the West Coast to bases in Hawaii and the Marshalls. After completing her first transport tour on 13 September, she made five more round-trip missions, spanning September 1944 to mid-April 1945, ferrying supplies from the United States to a variety of destinations in the Pacific, ranging from Pearl Harbor to Finschhafen, New Guinea. During this period, Captain Benjamin Eugene Moore Jr. raised his flag over the ship on 21 January 1945.

On 12 June, Thetis Bay steamed into Pearl Harbor carrying a load of aircraft, having departed from San Diego. There, she was assigned to become a replenishment carrier as a part of Task Group 50.8.4, the mobile replenishment group supporting the frontline Fast Carrier Task Force. Replenishment escort carriers such as Thetis Bay enabled the frontline carriers to replace battle losses, and to stay at sea for longer durations of time. She first headed to Apra Harbor in Guam of the Mariana Islands, arriving on 25 June. Then, she headed westwards, making her first rendezvous with the fast carriers on 12 July, when she transferred 40 of her replenishment aircraft. She returned to Guam on 22 July to take on more aircraft, before she departed on 24 July, making another rendezvous on 31 July. She then replenished at Guam, before heading out once again, resupplying the frontline carriers from 14 August to 8 September. As she began her replenishment mission, news broke of the Japanese surrender, and her replenishment aircraft were used to support the initial landings in the Occupation of Japan.

=== Post-war ===
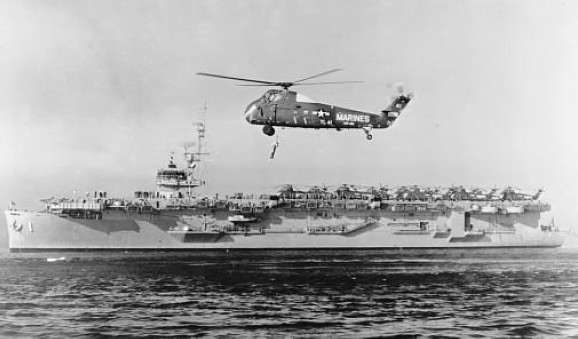
A Sikorsky HUS-1 Seahorse demonstrates a mock rescue at sea, with Thetis Bay in the backdrop. Circa 1955–57, as evidenced by the hull symbol on the bow.

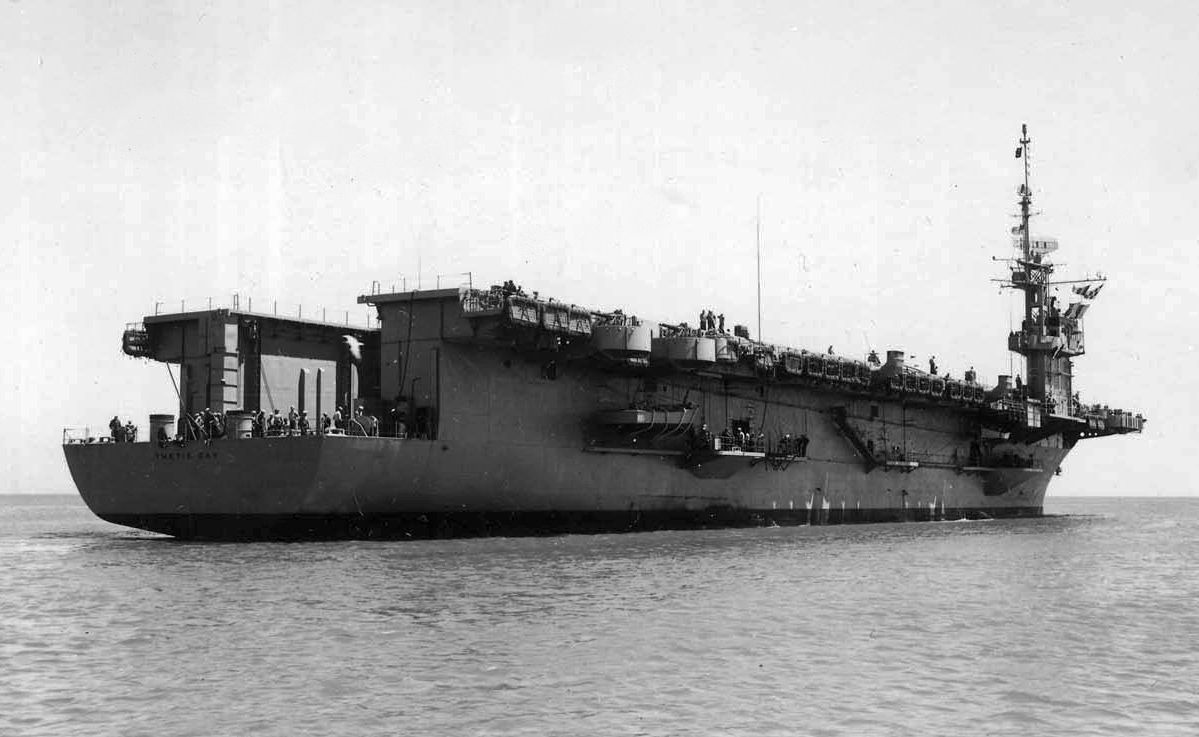
Thetis Bay photographed from the stern in 1956, after it had undergone extensive conversion into a helicopter carrier. The part of the flight deck that has been cut is distinctly visible.

Upon finishing her replenishment mission, Thetis Bay returned to the United States via Guam, arriving at Alameda on 7 September. There, she joined the "Magic Carpet" fleet, which repatriated U.S. servicemen from throughout the Pacific. She cruised around the Pacific, making stops and returning U.S. servicemen back to the mainland. During one of her stops, Captain Allen Smith Jr. took over command of the vessel on 19 October. She completed her "Magic Carpet" duties, and was discharged in January 1946. Inactivation work was conducted in the Naval Inactive Ship Maintenance Facility at Bremerton, Washington. Upon the completion of that work, she was decommissioned and mothballed on 7 August 1946, joining the Tacoma group of the Pacific Reserve Fleet.

In May 1955, Thetis Bay was withdrawn from the Pacific Reserve Fleet and towed to the San Francisco Naval Shipyard under project SCB 122, where she began conversion into the Navy's first assault helicopter aircraft carrier. On 1 July, she was redesignated as such, receiving the hull symbol CVHA-1. Ships of her type were expected to act as a complement to attack transports, providing them with vertical assault capabilities. She was recommissioned on 20 July 1956, with Captain Thomas Winfield South, II, in command. Her conversion was finally completed six weeks later on 1 September, with a portion of the aft section of her flight deck having been cut away.

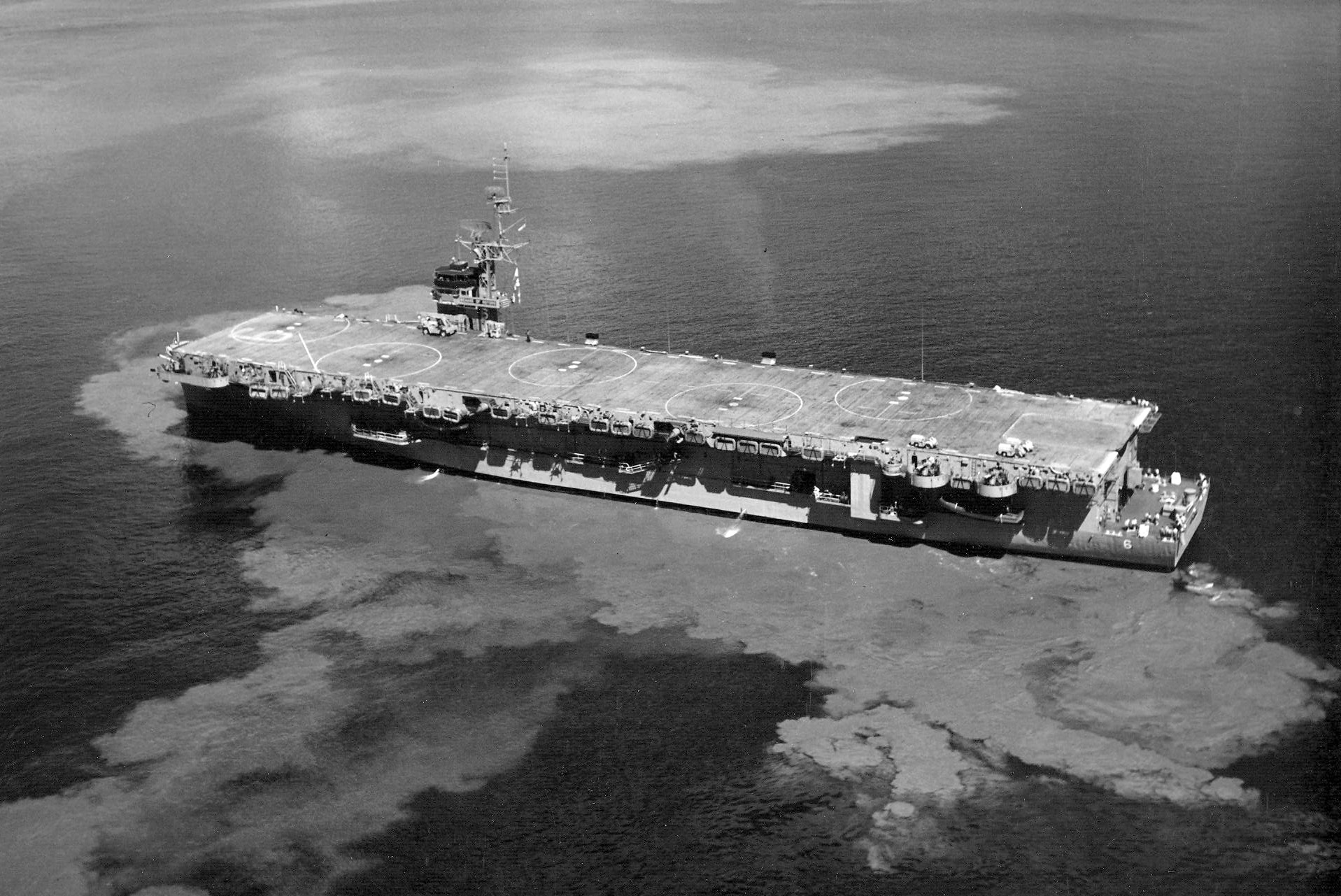
Thetis Bay underway in 1963, location unknown. Note her reconfigured flight deck.

Thetis Bay then proceeded southwards towards her new home part, arriving at Long Beach on 20 September. There, she took on the helicopters of Marine Corps Test Unit No. 1, based at Camp Pendleton, who demonstrated landing and take-off techniques on this novel type of ship. She then participated in amphibious training exercises off of the California coast, evaluating her planned complementary role, before deploying to the Far East on 10 July 1957. Having completed a short tour of duty, she returned to Long Beach on 11 December, where she resumed local operations. During 1958 and 1959, she conducted a variety of operations, including vertical envelopment exercises off of Luzon, the Philippines, throughout February 1958.

On 28 May 1959, she was reclassified as a landing platform helicopter amphibious assault ship, and thus, received the hull symbol LPH-6. In August 1959, severe flooding, starting on 7 August, exacerbated by Typhoon Billie, which had earlier struck in July, killed more than a thousand people in Taiwan. Thus, Thetis Bay, which was serving with the Seventh Fleet at the time, was dispatched from Hong Kong on 12 August, proceeding to Taiwan to conduct relief operations. There, she used her 21 Marine Corps Sikorsky H-34s of Marine Helicopter Transport Squadron (Light) 261 (HMR(L)-261) to ferry aid and transport stranded civilians. She completed her mission on the noon of 20 August, at which point the helicopters had delivered a total of 1,600,540 lb (725,990 kg) of aid. In addition, the helicopters had ferried 850 passengers throughout the operation.

Thetis Bay, in May 1960, took part in a training night assault landing at Camp Pendleton. During the operation, her helicopters carried 1,300 troops and 30 t (30 long tons; 33 short tons) of cargo to the objective area. This practice operation represented the first large-scale night landing of ground forces by helicopters based on board a carrier. She deployed to the western Pacific for the spring of 1961, and upon completing her tour and returning to Long Beach, she was transferred to the United States Atlantic Fleet. She arrived at Norfolk, Virginia, her new home port, in early December 1961.

For the next three years, Thetis Bay operated along the Atlantic coast and in the Caribbean. In October 1962, during the height of the Cuban Missile Crisis, she proceeded into the naval "quarantine" area along with her helicopter contingent and a marine landing team, standing by for potential actions. In the spring of 1963, she ferried special aircraft required for President John F. Kennedy's planned visit to West Germany to Hamburg. In September 1963, she headed to Haiti, which had been affected by Hurricane Flora. She anchored off Port-au-Prince and launched Marine helicopters carrying medical aid and food supplies.

Thetis Bay left Norfolk on 5 January 1964, heading to the Naval Inactive Ship Maintenance Facility in Philadelphia, Pennsylvania, for inactivation work, arriving there on 6 January. There, she was decommissioned, once again, joining the Philadelphia group of the Atlantic Reserve Fleet. She was struck from the Naval Vessel Register on 1 March 1964, and she was sold for scrapping in December 1964 to Peck Iron & Metal Co., Inc., headquartered at Portsmouth, Virginia. She was proposed to be transferred to the Spanish Navy, but the Independence-class light aircraft carrier Cabot was sent in her place. She was ultimately broken up in 1966. Thetis Bay received one battle star for her World War II service. Her name plate is on display at Freedom Park in Omaha, Nebraska.

== Sources ==
=== Online sources ===
- "'Thetis Bay' (CVE-90)". Dictionary of American Naval Fighting Ships. Naval History and Heritage Command. 27 April 2016. Archived from the original on 18 April 2021. This article incorporates text from this source, which is in the public domain.
- "Kaiser Vancouver, Vancouver WA". ShipbuildingHistory.com. 27 November 2010. Archived from the original on 16 June 2019.
- "USS Thetis Bay (LPH-6)". NavSource. 16 October 2020.
- "World Aircraft Carriers List: US Escort Carriers, S4 Hulls". Hazegray.org. 14 December 1998. Archived from the original on 19 November 2021.
- Maksel, Rebecca (14 August 2012). "How Do You Name an Aircraft Carrier?". Air & Space/Smithsonian.

=== Bibliography ===
- Adcock, Al (1996), Escort Carriers in Action - Warships No. 9, Carrollton, Texas: Squadron/Signal Publications, ISBN 9780897473569
- Chesneau, Robert; Gardiner, Robert (1980), Conway's All the World's Fighting Ships 1922–1946, London, England: Naval Institute Press, ISBN 9780870219139
- Friedman, Norman (1983), U.S. Aircraft Carriers: An Illustrated Design History, Annapolis, Maryland: Naval Institute Press, ISBN 9780870217395
- Ross, Al (1993), The Escort Carrier Gambier Bay, Anatomy of the Ship, London, England: Conway Maritime Press, ISBN 9781557502353
- Y'Blood, William (2012), The Little Giants: U.S. Escort Carriers Against Japan, Annapolis, Maryland: Naval Institute Press, ISBN 9781612512471
