= July 1959 =

Month of 1959

<<	July 1959					>>
Su	Mo	Tu	We	Th	Fr	Sa
			1	2	3	4
5	6	7	8	9	10	11
12	13	14	15	16	17	18
19	20	21	22	23	24	25
26	27	28	29	30	31

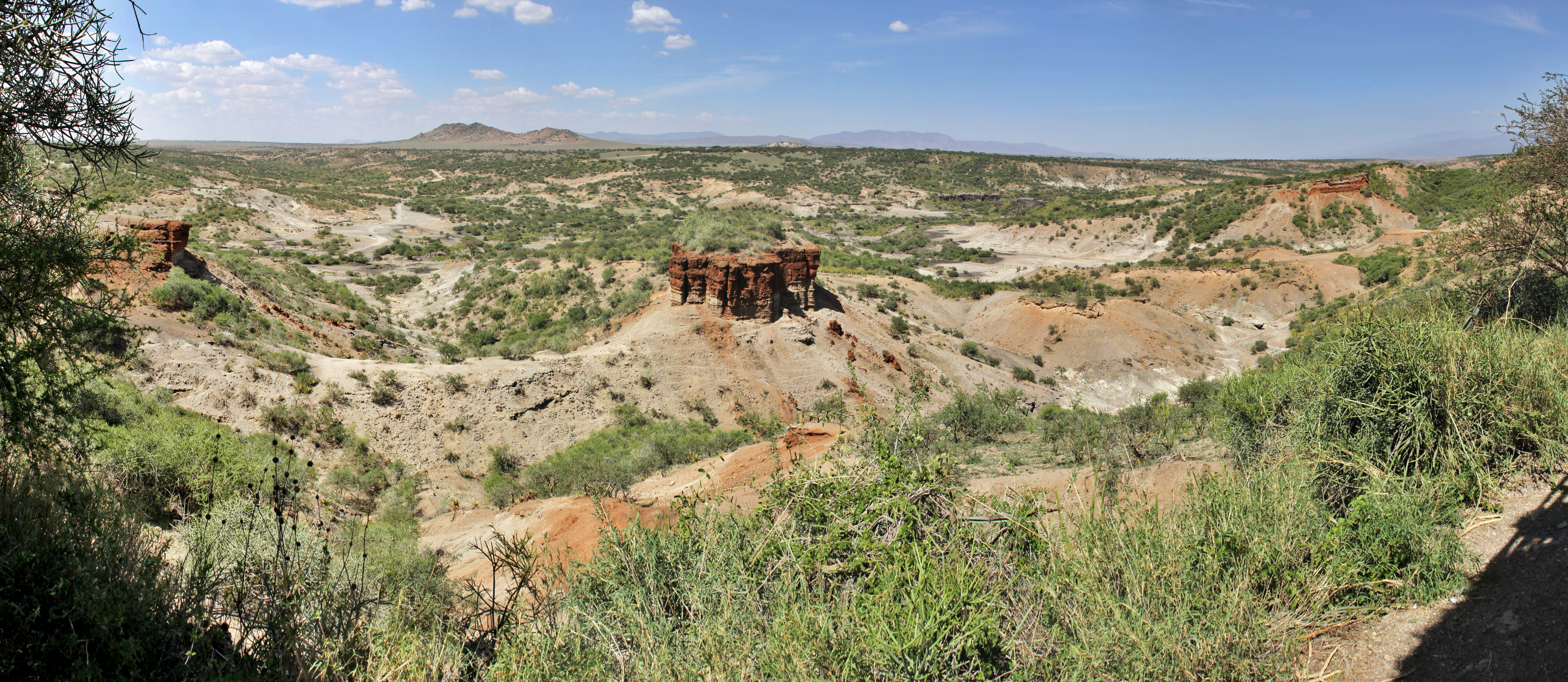
July 17, 1959: Homo habilis remains unearthed after 1,750,000 years in Olduvai Gorge.

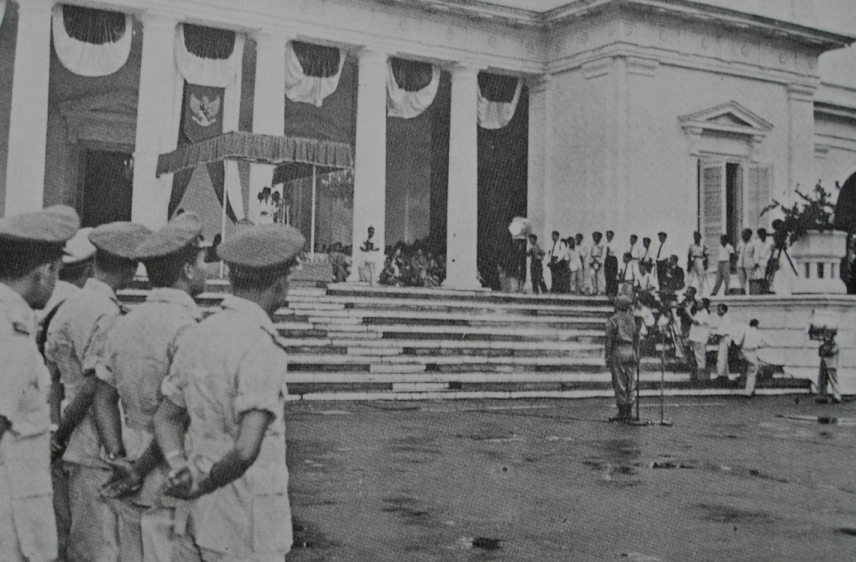
July 5, 1959: Sukarno decrees "Guided Democracy", creates totalitarian state in Indonesia.

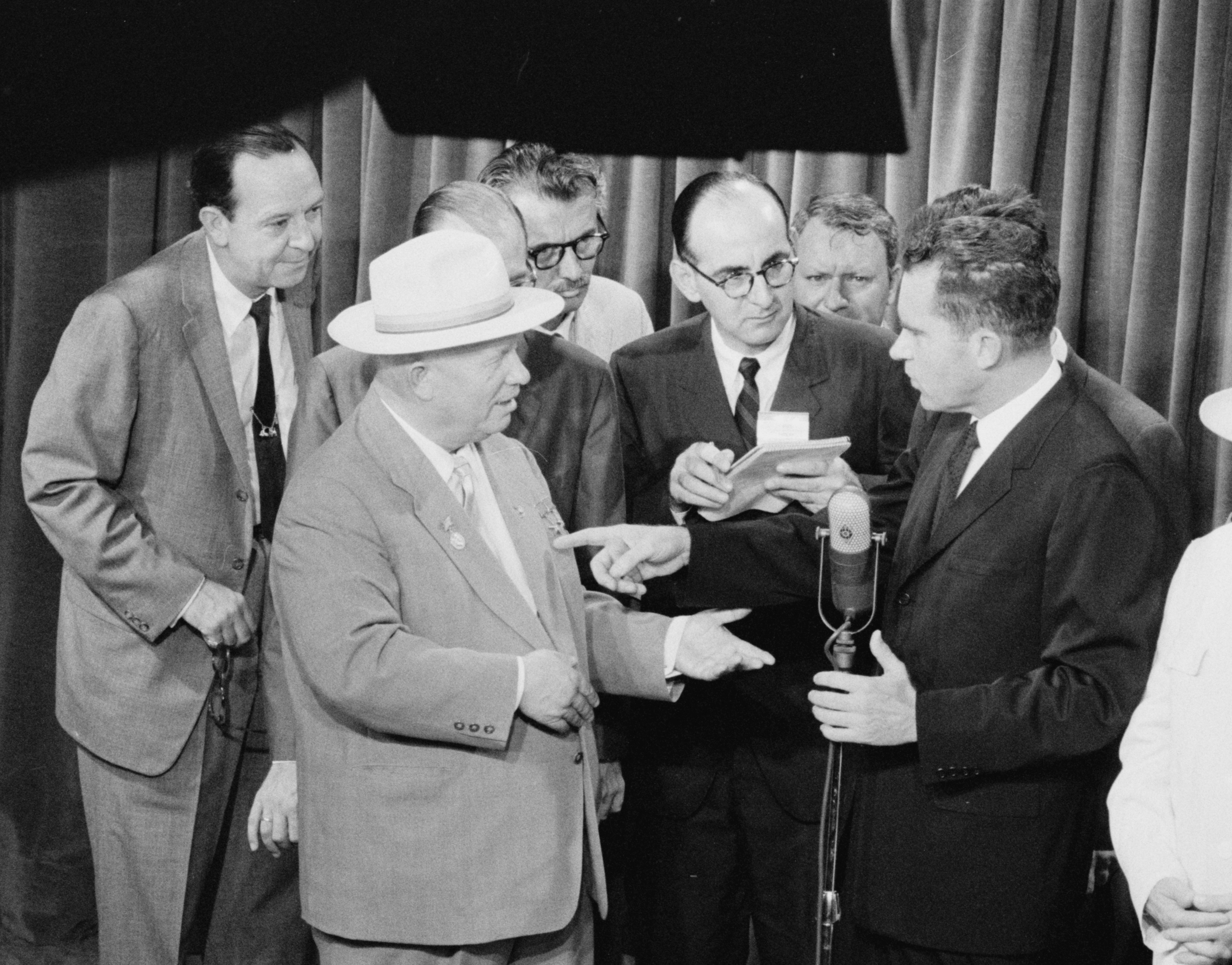
July 24, 1959: Nixon and Khrushchev debate in kitchen exhibit.

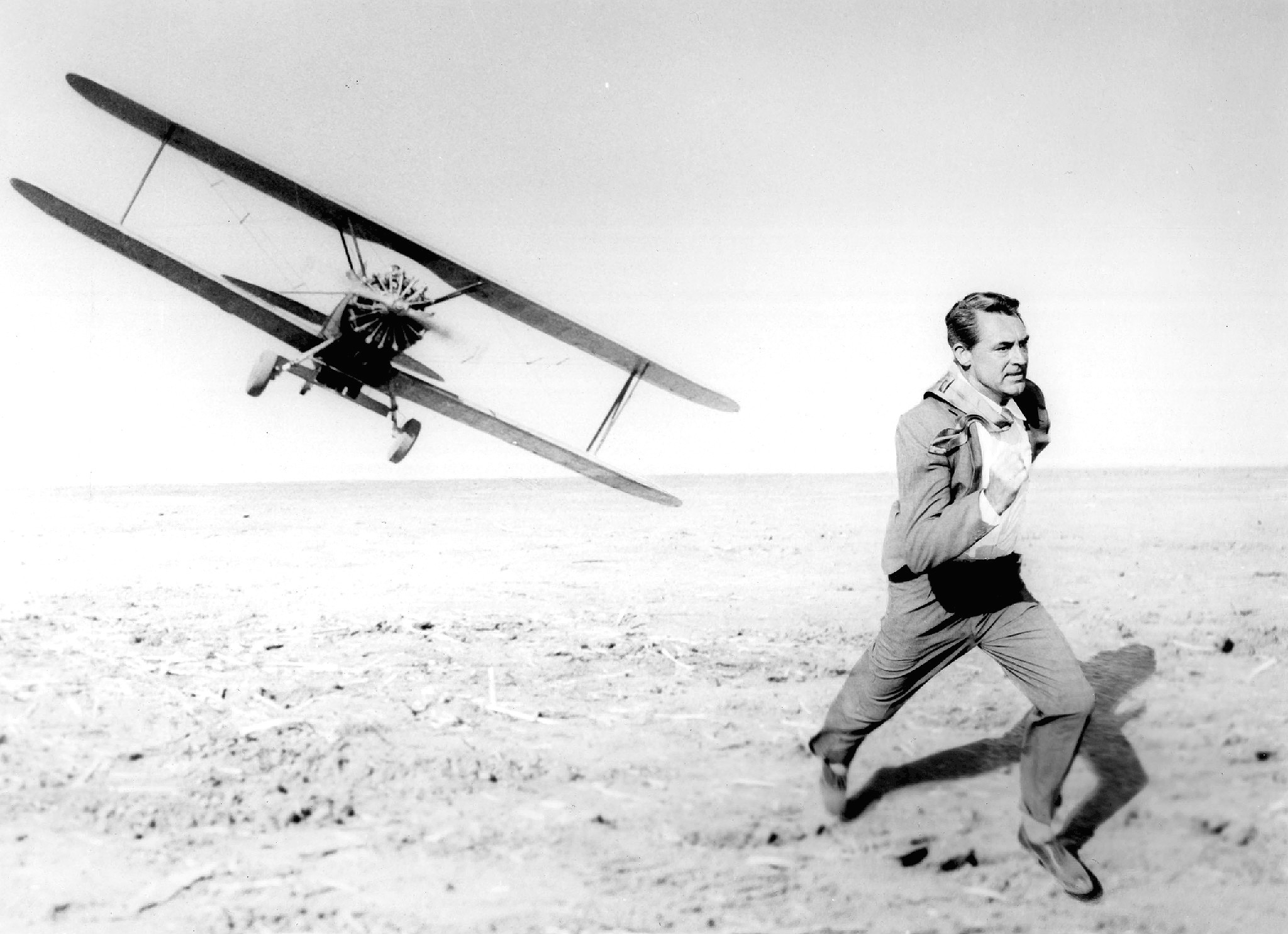
July 18, 1959: Hitchcock thriller North by Northwest premieres in U.S. with Cary Grant.

The following events occurred in July 1959:

== July 1, 1959 (Wednesday) ==
- A new standard for the yard and for the inch was adopted by the United States and Britain. The yard was formally defined as 0.9144 meters, and, as 1/36 of a yard, the inch was 0.0254 m or 2.54 centimeters.
- "World Refugee Year" began for the United Nations, running until June 30, 1960. At that time, the UN estimated that 15,000,000 people were refugees, and campaigned for private contributions and increased government spending.
- At 12:01 a.m., the consumption of opium in Thailand became illegal, and all approved opium dens were closed. When 12:01 arrived, Field Marshal Sarit Thanarat sent the military on a nationwide crackdown on the opium trade.
- Heinrich Lübke was elected the second President of West Germany, succeeding Theodor Heuss. Lübke had 517 of the 1038 electoral votes, 3 shy of a majority, while Carlo Schmid had 385 and Max Becker 104 on the first ballot in the electoral college. Lübke won on the second round.
- The order for Jupiter launch vehicles in support of Project Mercury was canceled because the same or better data could be obtained from Atlas flights.
- On July 1 and 2, a pressure suit compatibility evaluation in the Mercury spacecraft mock-up was performed in suits submitted by the David Clark Company, B. F. Goodrich Company, and International Latex Company. Four subjects participated in the tests.

== July 2, 1959 (Thursday) ==
- The Lushan Conference opened, with members of the Politburo and the Central Committee of the Chinese Communist Party discussing the failure of the Great Leap Forward, an economic program instituted by Mao Zedong. When members of the committee drafted a letter to the chairman, a purge followed against so-called "right-wing deviation."
- Crown Prince Albert (later Albert II of Belgium) married Princess Paola Ruffo di Calabria. Albert succeeded his brother Baudouin of Belgium as King of Belgium in 1993.
- A fire at the Pentagon destroyed $30 million worth of computers in the Air Force Statistical Center and forced the evacuation of 30,000 employees. 25 firemen required medical treatment.

== July 3, 1959 (Friday) ==
- For the first time, a Wimbledon champion came from South America, as Alex Olmedo a United States citizen from Peru won the men's singles title, beating Australia's Rod Laver 6–1, 6–3 and 6–4. The next day, Maria Bueno of Brazil completed the South American sweep and ended a 21-year streak of U.S. titles, defeating American Darlene Hard, 6–4, 6–3, to win the women's singles.
- Born: Julie Burchill, British journalist and novelist; in Frenchay

== July 4, 1959 (Saturday) ==
- The Cayman Islands became a Crown colony of the British Empire.
- The Cumberland Gap National Historical Park, a U.S. park located in portions of the states of Kentucky, Tennessee and Virginia, was dedicated.

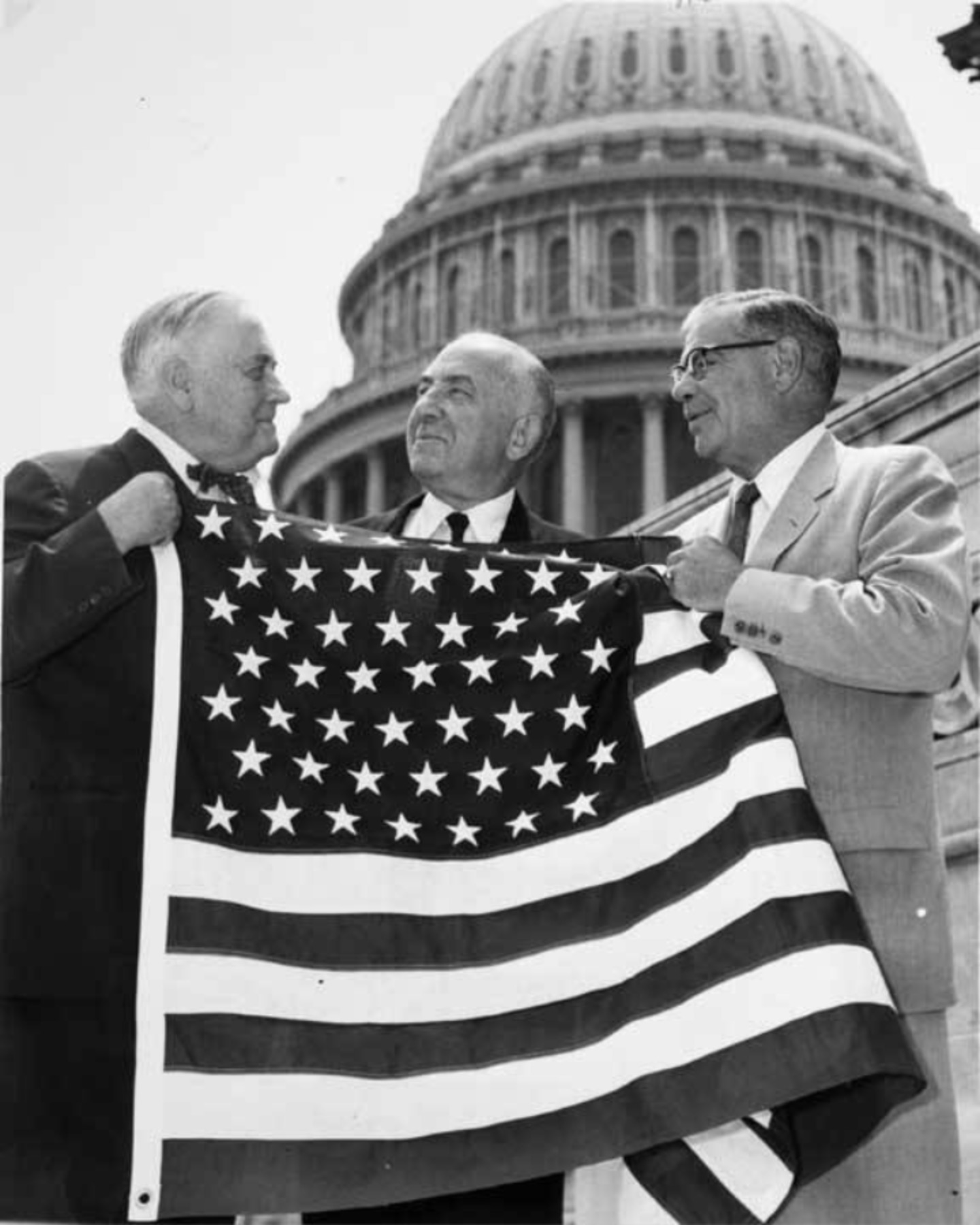
Alaska's first two U.S. Senators, Ernest Gruening (left) and Bob Bartlett (right), holding the 49-star U.S. flag

- The 49th star was added to the American flag on the first Fourth of July following Alaska's admission to the Union. Secretary of the Interior Fred Seaton raised the banner (seven stars in seven staggered rows) at 12:01 a.m over Fort McHenry in Baltimore, where Francis Scott Key wrote about the Star Spangled Banner.

== July 5, 1959 (Sunday) ==
- President Sukarno of Indonesia dissolved the Konstituante parliament and introduced a totalitarian system, which he called "Guided Democracy" (Demokrasi Terpimpin), with the assistance of General Abdul Haris Nasution.
- David Ben-Gurion resigned as Prime Minister of Israel and new elections were called for the Knesset. Ben-Gurion's Israel Workers' Party would win a majority of seats in the November election.
- German jurisdiction over Saarland, and its one million residents, became effective at 12:01 am after a period of transition that had begun on January 1, 1957. France had administered the region since the end of World War II, and Saarlanders were given five days to exchange 117 francs for each deutschmark.

== July 6, 1959 (Monday) ==
- A C-124 Globemaster cargo plane, carrying nuclear weapons, crashed on takeoff from Barksdale Air Force Base in Louisiana. The crew of seven survived, and safety devices functioned properly, but one weapon was destroyed in the fire that followed.
- Born: Richard Dacoury, French National Team basketball player

== July 7, 1959 (Tuesday) ==
- Venus passed between Earth and the star Regulus at 1428 GMT, providing astronomers an opportunity to learn more about the second planet. Because the starlight dimmed measurably as it passed through the Venusian atmosphere during the occultation, the density of that atmosphere could be calculated more precisely. The next conjunction of Venus and Regulus will take place on October 1, 2044.
- Bulgaria, Romania and the Soviet Union signed the "Convention Concerning Fishing in the Black Sea" at Varna, Bulgaria's Black Sea resort.
- The National League All-Stars defeated the American League All-Stars 5–4 at Pittsburgh's Forbes Field in the first of two Major League Baseball All-Star games. Because of an offseason vote by the MLB owners, an unprecedented second All-Star game would be played on August 3.

== July 8, 1959 (Wednesday) ==
- A Viet Cong attack on the divisional headquarters at Biên Hòa killed United States Army Major Dale R. Buis and Master Sergeant Chester M. Ovnand, formerly listed as the first two of 57,939 Americans to die in the Vietnam War. They were two of the 700 American military advisors sent to South Vietnam and had been watching a movie with six other advisors when the attack began. Four were wounded. Buis's name is the first on the Vietnam Veterans Memorial. Richard Vandegeer, one of 18 Americans killed on May 15, 1975, in the Mayaguez incident, is the last.
- An explosion on a tour boat in Haderslev, Denmark, killed 44 people.
- Born: Pauline Quirke, British comedian and actress known for her portrayal of Sharon Theodopolopodous as the star of the British TV sitcom Birds of a Feather; in Hackney, London

== July 9, 1959 (Thursday) ==
- After a 16-month break, the United States secretly resumed U-2 spy plane flights over the Soviet Union. Pilot Marty Knutson flew into Soviet airspace to photograph the missile site at Tyuratam. Ironically, the same day marked the signing of an exchange agreement between the United States National Academy of Sciences and the Academy of Sciences of the U.S.S.R.
- Al Sharpton preached his first sermon, at the age of four, at the Washington Temple Church of God in Christ in the Bedford-Stuyvesant section of Brooklyn.
- Born:
  - Jim Kerr, Scottish rock singer (Simple Minds), in Toryglen
  - Kevin Nash, American professional wrestler, WCW and WWF, in Trenton, Michigan
  - D. H. Peligro, American drummer, as Darell Henley in St. Louis, Missouri (d. 2022)
  - Clive Stafford Smith, British civil liberties attorney, in Cambridge

== July 10, 1959 (Friday) ==
- A memorial for Frank Foley (1884–1958) was dedicated in Harel, Israel, in the form of a forest planted in the desert. As a passport control officer at Britain's embassy in Nazi Germany, Foley flouted strict rules in order to help as many as 10,000 German Jews to leave the country.
- The Hate That Hate Produced, a TV documentary by Mike Wallace and Louis Lomax, was first broadcast. Intended as an exposé of the Black Muslim movement, the show instead gave national celebrity to Malcolm X and Wallace Muhammad. Prior to the program, the Black Muslim sect had 30,000 members, and within a few weeks the number had doubled.
- E. C. Braley and Laurence K. Loftin Jr., sponsored a conference at Langley Research Center to focus study at the center on placing a space station with a crew into Earth orbit. Braley, Loftin, and others envisioned a space station to serve the purpose of studying physical and psychological reactions of humans in the space environment for extended time, and their capabilities and usefulness during such missions; studying materials, structures, and control systems for extended-duration space vehicles, and means for communication, orbit control, and rendezvous in space; and evaluating techniques for terrestrial and astronomical observation and how a human crew could enhance those techniques in space. Participants saw the study as the first step toward landing humans on the Moon between 1969 and 1974.

== July 11, 1959 (Saturday) ==
- The Japanese government implemented a policy of publishing documents with a combination of 881 approved kanji symbols and the katakana syllabary.
- The crew of a Pan Am flight from Honolulu to San Francisco encountered a UFO at 21,000 feet (6,400 m) over the Pacific, and the sighting was confirmed by pilots on two other airlines. Captain George Wilson told reporters, "There was an extremely bright light surrounded by small lights", and that the object traveled at "inconceivable" speed, and added, "I'm a believer now."
- Born:
  - Richie Sambora, guitarist in Bon Jovi, in Perth Amboy, New Jersey
  - Suzanne Vega, American singer-songwriter, in Santa Monica, California
- Died: Charlie Parker, 76, English cricketer

== July 12, 1959 (Sunday) ==
- More than 100 people were killed during a 15-hour-long rebellion in the Honduran capital of Tegucigalpa. Members of the National Police seized the town of Comayagua and captured several locations in the capital but failed to get control of the residence of President of Honduras Ramon Villeda Morales.

== July 13, 1959 (Monday) ==
- One of the most notable nuclear accidents in American history happened at the Santa Susana Field Laboratory in southern California. The Sodium Reactor Experiment, which used liquid sodium to cool the uranium fuel rods and the nuclear reactor, experienced a sudden rise in temperature and radiation. Technicians managed to shut down the reactor, and after a two-hour inspection, the reactor was restarted. On July 26, a second inspection determined that 13 of the 43 fuel rods had melted. For two weeks, radioactive by-products had been released into the surrounding area.
- The planet Neptune reached its aphelion, the point in its 165-year orbit furthest from the Sun. The planet was at its closest on August 28, 1876, and will be again on September 5, 2042.
- Western Electric Company and associates were announced as winner of the competition for construction of the Mercury tracking network.
- Born: Richard Leman, British field hockey player and Olympic champion; in East Grinstead, West Sussex

== July 14, 1959 (Tuesday) ==
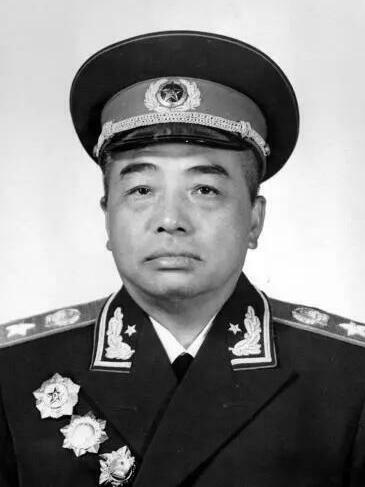
Ex-Defense Minister Peng

- Marshal Peng Dehuai, China's Minister of Defense, handed Chairman Mao Zedong a letter summarizing problems with the Great Leap Forward. Mao was furious, and two days later printed copies of the letter to distribute to the Luzhang Conference participants. Peng was fired and soon became the focus of the "Anti-Right Deviation Movement".
- In Kirkuk, Iraq, a rally to celebrate the first anniversary of the 1958 revolution degenerated into a three-day-long massacre of ethnic Turks by the Kurds. At least 30 people were killed, and over 100 injured. The event was later referred to as the Kirkuk Massacre. On the same day, Iraq became the first Arab nation to appoint a woman to a ministerial post, with Dr. Naziha ad-Dulaimi becoming Minister of Rural Affairs.
- The first nuclear warship, the USS Long Beach, was launched from Quincy, Massachusetts.
- The French Community, France's version of the British Commonwealth of Nations, was organized in Paris.
- Born: Susana Martínez, American politician and Governor of New Mexico from 2011 to 2019; in El Paso, Texas

== July 15, 1959 (Wednesday) ==
- More than 500,000 steelworkers walked off the job as the United Steelworkers of America called the largest strike in American history. Only after intervention by the President and the Supreme Court did the strike end, 116 days later, on November 6.
- Died: Ernest Bloch, 78, classical music composer

== July 16, 1959 (Thursday) ==
- Seconds after liftoff, a Juno II rocket, and the satellite it was carrying, were destroyed by ground control when the rocket veered off course toward central Florida.
- One of the largest solar flares of the 20th century was observed.
- Born: Gary Anderson, NFL kicker, in Parys, South Africa

== July 17, 1959 (Friday) ==
- Sixty-eight people, 51 of whom were children under the age of 10, were killed in South Korea when a sudden downpour and rapidly rising waters caused a panic and a stampede at the Busan Municipal Stadium, where an art show was being staged before a crowd of 70,000 people. The sudden storm came in conjunction with Typhoon Billie, the first typhoon officially monitored by meteorologists at the Joint Typhoon Warning Center.
- Anthropologist Mary Leakey unearthed a skull fragment, commonly referred to as Zinjanthropus, that would lead to a rethinking of the origins of human beings. Discovered at the Olduvai Gorge in Tanzania, where Louis Leakey had found prehistoric tools 28 years earlier. Zinjanthropus (now Australopithecus boisei) is not considered a direct human ancestor, but another Olduvai discovery from 1960, the mandible with teeth of "OH 5" (Olduvai Hominid 5), the toolmaking Homo habilis, some 1.75 million years old, is believed to be.
- New York TV station WPIX made an early experiment in instant replay, after a hit by Jim McAnany of the White Sox ended a no-hitter by the Yankees' Ralph Terry. Since the game was being videotaped, broadcaster Mel Allen asked director Terry Murphy to play a tape of McAnany's hit over the air soon afterward.

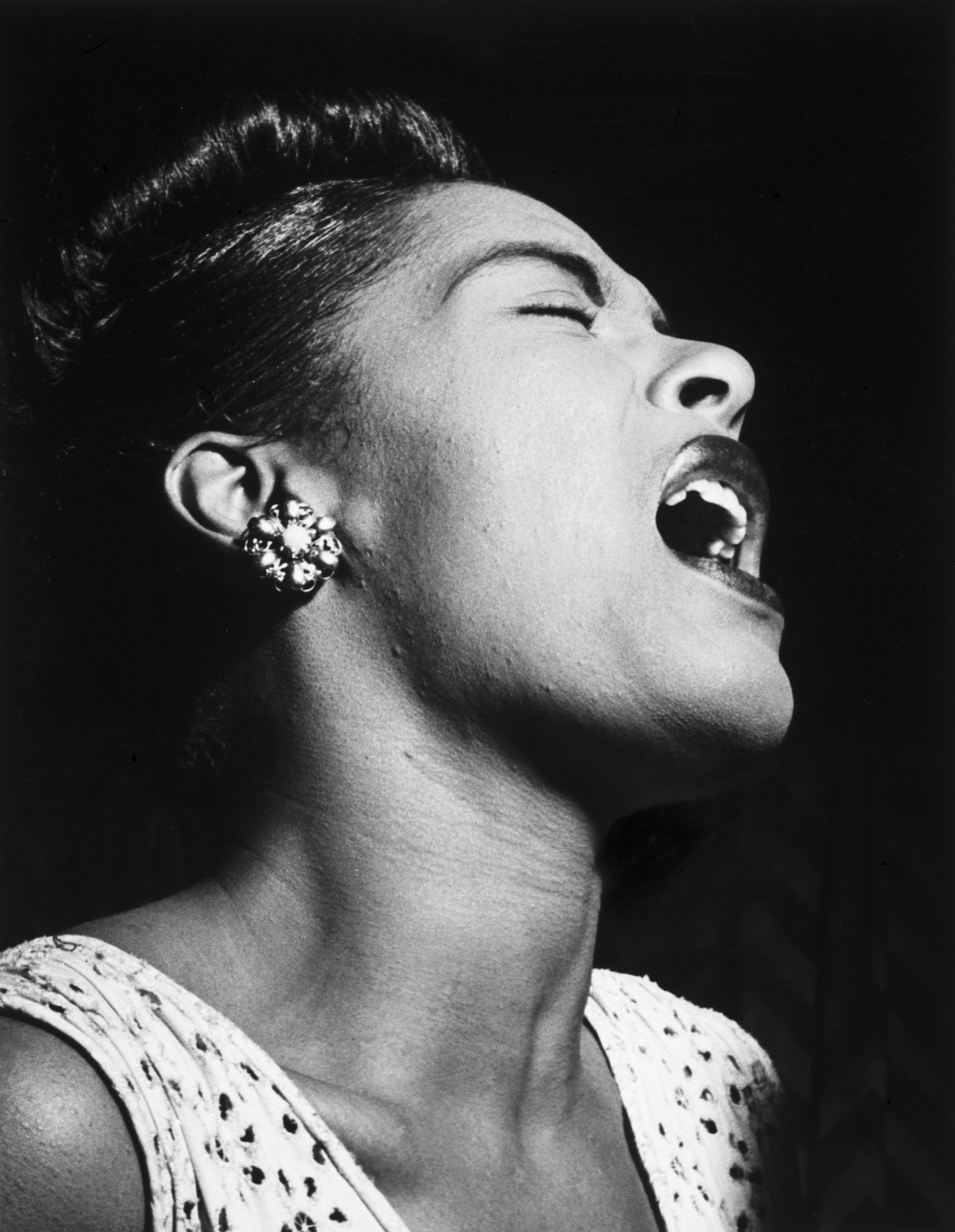
Billie Holiday

- Alfred Hitchcock's North by Northwest, with Cary Grant, premiered.
- Died: Singer Billie Holiday, 44, died at 3:20 a.m. at New York's Metropolitan Hospital, where she had been admitted on May 31 for heart failure. Thousands of mourners turned out for her wake and her funeral.

== July 18, 1959 (Saturday) ==
- Osvaldo Dorticós Torrado was sworn in as President of Cuba shortly after midnight, hours after Fidel Castro went on television to denounce President Manuel Urrutia. On July 17, Castro had announced his resignation as Prime Minister and his plans to address the nation at 7:00 p.m. Urrutia, who had disagreed with Castro's confiscation of private farmland, resigned three hours into Castro's speech and made plans to flee the country.
- Bill Wright won the U.S. Amateur Public Links near Denver, Colorado, becoming the first African-American golfer to win a championship tournament run by the United States Golf Association (USGA).

== July 19, 1959 (Sunday) ==
- At a meeting in Saniquellie, Liberia, Presidents William Tubman of Liberia and Sekou Toure of Ghana, and Prime Minister Kwame Nkrumah of Ghana, came to an agreement that led to the founding, in 1963, of the Organisation of African Unity (OAU).

== July 20, 1959 (Monday) ==
- Soviet Premier Nikita Khrushchev called off a tour of Sweden, Norway and Denmark. The Scandinavian visit had been slated to start on August 15 with a visit to Stockholm, but was criticized by newspapers in all three countries.
- Negotiations for construction of the Mercury tracking network were started with the Western Electric Company and their subcontractors (Bendix Aviation, IBM, Bell Telephone Laboratories, and Burns and Roe). A letter contract was signed on July 30, 1959, for the entire range that included radar tracking, telemetry receiving, recording, and display, communications to spacecraft and surface stations; and computing and control facilities.
- New York City's popular Four Seasons Restaurant began 60 years of service, opening at the Seagram Building at 99 East 52nd Street in Manhattan.

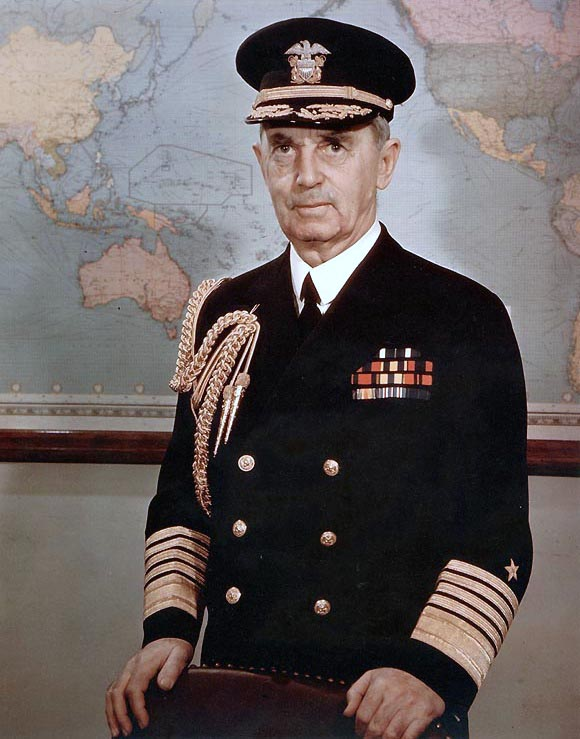
Admiral Leahy

- Died: Fleet Admiral William D. Leahy, 84, highest ranking American naval officer during World War II

== July 21, 1959 (Tuesday) ==
- Two milestones in the erosion of censorship happened on opposite sides of the Atlantic Ocean. In the United States, federal judge Frederick van Pelt Bryan enjoined the U.S. Postmaster General from stopping the delivery of the novel Lady Chatterley's Lover, while in Britain, the Obscene Publications Act 1959 was passed, marking what John Sutherland would describe as "the great liberation for printed literature".
- The Boston Red Sox became the last Major League Baseball team to integrate, twelve years after Jackie Robinson had broken the color line. In the eighth inning of a game at Chicago, Pumpsie Green entered the lineup as a pinch runner, then played the ninth inning as a shortstop in a 2–1 win over the White Sox. Green was called up from the Minneapolis Millers club after Bobby Ávila was traded to the Braves.
- Alterations to Building "S" at Cape Canaveral for Project Mercury support were discussed in a meeting at Cape Canaveral. A target date of December 1, 1959, was set for project completion. Project Vanguard activities would have to be phased out of the building.

== July 22, 1959 (Wednesday) ==
- The Japan–Paraguay Immigration Agreement was signed, providing for 85,000 Japanese citizens to immigrate to Paraguay over a 30-year period, settling on farmland purchased by Japan's government in Chavez, Fram, Alton Parana and Iguacu. In consideration for the agreement, Japan made a $3.8 million loan so that the Paraguayan Navy could purchase seven war ships. The plan failed, with fewer than 7,754 Japanese moving to Paraguay.
- B. F. Goodrich Company was selected to design and develop the Mercury astronaut pressure suit. In 1934, Goodrich had developed the first rubber stratosphere flying suit for attempts at setting altitude records.
- A successful pad abort flight was made of a boilerplate Mercury spacecraft with a production version of the escape tower and rocket. The escape rocket motor was manufactured by Grand Central Rocket Company, and the flight was the first operational test of the escape rocket.
- The Space Task Group, McDonnell, and the Air Force Chart and Information Center met to design a map to depict a Mercury spacecraft flight. The chart would cover an area of 40 degrees latitude above and below the equator and show oceans and continents by colors to match probable visual characteristics. Orbit numbers and time since launch would be depicted and traced.
- The U.S. Navy provided NASA with a list of reserve ships to direct support of Project Mercury. A little more than a year later, on July 28, 1959, specific information on the ships would be forwarded to NASA.

== July 23, 1959 (Thursday) ==
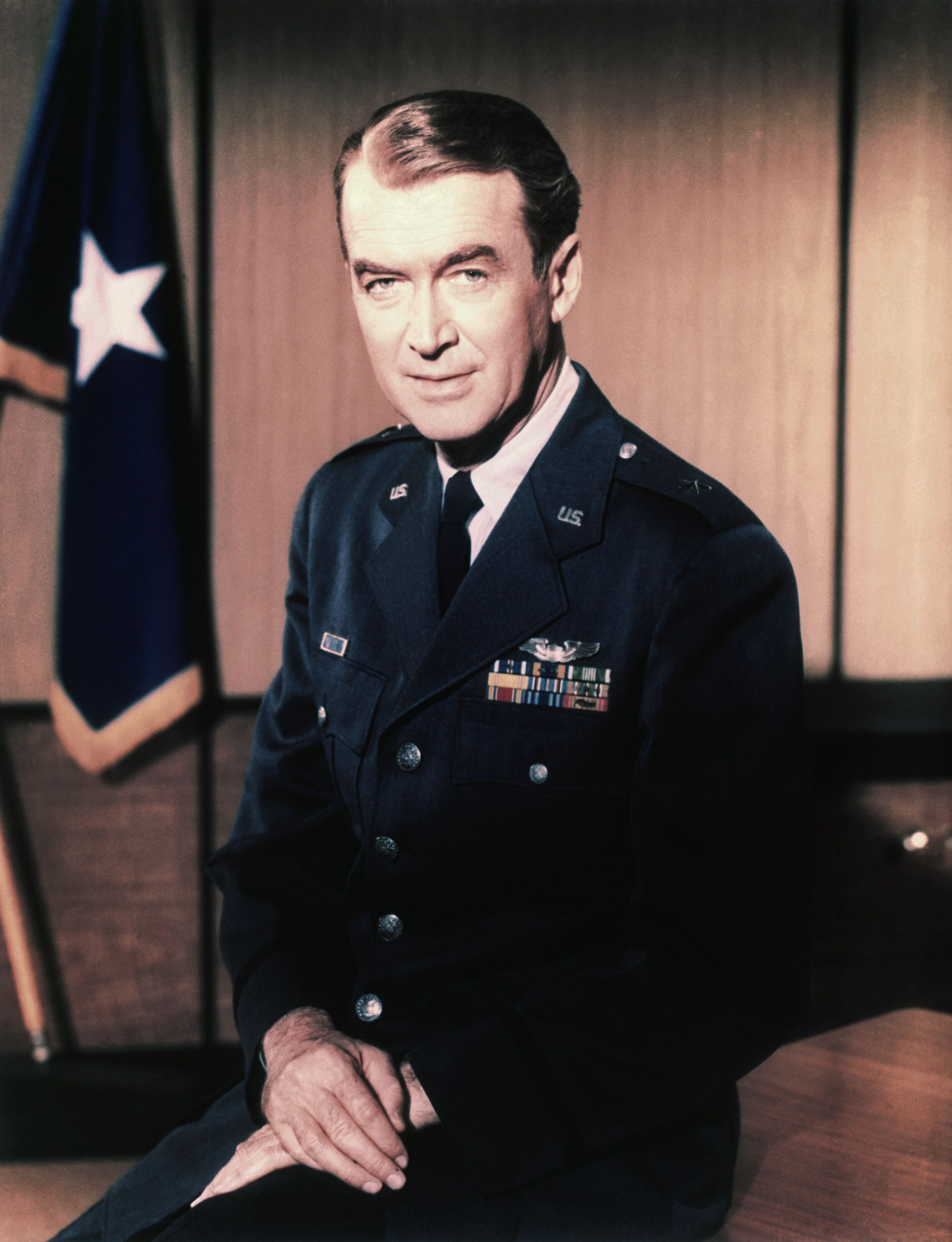
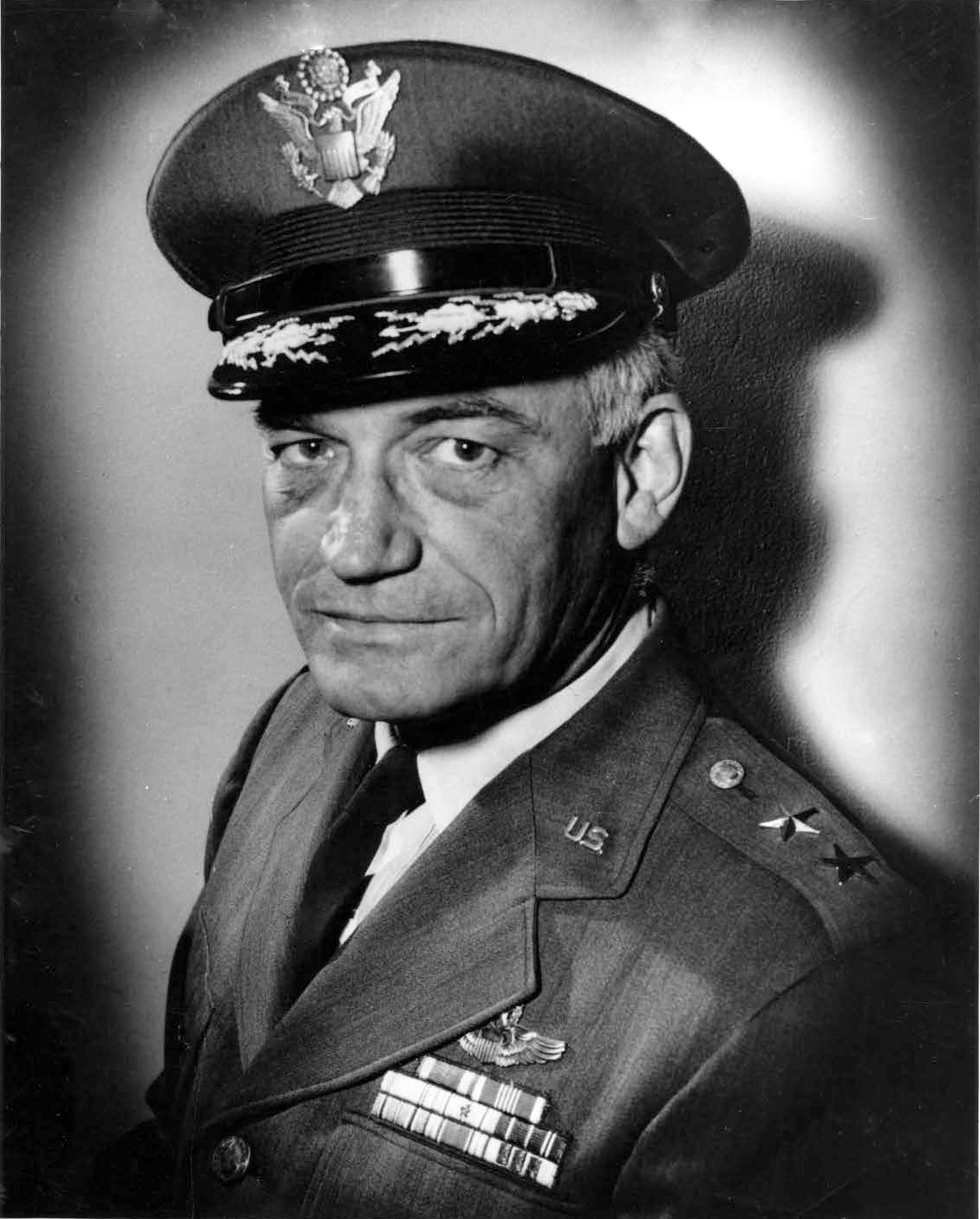
Brigadier Generals Stewart and Goldwater
- Actor Jimmy Stewart and U.S. Senator Barry Goldwater both won promotion to the rank of brigadier general. In addition to their civilian jobs, both were colonels in the U.S. Air Force reserves. The promotions were approved by voice vote in the Senate.
- The September–October issue of the DC Comic Showcase, No. 22 in the series, went on sale, and introduced Hal Jordan as the "Silver Age" Green Lantern.

== July 24, 1959 (Friday) ==
- The Kitchen Debate took place between Soviet Premier Nikita Khrushchev and American Vice-president Richard Nixon, at Moscow's Sokolniki Park, where the American National Exhibition was being held. At a display of a model kitchen, Khrushchev and Nixon argued, through interpreters, over the merits of communism and capitalism. Both recounted the incident years later, in Six Crises by Nixon, and in Khrushchev Remembers. Time magazine would later describe the first public discussion between the Soviet and American officials as "what may be remembered as peacetime diplomacy's most amazing 24 hours".
- Died: King Mutara III Rudahigwa, ruler of the Tutsi people in the Belgian colony of Rwanda, collapsed and died after being given a penicillin injection by a Belgian physician in Bujumbura. The death was believed by other doctors to be from anaphylactic shock from a penicillin allergy, although other histories refer to the death as an assassination. In the violence that followed, 20,000 Tutsi were killed and 150,000 fled the country over the next seven years.

== July 25, 1959 (Saturday) ==
- On the 50th anniversary of the first airplane flight across the English Channel (by Louis Bleriot), the first hovercraft trip across the Channel took place, as the SR.N1 made the journey on a cushion of air.
- The videotapes of the Kitchen Debate were broadcast on American television, after a delay occasioned by the Soviet government's request to have 20 minutes of the Nixon-Khrushchev exchange shown in both nations simultaneously. Because the Soviet television equipment would not accommodate American videorecording, the tape was not broadcast there.

== July 26, 1959 (Sunday) ==
- Eight days after his "resignation", Fidel Castro rallied half a million peasants and announced that he would return as Prime Minister. President Urrutia fled Cuba, disguised as a milkman, and was replaced by Osvaldo Dorticós Torrado, while Castro built a cult of personality and a dictatorship.
- Born:
  - Rick Bragg, American journalist and author, in Piedmont, Alabama
  - Kevin Spacey, American actor and director, Oscar winner 1995 and 1999, in South Orange, New Jersey

== July 27, 1959 (Monday) ==
- A proposed third major league for baseball—the Continental League—was announced at New York's Biltmore Hotel. Like the National League and the American League, the CL would have eight teams. Backed by William Shea and Branch Rickey, the league announced the first five teams in—New York, Houston, Toronto, Denver, and Minneapolis-St. Paul. New York Mayor Robert F. Wagner had declared it "Continental League Baseball Day". The CL planned to play a 154-game schedule starting in 1961.
- Admiral Hyman Rickover inspected the first nuclear powered Soviet ship, the icebreaker Lenin.
- Born: Hugh Green, college and NFL linebacker; in Natchez, Mississippi

== July 28, 1959 (Tuesday) ==
- Lt. Col. William H. Rankin bailed out of his crippled F-8 fighter after it stalled at 47,000 feet (14,000 m). After a two-minute freefall, his parachute opened automatically at 10,000 feet (3,000 m), but it took him another 38 minutes to reach the ground. Rankin descended into a thunderstorm and was buffeted up and down by the winds until landing near Ahoskie, North Carolina. He told his story to the Associated Press from his hospital bed more than a week later.
- Voters in Hawaii elected their first state governor (William F. Quinn), their first Congressman (Daniel K. Inouye), and their first United States Senators, Hiram L. Fong and Oren E. Long.
- A boilerplate Mercury spacecraft, instrumented to measure sound pressure level and vibration, was launched in the second beach abort test leading to the Little Joe test series. The instrumentation was set to measure the vibration and sound environment on the capsule during firing of the abort rocket.

== July 29, 1959 (Wednesday) ==
- After passing both houses of Parliament, the Legitimacy Act of 1959, giving equal rights to children born out of wedlock, received royal assent in Britain.
- Australia entered the "Jet Age", when Qantas became the first airline outside the United States to inaugurate Boeing 707 services, flying from Sydney, Australia, to San Francisco.
- Born: Sanjay Dutt, award-winning Bollywood actor and politician, in Bombay (now Mumbai)

== July 30, 1959 (Thursday) ==
- Robert Noyce of the Fairchild Semiconductor company filed a patent application for his invention of an integrated circuit that could be mass-produced. On April 25, 1961, he would receive U.S. Patent 2,981,877 and, along with Jack Kilby who had applied for a patent for the original IC five months earlier, would receive the Nobel Prize in Physics in 2000.
- The United Nations Medal was established for service, and is awarded for at least six months service with UN forces. The medal can be awarded to American servicemen as of 1964.
- Died:
  - Cho Bong-am, 60, who had been South Korea's Minister of Agriculture in 1948, and had run for president in 1956, was executed for "treason against the state".
  - María Natividad Venegas de la Torre, 91, Mexican nun who was canonized as a Roman Catholic saint in 2000

== July 31, 1959 (Friday) ==
- Article 356 of the Constitution of India was invoked, providing for President's Rule of an Indian state, to depose the Communist government of the State of Kerala.
- Euzkadi Ta Askatasuna (ETA), the Basque separatist organization, was founded in Spain. In its first 40 years, ETA's paramilitary attacks killed more than 800 people and wounded thousands.
- NASA's Aeromedical Field Laboratory inspected the first "animal couch" to be used in the Mercury animal flight program. The animal program was to meant to perfect space flight before humans could go into space missions, and to gather data on physical and mental demands which might be encountered by the astronauts in flight. The animal program would also test procedures and training for support personnel for the aeromedical program for human flight, and evaluate spacecraft environmental control systems and bioinstrumentation under flight conditions.
