= August 1959 =

Month of 1959

<<	August 1959					>>
Su	Mo	Tu	We	Th	Fr	Sa
						1
2	3	4	5	6	7	8
9	10	11	12	13	14	15
16	17	18	19	20	21	22
23	24	25	26	27	28	29
30	31

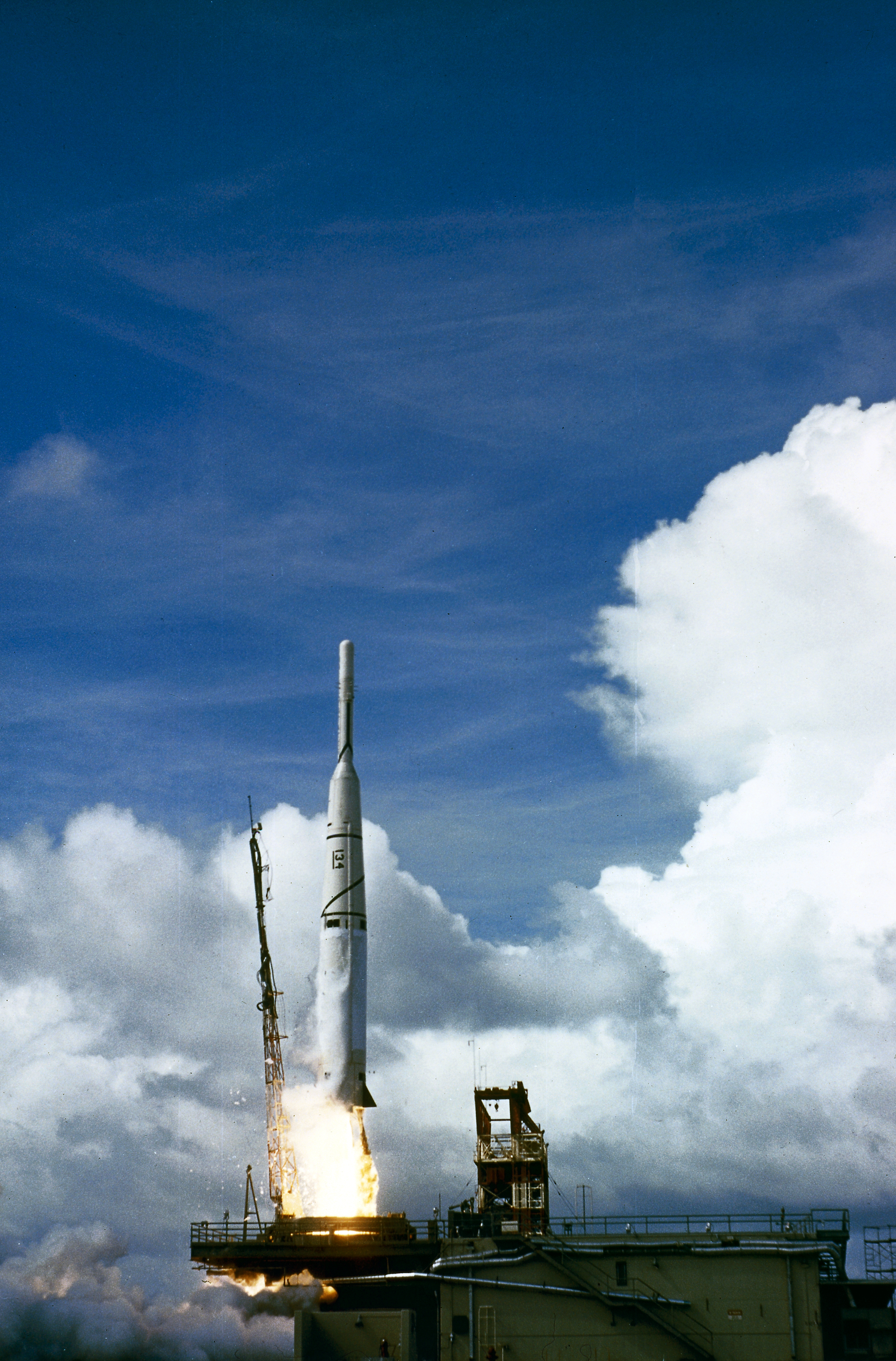
August 14, 1959: Explorer 6 returns first photo of the Earth from orbit

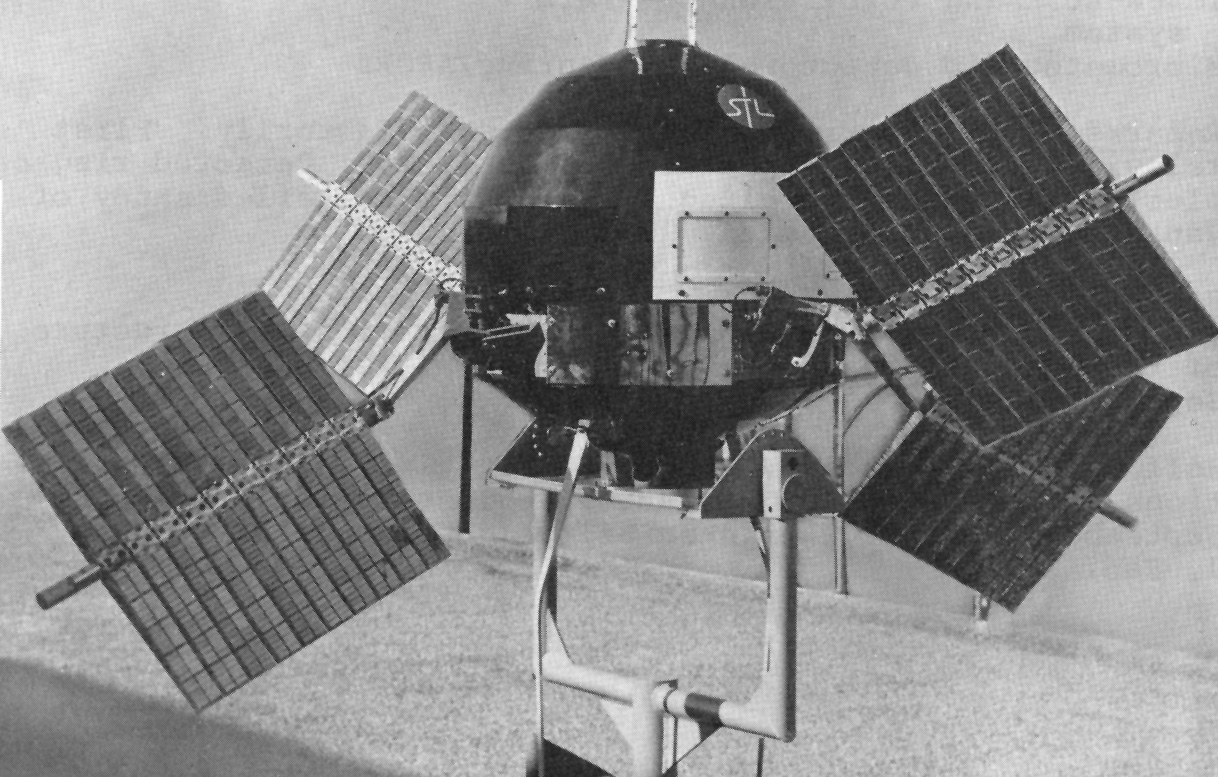
Explorer 6, orbiting TV camera

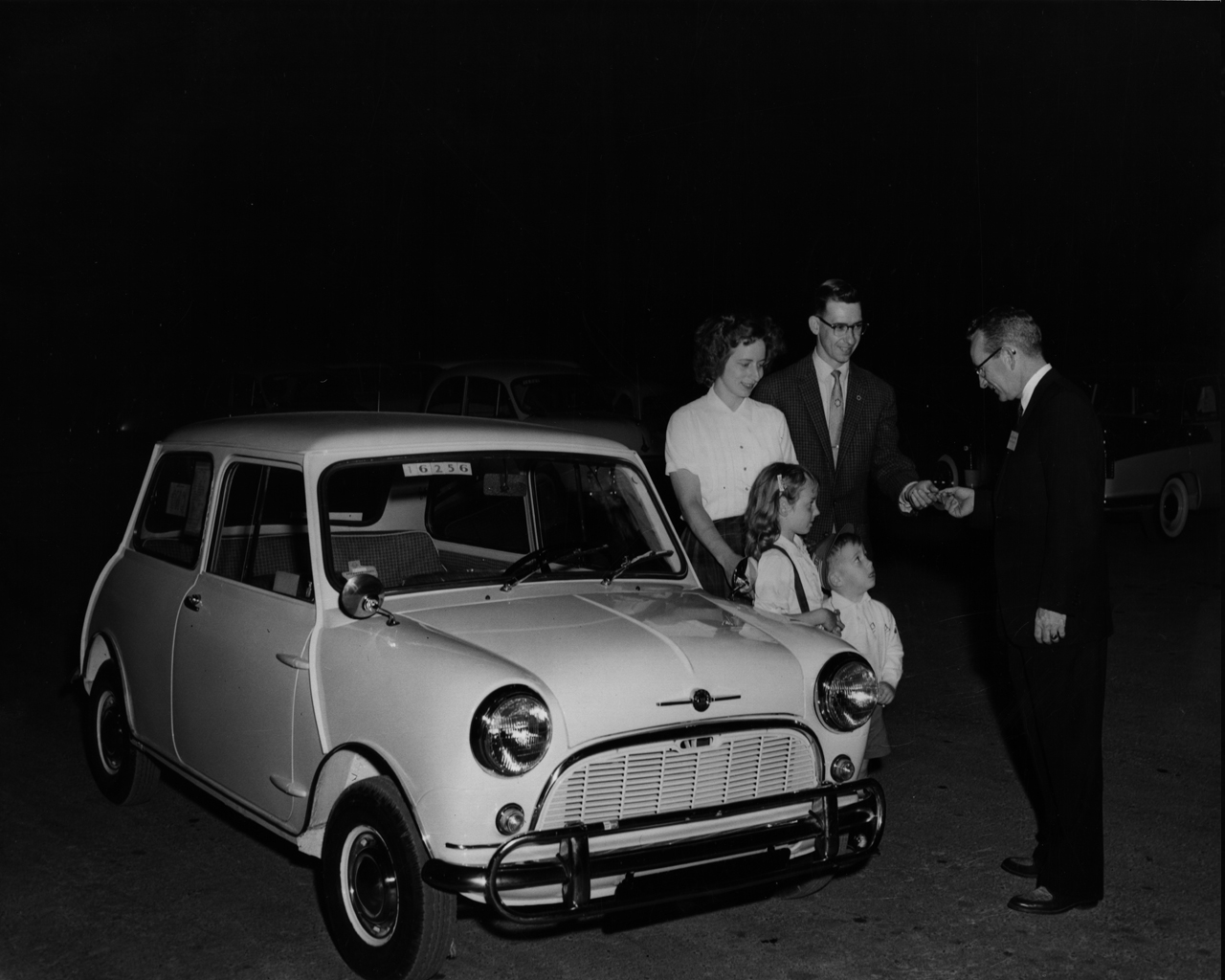
August 27, 1959: The Mini Cooper is introduced

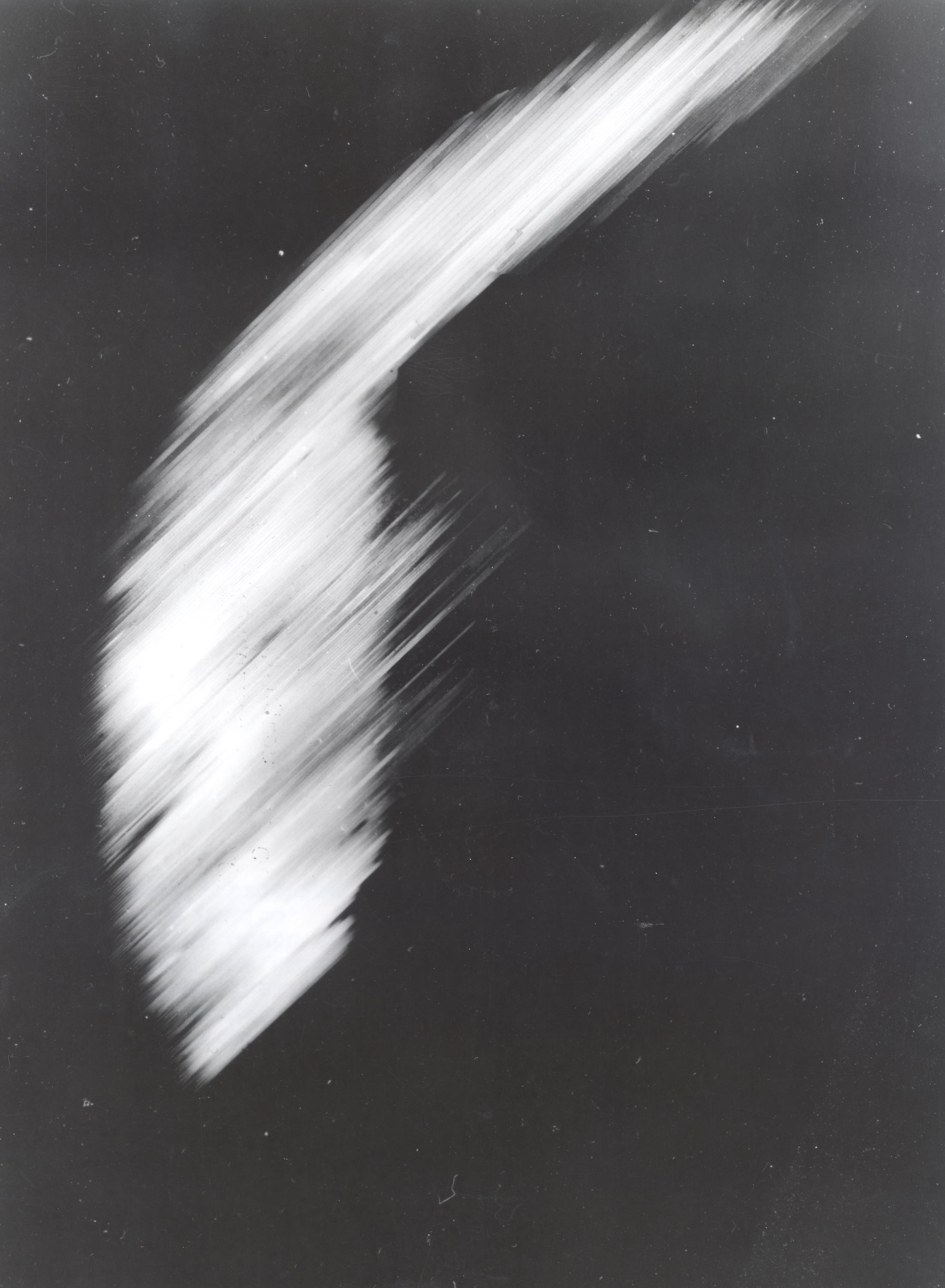
The first satellite photo of the Earth

The following events occurred in August 1959:

== August 1, 1959 (Saturday) ==
- Georges Vanier was asked to serve as Governor General of Canada, the first French Canadian, and only the second Canadian native overall, to hold the job. He took office on September 15 and served until his death in 1967.
- John Gotti, 18, was arrested for the first time, in a raid on a New York gambling establishment.
- Born: Joe Elliott, British rock singer (Def Leppard), in Sheffield

== August 2, 1959 (Sunday) ==
- Rioting broke out in Temirtau, a Virgin Lands Campaign city being built in the Kazakh S.S.R. Before Soviet authorities restored order, 16 rioters were killed, and 109 soldiers and policemen were injured.

== August 3, 1959 (Monday) ==
- Portuguese soldiers and civilian police fired on a crowd of strikers at a dock in Pijiguiti, Portuguese Guinea, killing as many 50 and wounding 100. The massacre was the start of a 13-year battle that culminated in the independence of the colony in 1974 as Guinea-Bissau.
- The Army's Combat Development Experimentation Center unveiled the "Soldier of Tomorrow", described in a press release as "America's ultimate weapon – the man." The soldier of 1965 would have "a helmet with a built-in radio, infra-red binoculars and his own rocket device", a "jump belt", which "will enable him to cross streams and cliffs with ease".
- Major General Donald N. Yates was appointed as the U.S. Department of Defense representative for Project Mercury support operations.
- Born: Koichi Tanaka, Japanese scientist, recipient of the 2002 Nobel Prize in Chemistry, in Toyama

== August 4, 1959 (Tuesday) ==
- U.S. Secretary of State Christian Herter presented a check to Carlos P. Romulo, President of the Philippines, for $23,862,751 for damages caused by the 1934 devaluation of Philippine currency, caused when the U.S. abandoned the gold standard. The U.S. agreed to pay $73 million for war damages, but rejected fifteen other claims totalling $950 million.
- Born: Robbin Crosby, American rock guitarist (Ratt), in La Jolla, California (d. 2002)

== August 5, 1959 (Wednesday) ==
- U.S. President Dwight D. Eisenhower approved a change in America's Basic National Security Policy, providing that "The United States will be prepared to use chemical and biological weapons to the extent that such use will enhance the effectiveness of the armed forces. The decisions as to their use will be made by the President."
- Three months of negotiations between the Soviet Union, and the United States, Great Britain and France, ended in Geneva with no resolution on the future of Berlin.
- Died: Edgar A. Guest, 77, English-born American poet for the Detroit Free Press who published 11,000 poems between 1898 and his death. At his height, he was syndicated in 300 newspapers and was dubbed "The People's Poet".

== August 6, 1959 (Thursday) ==
- Four F-102 aircraft were made available for use by the Mercury astronauts to maintain proficiency in high performance vehicles.
- The B-17 Flying Fortress was used in an American military operation for the last time. An unmanned radio-controlled drone was guided over the White Sands Missile Range and shot down by Falcon air-to-air missiles from F-101 and F-106 jets.
- Born: Donna Lewis, Welsh singer-songwriter, in Cardiff
- Died: Preston Sturges, 60, American film director and writer

== August 7, 1959 (Friday) ==
- In Taiwan, 1,075 people died in floods after Typhoon Ellen caused 1,164 mm (45 in) of rain to fall over three days.
- Six city blocks in downtown Roseburg, Oregon, were levelled at 1:20 a.m. by the explosion of a dynamite truck. The blast killed 14 people and left a 50-foot-wide (15 m) crater.
- The United Nations reported a deficit of $7,469,150. More than 60 member nations had not paid annual dues.
- Pakistan passed the Elective Bodies Disqualification Order, barring 75 leaders in East Pakistan from political activity until December 31, 1966.

== August 8, 1959 (Saturday) ==
- After more than 1,000 performances in the London production of My Fair Lady, Julie Andrews retired from the role of Eliza Doolittle, freeing her to go on to a career in film and television. She was replaced in the role by Anne Rogers.
- A fatal car accident ignited a wildfire in the Decker Canyon near Lake Elsinore, California. The ensuing blaze killed six firefighters.
- Died: Albert Namatjira, 57, Australian aboriginal artist and activist. Namatjira was the first Northern Territory aboriginal person to be granted Australian citizenship and the right to vote in national elections.

== August 9, 1959 (Sunday) ==
- The SM-65 Atlas, America's first intercontinental ballistic missile (ICBM), with a range of 4,350 kilometers (2,700 mi), was declared to be operational after successful testing.
- Born: Kurtis Blow, American rap artist (as Curtis Walker), in New York City

== August 10, 1959 (Monday) ==
- Four of the five singers for The Platters, who had hit No. 1 earlier in the year with "Smoke Gets in Your Eyes", were arrested in Cincinnati and charged with soliciting prostitutes and using drugs. The charges were eventually dismissed, but the group's concert dates were cancelled, and disc jockeys refused to play their records, for several months.
- Born: Rosanna Arquette, American actress, in New York City

== August 11, 1959 (Tuesday) ==
- Sheremetyevo International Airport opened at the site of the former Sheremetyevsky Air Base near Moscow as the second civilian airport to serve the Russian capital, in order to supplement the smaller Vnukovo International Airport. Initially limited to domestic traffic, its first civilian flight was the arrival of an Aeroflot Tupolev Tu-104B jet flight from Leningrad, and it would begin international flights on June 1, 1960, and it is now the busiest airport in Russia.
- The longest home run of all time was hit in a minor league baseball game in Carlsbad, New Mexico. Gil Carter literally knocked the ball out of the park, clearing the left field light tower at Montgomery Field. His team, the Carlsbad Potashers, lost to the Odessa (Texas) Dodgers, 6–2, in the Sophomore League (Class D) game. The ball was found the next day, 733 feet (223 m) from home plate.
- Born:
  - Gustavo Cerati, Argentinian rock musician (Soda Stereo), in Buenos Aires (d. 2014)
  - Yoshiaki Murakami, Japanese corporate raider, in Osaka

== August 12, 1959 (Wednesday) ==
- In the U.S., high schools in Little Rock, Arkansas, reopened, a year after being closed in order to avoid integration. Governor Orval E. Faubus addressed a crowd of 1,000 segregationists in front of the State Capitol while the two schools, each admitting three black students, were beginning classes. Afterward, a group of 200 protestors outside of Central High School were dispersed by the city police.
- The New Projects Panel of Space Task Group (STG) met for the first time, with H. Kurt Strass in the chair. The panel considered problems related to atmospheric reentry at speeds approaching escape velocity, maneuvers in the atmosphere and space, and parachute recovery for an Earth landing. Alan B. Kehlet of STG's Flight Systems Division was assigned to oversee the overhauling of a second-generation capsule to incorporate several advances over the Mercury spacecraft. A goal was set for a capsule to carry three astronauts (which would eventually be realized in 1968 by Apollo 7), capable of maneuvering in space and in the atmosphere. The primary reentry system would be designed for water landing, with land landing as a secondary goal.
- The city of Crosslake, Minnesota, was incorporated.

== August 13, 1959 (Thursday) ==
- North Korea and Japan agreed on terms for repatriation of Koreans living in Japan. Over the next two years, thousands moved back to their homes in North Korea, even with an option to live in South Korea.
- The Philippines Department of Education declared that Pilipino, a standardized form of Tagalog, would replace English as the national language of instruction for grades 1 through 4.
- Born: Danny Bonaduce, American TV actor; in Broomall, Pennsylvania

== August 14, 1959 (Friday) ==
- Typhoon Georgia struck Japan, killing 137 people. Hitting Honshu Island, the typhoon caused the worst damage in history to Japan's rail lines.
- The formation of the American Football League was announced at a press conference in Chicago, with at least six teams to begin play in autumn 1960, in New York, Los Angeles, Houston, Dallas, Denver and Minneapolis. Founder Lamar Hunt would later say that he had envisioned the AFL as being a six-team league in its inaugural season, but that interest from Ralph Wilson and others led to an 8-team circuit.
- Earth was photographed for the first time from an orbiting satellite, Explorer 6, which had been launched on August 7. The first image, taken from an altitude of about 27,000 km or 17,000 miles, showed the clouds over the northern Pacific Ocean. Although the photo was crude, it demonstrated the potential of observing weather patterns from orbit.
- NASA Headquarters approved a Space Task Group proposal that negotiations be undertaken with McDonnell for the fabrication of six additional Mercury spacecraft.
- The Federal Radiation Council was created by Executive Order 10831. Consisting of six cabinet members and the Chairman of the Atomic Energy Commission, the council was established to advise the American President on federal standards for radiation and nuclear plant safety.
- Born: Magic Johnson (Earvin Johnson, Jr.), American NBA player; in Lansing, Michigan

== August 15, 1959 (Saturday) ==
- The first fatal crash of a passenger jet killed five American Airlines crewmen, who were on a training flight of a Boeing 707. The crew were practicing landings at a private airfield owned by Grumman Aircraft when the jet crashed in a potato field at Calverton, New York, at 4:40 pm.
- The Mercury astronauts began their initial centrifuge training at the Aviation Medical Acceleration Laboratory.
- Born: Scott Altman, American astronaut on four space shuttle missions; in Lincoln, Illinois

== August 16, 1959 (Sunday) ==
- Television arrived in the Australian State of Queensland, as QTQ Channel 9 started broadcasting in Brisbane. TV had been operational in New South Wales (Sydney) and in Victoria (Melbourne) since 1956. On September 5, NWS would begin in South Australia (Adelaide) and TVW on October 16 in Western Australia (Perth).
- Died:
  - Fleet Admiral William Halsey, Jr., 76, who directed American naval operations in the South Pacific Ocean during World War II
  - Wanda Landowska, 80, Polish harpsichordist

== August 17, 1959 (Monday) ==
- Measuring 7.1 on the Richter scale, an earthquake struck the Madison River Canyon in Montana at 11:37 p.m., near Yellowstone National Park. Lasting 8 seconds, the tremor toppled 80 million tons of earth into the canyon, killing 28 people, and creating Quake Lake.
- The U.S. Chief of Naval Operations, Admiral Arleigh Burke, disclosed that the Soviet Union could fire submarine-launched ballistic missiles, based on observations made in May. At the time, the United States was still constructing its own Polaris missile subs. Burke added, "I don't know how many they have."
- Pope John XXIII was presented the third part of the "Three Secrets of Fatima" in a sealed envelope, but decided against reading it. Pope John Paul II would release the contents in 2000.
- Indonesia's President Sukarno outlined his political manifesto, which he called "Manipol-USDEK", a five-point plan (Undang-Undang Dasar 1945, Sosialisme a la Indonesia, Demokrasi Terpimpin, Ekonomi Terpimpin, Kepribadian Indonesia) stressing the 1945 Constitution, Indonesian socialism and Indonesian identity, guided democracy and guided economy.
- Born:
  - David Koresh, leader of the Branch Davidian cult (as Vernon Wayne Howell); in Houston (d. 1993)
  - Jonathan Franzen, American novelist known for The Corrections; in Webster Groves, Missouri
  - Eric Schlosser, American reporter, and author of Fast Food Nation in Manhattan

== August 18, 1959 (Tuesday) ==
- The Inter-American Commission on Human Rights was signed by 21 member states of the Organization of American States. The OAS's "Declaration of Santiago" came at the conclusion of the Fifth Meeting of Consultation of Ministers of Foreign Affairs, in Chile.
- Branch Rickey, 78, was introduced in a New York City press conference as the President of baseball's proposed Continental League. Afterwards, Rickey and co-founder William Shea met with the presidents of the American and National Leagues at Commissioner Frick's office.
- Sixty-two firemen were injured, six of them fatally, after the explosion of bulk storage tanks at the Continental Oil Company refinery in Kansas City, Kansas.

== August 19, 1959 (Wednesday) ==
- An elephant killed 20 people and injured hundreds others at Kandy in Ceylon (now Sri Lanka), where 200,000 were gathered at the Temple of the Tooth for the Esala Perahera ceremonies.
- The Baghdad Pact, which had been kicked out of Baghdad after Iraq withdrew from the alliance, changed its name to the CENTO, the Central Treaty Organization, with the United Kingdom, Turkey, Pakistan and Iran.
- Died:
  - Claude Grahame-White, 79, British aviation pioneer
  - Jacob Epstein, 78, American-born sculptor
  - Blind Willie McTell, 61, Piedmont Blues singer and guitarist

== August 20, 1959 (Thursday) ==
- More than 100 people drowned when the inter-island transport ship Pilar II capsized and sank off of the coast of Palawan Island in the Philippines.

== August 21, 1959 (Friday) ==
Flag of Hawaii

- Hawaii was proclaimed the 50th state of the United States of America. At 3:14 p.m. Washington time, 9:14 a.m. in Honolulu, President Dwight D. Eisenhower called William F. Quinn, who was then administered the oath as the first state governor. Quinn had been the last territorial governor, appointed by Eisenhower in 1957. Eisenhower then issued Executive Order 10834, prescribing the standards for the 50-star American flag.
- During the countdown of the first programmed Little Joe launching (LJ-1 beach abort test) at Wallops Island, the escape rocket fired prematurely 31 minutes before the scheduled launch. The spacecraft rose to an altitude of 2,000 feet (610 m) before landing about 2,000 feet (610 m) from the launch site. Premature firing was caused by a faulty escape circuit.
- Born: Jim McMahon, American NFL quarterback, in Jersey City, New Jersey

== August 22, 1959 (Saturday) ==
- Leonard Bernstein and the New York Philharmonic Orchestra played at the Moscow Conservatory for their first visit to the Soviet Union. The orchestra performed Shostakovich's Fifth Symphony in the presence of its composer, Dmitri Shostakovich. For Mozart's Concerto for Piano and Orchestra in G Major, Bernstein played the piano and conducted at the same time.

== August 23, 1959 (Sunday) ==
- Professional baseball was played at Brooklyn's Ebbets Field for the last time. A crowd of 4,000 turned out to watch a doubleheader featuring Negro league teams in an exhibition. In the first game, the Kansas City Monarchs beat the Brooklyn Stars 3–1. In the second, the Monarchs lost to the Havana Cubans, 6–4.

== August 24, 1959 (Monday) ==
- The United States Senate increased in size to 100 Senators, as Hiram L. Fong and Oren E. Long of Hawaii were administered the oath of office by Vice-President Richard M. Nixon. The United States House of Representatives had its largest number of members ever as Hawaii's Daniel K. Inouye was administered the oath of office by Speaker Sam Rayburn, bringing the number to 437. The number has been 435 since 1963.

== August 25, 1959 (Tuesday) ==
- Troops in India and China clashed for the first time in a border dispute. A squad of Indian troops at Longju fired across the "McMahon Line" at Chinese guards stationed at the Tibetan village of Migyitun.
- The wives and daughters of senior government officials in Afghanistan appeared in public without veils. After initial resistance by Islamic scholars, the controversy over the unveiling ceased within a month.
- Born: Sönke Wortmann, German film director; in Marl, North Rhine-Westphalia, West Germany

== August 26, 1959 (Wednesday) ==
- Dwight D. Eisenhower became the first President of the United States to fly in a jet airplane, as a new Boeing VC-137 (military counterpart to the Boeing 707) transported him to Bonn, West Germany, with a stop at Newfoundland for refueling. The presidential jet was nicknamed "Queenie"
- The original Mini, the Mark I Mini, was introduced by the British Motor Corporation as a small but roomy saloon (or sedan) which would be in production until the year 2000.

== August 27, 1959 (Thursday) ==
- The Bulgarian prison camp at Belene Island, in the Danube River, was closed permanently when the Politburo of the Bulgarian Communist Party ordered the release of 276 political prisoners. Another 166 "incorrigible recidivsts" were transferred to the newer Lovech camp. At one time, Belene Island held 4,500 detainees.
- The Polaris missile was successfully launched for the first time. Designed to be fired by a submarine from underwater, the Polaris was tested above the surface from the ship USNS Observation Island (T-AGM-23). The 28-foot-tall (8.5 m) missile was fired by compressed air, with engine ignition at 70 feet (21 m).
- Mercury astronaut Donald "Deke" Slayton was found to have an irregular heartbeat while undergoing centrifuge training, later diagnosed as atrial fibrillation. A month later, he was disqualified from spaceflight. Slayton would eventually fly in space in 1975 as part of the Apollo–Soyuz Test Project.
- Poet Frank O'Hara created what he called "Personism", noting later in "Personism: A Manifesto" that "It was founded by me after lunch with LeRoi Jones on August 27, 1959, a day in which I was in love with someone not Roi, by the way, a blond). I went back to work and wrote a poem for this person. While I was writing it I was realizing that if I wanted to, I could use the telephone instead of writing the poem, and so Personism was born." He added "It is too new, too vital a movement to promise anything ..."

== August 28, 1959 (Friday) ==
- In the wake of runaway inflation, Indonesia reissued its currency, with 1,000 Indonesian rupiahs being replaced by 100 "new" rupiahs. Six years later, the currency would be reformed again with 1,000 new rupiahs being replaced by one rupiah.
- Supported by the Communist government of North Vietnam, the first mass uprising began in South Vietnam, starting in Trà Bồng District in the mountains of Quảng Ngãi Province. Sixteen villages were taken over by rebels, and the revolt spread to the neighboring districts of Sơn Trà, Ba Tơ and Minh Long.
- India's Prime Minister Jawaharlal Nehru declared in a speech before the Lok Sabha that India would protect the borders and independence of the Himalayan Kingdom of Bhutan.
- Thirty-two of the 35 passengers in an aerial tramway car died when a support broke as they were descending a mountain near São Paulo, Brazil. All were employees of the city power company.
- NASA Headquarters authorized the Space Task Group to enter into negotiations with the Air Force Ballistic Missile Division for the procurement of additional Atlas launch vehicles in support of Project Mercury.
- Died:
  - Raphael Lemkin, 59, Russian-born Jewish crusader who coined the word "genocide"
  - Bohuslav Martinů, 68, Czech composer

== August 29, 1959 (Saturday) ==
- The Casbah Coffee Club, located at West Derby in suburban Liverpool, opened for business. The Les Stewart Quartet had been scheduled to play on opening night, but the group broke up after an argument. Instead, Quartet members George Harrison and Ken Brown teamed up with two members of The Quarry Men, John Lennon and Paul McCartney, and the four guitarists played the opener. Dissatisfied with the pay, Brown quit The Quarry Men after six weeks, while Lennon, McCartney and Harrison went on to greater fame.
- Lightning killed nine people in one afternoon in the Northeastern United States. The dead were three picnickers in Pottsville, PA; two golfers, one in Hartford, CT and another in Rumson, NJ; a boater in White Plains, NY; a man working on a roof in Jersey City, NJ; a man standing outside in the Bronx in New York; and a housewife standing at her kitchen sink in Dartmouth, Massachusetts.
- Born:
  - Rebecca De Mornay, American actress (as Rebecca Jane Pearch) in Santa Rosa, California
  - Stephen Wolfram, British physicist and mathematician, in London

== August 30, 1959 (Sunday) ==
- The Pan-Somali Movement was organized at Mogadishu, with the goal of uniting the Somali people of Africa into one nation in the Horn of Africa.
- Dressed in a black cape with a red lining, 15-year-old Salvador Agron murdered two other teenagers, Tony Krzesinski and Bobby Young, on a New York City playground, in the mistaken belief that they were members of a rival street gang. The story would later inspire The Capeman, a 1998 Broadway musical authored by Paul Simon and Derek Walcott.
- South Vietnamese opposition figure Phan Quang Dan was elected to the National Assembly despite soldiers being bussed in to vote for President Ngo Dinh Diem's candidate.
- Born: Mark "Jacko" Jackson, Australian rules footballer and actor

== August 31, 1959 (Monday) ==
- King Norodom Suramarit and Queen Sisowath Kosamak of Cambodia escaped an assassination attempt when a present for the Queen was opened instead by the Chief of Protocol, Prince Norodom Vakrivin. A bomb inside the package exploded, killing Vakrivin and two other servants. Ten years later, Trần Kim Tuyến, who had been director of intelligence for South Vietnam at the time, admitted that the gift box had been prepared on orders of Ngô Đình Nhu, because the Queen was known to enjoy opening her own gifts.
- Born: Tony DeFranco, Canadian pop singer
- Died: David Carr, a 25-year-old English apprentice printer, died at the Manchester Royal Infirmary from an unknown disease that destroyed his immune system, and tissue samples were saved for future study. Thirty years later, a team of researchers would conclude that Carr (whose name would be revealed by a newspaper exposé) had been infected with HIV, more than 20 years before the virus's identification as the cause of AIDS, and reported their results in the July 7, 1990, issue of The Lancet.
