= Typhoon Billie (1959) =

Pacific typhoon in 1959

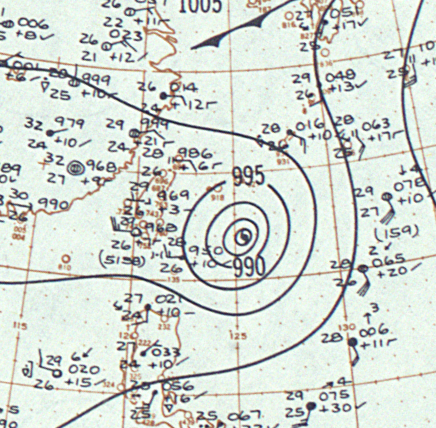
- Surface weather analysis of Billie at peak intensity on July 14

Meteorological history
- Formed: July 12, 1959
- Dissipated: July 18, 1959

Typhoon
- 10-minute sustained (JMA)
- Lowest pressure: 970 hPa (mbar); 28.64 inHg

Category 2-equivalent typhoon
- 1-minute sustained (SSHWS/JTWC)
- Highest winds: 165 km/h (105 mph)

Overall effects
- Fatalities: 51 direct, 68 indirect
- Damage: $500,000 (1959 USD)
- Areas affected: Philippines, Taiwan, China, Japan, South Korea
- IBTrACS
- Part of the 1959 Pacific typhoon season

Typhoon Billie was the first typhoon officially monitored by the Joint Typhoon Warning Center. The storm brought floods to several East Asian countries in July 1959. Billie developed from a tropical disturbance west of Kiribati on July 12. Situated within favorable conditions, the system quickly reached tropical storm intensity before strengthening further to typhoon status a day after formation. Intensification continued until Billie reached its peak intensity on July 14 east of Taiwan with maximum sustained winds of 165 km/h (103 mph) and a minimum barometric pressure of 970 mbar (hPa; 28.64 inHg). (Note: All measurements and estimates of maximum sustained wind are sustained over a one-minute period, following convention set by the JTWC.) Slight weakening occurred before the typhoon made landfall on Zhejiang in China on July 16. After tracking inland, Billie curved northward and moved over the Yellow Sea before making a final landfall on North Korea on July 17; the storm transitioned into an extratropical cyclone shortly afterwards before dissipating over the Sea of Japan a day later.

The rainbands of Billie brought severe flooding to the Philippines and Japan even while the typhoon's center was well removed from those locations. In the Philippines, one person was killed, and the flood damage totaled US$500,000. (Note: All monetary values are in their respective currency's worth in 1959.) Floods were particularly destructive in Japan, where they destroyed 603 homes in the western portion of the country. Swaths of crops were inundated by the floodwaters, and 44 people were killed. Extensive flooding occurred in Taiwan and China, and seven deaths occurred in the former. In Busan, South Korea, Billie's effects forced the evacuation of thousands of people through tight corridors from a stadium, causing the indirect deaths of 61 people.

== Meteorological history ==
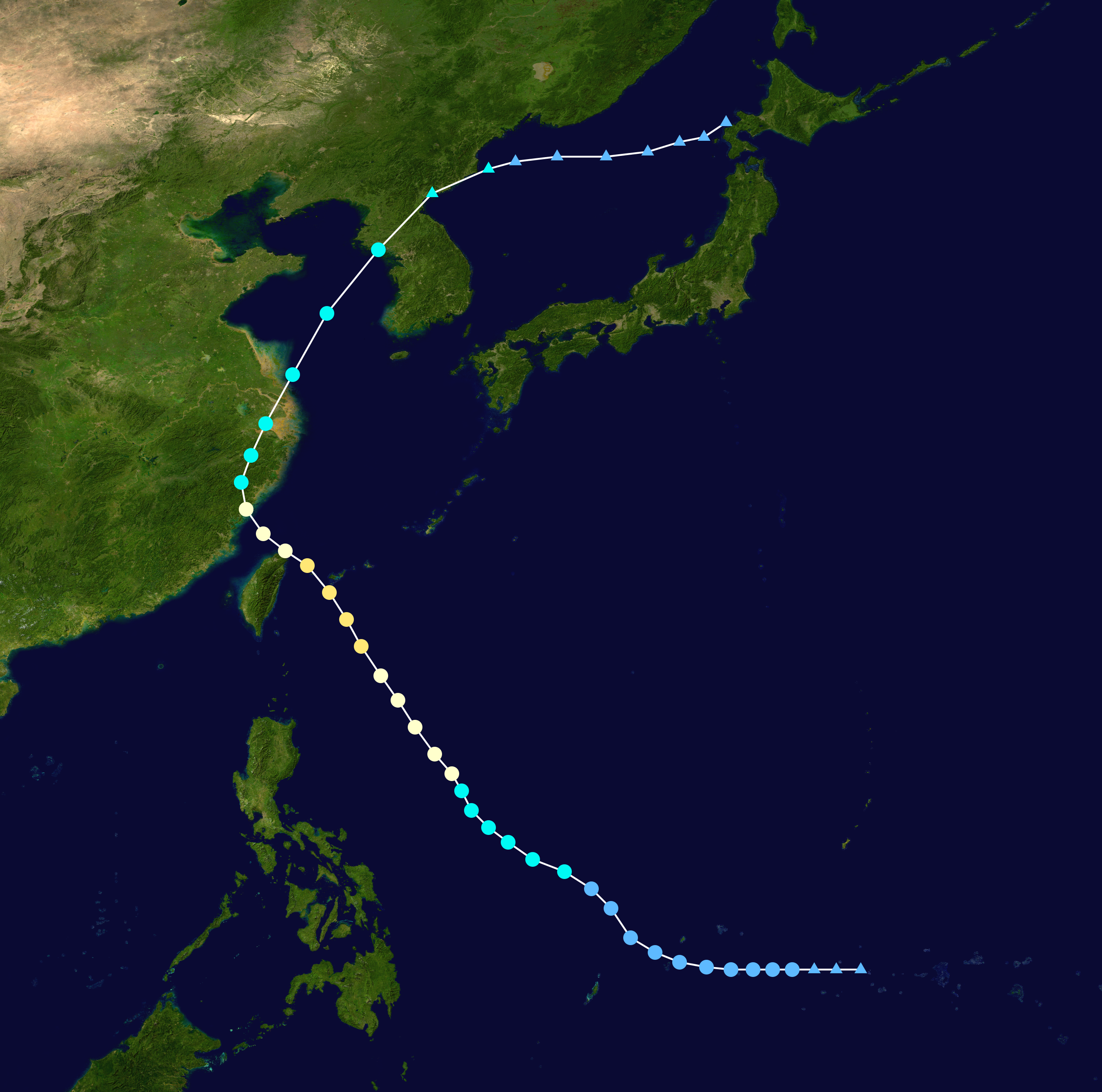
Map plotting the storm's track and intensity, according to the Saffir–Simpson scale Map key Saffir–Simpson scale Tropical depression (≤38 mph, ≤62 km/h) Tropical storm (39–73 mph, 63–118 km/h) Category 1 (74–95 mph, 119–153 km/h) Category 2 (96–110 mph, 154–177 km/h) Category 3 (111–129 mph, 178–208 km/h) Category 4 (130–156 mph, 209–251 km/h) Category 5 (≥157 mph, ≥252 km/h) Unknown Storm type Tropical cyclone Subtropical cyclone Extratropical cyclone, remnant low, tropical disturbance, or monsoon depression

Beginning on July 9, the Joint Typhoon Warning Center (JTWC) began dispatching aircraft reconnaissance to investigate an area of thunderstorms between Yap State and Koror that had potential to develop into a tropical cyclone. Tracking westward, there were few signs of organization or intensification until July 12, when recon found a closed atmospheric circulation within the disturbance, signifying that a tropical depression had developed; JTWC bulletins and warnings commenced accordingly. Upon development, observations indicated that the system was quickly developing in favorable conditions, with initial reconnaissance flights finding a loose eye measuring 160 km (99 mi) in diameter shortly after classification as a tropical depression. Twelve hours later, the JTWC upgraded the cyclone to tropical storm status, assigning the name Billie.

At 1200 UTC on July 13, the JTWC upgraded Billie further to typhoon status, making Billie the first tropical cyclone to be monitored by the JTWC since its inception earlier in 1959. Now tracking steadily towards the northwest, the typhoon reached its peak intensity at 1200 UTC the next day with maximum sustained winds of 165 km/h (103 mph) according to the JTWC and a minimum barometric pressure assessed by the Japan Meteorological Agency (JMA) at 970 mbar (hPa; 28.64 inHg). By this time Billie's eye had shrunk to a size roughly 50 km (31 mi) in diameter. At 0900 UTC on July 15, Billie passed just 30 km (19 mi) north of Taiwan; fifteen hours later the typhoon made landfall north of Fuzhou, China in Zhejiang with winds estimated at 120 km/h (75 mph).

Upon tracking inland on July 16, interaction with China's mountainous terrain disrupted the organization of Billie, weakening it down to tropical storm intensity. However, the tropical cyclone's stint over land was short-lived as the system quickly curved northward into the Yellow Sea by July 17. Despite moving back over water, Billie continued to weaken, and made landfall on the western coast of North Korea with winds of 75 km/h (47 mph). Over the Korean Peninsula, Billie began to intake cold air from a polar front, enabling the system to transition into an extratropical cyclone by 1800 UTC that day. These remnants tracked eastward across the Sea of Japan before they were last noted just off of Hokkaido on July 18.

== Impact ==
As Billie tracked to the east of the Philippines, the outer rainbands of the tropical cyclone produced heavy rainfall to the archipelago, the Ryukyu Islands, and the main islands of Japan. In the Philippines, the rains triggered floods that led to the death of one person and US$500,000 in damage. About 100 people were displaced on the islands due to the rainfall. The Japanese freighter Bansei Maru was grounded on a reef off of Ishigaki Island due to the rough surf and winds caused by the passing typhoon, necessitating a rescue operation by three United States Navy ships. On the island, 16 homes were destroyed and 49 were heavily damaged. Inundation of crops was prevalent. Flooding from Billie was highly destructive in areas of Japan west of the Chūbu region, destroying 603 homes and inundating 77,288 others. Roughly 325 km^{2} (125 sq mi) of farmland was impacted by the rains. Across Japan, 44 people were killed and 77 were injured.

In northern Taiwan, Billie caused widespread flash flooding, displacing thousands of people and resulting in extensive damage. Approximately one-third of Taipei was inundated by floodwaters, and hospital patients were forced to evacuate to Okinawa after a Military Assistance Advisory Group compound was impacted by the heavy rains. Over 10,000 people were rendered homeless in Taipei alone after the city's shanty-type dwellings along with well-built residences were destroyed. In total, the effects of Billie in Taiwan killed seven people. Extensive flooding also occurred in nearby eastern China, inundating rice fields. In order to avoid the storm, thousands of fishermen sought shelter in local harbors. Cleanup and relief operations quickly ensued following the storm's passage.

Storms accompanying Billie and its remnants brought heavy rains and strong winds to South Korea, knocking out police telephone lines in Busan. The sudden onslaught of these storms caused a stampede of roughly 70,000 people out of a stadium, resulting in the indirect deaths of 68 people, including 51 children. Around 125 people were injured and 40 were hospitalized after the mass evacuation.

== See also ==
- Typhoon Norris (1980)
- Typhoon Nelson (1985)
- Typhoon Matmo (2014)
