= Jatayu (disambiguation) =

Jatayu could mean:

- Jatayu (Ramayana), the bird in the Hindu epic Ramayana
- Jatayu Earth's Center Nature Park in Kerala, featuring a 61 m long statue of the bird
- Jatayu (book), a collection of poems by Sitanshu Yashaschandra
- Jatayu Airlines, an Indonesian airline company
- Lalmohan Ganguly, alias Jatayu, a character in the Feluda stories by Satyajit Ray
- Garakamanthana Palya, a neighbourhood in Bangalore named after Garakamanthana, another name of Jatayu.
