= May 1961 =

Month of 1961

<<	May 1961					>>
Su	Mo	Tu	We	Th	Fr	Sa
	1	2	3	4	5	6
7	8	9	10	11	12	13
14	15	16	17	18	19	20
21	22	23	24	25	26	27
28	29	30	31

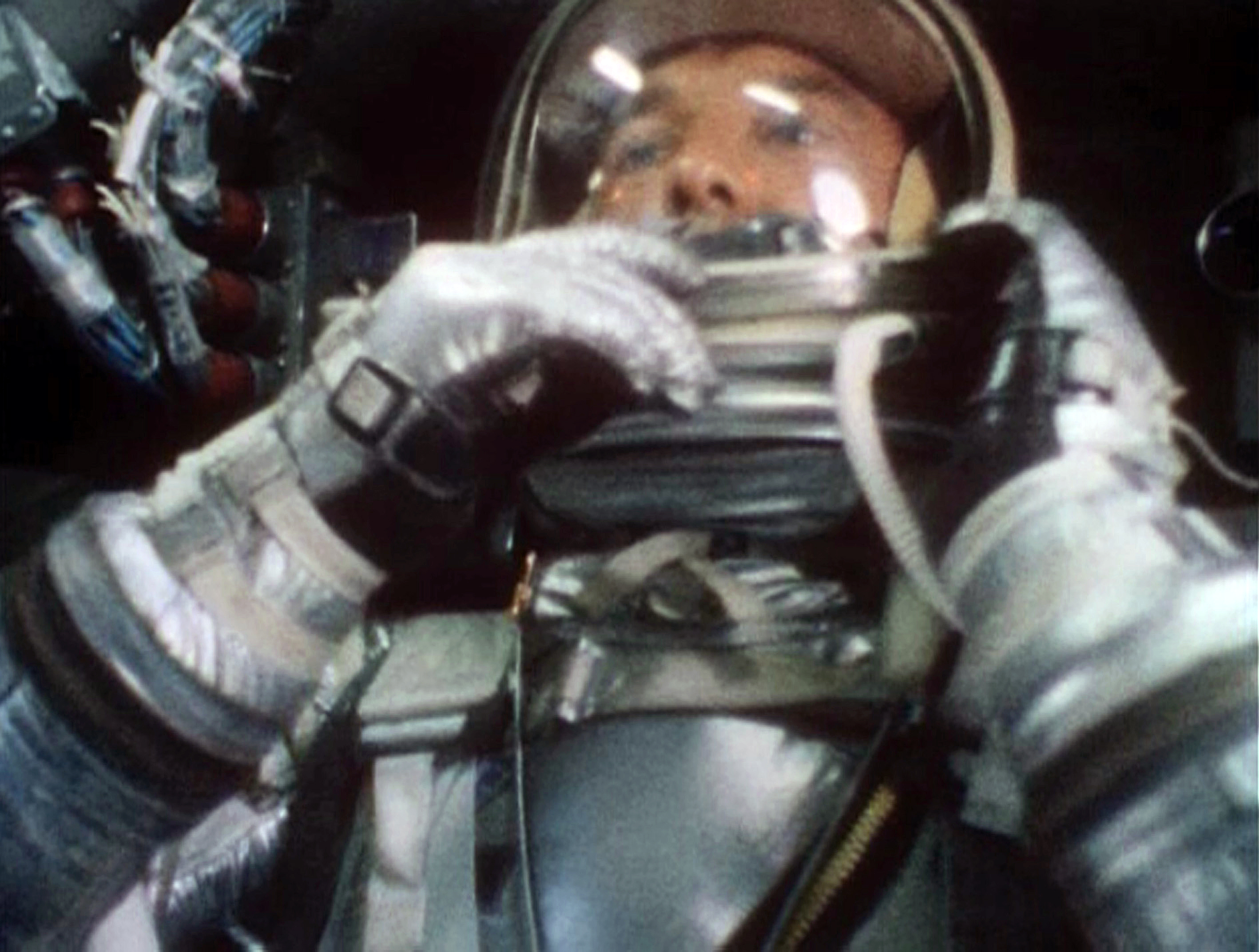
May 5, 1961: Alan Shepard becomes first American in space

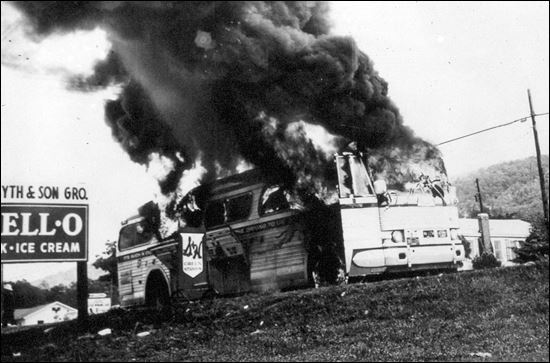
May 14, 1961: Freedom Riders attacked by angry mob near Anniston, Alabama

The following events occurred in May 1961:

== May 1, 1961 (Monday) ==
- A wave of hijackings of U.S. airline flights to Cuba began as Miami electrician Antuilio Ortiz, who had purchased a ticket listing himself on the manifest as "Cofresi Elpirata" (after the 19th century Caribbean pirate Roberto Cofresí), entered the cockpit of National Airlines Flight 337 shortly after it took off from Marathon, Florida to Key West, then forced the pilot to fly to Havana. Cuba's leader Fidel Castro allowed the plane, its crew, and all but one of its passengers to return to the U.S. the next day. Ortiz stayed behind and would live comfortably in Cuba for two years before becoming homesick for the U.S. After being incarcerated several times in Cuban prisons, Ortiz would finally be allowed to leave in 1975, and would spend four years in an American prison for the 1961 crime. In the next 12 years after Ortiz hijacked the flight, there would be 185 successful skyjackings until massive security measures were enacted by the U.S. at the end of 1972; only two of 42 attempts were successful for the rest of the 1970s.
- Betting shops became legal in the United Kingdom, permitting UK residents to place bets, through a bookie, on horse races without going to the track.
- Anticipating expansion of human spaceflight programs, Space Task Group (STG) proposed a crewed spacecraft development center. The nucleus for a center existed in STG, which was handling the Mercury program, and noted that a larger program would require more staff and facilities, stricter management controls.
- Born: Clint Malarchuk, Canadian ice hockey player; in Grande Prairie, Alberta

== May 2, 1961 (Tuesday) ==
- In Iran, a teachers' strike began as more than 50,000 educators walked off the job and began protesting working conditions and wages. Believing that the strike had been instigated by the American CIA, Iran's monarch Mohammad Reza Pahlavi attempted to have the unrest suppressed by the Iranian Army, but would be forced to meet the teachers' demands three days later after learning that the military would not authorize troops to fire on demonstrators. Pahlavi then fired his prime minister, Jafar Sharif-Emami, and replaced him with Ali Amini.
- The training vessel Albatross was hit by a white squall about 125 miles (201 km) west of the Dry Tortugas. The schooner sank almost instantly, taking with it six people - Alice Sheldon, ship's cook George Ptacnik, and students Chris Coristine, John Goodlett, Rick Marsellus, and Robin Wetherill. Thirteen other people on the student ship survived. The tragedy would later form the basis for the 1996 film White Squall.
- Led by Manuel Artime, a group of 22 members of Brigade 2506, in hiding since the failure of the April 17 Bay of Pigs Invasion of Cuba, were captured alive in Matanzas Province near a sugar mill at Covadonga.
- Light from a supernova within the galaxy NGC 4564, located 57.2 megalight-years from Earth, more than 57,200,000 after a star within that system had exploded.

== May 3, 1961 (Wednesday) ==
- Former British diplomat George Blake was sentenced to 42 years imprisonment for spying, one year for the life of each of the 42 British agents who died after Blake had betrayed them. Blake had been the UK's vice-consul in South Korea before being captured during the Korean War and spending three years in an internment camp, and was later caught passing secrets of the British Navy to the Soviet Union. He escaped London's Wormwood Scrubs Prison on October 22, 1965, and eventually settled in Moscow.
- A group of prominent civil rights activists, including John Lewis, Stokely Carmichael, Diane Nash and James Lawson, held the "Last Supper" in Washington, D.C., so-called because the Freedom Riders at the dinner believed they would be killed in the South when they began the Freedom Ride the next day.
- The U.S. federal minimum wage was raised to $1.25 per hour by a 230–196 vote in the House of Representatives. Earlier, the U.S. Senate had approved the measure, advocated by President Kennedy, by a 64–28 vote.
- The 1961 Cannes Film Festival opened.
- Born:
  - Joe Murray, American animator, and cartoonist known for creating Rocko's Modern Life and Camp Lazlo; in San Jose, California
  - Leyla Zana, Kurdish rights activist and Turkish member of the Grand National Assembly Kurdish politician; in Silvan

== May 4, 1961 (Thursday) ==
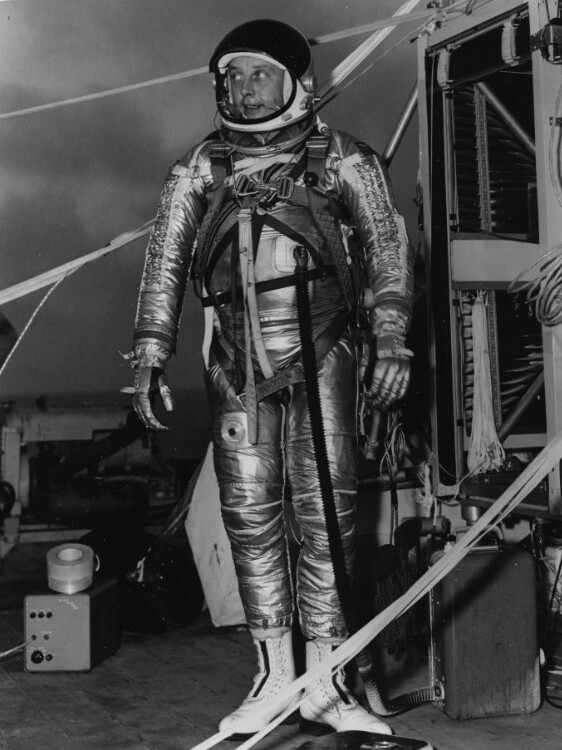
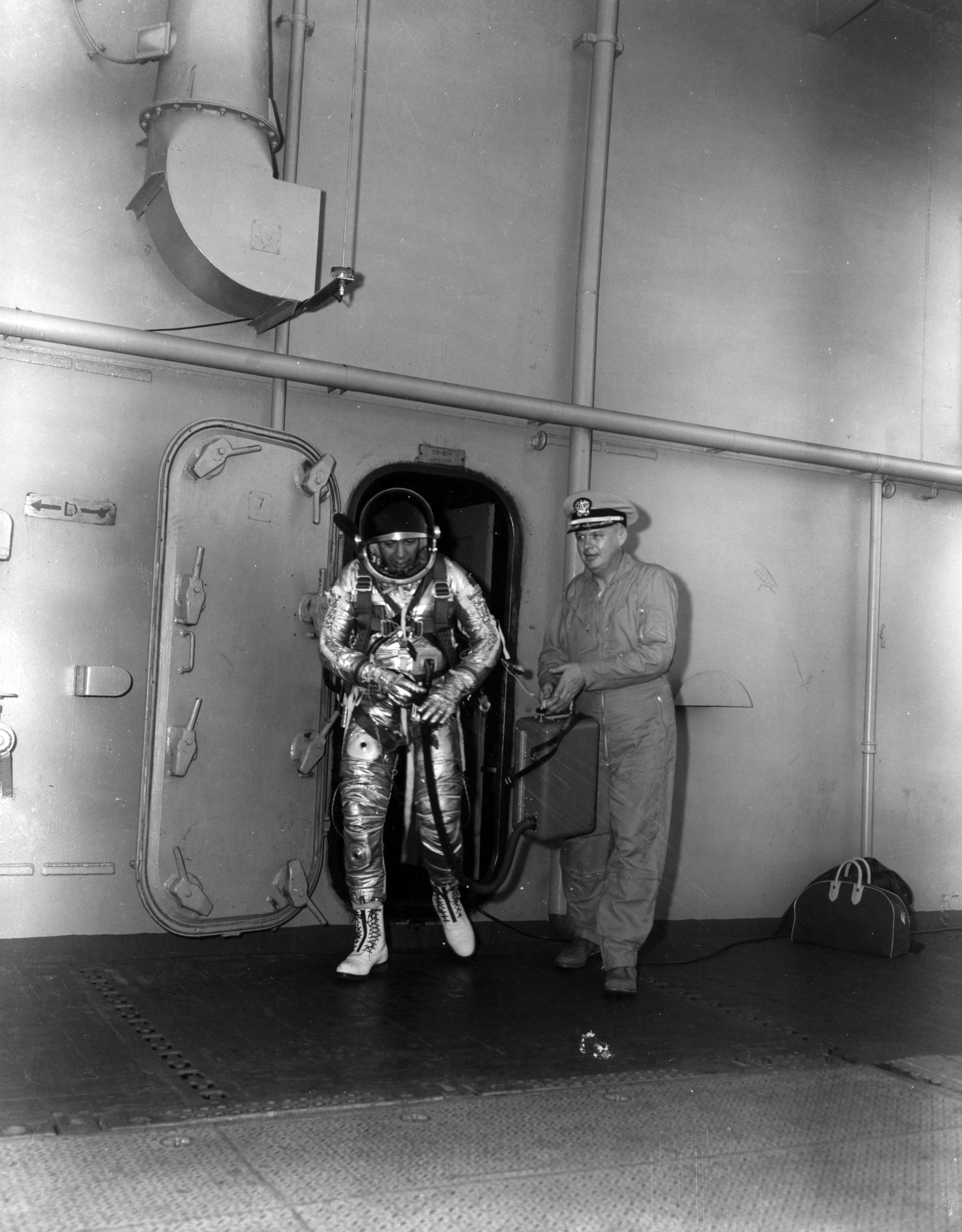
Lt. Commander Prather and Commander Ross
- Commander Malcolm Ross and Lieutenant Commander Victor A. Prather set a new record for the highest balloon flight while testing full pressure flight suits. The two U.S. Navy officers ascended to 113,740 feet (34.67 km) over the Gulf of Mexico before landing successfully. Commander Ross was safely transported to USS Antietam (CVS-36) by helicopter. Lieutenant Commander Prather subsequently slipped from the sling and drowned after his suit flooded.
- U.S. Representative Overton Brooks (D-Louisiana), chairman of the House Committee on Science and Astronautics, wrote a detailed memo to U.S. Vice President Lyndon B. Johnson, chairman of the National Aeronautics and Space Council, advocating the appropriation of additional federal funds to the U.S. space program in order "to gain unequivocal leadership in Space Exploration".
- During the tornado outbreak, near Geary, Oklahoma, the new practice of storm chasing yielded the first motion and still pictures taken of a tornado simultaneous with film of its progress on radar, as part of the National Severe Storms Project.
- Anthony Neil Wedgwood Benn, 2nd Viscount Stansgate, won the 1961 Bristol South East by-election for the House of Commons constituency of Bristol South East. An Election Court would later award the seat to Benn's opponent, Malcolm St Clair.
- In the U.S., 13 members of the "Freedom Riders" began a bus trip to test the limits on segregation on interstate bus rides, following the new U.S. Supreme Court integration ruling in Boynton v. Virginia.
- In the U.S., the Federal Aviation Administration initiated the creation of a comprehensive flight information service.
- Queen Elizabeth II appointed Sir Ashley Clarke a Knight Grand Cross of the Royal Victorian Order.
- Born:
  - Paul Steven Miller, American law professor and Commissioner of the Equal Employment Opportunity Commission, 1994 to 2004; in Flushing, Queens (died from cancer, 2010)
  - Richard Hill, English rugby union scrum-half with 29 appearances for the England national team between 1984 and 1991; in Birmingham
  - Donald Lawrence, American gospel music songwriter and Grammy Award winner; in Charlotte, North Carolina
  - Mary Elizabeth McDonough, American actress best known as "Erin" on The Waltons; in Los Angeles, California
  - General Peter Bartram, Chief of Defence for Denmark from 2012 to 2016; in Aarhus
  - Anne Murray, cricketer for the Irish national women's team; in Dublin
  - Luis Herrera, Colombian road racing cyclist; in Fusagasugá
- Died: Anita Stewart (born Anna Marie Stewart), 66, American silent film actress and producer, died of a heart attack

== May 5, 1961 (Friday) ==
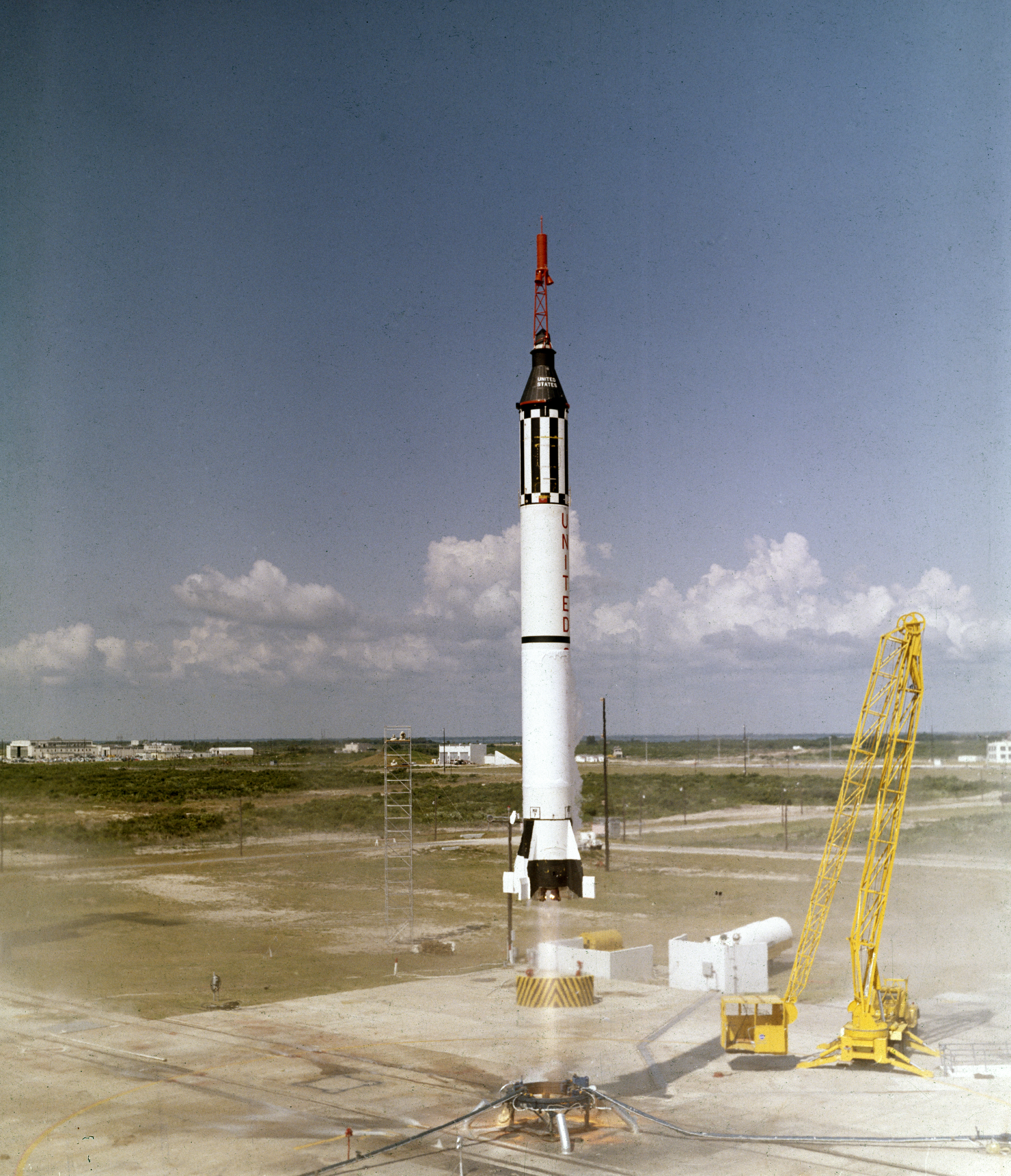
May 5, 1961: Launch of Freedom 7

- At 9:34 a.m., Alan Shepard became the first American in space as Mercury 3 lifted off from Cape Canaveral. Shepard's spacecraft Freedom 7, first of the Mercury program, reached an altitude of 115 miles (185 km) without achieving orbit, and was recovered 19 minutes later by the aircraft carrier USS Lake Champlain (CV-39). The mission featured the first manual piloting of the spacecraft and also the landing with pilot still within it.
- A NASA working group led by Bernard Maggin delivered its proposals for an integrated research, development, and applied orbital operations program, at a cost of one billion dollars, to guide the program through 1970. The group identified three categories of orbital operations: inspection, ferry, and orbital launch. Maggin argued that future U.S. space programs would require capability for such orbital operations and recommended an integrated program, coordinated with the U.S. Department of Defense, but independent of other space programs and with a separate project office.
- NASA proposed using Scout rockets to launch small satellites that would evaluate the Mercury Tracking Network in preparation for crewed orbital missions. NASA Headquarters tentatively approved the plan on May 24.

== May 6, 1961 (Saturday) ==
- Carry Back, ridden by Johnny Sellers, won the Kentucky Derby. The racehorse, bred from a mare who had cost only $300, would earn more than a million dollars for his owners. Carry Back won the Preakness Stakes, but failed to win the third part of U.S. horse racing's Triple Crown, finishing 7th in the Belmont Stakes.
- Tottenham Hotspur F.C. defeated Leicester City 2–0 in the 1961 FA Cup Final before a crowd of 100,000 at Wembley, becoming the first team in the 20th century to win the English league and cup double. Aston Villa had won the double back in 1897.
- Born:
  - George Clooney, American actor, director, screenwriter, producer, and activist; in Lexington, Kentucky
  - Patty Ryan, German pop music singer; in Wuppertal, West Germany (d. 2023)
  - Wally Wingert, American voice actor and former DJ; in Des Moines
- Died: Lucian Blaga, 65, Romanian poet, dramatist and philosopher

== May 7, 1961 (Sunday) ==
- China's Prime Minister Zhou Enlai called for the elimination of the government's "collective dining hall" program, telephoning Communist Party Chairman Mao Zedong, who had instituted the reform during the "Great Leap Forward" campaign of 1958. Premier Zhou made the call after touring rural villages in Handan County of Hebei Province, and seeing proof of malnutrition and famine. Beginning in June, people would be allowed to produce their own food rather than having all resources limited to the village "mess halls".
- The Soviet Union restored capital punishment for embezzlement of public property. Legal execution had been abolished for all purposes on May 26, 1947, but was gradually introduced for various crimes starting in 1950. Females were exempt from the death penalty under any circumstances, as were men who had reached the age of 60 by the time of their sentencing.
- UA Sedan-Torcy defeated Nîmes Olympique 3–1 in the Coupe de France Final before 45,000 at Colombes, France.
- Died: Mukerjee (Yebaw Phyu Win), Burmese Communist leader; in a police raid

== May 8, 1961 (Monday) ==
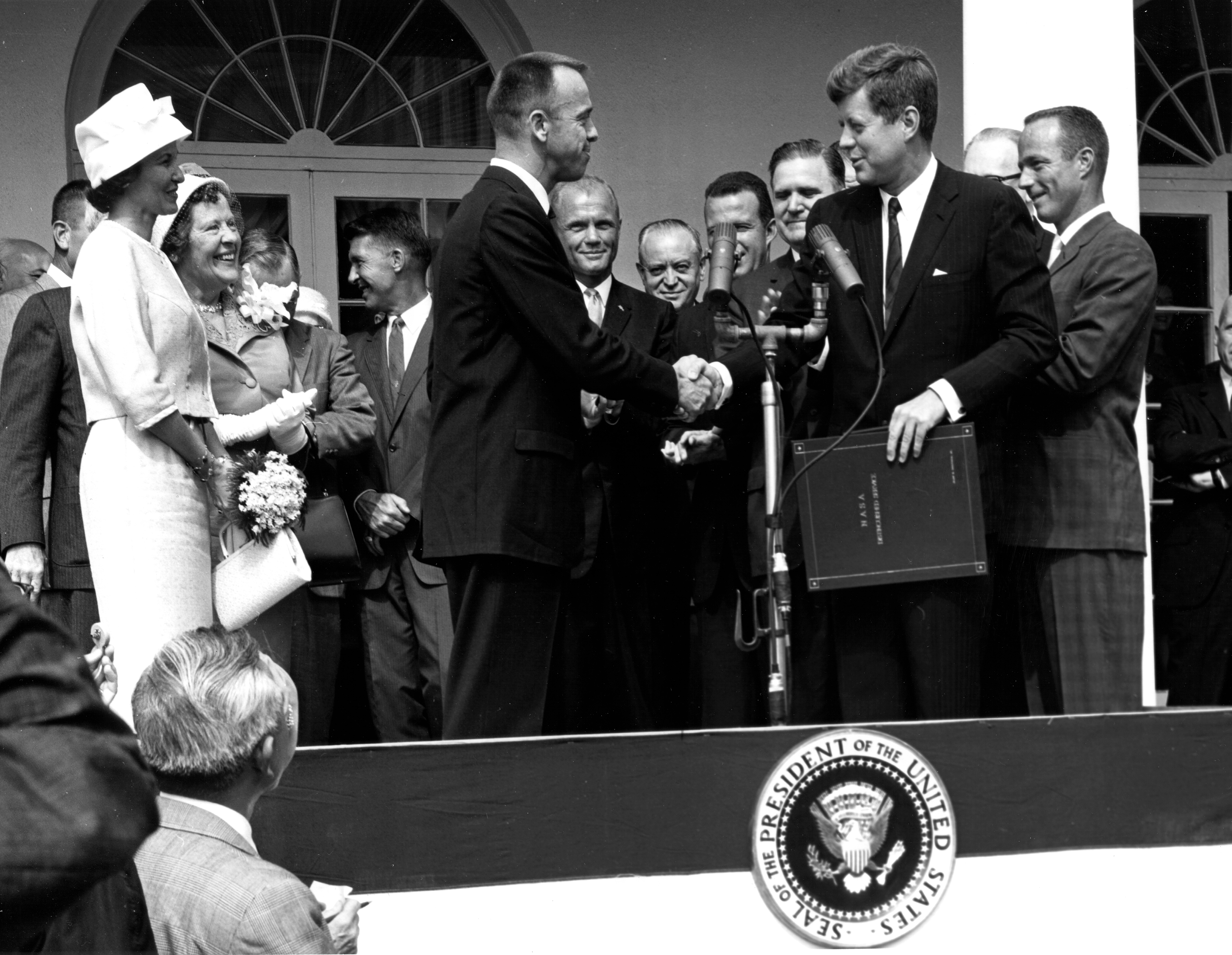
May 8, 1961: Shepard receives NASA Distinguished Service Medal

- At the Savoy Hilton Hotel in New York City, the name of New York's new expansion team in the National League was made official. Joan Payson, the majority owner of the team, christened it as the New York Mets "by breaking a champagne bottle with a baseball bat." The name, short for Metropolitans, was chosen by the public, although Mrs. Payson's personal preference was the "Meadowlarks", and out of 9,613 suggestions, 644 names were selected and then reduced to ten, the other nine choices being Avengers, Bees, Burros, Continentals, Jets, NYBs, Rebels, Skyliners and Skyscrapers.
- President John F. Kennedy presented the NASA Distinguished Service Medal to Astronaut Alan Shepard, pilot of the Freedom 7 spacecraft, in a ceremony at the White House.
- Martin Company personnel briefed NASA Associate Director Robert C. Seamans, Jr. on using the Titan II missile system as a rocket to be launched for a crewed lunar landing. Although skeptical, Seamans arranged for a more formal presentation to Abe Silverstein, NASA Director, Office of Space Flight Programs, who was sufficiently impressed by the briefing to ask Director Robert R. Gilruth and Space Task Group to study possible Titan II uses, including the use of a Titan II to launch a scaled-up Mercury spacecraft.
- The comic strip Apartment 3-G, about three career women sharing an apartment in Manhattan, made its first appearance.
- Born: David Winning, Canadian-American film director; in Calgary

== May 9, 1961 (Tuesday) ==
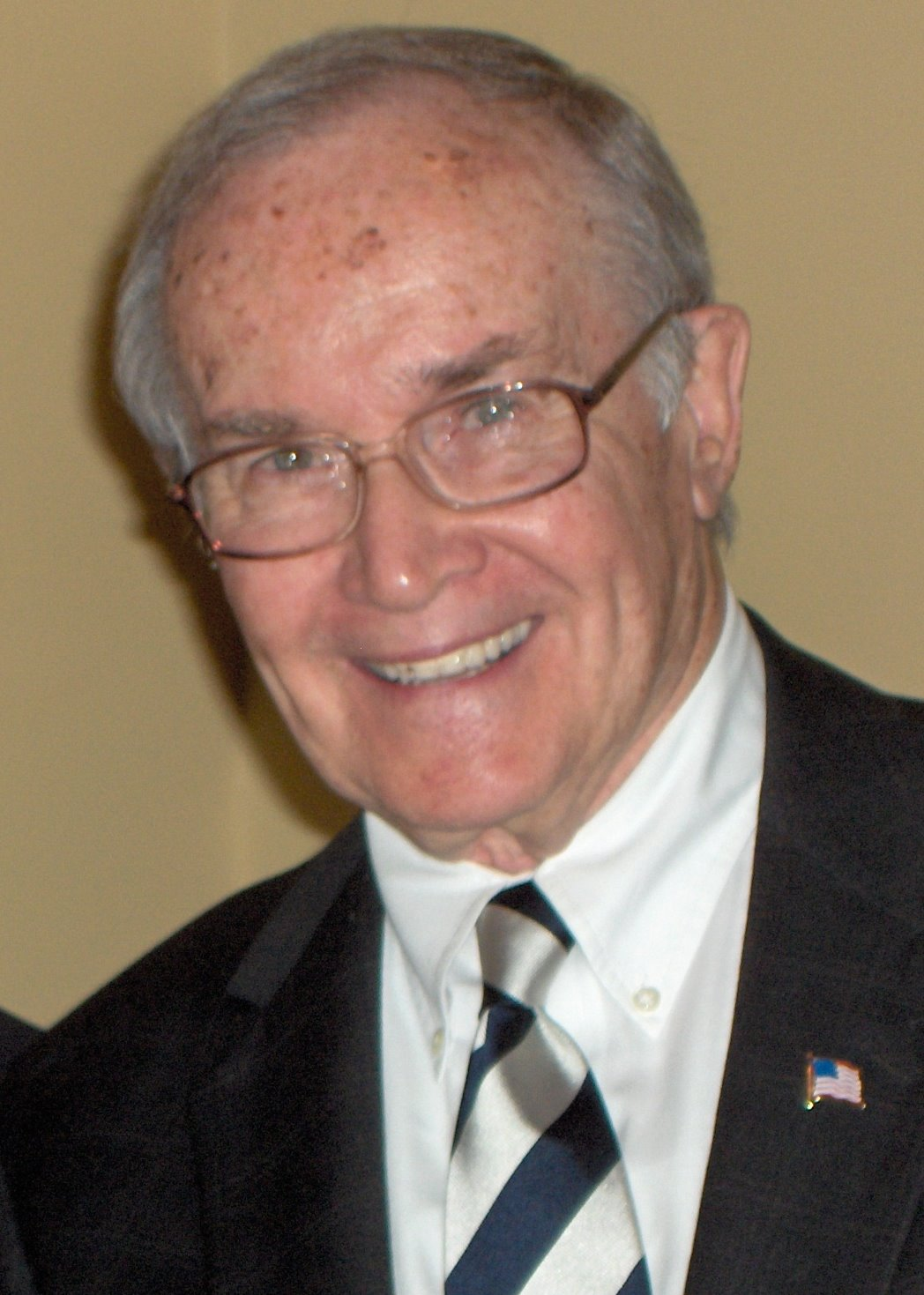
Minow in 2006

- Describing American television as "a vast wasteland", Federal Communications Commission Chairman Newton N. Minow addressed the National Association of Broadcasters in Washington, and implied that the FCC might not renew licenses of those entities that failed to upgrade their product. "I invite each of you to sit down in front of your television set when your station goes on the air and stay there, for a day, without a book, without a magazine, without a newspaper, without a profit and loss sheet or a rating book to distract you. Keep your eyes glued to that set until the station signs off. I can assure you that what you will observe is a vast wasteland," said Minow. "You will see a procession of game shows, formula comedies about totally unbelievable families, blood and thunder, mayhem, violence, sadism, murder, western bad men, western good men, private eyes, gangsters, more violence, and cartoons. And endlessly, commercials – many screaming, cajoling, and offending. And most of all, boredom. True, you'll see a few things you will enjoy. But they will be very, very few. And if you think I exaggerate, I only ask you to try it."
- The second launch of the sounding rocket RM-89 Blue Scout I took place at Cape Canaveral, but the 72-foot (22 m) tall missile wobbled and veered off course. Ground control destroyed the errant vehicle.

== May 10, 1961 (Wednesday) ==
- The first demonstration of speech synthesis by a computer took place at a meeting in Philadelphia as John Larry Kelly Jr. and colleagues Carol Lochbaum and Louis Gerstman used a IBM 7094 computer to synthesize speech by singing a rendition of the song "Daisy Bell".
- All 79 people on board Air France Flight 406 were killed when the Super Constellation crashed in the Sahara Desert while en route from Bangui to Marseille.
- Charles R. Swart, the final Governor-General of South Africa, was elected as that nation's first State President. The vote in Parliament was 139–71 in favour of Swart over former Chief Justice Henry A. Fagan. Swart took office as State President on the 31st of May, the date the Union of South Africa became a republic and left the Commonwealth of Nations.
- Born:
  - Danny Carey, American drummer of Tool; in Paola, Kansas
  - Johanna ter Steege, Dutch actress; in Wierden

== May 11, 1961 (Thursday) ==
- The Russell Cave National Monument was established in Alabama with a donation of 310 acres (1.3 km^{2}) of land by the National Geographic Society. Located near Bridgeport, Alabama, the cave was used as shelter by human beings for more than 8,000 years, dating back as far as 6500 BC.
- U.S. President John F. Kennedy issued National Security Action Memorandum (NSAM) 52, authorizing the Central Intelligence Agency (CIA) to begin a program of covert actions in South Vietnam to prepare the way for an eventual landing of American troops in the southeast Asian nation.
- The popular Belgian comic book Bobo, created by Paul Deliège and Maurice Rosy and about the regular attempts by a convicted thief to escape from jail, debuted as a feature in the magazine Le Journal de Spirou.
- Mercury spacecraft 8A was delivered to Cape Canaveral for the Mercury 4 (MA-4) uncrewed space mission.
- Angelino Soler won the 1961 Vuelta a España cycle race.
- Born: Cecile Licad, Filipina classical pianist; in Manila
- Died: Yves Simon, 58, French political philosopher

== May 12, 1961 (Friday) ==
- Soviet leader Nikita Khrushchev "quite unexpectedly" accepted a suggestion from U.S. President John F. Kennedy that the two leaders meet at a conference in Vienna to discuss the future of Berlin. Kennedy and Khrushchev would shake hands in Austria on June 3.
- A brush fire in Hollywood, California, destroyed 24 houses, including the home of author Aldous Huxley, who lost almost all of his unpublished manuscripts and works in progress.
- Died: Tony Bettenhausen, 44, American racecar driver and USAC driving champion for 1958, was killed at the Indianapolis Motor Speedway while testing the car to be driven by his friend Paul Russo in advance of the 1961 Indianapolis 500. "Failure of a 10-cent bolt led to the death of the full time farmer and part time race driver," a UPI report would note the next day. As Bettenhausen entered a turn, the bolt fell off the car's front rod support and "permitted the front axle to twist, thereby misaligning the front wheels", according to the U.S. Auto Club's report. The vehicle veered into the outside retaining wall at 145 miles per hour (233 km/h), "climbed over it, upside down, and tore through an 8-foot high wire fence", bursting into flames on impact.

== May 13, 1961 (Saturday) ==
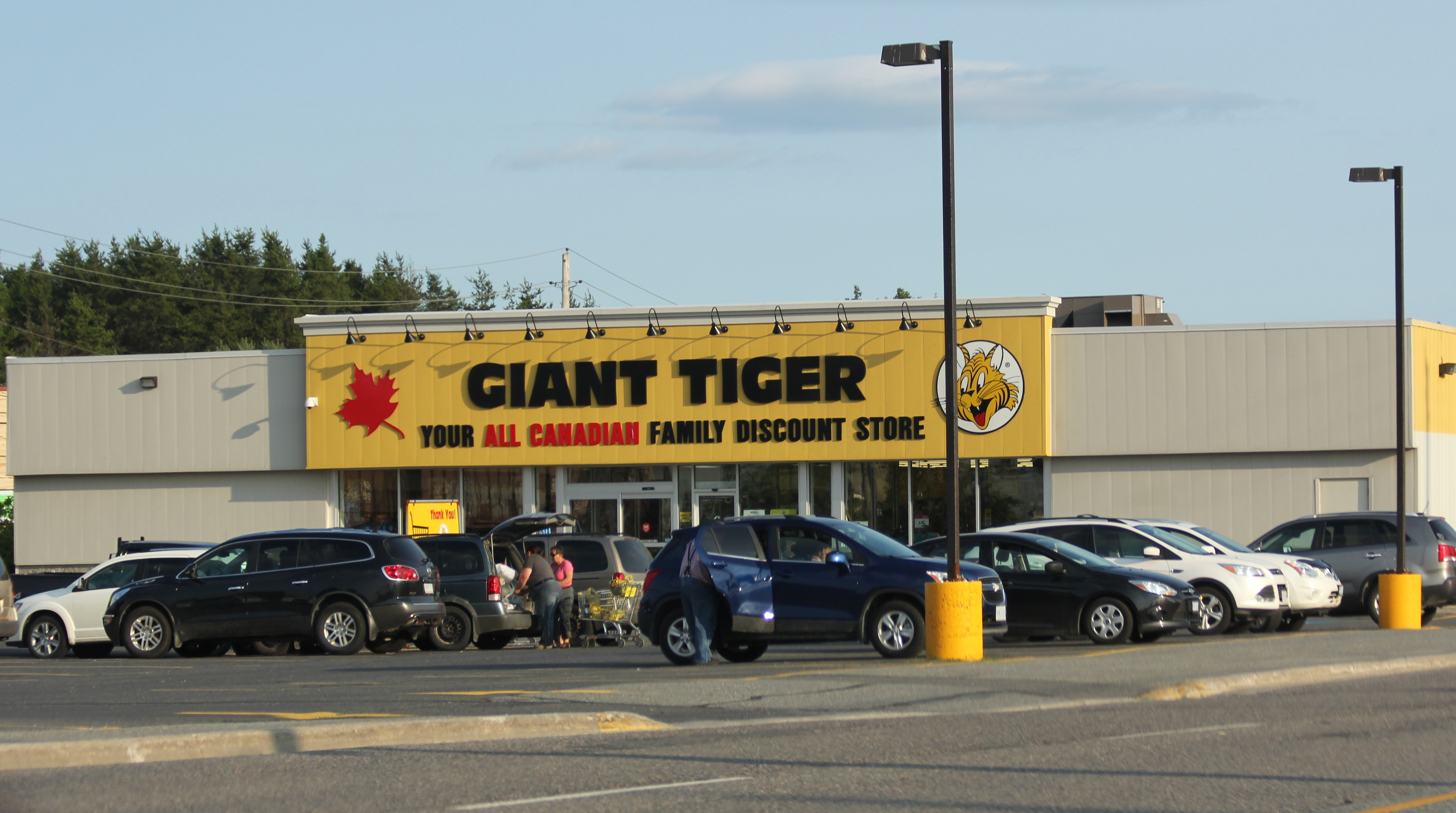
A Giant Tiger store in Espanola, Ontario

- Gordon Reid founded the Giant Tiger chain of Canadian discount stores, with the opening of the first store at 98 George Street in Ottawa; fifty years later, there would be more than 250 stores across seven Canadian provinces.
- NASA submitted its legislative program for the 87th Congress (S. 1857 and H.R. 7115), asking for authority to lease property, authority to acquire patent releases, replacement of semiannual reports to Congress with an annual one, and authority to indemnify contractors against unusually hazardous risks.
- The Coupe de France, the championship tournament of the Fédération Française de Football in professional soccer football, was won by UA Sedan-Torcy in a 3 to 1 defeat of Nîmes Olympique at the Stade Yves-du-Manoir in Colombes, near Paris.
- North Korea announced its creation of the Committee for the Peaceful Reunification of the Fatherland to promote its goal of Korean reunification, specifically to forment a revolution in South Korea and to reunite the Korean peninsula under Communist rule.
- Died: Gary Cooper, 60, American film star, died of colon cancer at his home in Bel Air in California. Cooper had won the Academy Award for Best Actor twice, for Sergeant York in 1942, and for High Noon in 1952.

== May 14, 1961 (Sunday) ==
- A Freedom Riders bus was fire-bombed near Anniston, Alabama and the civil rights protesters were beaten by an angry mob. Sixteen members of the Congress of Racial Equality (CORE) had divided their group at Atlanta, with nine riding on a Greyhound bus and seven others on a Trailways bus. Six miles beyond Anniston, a tire on the Greyhound bus was flattened. Unbeknownst to either the riders or the mob, Alabama special agent Eli M. Cowling had boarded that bus in Atlanta, and prevented the crowd from exacting further violence on the Riders, but the bus itself was burned by the firebomb. The Trailways bus riders arrived in Birmingham, where two of them were beaten up at the station.
- The Monaco Grand Prix was won by Stirling Moss, beginning the 12th FIA Formula One World Championship season.

== May 15, 1961 (Monday) ==
- The Nirenberg and Matthaei experiment, the first to enable recognition and understanding of the genetic code, was performed by Heinrich Matthaei. The date of the Poly-U-Experiment has been described as the birthdate of modern genetics.
- Marcel Mihalovici's opera Krapp's Last Tape premiered in a French-language version on RTF radio.

== May 16, 1961 (Tuesday) ==
- A military coup in South Korea overthrew the government of Prime Minister Chang Myon (John M. Chang) and President Yung Po Sun. At 3:30 in the morning local time, Republic of Korea forces led by Lt. Gen. Chang Do Yung seized control of police barracks and government offices in Seoul and other cities, then announced the takeover at 6:00 a.m. General Park Chung Hee, Deputy Commander of the ROK Second Army, soon took over as the new president. General Carter B. Magruder, Commander of the U.S. 8th Army and highest ranking American officer in Korea, declared American support for the Chang regime, but U.S. forces did not intervene during the tumult.
- On the first day of an official visit to Canada, U.S. President John F. Kennedy re-injured his back while participating in a tree planting ceremony at Ottawa. Kennedy, who had nearly died during back surgery in 1954, had been using a shovel to lift dirt, and was on crutches after returning home.

== May 17, 1961 (Wednesday) ==
- On the day that visiting U.S. President Kennedy was delivering a speech to a joint session of Canada's Parliament, Canadian Prime Minister John Diefenbaker found "a crumpled piece of paper in the wastebasket" of the room where the two leaders had met, and found it was a secret memorandum that had been left behind by the President, entitled "What We Want From the Ottawa Trip". According to one biographer of Diefenbaker, the first three points of what the U.S. wanted, on the memo, were "To push the Canadians towards an increased commitment to the Alliance for Progress", "To push them towards a decision to join the OAS" (Organization of American States), and "To push them towards a larger contribution for the India consortium". Another author would say later that Kennedy's handwritten notes in the margins of the memo included the letters "OAS", and that Diefenbaker believed that Kennedy had written "SOB" in reference to the Prime Minister. According to both accounts, Diefenbaker would angrily confront the U.S. Ambassador in May 1962 and threaten to reveal the contents of the discarded secret memo.
- The first fatality in the history of Little League Baseball occurred during an evening game in Temple City, California. Nine-year-old Barry Babcock was struck in the chest by a pitched ball, with impact above his heart, and collapsed and died from a cardiac dysrhythmia. One week later, the second fatality in Little League baseball would take place when ten-year-old George McCormick, of Park Ridge, Illinois, was struck in the head by a batted ball during practice.
- Space Task Group (STG) issued a Statement of Work for a Design Study of a Manned Spacecraft Paraglide Landing System. Before the end of June, the design study would formally become Phase I of the Paraglider Development Program.
- At the Torre Bert listening station, the Judica-Cordiglia brothers supposedly received calls for help from an unidentified and unrecognized Soviet spacecraft.
- Born: Enya, Irish singer and composer; as Eithne Patricia Ní Bhraonáin in Gweedore, County Donegal

== May 18, 1961 (Thursday) ==
- NASA Space Task Group (STG) Director Robert R. Gilruth announced that the plans for the Apollo program's first mission would have an adapter between the Saturn second stage and the Apollo spacecraft to include an orbiting laboratory. The specifications for the lab were 13 feet (4.0 m) in diameter and 7 ft 10 in (2.39 m) high, for experiments related to human operation of spacecraft. In response, Ames Director Smith J. DeFrance suggested a series of experiments that might be conducted from an Earth-orbiting laboratory, including astronomical observations, monitoring the solar activity; testing a human's ability to work outside the vehicle; zero-g testing; and a micrometeoroid impact study.
- Construction of the Cheyenne Mountain Complex, the heavily shielded site of the Command Operations Center of the North American Aerospace Defense Command (NORAD), began in the U.S. near Colorado Springs, Colorado, and would begin its first operations on September 3, 1965. Until its relocation inside Cheyenne Mountain, NORAD would operate at nearby Ent Air Force Base.
- The Sound of Music, already in its second year in the U.S. as a production on Broadway, opened its West End production in the UK at the Palace Theatre. Jean Bayless played the role of Maria and Roger Dann portrayed Captain von Trapp. The London show would run for 2,385 performances, closing on January 14, 1967.
- Born: General Anil Chauhan, Chief of Defence Staff of the Indian Armed Forces since 2022; in Gawana, Uttar Pradesh state (now Uttarakhand)

== May 19, 1961 (Friday) ==
- The Soviet space probe Venera 1 became the first man-made object to make a "fly-by" of another planet by passing Venus. However, the Soviet launched probe had lost contact with Earth a month earlier and did not send back any data.
- NASA Headquarters and the Space Task Group began a concerted effort to identify technical developments from Project Mercury that were potential inventions, discoveries, improvements, and innovations. This action was in keeping with the policy of providing information on technical advances, within security limits and when appropriate, to other agencies of the government and to American industry.

== May 20, 1961 (Saturday) ==
- Bashir Ahmad Sarban, an impoverished, 47-year-old camel driver in Pakistan, became a minor celebrity when then U.S. Vice President Lyndon Johnson visited Karachi and stopped his motorcade to see the camels. Johnson, who shook Bashir's hand and made a routine remark, "Come to Washington and see us sometime," and was surprised the next day when the Pakistani press reported that the camel driver had been invited to travel to the United States. With funding from the United States Information Agency and the People to People International program, the Kennedy Administration would arrange for Bashir Sarban to come to the U.S. later in the year.
- After having won the Kentucky Derby two weeks earlier, Carry Back won the Preakness Stakes, the second race of the U.S. Triple Crown of thoroughbred horse racing. Carry Back, however, would sustain an ankle injury prior to running in the Belmont Stakes on June 3, and would finish in seventh place.
- George Davies of the U.S. became the first person to break the world record for the pole vault by using a fiberglass pole, rather than steel or bamboo. Davies cleared 4.83 m (15 ft 10.2 in), breaking the record of 4.80 m (15 ft 9.0 in) set by Don Bragg ten months earlier.
- The west African nation of Mauritania ratified its first constitution, after having declared its independence on November 28, 1960.
- Died: Nannie Helen Burroughs, 82, African-American educator, religious leader and civil rights activist

== May 21, 1961 (Sunday) ==
- Alabama Governor John Patterson declared martial law in the city of Montgomery after race riots broke out. Major General Henry V. Graham was given virtually unlimited power to attempt to restore order.
- Died: B. J. Palmer, 79, American pioneer of chiropractic medicine

== May 22, 1961 (Monday) ==
- The next phase of the Nirenberg and Matthaei experiment began at 3:30 p.m. as Heinrich Matthaei began the process of adding a synthesized RNA molecule sample, "consisting of the simple repetition of one type of nucleotide", to a centrifuged sample of 20 amino acid proteins. The results were realized less than five days later on Saturday, May 27. At 6:00 in the morning, with the isolation of the amino acid of phenylalanine. "In less than a week," it would later be observed, "Matthaei had identified the first 'word' of the genetic code".
- The London Trophy was won at the Crystal Palace raceway by Roy Salvadori, who was driving a Cooper T53 Formula 1 race car and who finished eight seconds ahead of Henry Taylor.

== May 23, 1961 (Tuesday) ==
- The patent for the modern dropped ceiling, now universal in room construction, was issued to Donald A. Brown, who had applied for it on September 8, 1958. U.S. Patent No. 2,984,946 for "Accessible suspended ceiling construction" was granted to Brown who improved on the 1919 patent of Eric E. Hall's interlocking dropped ceiling tiles, with Donn Products' system of "slabs, panels, sheets or the like positioned on the upperside of, or held against the underside of the horizontal flanges of the supporting construction."
- A four-year scientific investigation by the U.S. Navy's Arctic Research Laboratory Ice Station of Fletcher's Ice Island, a massive (21-square-mile (54 km^{2})) floating iceberg, began.
- Died: Adela Pankhurst, 75, British-Australian suffragette and political activist.

== May 24, 1961 (Wednesday) ==
- A group of Freedom Riders was arrested in Jackson, Mississippi, for "disturbing the peace" after disembarking from their bus to try to use the white-only facilities at the Tri-State Trailways depot.
- The Milwaukee Road's Olympian Hiawatha passenger train made its final run in the U.S. between Chicago, Illinois, and Seattle, Washington.

== May 25, 1961 (Thursday) ==
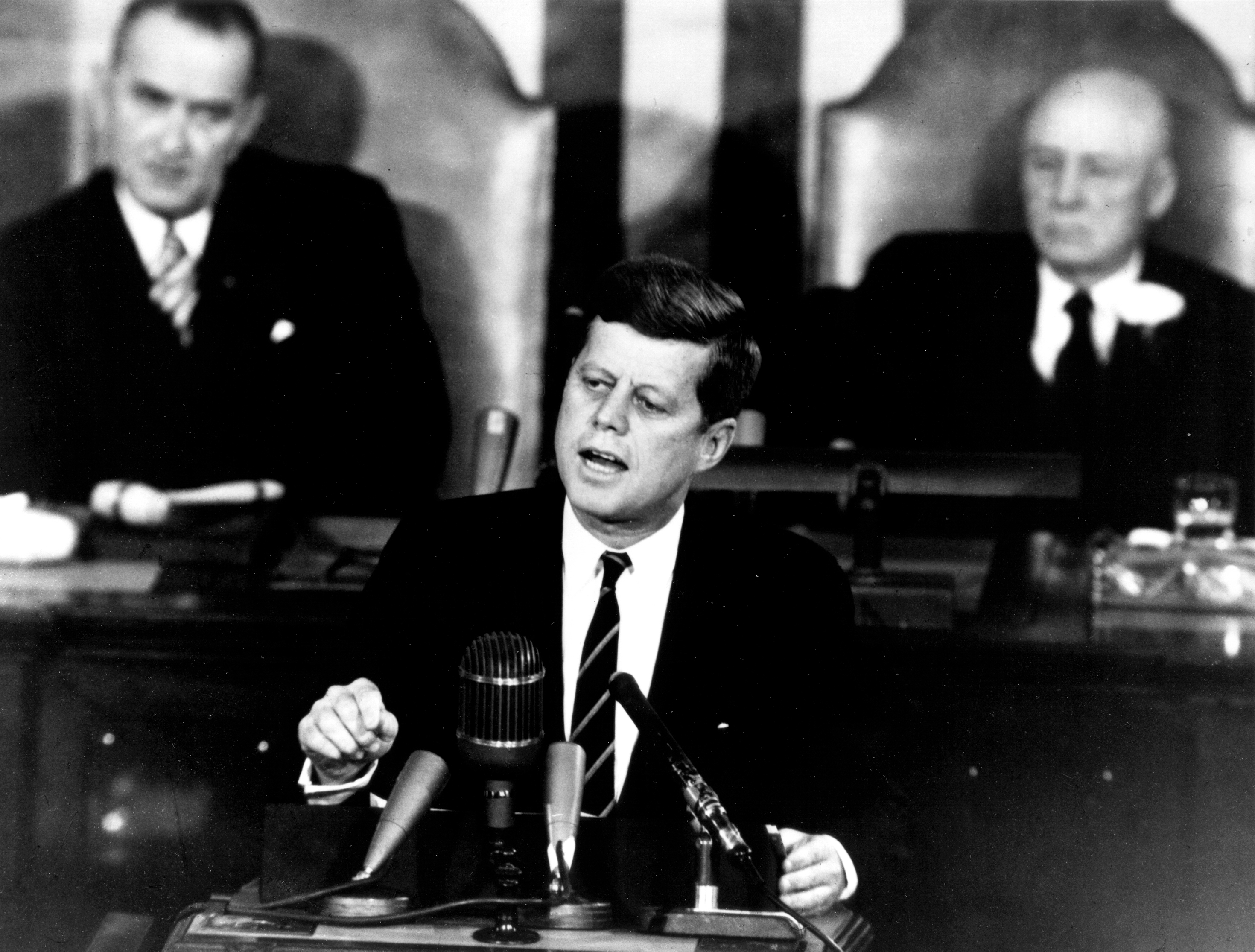
May 25, 1961: President Kennedy addresses Congress on "Urgent National Needs"

- Addressing a joint session of the United States Congress, U.S. President John F. Kennedy called for a vastly accelerated space program, declaring, "I believe this nation should commit itself to achieving the goal, before this decade is out, of landing a man on the Moon and returning him safely to the Earth." For this and associated projects in space technology, the President requested additional appropriations totaling $611 million for NASA and the Department of Defense. Congress would respond with increased funding for the Apollo program. Apollo 11 would land on the Moon, with 164 days left in the 1960s, on July 20, 1969.
- King Hussein of Jordan, 25, married an English commoner, 20-year-old Toni Gardiner (later renamed Princess Muna al-Hussein), making her his second wife. Gardiner was not present at the "all male" Muslim ceremony, which took place at the Zahran Palace near Amman and saw the king sign a wedding pledge. Initially, she was "neither a queen nor a princess" but took on the title and name "Sahibat al Sown Wa al Isma Muna al-Hussein".

== May 26, 1961 (Friday) ==
- The first conference on the "Peaceful Uses of Space" was held at Tulsa, Oklahoma and lasted for two days. A second, three-day conference on this subject would begin in Seattle, on May 8, 1962. In both instances, Robert R. Gilruth reported on the human spaceflight aspect.
- The Mercury spacecraft Freedom 7 went on display at the Paris International Air Show. Some 650,000 visitors received details on the spacecraft and on Alan Shepard's suborbital flight before the display closed on June 4.
- Born: Tarsem Singh, Indian film director who has worked on films, music videos and commercials; in Jalandhar, Punjab, India

== May 27, 1961 (Saturday) ==
- Tunku Abdul Rahman, Prime Minister of Malaya, announced his proposal to form the "Federation of Malaysia", comprising Malaya, Singapore, Sarawak, Brunei and North Borneo (Sabah) into a single nation. Rahman spoke at a press conference in Singapore.
- American athlete Ralph Boston broke the long jump world record at Modesto, California, with a distance of 8.24 metres (27 feet 0 inches).
- Born: Northern Dancer, Canadian thoroughbred racehorse and winner of the 1964 Kentucky Derby and the Preakness Stakes; in Oshawa, Ontario (d. 1990)
- Died: Maria Fris, 29, Prima ballerina of the Hamburg State Opera, jumped to her death from a catwalk at the opera house between rehearsals for a production of Sergei Prokofiev's ballet of Romeo and Juliet. Fris had been despondent from a chronic tendon inflammation that had ruined her career.

== May 28, 1961 (Sunday) ==
- Peter Benenson's article "The Forgotten Prisoners", which inspired the founding of the human rights organization Amnesty International, was published in several internationally read newspapers.
- The Orient Express made its final run, traveling between Paris, France and Bucharest, Romania.

== May 29, 1961 (Monday) ==
- A West Virginia couple, Mr. and Mrs. Alderson Muncy of Paynesville, West Virginia, became the first American food stamp recipients under a pilot program of the U.S. Department of Agriculture, being tested in eight communities. For the month of June, the Muncys received $95 worth of food coupons for their household of fifteen people, and made the first purchase at Henderson's Supermarket.
- U.S. President John F. Kennedy formally petitioned the Interstate Commerce Commission to adopt "stringent regulations" prohibiting segregation in interstate bus travel. The proposed order, issued on September 22 and effective on November 1, removed Jim Crow signs in stations and ended segregation of waiting rooms, water fountains, and restrooms in interstate bus terminals later that same year, giving the Freedom Riders an unequivocal victory in their campaign.
- A centrifuge training program began at the Aviation Medical Acceleration Laboratory in Johnsville, Pennsylvania for the Mercury Seven astronauts, and would continue until June 30.

== May 30, 1961 (Tuesday) ==
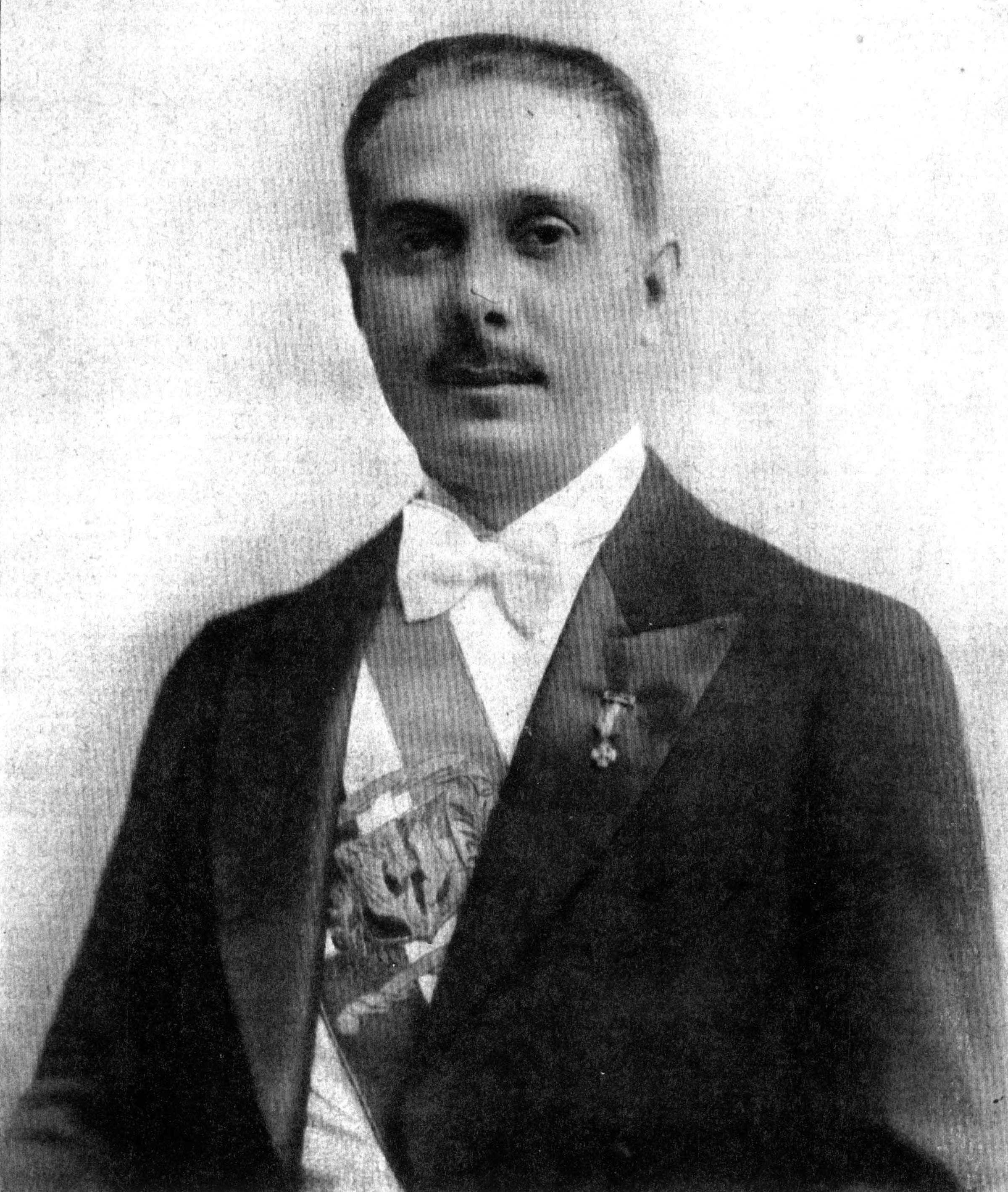
Rafael Trujillo

- Rafael Leónidas Trujillo, who had ruled the Dominican Republic since 1930, was assassinated in an ambush, putting an end to the second longest-running dictatorship in Latin American history. Trujillo was being driven in his car from his residence in San Cristobal to Ciudad Trujillo. Shortly after 10:00 p.m. local time, a sedan pulled into the path of his car, and assassins with machine guns killed both Trujillo and the chauffeur. The news was not announced to the nation's people until 5:00 p.m. the next day.
- All 61 people on KLM Flight 897 were killed when the DC-8 crashed at 1:19 in the morning, shortly after taking off from Lisbon in Portugal for a scheduled destination of Caracas in Venezuela. High winds and driving rains brought the DC-8 jet down into the ocean off of the coast of Portugal, and wreckage and bodies washed onto the beach.
- American driver A. J. Foyt won the 1961 Indianapolis 500, the first not to be included in the Formula One championship.
- Born: Ralph Carter, American stage and television actor known for Good Times; in New York City

== May 31, 1961 (Wednesday) ==
Republic of South Africa

- Following a 1960 referendum, the Union of South Africa became the Republic of South Africa and left the British Commonwealth of Nations, with former Governor-General Charles Robberts Swart as the first State President of South Africa.
- Trial opened in the Rokotov-Faibishenko case in Moscow City Court for foreign currency smugglers I. T. Rokotov, Vladislav Faibishenko, and seven other people. Rokotov and Faibishenko, originally sentenced to 15 years in prison, would be retried after a new law went into effect on July 1, providing for the death penalty. Both 22, they would be executed after their conviction on July 21.
- Presidents John F. Kennedy of the United States and Charles De Gaulle of France met in Paris. Making her first trip to Europe as First Lady, Jackie Kennedy charmed the crowds as she arrived for dinner at the Elysee Palace. Her new hairstyle, created by the Paris coiffeur Alexandre, made fashion news worldwide.
- In Switzerland, S.L. Benfica of Portugal won the European Cup, beating Spain's FC Barcelona (3–2) at Bern to become the champion club of European soccer football.
- In France, rebel generals Maurice Challe and André Zeller, captured soon after the Algiers putsch, were sentenced to 15 years in prison.
- Died: Roger Gavoury, 50, French National Police Commissioner of Algiers, was assassinated by the OAS, which was seeking to preserve French Algeria as a part of Metropolitan France. The killer invaded his apartment, then stabbed and beat Gavoury.
