= G. M. Palya =

Garakamanthapalya
- neighbourhood
- Location within Bengaluru
- Coordinates: 12.975205745213774°N 77.66607340318723°E
- Country: India
- State: Karnataka
- Metro: Bengaluru

Languages
  - Official: Kannada, English
- Time zone: UTC+5:30 (IST)
- PIN: 560075

Garakamanthana Palya or G. M. Palya is one of the neighbourhoods in Bengaluru. It is part of C. V. Raman Nagar Assembly constituency in East Bengaluru. It is named after Garakamantha (Jatayu, brother of Garuda, who fought with demon king Ravana). Kaggadasapura, Vignananagar, Basavanagar, Malleshpalya, BEML, LBS Nagar, Shivananda Nagar, Puttappa Layout, Byrasandra, Cauveri Colony, Krishnappa Gardeen, C. V. Raman Nagar, Vimanapura are the nearby localities.

== Location ==
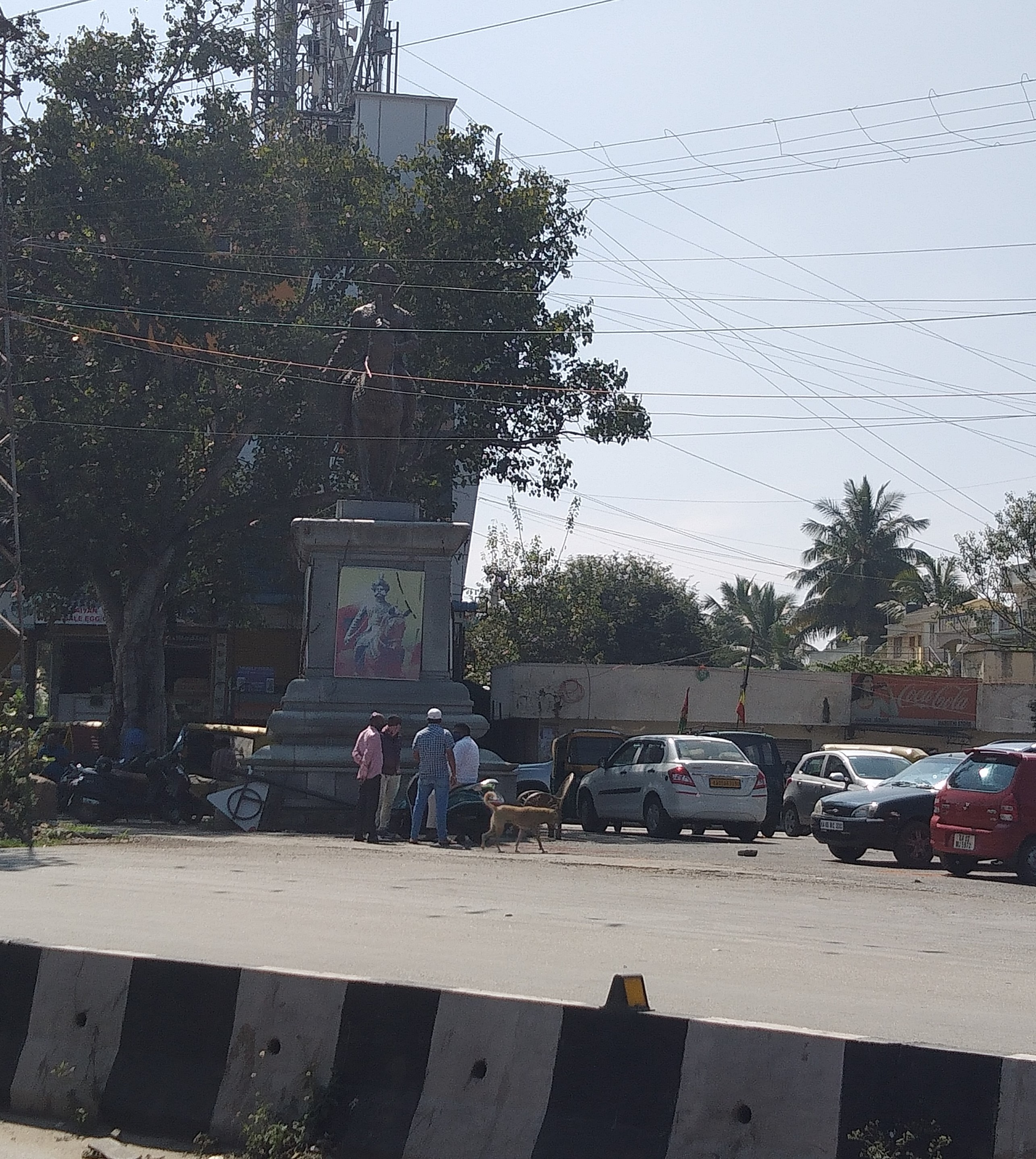
Kempe Gowda Circle, Suranjan Das Road and New Thippasandra/GM Palya Main Road JN

It is located east of Suranjan Das Road and connected by Suranjan Das Road, Namjoshi Road and Kaggadasapura Main Road.
