= June 1961 =

Month of 1961

<<	June 1961					>>
Su	Mo	Tu	We	Th	Fr	Sa
				1	2	3
4	5	6	7	8	9	10
11	12	13	14	15	16	17
18	19	20	21	22	23	24
25	26	27	28	29	30

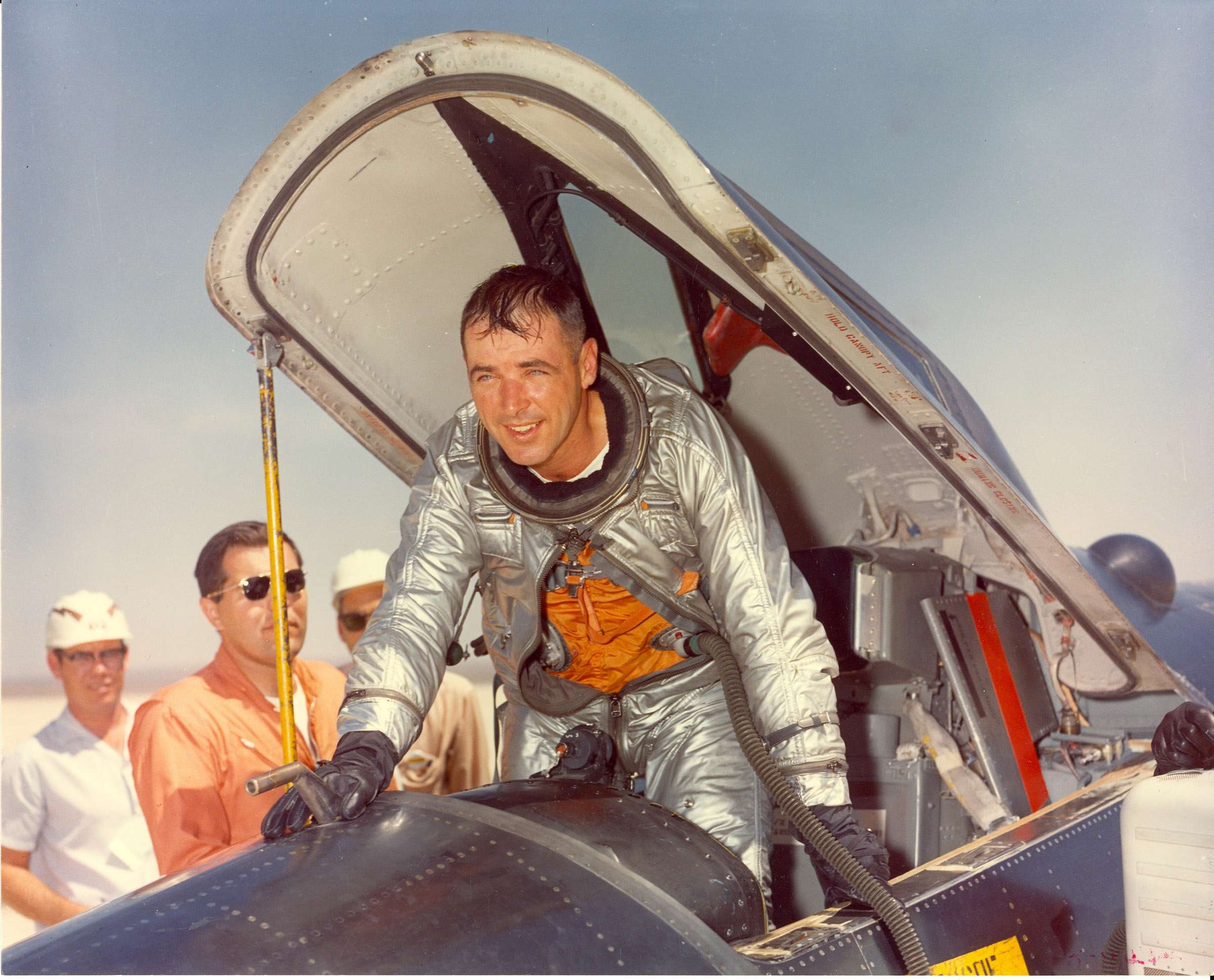
June 23, 1961: USAF Major Robert M. White becomes first pilot to fly a plane "a mile per second" (3,600 mph)

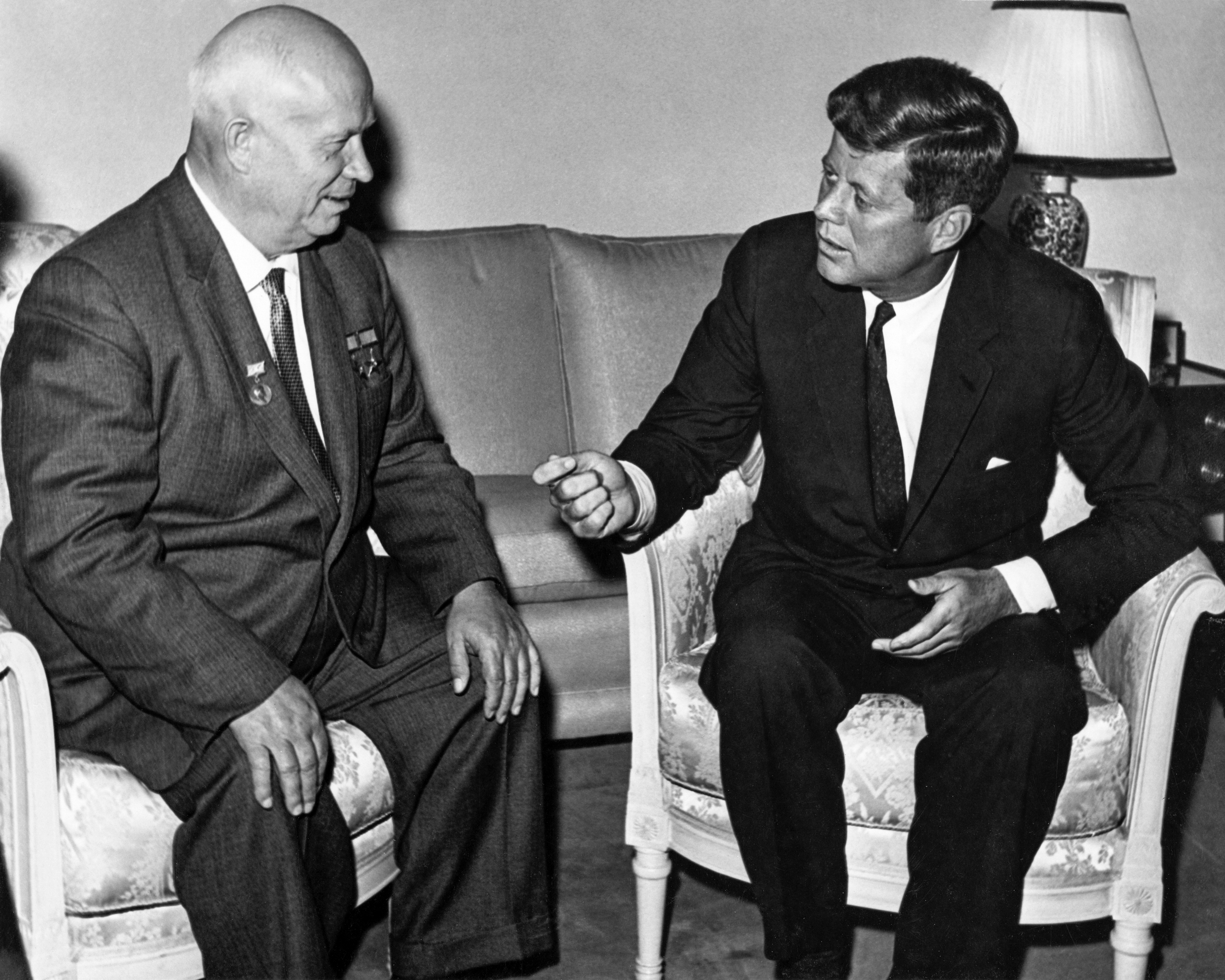
June 3, 1961: Soviet Premier Khrushchev and U.S. President Kennedy meet in Vienna

The following events occurred in June 1961:

== June 1, 1961 (Thursday) ==
- LAFTA, the Latin American Free Trade Association (known in its member nations as ALALC, the Asociacion Latino-Americana por la Libre Comerico) came into existence under the terms of the 1960 Treaty of Montevideo and consisted of all South American and Central American nations except for Panama.
- The Canadian Bank of Commerce and Imperial Bank of Canada merged to form the Canadian Imperial Bank of Commerce, in the largest bank merger in Canadian history.
- The birth control pill was introduced in West Germany, as Anovlar, developed by the Berlin pharmaceutical company Schering AG, became available for prescription.
- In the United States, WGFM of Schenectady, New York, on 99.5 MHz became the first radio station to broadcast FM stereo. The station is now WRVE.
- Capital Airlines, at the time the fifth largest carrier in the U.S., was acquired by United Airlines, making United the world's largest commercial airline.
- The northern part of the British Cameroons Trust Territory was incorporated into the Federation of Nigeria in accordance with a plebiscite.
- The Golden Knights were designated as the official demonstration and competition parachute team of the United States Army.
- Born: Yevgeny Prigozhin, Russian oligarch, mercenary chief, and restaurateur, founder of the Wagner Group, known for having attempted an uprising the Wagner Group rebellion on June 23, 2023, against Russian President Vladimir Putin; in Leningrad (died in jet crash, 2023)

== June 2, 1961 (Friday) ==
- J. Millard Tawes, Governor of Maryland, dedicated a granite and bronze monument in the grounds of the State House at Annapolis to the memory of the USS Maryland, nicknamed the "Fighting Mary", and her crew.
- SS Canberra, with room for 2,198 passengers and, at 45,270 gross tons, the largest British ocean liner to be built after World War II, departed Southampton on its maiden voyage, bound for Australia.
- Born: Liam Cunningham, Irish actor; in Dublin
- Died:
  - Mikhail Khrunichev, 60, Soviet space program director
  - George S. Kaufman, 71, American playwright

== June 3, 1961 (Saturday) ==
- The Vienna summit between U.S. President John F. Kennedy and Soviet Premier Nikita Khrushchev began in the capital of Austria, a neutral site. The two world leaders opened discussions with a 75-minute meeting at the U.S. Embassy in Austria. Although described in the press as "cordial", the first meeting between the young American president and the old Soviet leader was hostile, and Kennedy later described it to New York Times reporter James Reston as "the worst thing in my life", as Khrushchev lectured him and demanded that Western troops leave Berlin.
- Clarence Earl Gideon, a 50-year-old drifter, was arrested in Panama City, Florida, after being accused of burglary of the Bay Harbor Poolroom. Unable to afford an attorney, convicted and sentenced to five years in prison, Gideon filed his own petition for review in the United States Supreme Court. The Court's ruling in the landmark case of Gideon v. Wainwright established that state courts would be required to provide counsel for any criminal defendant unable to afford an attorney.
- Stirling Moss won the 1961 Silver City Trophy at Brands Hatch.
- Died: "G. I. Joe", 18, British war pigeon who was credited with saving the lives of 1,000 soldiers of the British 56th Infantry. On October 18, 1943, the division had taken control of the village of Calvi Vecchia in Italy, shortly before the RAF was preparing to make an air strike there. The pigeon flew 20 miles (32 km) to the airfield just as seven RAF bombers were preparing to depart, and the mission was aborted in time.

== June 4, 1961 (Sunday) ==
- On the second day of the Vienna summit, Premier Khrushchev informed President Kennedy that the Soviet Union would, in December, sign a separate peace treaty with East Germany whereby "all commitments stemming from Germany's surrender will become invalid", including the stationing of occupation forces in the city, precipitating what would become known as the Berlin Crisis. In that Berlin was entirely within East Germany, all American, British and French access to the city, including the corridors across East Germany between West Germany and Berlin. Khrushchev added that "it is up to the U.S. to decide whether there will be war or peace", that the Soviet decision to sign the treaty was "firm and irrevocable", and that the treaty would be signed in December. As noted in the memorandum made at the time, and released in 1998, "The President concluded the conversation by observing that it would be a cold winter."
- Died: Former Dominican Army General Juan Tomas Diaz, 52, who masterminded the assassination of Dominican Republic dictator Rafael Trujillo five days earlier, was killed in a gunbattle with security agents.

== June 5, 1961 (Monday) ==
- In separate 5–4 rulings, the United States Supreme Court upheld the constitutionality of the McCarran Act, requiring the Communist Party of the United States of America (CPUSA) to register the names of all of its members with the U.S. Justice Department (Communist Party v. Subversive Activities Control Board), and the Smith Act, which made active Communist Party membership a federal crime "if the individual is aware of the party's subversive goals" (Scales v. United States).
- Tony Castellitto, seen as a rival to Anthony Provenzano's leadership of the Teamsters Union Local 560 that served New York City, vanished after getting into a car with Provenzano's aide, Salvatore "Sally Bugs" Briguglio. "Tony Pro" was the chief suspect after Teamsters' Boss Jimmy Hoffa disappeared under similar circumstances on July 30, 1975. Provenzano was convicted in 1978 for Castellitto's murder, though Hoffa's killers were never found.
- Muhammad Shamte Hamadi became Chief Minister of Zanzibar.
- Born: Mary Kay Bergman, American voice actress and voice-over teacher; in Los Angeles (committed suicide, 1999)

== June 6, 1961 (Tuesday) ==
- South Korea's military leaders enacted the "Law Concerning Extraordinary Measures for National Reconstruction", replacing the legislative and executive branch with the "Supreme Council of National Reconstruction", consisting of 32 officers and chaired by Major General Park Chung Hee.
- Biomedical results of Mercury-Redstone 3 (MR-3), Alan Shepard's suborbital space flight, were reported in a Washington conference sponsored by NASA, the National Institute of Health, and the National Academy of Sciences.
- In the United Kingdom, the commercial television franchise for north and west Wales was awarded to Teledu Cymru, the Wales Television Association, and would go on the air on September 14, 1962. It failed in less than three years.
- The decennial census was taken in West Germany, and the final tally was that 56,174,826 people lived there. A census of East Germany had not been taken since 1950 (when it was 18,388,172), but by 1964, after the exodus of more than one million East Germans had been halted by the government, the population of the DDR would be recorded at 17,003,655.
- Born: Carole Baskin, American animal rights activist profiled in the documentary series Tiger King; as Carole Stairs Jones at Lackland Air Force Base in Bexar County, Texas
- Died: Carl Jung, 85, Swiss psychiatrist, died ten days after completing his work on the book Man and His Symbols.

== June 7, 1961 (Wednesday) ==
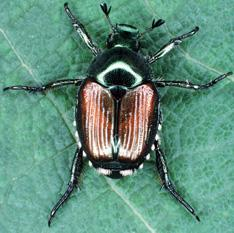
Japanese beetle

- California's war against the Japanese beetle (Popillia japonica) began with the discovery, by an entomologist, of one of the pests feeding on a flower on the grounds of the California State Capitol in Sacramento. It was soon discovered that an infestation was imminent. For the next four years, the state worked on preventing the beetles from becoming established, with the risk of hundreds of millions of dollars being lost if even 5% of California's fruit crops were destroyed. After four years, the beetle was declared eradicated.
- The Sony Corporation made its first public stock offering in the United States, with two million shares offered at $1.75 a share on Wall Street. Within two hours, all shares had been sold.
- The United States Navy ships USS Ulysses (ARB-9) and USS Diomedes (ARB-11) were transferred to West German ownership and renamed the Odin and the Wotan, respectively.

== June 8, 1961 (Thursday) ==
- A mob of 4,000 farmers seized control of the French town of Morlaix at dawn, blocking the roads in and around the 13,000-population town with tractors and trucks, occupying the city hall, and defying the town's 100-member police force. The Breton farmers were angry at the limits on the revenue they could receive from their products. The French Interior Ministry sent 130 riot police to disperse the group.

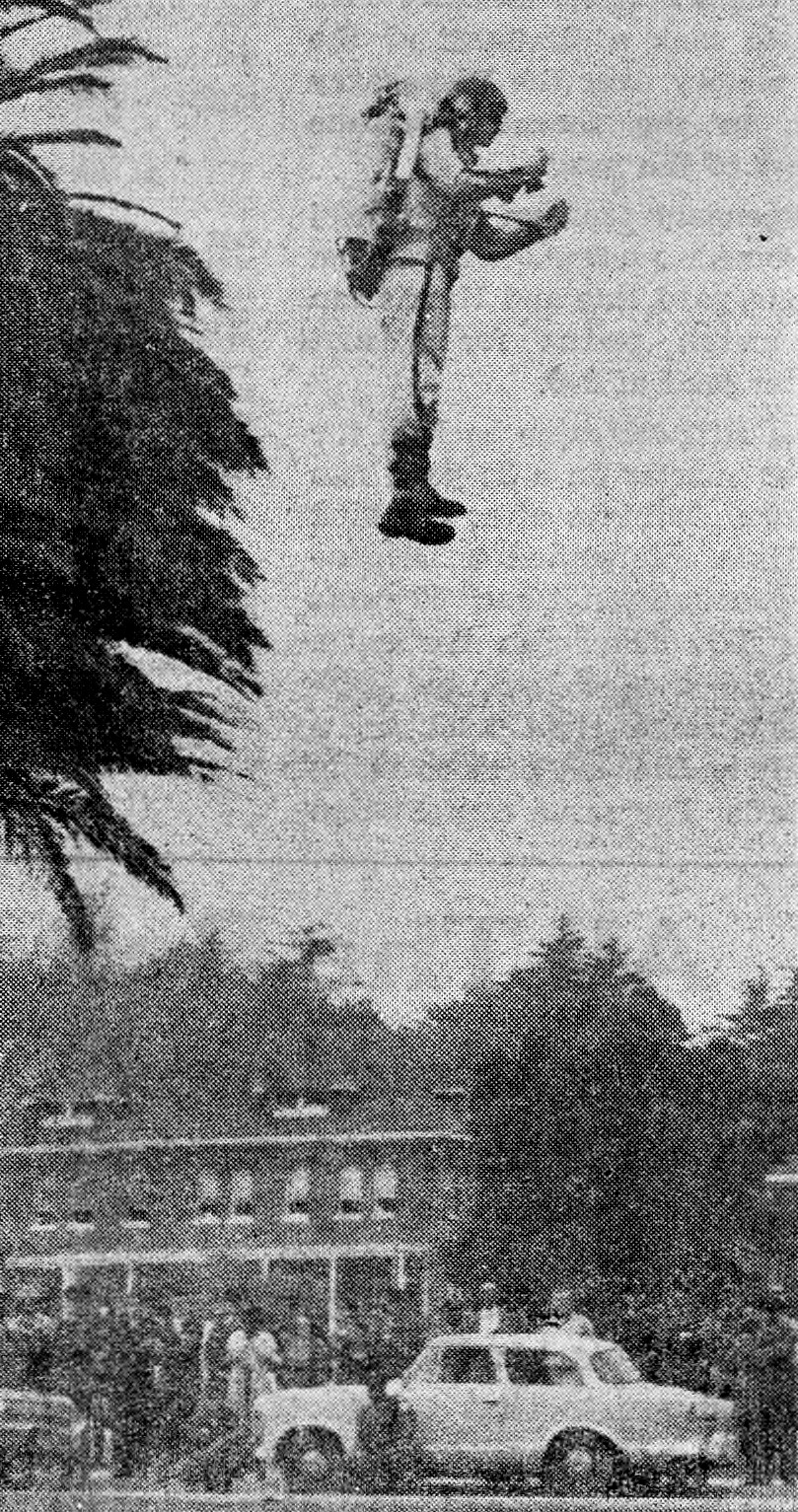
A "rocket belt" demonstration

- Bell Laboratories test pilot Harold Graham made the first public demonstration of a jet pack, flying the Bell Rocket Belt at Fort Eustis, Virginia, before a crowd of several hundred military officers and their guests. Impractical for use on Earth, jet pack technology would prove useful in orbital space missions.
- The Milwaukee Braves became the first team in Major League Baseball history to hit four consecutive home runs in one inning, as Eddie Mathews, Hank Aaron, Joe Adcock and Frank Thomas scored four home runs in four at-bats in the 7th inning against pitcher Jim Maloney of the Cincinnati Reds. The Reds (and Maloney) won anyway, 10–8. The feat would be duplicated twice in the next three years, on July 31, 1963 (Indians v. Angels) and May 2, 1964 (Twins v. A's); then not again for 40 years until September 18, 2006 (Dodgers v. Padres) and, most recently, on April 22, 2007 (Red Sox v. Yankees).
- The results of the 1961 population census of Great Britain were delivered to Parliament and showed the total population of the island to be 51,294,604 based on 43,430,972 in England, 5,223,000 in Scotland, and 2,640,632 in Wales.
- Ramón Mercader, who had served a 20-year prison sentence in Mexico for the August 20, 1940, assassination of Leon Trotsky, was awarded the honors of Hero of the Soviet Union and the Order of Lenin. The ceremony took place at the Kremlin in Moscow, and the medals were bestowed by Leonid Brezhnev.
- Prince Edward, Duke of Kent, the uncle of Queen Elizabeth II, married Katharine Worsley at York Minster. On the same day in London, Prince Vsevolod Ivanovich of Russia married Valli Knust, niece of German silent film star Valli Valli.
- Died: Olav Bjaaland, 88, Norwegian ski champion and Antarctic explorer

== June 9, 1961 (Friday) ==
- Jessie James Ferguson was executed in the electric chair in Louisiana, and on the same day, Nathaniel Lipscomb was put to death in the gas chamber in Maryland. These would be the last executions in either state for more than 20 years until the reinstatement of capital punishment in both. Robert Wayne Williams would be executed in Louisiana on December 14, 1983, and John Frederick Thanos in Maryland on May 17, 1994.
- United Nations Security Council Resolution 163 was adopted, calling on Portugal to act in accordance with the terms of General Assembly Resolution 1603 which declared Angola a Non-Self-Governing Territory.
- Bohuslav Martinů's opera The Greek Passion was performed for the first time, in Zürich.
- A proposed redesign by McDonnell Aircraft Corporation of the Mercury program space capsule was reviewed by NASA, featuring increased accessibility to controls, easier crew insertion and emergency evacuation, greater reliability, and adaptability to the proposed paraglide landing system. McDonnell's design increased retrorocket and posigrade rocket performance, placing most components outside the pressure vessel. NASA's Space Task Group was reluctant to adopt a complete redesign of the capsule, and would later ask McDonnell to study a minimum-modification capsule to provide an 18-orbit capability.
- Born:
  - Michael J. Fox, Canadian film and television actor; in Edmonton
  - Mark Goodier, BBC Radio DJ; in Salisbury, Rhodesia (now Harare, Zimbabwe)
  - Amy Denio, American jazz composer and musician; in Seattle
- Died:
  - Jeannie Gunn, 91, Australian novelist
  - Ernest Beaux, 79, French parfumier

== June 10, 1961 (Saturday) ==
- George York and James Latham, two U.S. Army privates who had gone AWOL from Fort Hood, Texas, were arrested in a roadblock west of Salt Lake City, bringing to an end a two-week killing spree that left seven random victims dead. They had strangled two women in Florida, shot an elderly man in Tennessee, beat two men to death the next day in Illinois, and shot a man in Kansas and a woman in Colorado before being caught. The two men were hanged on June 22, 1965, in Kansas.
- The Korean Central Intelligence Agency (KCIA), South Korea's secret police force, was created under the leadership of Colonel Kim Jong Pil, "explicitly designed to spy on its own citizens". Within three years, it had gone from having 3,000 employees on its payroll to 370,000 officials, agents and informers throughout the nation and abroad.
- The Soviet news agency TASS and the East German press service ADN released copies of two memoranda given by Soviet Premier Khrushchev to U.S. President Kennedy earlier in the week, confirming that the Soviets wanted all but "symbolic" troops to be withdrawn from West Berlin.
- Born: Maxi Priest (stage name for Max Elliott), Jamaican reggae singer; in Lewisham, London

== June 11, 1961 (Sunday) ==
- Olivier Gendebien of Belgium and Phil Hill of the United States won the 1961 24 Hours of Le Mans, setting a new event record, going almost 50 miles (80 km) farther in the allotted time than any previous team. Together, they drove 2,782.19 miles (4,477.50 km) at an average of 115.92 miles per hour (186.56 km/h).
- Norm Cash of the Detroit Tigers hit a home run out of the three-tier high Tiger Stadium. He would duplicate the feat three more times over the next two seasons, and, after retiring from baseball, would admit that he had cheated by "corking" his bat.
- The U.S. amusement park Ghost Town in the Sky was established on top of a 4,600-foot (1,400 m) high mountain at Maggie Valley, North Carolina.
- Italian cyclist Arnaldo Pambianco won the 1961 Giro d'Italia cycle race.

== June 12, 1961 (Monday) ==
- The "Night of Fire" took place in the Italian province of South Tyrol, inhabited by a substantial German-language speaking population. 37 electricity pylons were blown up by political protesters seeking autonomy for the region. Autonomy would be recognized in 1972 and expanded in 2001.
- Redstone launch vehicle No. 8 was delivered to Cape Canaveral for the suborbital Mercury 4 test flight that would make Gus Grissom the second American to travel into space on July 21.
- Born: Julius Kariuki, Kenyan Olympic gold medalist in 1988 in the 3000 metre steeplechase; in Nyahururu

== June 13, 1961 (Tuesday) ==
- The Space Task Group forwarded to NASA Headquarters the instrumentation system details for the Mercury-Scout mission, planned to check the operational effectiveness of the Mercury global tracking network.
- From June 13 to 25, approximately 750,000 visitors viewed the Freedom 7 Mercury spacecraft at the Rassegna International Electronic and Nuclear Fair at Rome, Italy.
- Yuri Gagarin laid the cornerstone of the Tsiolkovsky State Museum of the History of Cosmonautics. The museum, located in Kaluga, would open in 1967.

== June 14, 1961 (Wednesday) ==
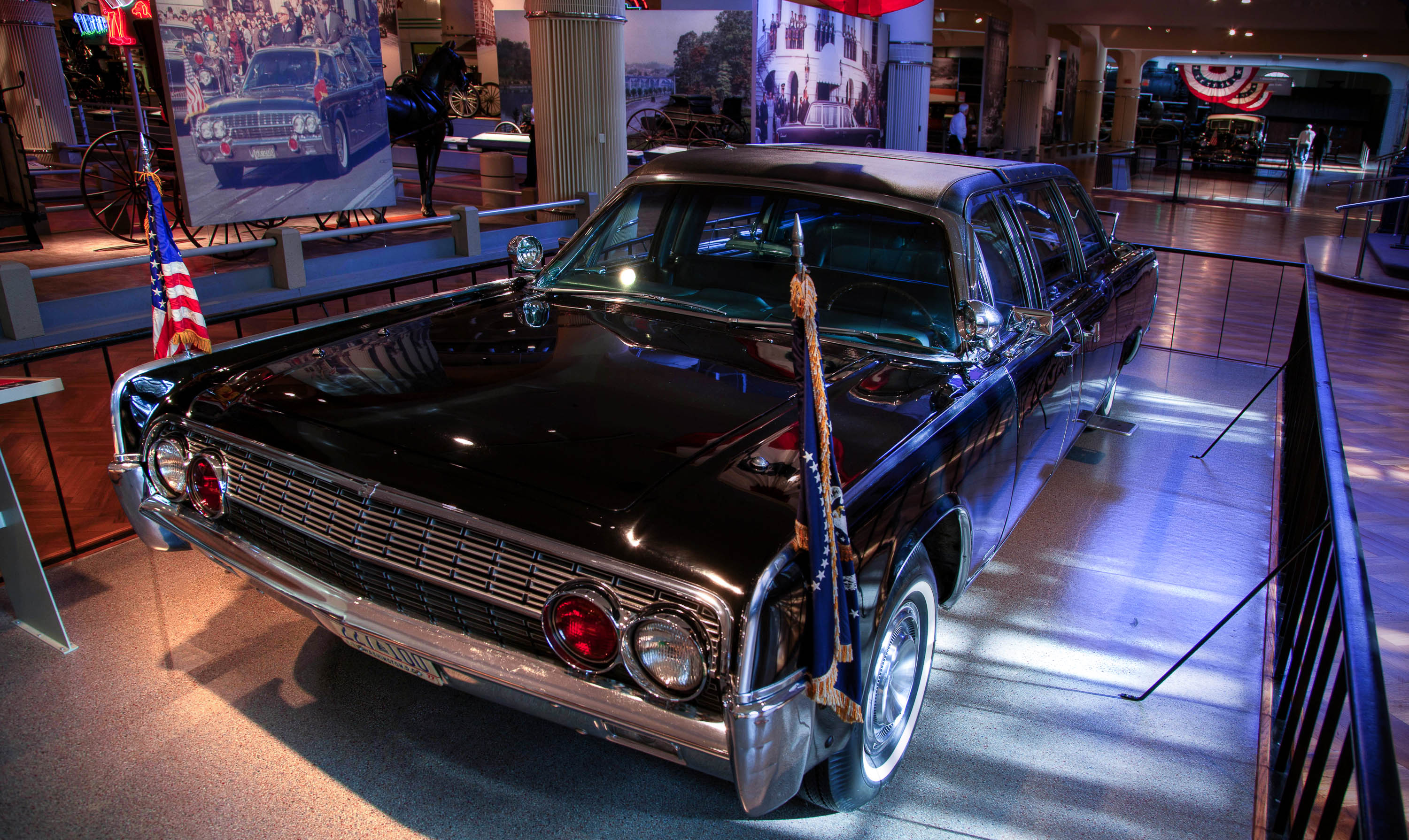
The President's convertible

- A custom-built 1961 Lincoln Continental convertible was delivered to the White House for use of President Kennedy. Kennedy would be assassinated in the car on November 22, 1963.
- American singer Patsy Cline and her brother, Sam, were involved in a head-on car collision on Old Hickory Boulevard in Nashville. The impact threw Cline into the windshield, nearly killing her.
- The British government unveiled new "panda" crossings with push button controls for pedestrians. The new crossings were set to appear on British roads the following year.
- Born: Boy George (stage name for George O'Dowd), British new wave singer for Culture Club; in Bexley, Kent

== June 15, 1961 (Thursday) ==
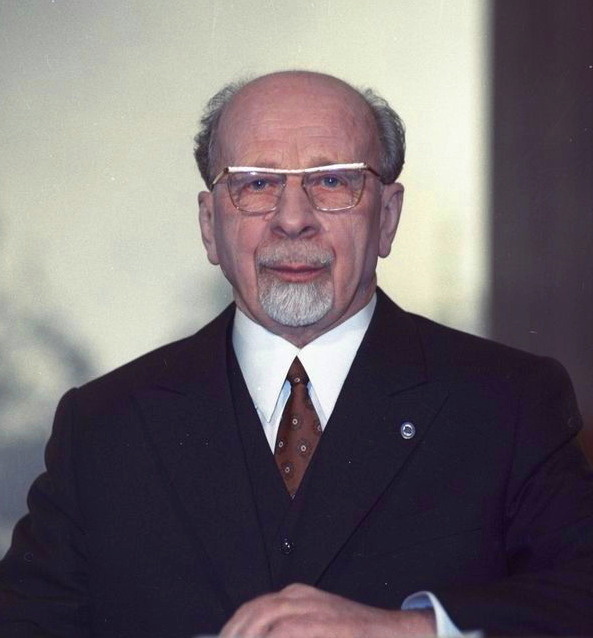
June 15, 1961: Ulbricht (photographed in 1970) says no wall will be built in Berlin

- At 11:00 a.m., Walter Ulbricht, State Council Chairman of East Germany, opened a rare press conference in East Berlin for Western journalists, restating the Communist demand that Berlin should be a "Free City". Reporter Annamarie Doherr of the Frankfurter Rundschau asked Ulbricht whether a boundary would be erected at the Brandenburg Gate. Ulbricht responded with the first reference to "die Mauer" (The Wall), "I understand by your question that there are men in West Germany who wish that we would mobilize the construction workers of the GDR in order to build a wall," and added, "No one has the intention of erecting a wall! ("Niemand hat die Absicht, eine Mauer zu errichten!"). Construction of the Berlin Wall would begin on August 13.
- Forty-five American civil rights activists, Freedom Riders who had been arrested on June 2 in Jackson, Mississippi, for protesting against segregation, were transferred from the crowded local jail to the Mississippi State Penitentiary in Parchman. Later that morning, two of the men, Felix Singer and Terry Sullivan, both white men from Chicago, were tortured with an electric cattle prod, in one of the first publicized uses of an electrified non-lethal weapon as a law enforcement device to control human beings. The 10,000-volt devices continued to be used throughout the 1960s. The story of the brutality at Parchman was reported worldwide after another of the protestors was released two weeks later.
- At the Jodrell Bank radio telescope, the search ceased for a Soviet Venus probe "lost" since February 1961, as visiting Soviet space scientists prepared to leave. The probe was last commanded on February 12.
- The Canadian Mathematical Bulletin received Joachim Lambek's paper "How to Program an Infinite Abacus", representing an important development in theoretical computer science.
- In Ethiopia, Emperor Haile Selassie inaugurated a new 226-metre (741 ft) long highway bridge over the river Abay near Bahir Dar.
- Born: Miguel "Angá" Díaz, Cuban percussionist; in San Juan y Martínez, Pinar del Río (d.2006)

== June 16, 1961 (Friday) ==
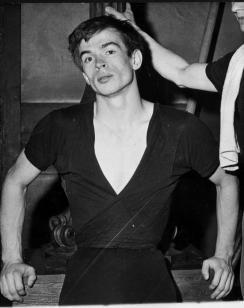
Nureyev

- The dance troupe of Russia's Kirov Ballet was at Le Bourget Airport and waiting to board a flight to London, when the star, dancer Rudolf Nureyev, was pulled aside by KGB agents and told that he was to take a 12:25 p.m. flight back to Moscow. Sensing that he would never be allowed to leave the Soviet Union again, Nureyev broke away from the escorts and ran over to two French airport policemen (who had been alerted by Nureyev's friend Clara Bichkova), shouting in English, "Protect me!" France granted the defecting Nureyev asylum.
- English motorcycle racer Ralph Rensen, 28, became the third rider in less than a week to be killed while competing in the Isle of Man TT series of races. The previous Saturday, Michael Brookes was fatally injured during practice, and on Monday, Marie Lambert was killed while riding in a sidecar during a race.
- An Ad Hoc Task Group reported to NASA the results of its studies to determine the main problems, the pacing items, and the major decisions required to accomplish the crewed lunar landing mission. The direct ascent method was studied intensively with much less attention given to the rendezvous method.
- Died: Marcel Junod, 57, Swiss physician and humanitarian

== June 17, 1961 (Saturday) ==
- The first President's Daily Brief, a top secret intelligence bulletin intended only for the view of the President of the United States, was published and delivered to John F. Kennedy under the title President's Intelligence Checklist. After the failure of the Bay of Pigs invasion, Kennedy had discarded the Central Intelligence Bulletin, which was limited to CIA findings. The daily briefing, compiled by a panel of representatives from all American government intelligence agencies, was renamed the National Intelligence Daily, then the Senior Executive Intelligence Brief, before becoming the "PDB".
- The first jet airplane manufactured in India, the HF-24 Marut, was flown for the first time, by Captain Suranjan Das.

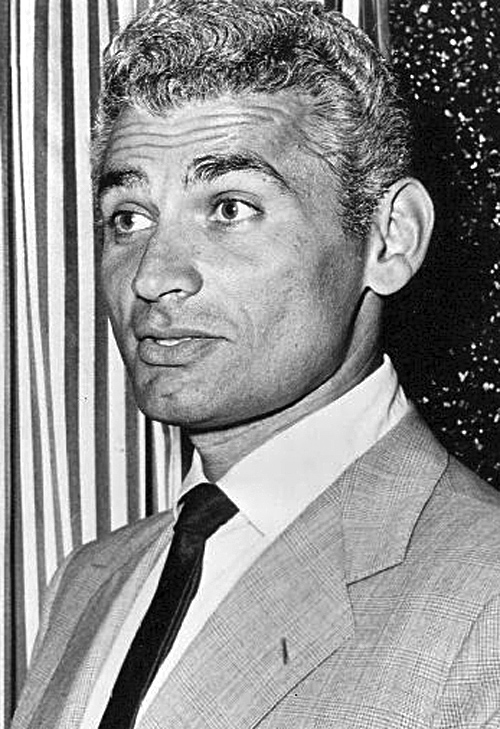
Chandler

- Died: Jeff Chandler, 42, American film star, died of complications from back surgery. Chandler had injured his back on April 15 while filming Merrill's Marauders and underwent surgery on May 13. Arterial damage caused by the operation led to a massive hemorrhage, requiring additional surgery on May 18. Chandler died from blood poisoning 30 days later. His physicians were sued for malpractice, a lawsuit settled months later for $233,358.

== June 18, 1961 (Sunday) ==
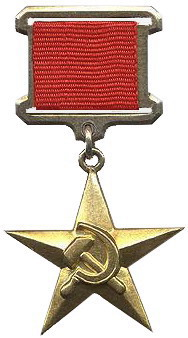
The "Hammer and Sickle medal" for Soviet Heroes of Socialist Labor"

- In the USSR, the Presidium of the Supreme Soviet awarded 7,026 honors to those associated with the flight of Vostok 1. Premier and Communist Party leader Nikita Khrushchev received the Order of Lenin and a third gold Hammer and Sickle Medal for "guiding the creation and development of the rocket industry, science and technology" which "opened up a new era in the conquest of space"; seven outstanding scientists and designers received a second Gold Hammer and Sickle Medal; 95 designers, officials and technicians received the title of Hero of Socialist Labor; and 6,924 workers, designers, scientists and technicians received various orders and medals (Order of Lenin, 478 persons; Order of the Red Banner of Labor, 1,218; Order of the Red Star, 256; Order of the Badge of Honor, 1,789; and medals to 3,183 other persons).
- The last episode of the radio version of Gunsmoke was broadcast. The show, which starred William Conrad as Marshal Matt Dillon and Georgia Ellis as Miss Kitty, ran on the CBS Radio Network on Sunday evenings at 6:30 and had debuted on April 26, 1952. The television show, which began in 1955 (with James Arness and Amanda Blake), continued on the CBS TV network until 1975.
- The Garabandal apparitions were first reported by four young girls in the Spanish village of San Sebastian de Garabandal, who said that the Archangel Michael had told them that the Blessed Virgin Mary would soon appear before them (which reportedly happened a week later on June 25). Reports of sightings would continue until 1965.
- Thirty-two passengers were killed and 153 injured when a bomb exploded on the Paris-to-Strasbourg express train as it approached Vitry-le-François. Ten coaches veered off the track, with several falling down a 45-foot (14 m) embankment into an adjoining ravine.
- American driver Phil Hill won the Belgian Grand Prix, finishing 0.7 seconds ahead of Wolfgang von Trips. First, second and third place were taken by Ferraris.
- Born:
  - Alison Moyet, English singer and vocalist for the synth-pop duo Yazoo; in Billericay
  - Andrés Galarraga, Venezuelan-born Major League Baseball star; in Caracas
- Died: Eddie Gaedel, 36, the shortest player in Major League Baseball history, died of injuries after being mugged. On August 19, 1951, the 3-foot-7-inch (1.09 m) Gaedel had appeared for the St. Louis Browns in a game against the Detroit Tigers, as a stunt for Browns' owner Bill Veeck.

== June 19, 1961 (Monday) ==
- By a 5–4 margin, the United States Supreme Court rendered the landmark decision of Mapp v. Ohio, holding that the admission, in a state criminal trial, of evidence obtained in an illegal search was a violation of the Fourth Amendment to the United States Constitution. Dollree Mapp had been arrested at her home in Shaker Heights, Ohio, on May 23, 1957, based on materials found without a warrant or probable cause. The decision resulted in the prospective exclusion of improperly obtained evidence from trials in the United States thereafter.
- With the exchange of diplomatic notes between Sir William Luce, the British Political Resident in the Persian Gulf, and Sheikh Abdullah III Al-Salim Al-Sabah, the Anglo-Kuwaiti Treaty of January 23, 1899, was terminated, the British protectorate over Kuwait (which provided for control of Kuwait's foreign affairs) came to an end, and Kuwait became an independent nation. Less than a week later, the existence of the State of Kuwait would be threatened by Iraq.

== June 20, 1961 (Tuesday) ==
- Hungary began the assimilation of its Romani minority (colloquially referred to as "gypsies") with the adoption of a resolution by the Politburo of the Hungarian Socialist Workers' Party, the East European nation's ruling Communist party. The Romani people were only 2% of Hungary's population but were increasing in number. The program was aimed at discouraging a separate Romani culture while improving public housing and education for the impoverished Romani, would continue until the downfall of Communism in 1989.
- Ten weeks into his war crimes trial in Israel, the prosecution having rested, accused German war criminal Adolf Eichmann took the witness stand in his own defense.

== June 21, 1961 (Wednesday) ==
- The first seawater desalinization plant in the United States, located near Freeport, Texas, was opened. At the White House, President Kennedy pushed a button to set in motion the process to convert salt water from the Gulf of Mexico into fresh water.
- As part of the Mercury-Atlas animal program, chimpanzees received training in acclimation to noise and vibration and to centrifuge runs at the University of Southern California. Two of the animals flew parabolas in a C-131 aircraft for weightlessness training which would continue until July 15.
- Syiah Kuala University was founded in Banda Aceh, Indonesia, by decree of the Indonesian Ministry of Education.
- The ATL-98 Carvair, created by Aviation Traders, made its first flight. Each of the 21 Carvairs, converted from a DC-4 airplane, were designed to carry up to five cars and 20 passengers by air.
- Born: Manu Chao, French folk singer; in Paris

== June 22, 1961 (Thursday) ==
- Meeting in Switzerland, the three rival princes of Laos reached an agreement to avoid further civil war and to create a representative "government of national union". Prime Minister Boun Oum, former premier Souvanna Phouma, and Pathet Lao leader (and future President) Prince Souphanouvong agreed in Zürich to ask King Savang Vatthana to select a new government.
- Deputy NASA Administrator Hugh Dryden sent a letter to U.S. Senator Robert S. Kerr, chair of the U.S. Senate Committee on Aeronautical and Space Sciences, outlining the broad scientific and technological gains to be achieved in landing a man on the Moon and returning him to Earth.
- Egypt's Al-Azhar University, a religious institution in operation for almost 1,000 years since the year 970, was nationalized by the terms of Law 103, approved by the National Assembly at the request of President Gamal Abdel Nasser.
- The Space Task Group advised the U.S. Navy of the recovery requirements for the upcoming Mercury 4 flight. On the same day, the Redstone rocket booster for Mercury 4 was erected on Pad 5 at Cape Canaveral.
- Former Katangan leader Moise Tshombe was released by the Congolese government for lack of evidence of any connection to the January murder of Congolese Premier Patrice Lumumba.
- Born: Stephen Batchelor, British field hockey player and 1988 Olympic gold medalist; in Beare Green, Surrey

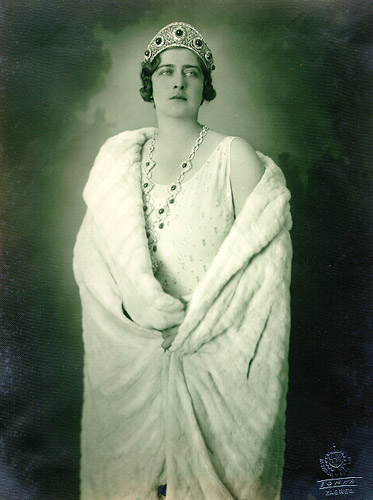
Queen Maria of Yugoslavia

- Died:
  - Queen Maria of Yugoslavia, 61, exiled member of royalty who had served as Queen Consort from 1922 until the assassination of her husband, King Alexander I, died in London.
  - Cheikh Raymond, 48, Jewish-Algerian singer was shot by assassins.

== June 23, 1961 (Friday) ==
- USAF Major Robert M. White became the first person to fly an airplane faster than one mile per second, or 3,600 miles per hour (5,800 km/h), and the first to pass Mach 5. White was piloting an X-15 over California after taking off from Edwards Air Force Base, and attained a maximum speed of 3,690 miles per hour (5,940 km/h). White, who on March 7 had been the first person to travel faster than Mach 4, would become the first to reach Mach 6, on November 9.
- The Antarctic Treaty came into effect, after being ratified simultaneously by Australia, Argentina and Chile. Those nations and nine others had signed the treaty on December 1, 1959.
- Born: Ian Duncan, Kenyan rally driver; in Limuru

== June 24, 1961 (Saturday) ==
- Twenty-seven years after it had first been introduced, in Europe, the Henry Miller novel Tropic of Cancer was released in the United States for the first time and distributed through Grove Press. Although the U.S. Justice Department and the U.S. Post Office had cleared the book (which included graphic descriptions of sexual intercourse) for sale, booksellers across the United States were threatened with prosecution for violating anti-obscenity laws. The U.S. Supreme Court would settle the issue in the 1964 case of Grove Press v. Gerstein.
- Modifications were made to the spacecraft designated for the second crewed suborbital Project Mercury flight. An observation window replaced two view ports and an improved manual control system was installed.
- Born:
  - Ralph E. Reed Jr., American Christian political activist; in Portsmouth, Virginia
  - Curt Smith, English singer for the pop rock band Tears for Fears
  - Konstantine Gamsakhurdia, Georgian politician; in Tbilisi
- Died: George Washington Vanderbilt III, 46, American philanthropist and heir to a $40,000,000 fortune, jumped to his death from the 10th floor of the Mark Hopkins Hotel in San Francisco.

== June 25, 1961 (Sunday) ==
- Iraqi prime minister Abdul Karim Kassem announced at a press conference his nation's intention to annex the tiny, but oil rich, kingdom of Kuwait, which had become an independent nation the previous week. Kassem told reporters that the takeover would be peaceful and that the Emir of Kuwait would be permitted to become the administrator of Iraq's new province. The basis of Iraq's claim was that both Iraq and Kuwait had both been part of the Ottoman Empire province of Basra, which had been partitioned in 1918. British troops moved into the area to defend against the chance of an Iraqi invasion, and Kassem rescinded his position on July 8.
- White supremacist George Lincoln Rockwell, accompanied by 20 of his followers in the American Nazi Party, appeared for "the first and last event to which [he] was invited as a speaker". Rockwell had been invited as a guest of black supremacist Elijah Muhammad to address a Chicago rally of the Nation of Islam, more commonly known as the Black Muslims. Malcolm X appeared as a speaker later in the program. The common link for both groups was a belief in separation of races.
- The Bill Evans Trio completed a two-week booking at The Village Vanguard in New York, with a live performance that was recorded for later release. This was the last time the trio would play together, as virtuoso bassist Scott LaFaro was killed in an auto accident 10 days later.
- Born: Ricky Gervais, English comedian, actor, writer, and producer; in Reading, Berkshire
- Died:
  - Miriam 'Ma' Ferguson, 86, American politician who was Governor of Texas from 1925 to 1927 and again from 1933 to 1935. Ferguson was only the second woman in history to be inaugurated as Governor of an American state.
  - Douglas McCurdy, 74, Canadian aviator and former Lieutenant Governor of Nova Scotia

== June 26, 1961 (Monday) ==
- Nelson Mandela, an African National Congress leader who had gone into hiding in South Africa to avoid arrest, issued the manifesto "The Struggle Is My Life", signaling that the ANC leaders had not fled the country, and changing tactics from passive resistance to armed struggle. A militant wing of the ANC, Umkhonto we Sizwe ("Spear of the Nation"), was founded as part of the new direction.
- Ernest Hemingway was released from hospitalization for the last time, after spending two months at the psychiatric hospital at the Mayo Clinic for suicidal behavior. The renowned author would shoot himself six days later.
- Died: Hélène Dutrieu, 83, Belgian aviator who set several records in the early days of airplane flying

== June 27, 1961 (Tuesday) ==
- The Reverend Arthur Michael Ramsey was enthroned as the 100th Archbishop of Canterbury and Primate of All England, the highest ranking prelate in the Church of England. After taking the oath of office at the Cathedral in Canterbury, Ramsey took his seat in the Ancient Throne of St. Augustine, a marble chair constructed in the year 1205, and named for St. Augustine of Canterbury, who is considered to have been the first Archbishop, serving from 598 to 601.
- Born: Meera Syal, British-Indian actress and comedian; in Wolverhampton
- Died: Mukhtar Auezov, 63, Kazakh dramatist

== June 28, 1961 (Wednesday) ==
- President Kennedy issued National Security Action Memorandum (NSAM) 55, entitled "Relations of the Joint Chiefs of Staff to the President in Cold War Operations". NSAM-55, along with memoranda #56 and #57, transferred responsibility for planning of U.S. paramilitary operations in peacetime from the CIA to the Joint Chiefs of Staff. The directives, proposed by General Maxwell D. Taylor following the failure of the Bay of Pigs Invasion, were so secret that copies were not released to either the CIA or to the U.S. Department of State.
- Using Mercury spacecraft No. 5, a spacecraft seaworthiness test was conducted 65 miles (105 km) east of Wallops Island. Sea conditions varied with 2-foot (0.61 m) to 4-foot (1.2 m) ground swells and wave heights of from 1 foot (0.30 m) to 2 feet (0.61 m), and spacecraft flotation resulte were found to be satisfactory.
- Born:
  - Mike Lindell, also known as "the My Pillow Guy", American businessman, political activist and founder and CEO of My Pillow; in Mankato, Minnesota
  - Kurt Eichenwald, American investigative reporter; in New York City
- Died: Huw Menai, 74, Welsh poet

== June 29, 1961 (Thursday) ==
- The "first in-orbit break-up event in space history" took place at 06:08:10 UTC, when the upper stage of an American Thor-Able rocket exploded into 298 fragments at an orbital altitude of roughly 600 miles (970 km). The launch marked the first three-satellite payload lifted into space: the Transit 4A navigational satellite, which was the first nuclear-powered device in orbit, with energy supplied by the Systems for Nuclear Auxiliary Power (SNAP) system, powered by the isotope plutonium-238; the Injun I, "the first university-built satellite", designed to gather information on the Earth's radiation belts; and the second Galactic Radiation and Background satellite (GRAB 2), which measured stellar radiation, but also served as a spy satellite.
- You Bet Your Life, a thirty-minute game show hosted by comedian Groucho Marx, was broadcast for the last time on television, at 10:00 p.m. After starting on CBS Radio in 1947, it had an eleven-season run on NBC from 1950 onward.
- A two-day inspection of Atlas launch vehicle 88-D, designated for Gus Grissom's upcoming Mercury 4 mission, began at the Convair factory following completion of the rocket. By then, the number of Space Task Group personnel was only six short of reaching 800.

== June 30, 1961 (Friday) ==
- In a pivotal event in the history of professional wrestling, a record crowd of 38,622 fans turned out to Chicago's Comiskey Park. Buddy Rogers defeated reigning National Wrestling Alliance champion Pat O'Connor for the NWA Worlds Heavyweight Championship.
- Kuwait requested the assistance of British forces to protect it from possible invasion by Iraq. The next day, an initial contingent of 600 soldiers was dispatched. Kuwait applied for United Nations membership on the same day.
- The Value Line Composite Index, a weighted measure of the value of individual stocks traded on the various exchanges in the United States, was inaugurated.
- Ernest Hemingway returned to his home in Ketchum, Idaho, after treatment at the Mayo Clinic. Two days later, he committed suicide.
- The 1961 Australian Census was taken and showed a population that day of 5,333,179.
- Died: Lee de Forest, 87, American inventor whose creation of the Audion vacuum tube in 1908 revolutionized electronics and radio broadcasting. Despite patenting over 300 inventions, DeForest did not attempt to recover royalties, and left an estate of only $1,250.
