= Suranjan Das Road =

Road in Bengaluru, India

Coordinates: 12.975018609601308°N 77.65643947257523°E

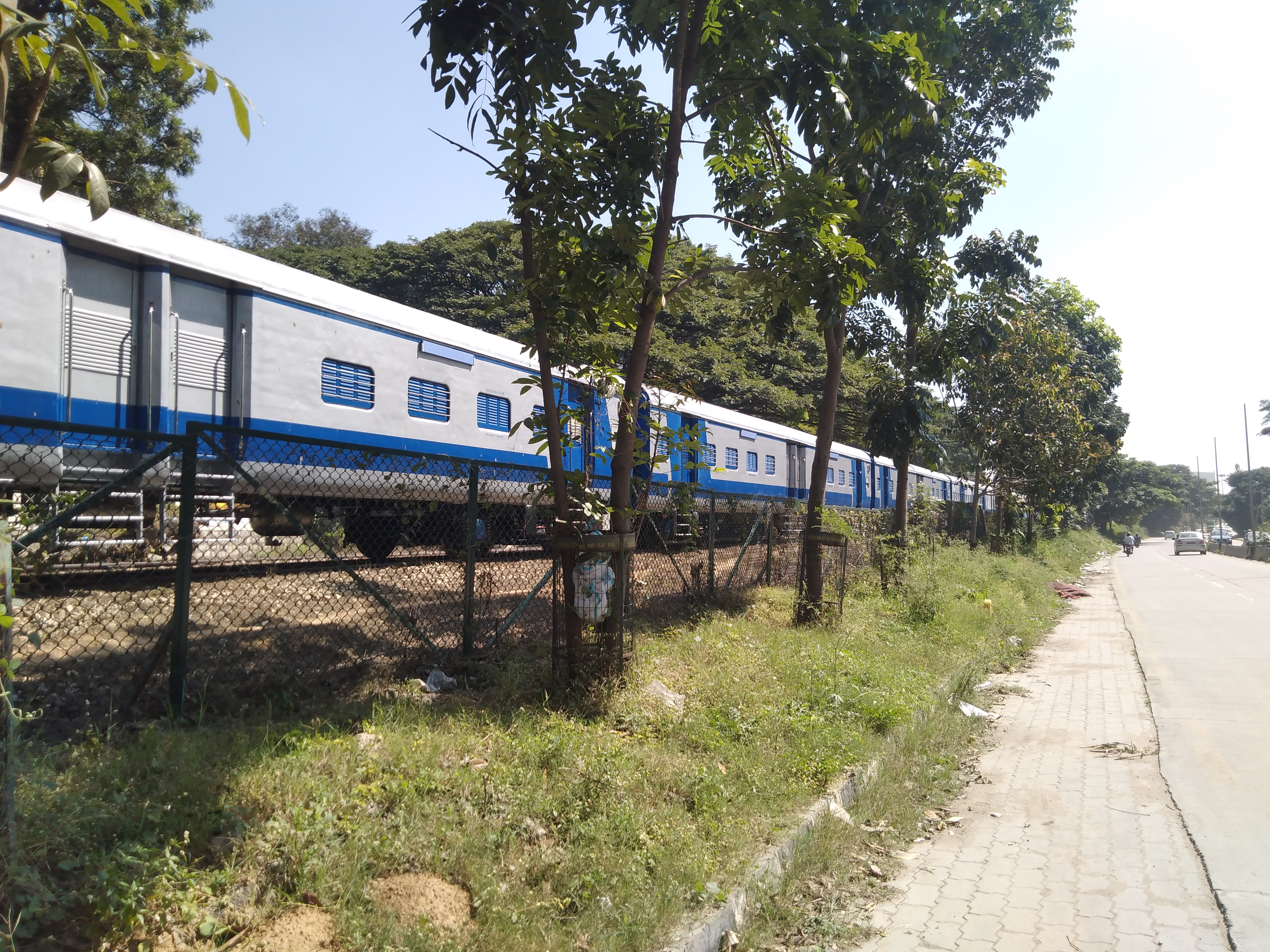
MEMU Rakes built by BEML parked parallel to Suranjan Das Road

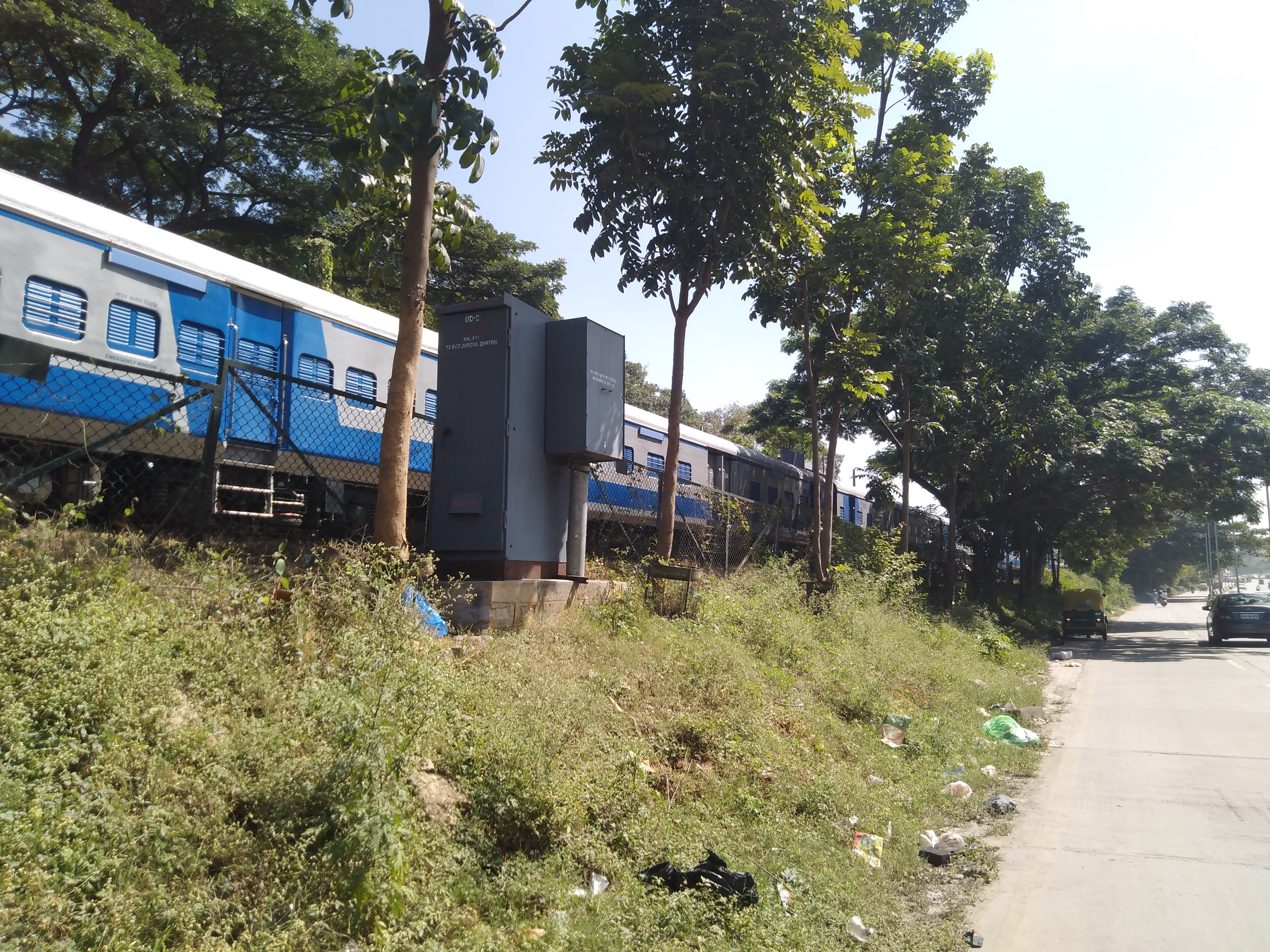
MEMU Rakes belonging to Central Railway parked adjacent to Suranjan Das Road

Suranjan Das Road is a road in Bengaluru, India. It runs from Old Madras Road at one end to Old Airport Road at the other.

== History ==
The road was built in the 1940s to connect Old Airport Road and Old Madras Road.

== Etymology ==
The road is named after Group Captain Suranjan Das, a test pilot who is considered one of the pioneers of Indian aviation. He joined the No 8 Fighter-Bomber Squadron in 1943 and was known to be adept in solving technical snags. He also participated in operations in Kashmir in 1947–48. It was 1949 that sparked off his life-long connection with Bengaluru. Having acquired training from the Empire Test Pilot School in the UK, Das was instrumental in testing the Hindustan Trainer-2 (HT-2) at Hindustan Aeronautics (HAL). Das was killed on January 10, 1970 when the HF-24 Mk. IR prototype he was flying crashed. A number of causes were attributed, including the failure of reheat mode of one of the engines and the inadvertent opening of the canopy during the takeoff.

== Road widening ==
Linking the very busy Old Madras Road and Old Airport Road, Suranjan Das Road was planned to be widened in 2006, earlier than most other roads in Bengaluru then. The actual widening work began only in 2012. That said, the road remained unfinished till 2014, causing inconvenience to many commuters on the route.

In the course of this widening initiative,183 trees were uprooted to make room for additional lanes. This caused local residents to be unhappy, since they claimed that the green canopy provided by the side of the road was lost forever.

== Location ==
BM Kaval, ADE, New Thippasandra, Jeevanbimanagar are the localities situated to the West of the Road. Suggaguntepalya, BEML, Vimanapura, GM Palya are located to the East.
