= CV Raman Nagar =

- neighborhood
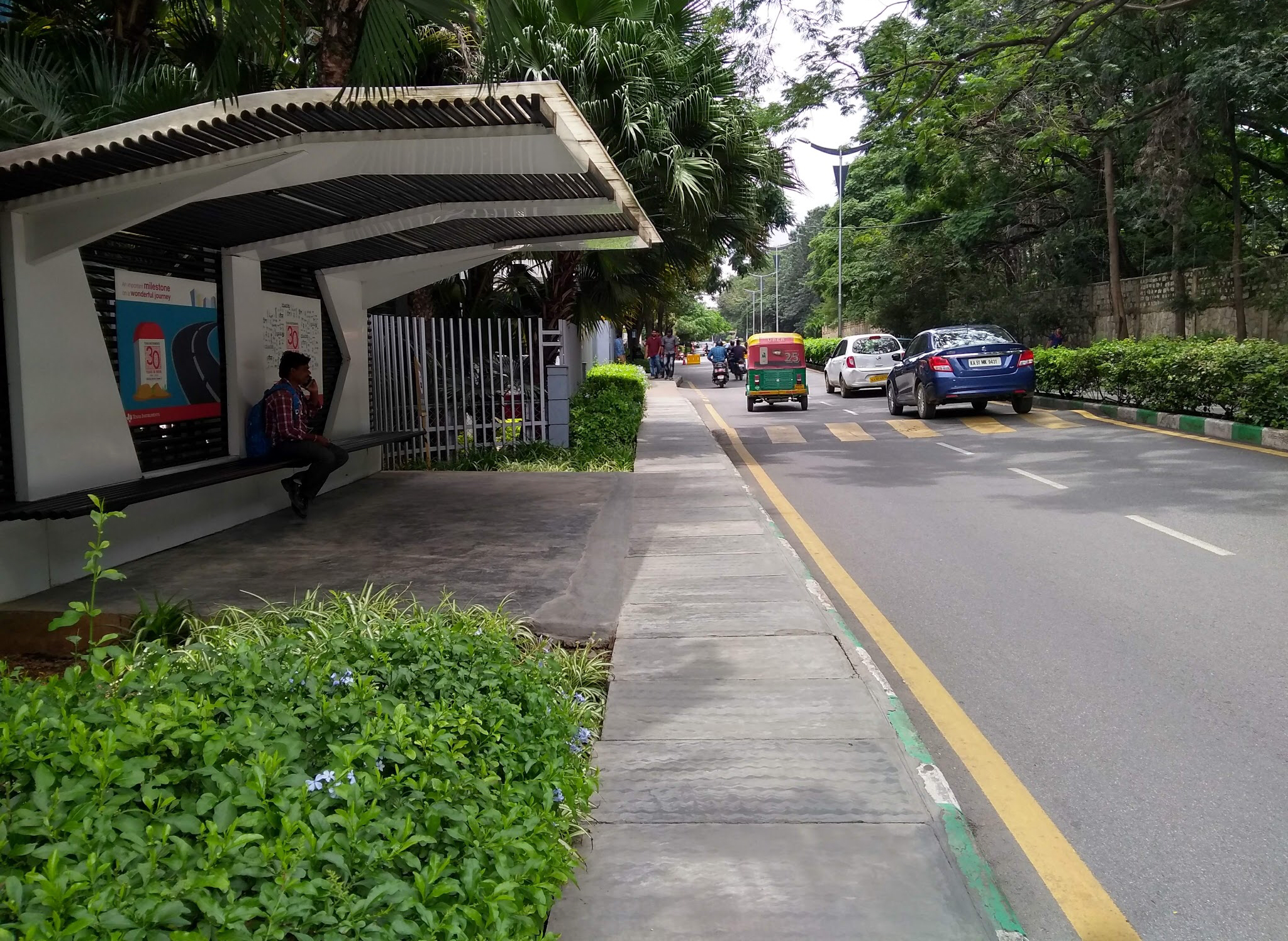

- Location within Bengaluru
- Coordinates: 12°59′8″N 77°39′50″E
- Country: India
- State: Karnataka
- Metro: Bengaluru

Languages
  - Official: Kannada
- Time zone: UTC+5:30 (IST)
- PIN: 560093
- Vehicle registration: KA-53

CV Raman Nagar is a neighbourhood located in the eastern part of the city of Bangalore. It is at a distance of 13 km from Majestic. It is bounded by Indiranagar, Kaggadasapura and Baiyappanahalli. It is an upmarket area and also known as Greater Indiranagar.

The locality is named after C. V. Raman, a scientist who lived in Bangalore. The Bagmane Tech Park is located here.

On Thursday, 15 April 2010, a road located in the boundary of CV Raman Nagar, was named after India's former president, Dr. A.P.J. Abdul Kalam. The road runs through D.R.D.O. township where the Chief Controller of D.R.D.O., Eloangovan, completed formalities of naming of the road, in the presence of various dignitaries from the defence organisation.
