= Suranjan Das =

Indian Air Force Pilot

- Born: 22 February 1920; Calcutta, Bengal Presidency, British India (present day Kolkata, West Bengal, India)
- Died: 10 January 1970 (aged 49)
- Spouse: Veronica Loveless
- Military career
- Allegiance: British India; India
- Branch: Royal Indian Air Force; Indian Air Force
- Service years: 1942–1970
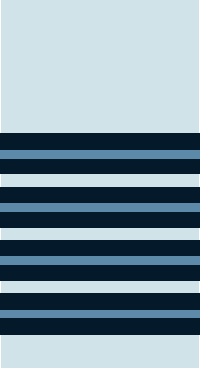
- Rank: Group Captain
- Service number: no
- Unit: No. 3 Squadron IAF
- Commands: Halwara Air Force Station
- Awards: Padma Vibhushan; Ati Vishisht Seva Medal; Vayusena Medal

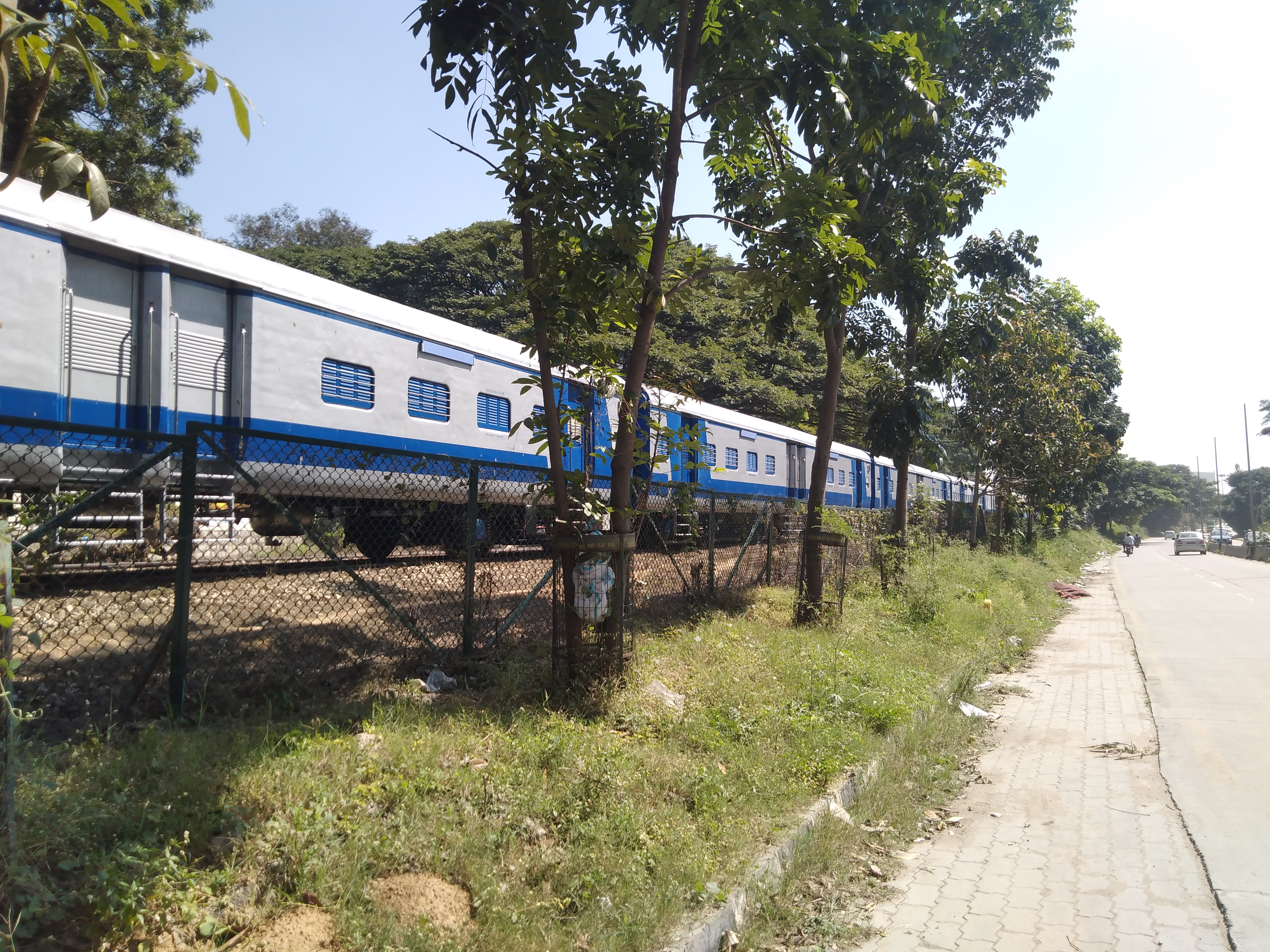
MEMU Rakes built by BEML parked parallel to Suranjan Das Road

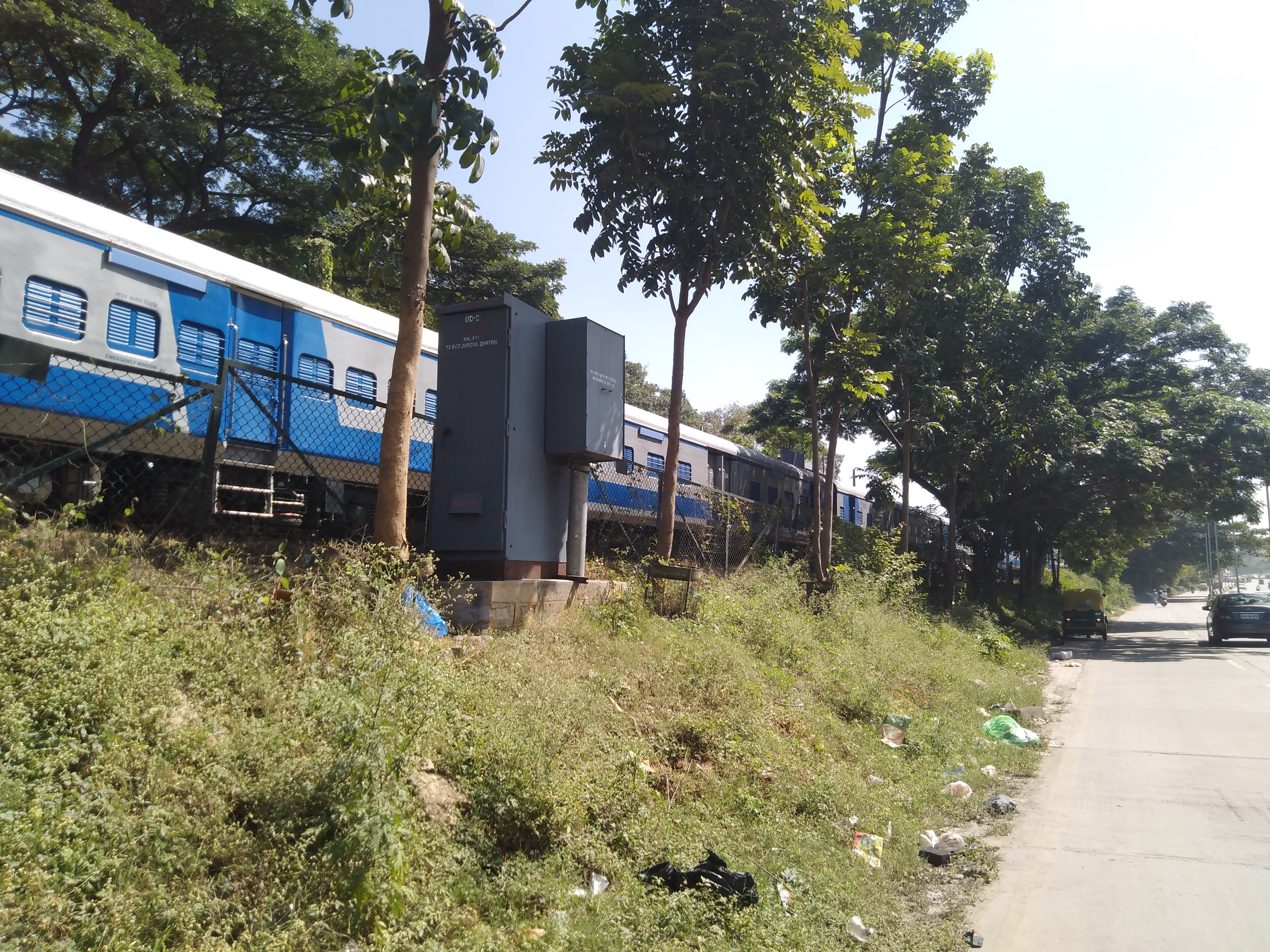
MEMU Rakes belonging to Central Railway parked adjacent to Suranjan Das Road

Suranjan Das (22 February 1920 – 10 January 1970) was a pilot in the Indian Air Force. He joined the Royal Indian Air Force during the Second World War and was among the first pilots to be sent to Empire Test Pilots School to a test pilot for the Indian Air Force. He was a group captain. He commanded the Halwara Air Force Station Base between 1967 and 1969 and was the director of the Aircraft & Armament Testing Group of the Indian Air Force from 1969 until his death. He was awarded the Padma Vibhushan posthumously in 1970. He was the son of Sudhi Ranjan Das. He died in an air crash while test flying a HAL HF-24 prototype.

The 4.1-km stretch of the road connecting Old Madras Road and Old Airport Road, Bangalore, is named Suranjan Das Road after him.
