= Mukerjee (Yebaw Phyu Win) =

Burmese communist leader

- ရဲဘော် ဖြူဝင်း
- Born: Chittagong, Bengal
- Died: 7 May 1961
- Occupation: Politician
- Political party: Communist Party of Burma

Mukerjee, party name Yebaw Phyu Win (Burmese: ရဲဘော်ဖြူဝင်း), was a Bengal-born Burmese communist leader. Ahead of the Second World War, he took employment in the Defence Department. In 1939 he joined the Burmese Communist Party. In 1946, he was included in the leadership of the All Burma Trade Union Congress.

In 1948 he was imprisoned along with Bo Yan Aung. However, he managed to escape from jail. In 1949 he went underground. In 1955 he was included in the Central Committee of the Burmese Communist Party and put in-charge of the North-Western Military Zone.

== Death ==
On May 7, 1961 he was killed in a police raid.
