= Kaggadasapura =

Coordinates: 12°58′45.7″N 77°40′25.4″E

Kaggadaspura
- Neighbourhood
- Interactive map of Kaggadaspura
- Country: India
- State or Union Territory: Karnataka
- City: Bangalore

Kaggadasapura, also known as Upper Indiranagar, is a relatively new area located near DRDO township in CV Raman Nagar, Bangalore, India. Kaggadasapura is an area in Bangalore, and has many apartment complexes. It is located at the coordinates: 12°59'0"N, 77°40'32"E. It is about 4 km from Indiranagar and old (HAL) Airport Road in Bangalore. Defence Avionics Research Establishment (DARE), Center for Artificial Intelligence Research (CAIR) and DRDO Phase II are located at Kaggadasapura.

== Overview ==
DRDO Phase II has several residential complexes for the DRDO employees. The earlier residents are the Kannada and Telugu speaking people from the old village of Kaggadasapura, and the rest are from various states, primarily employed in the neighbouring IT parks (Bagmane Tech Park, Embassy Golf Links Business Park, ITPB etc.) and a few in the government defence laboratories, such as, DRDO, BEML, DARE, CAIR, ADE, ADA, GTRE, LRDE, etc. Kaggadasapura Residents Welfare Association has been formed recently.

It comes under the ward number 57 of the BBMP and the registration of property, marriage, etc. in this area is managed by the BBMP office in Krishnarajapuram. A new BBMP Contact Point has been opened just outside Kaggadasapura Government Primary School in 19th cross Kaggadasapura. Electorally, it is under the CV Raman Nagar assembly constituency (number 161, for Vidhana Soudha) and Bangalore Central Loksabha constituency. P.C.Mohan represents Bangalore Central constituency at the Parliament. S Raghu represents as the member of CV Raman Nagar assembly constituency

== Transport ==
The neighbourhood has many schools in the neighbourhood including National Centre for Excellence, Geethanjali Vidyalaya and Sishya BEML. It is very close to KR Puram Railway Station. The Baiyppanahalli metro station is less than 5 km from Kaggadasapura. There are several libraries for adults & children in this area.
