= August 1961 =

Month of 1961

<<	August 1961					>>
Su	Mo	Tu	We	Th	Fr	Sa
		1	2	3	4	5
6	7	8	9	10	11	12
13	14	15	16	17	18	19
20	21	22	23	24	25	26
27	28	29	30	31

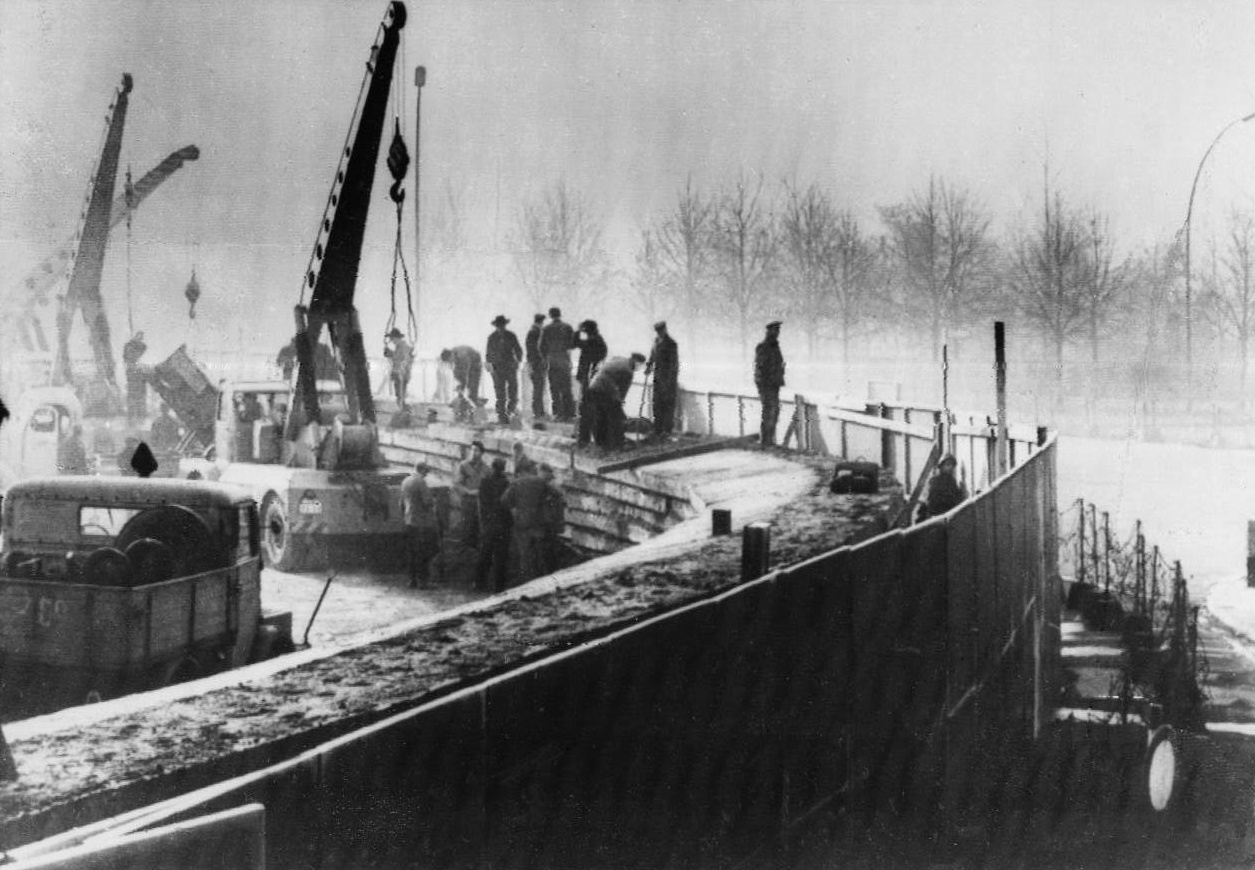
August 13, 1961: Wall erected to divide East Berlin from West Berlin

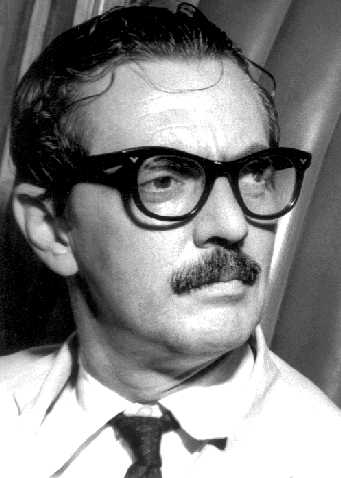
August 25, 1961: Brazil President Jânio Quadros resigns unexpectedly, Brazil's Congress accepts unexpectedly

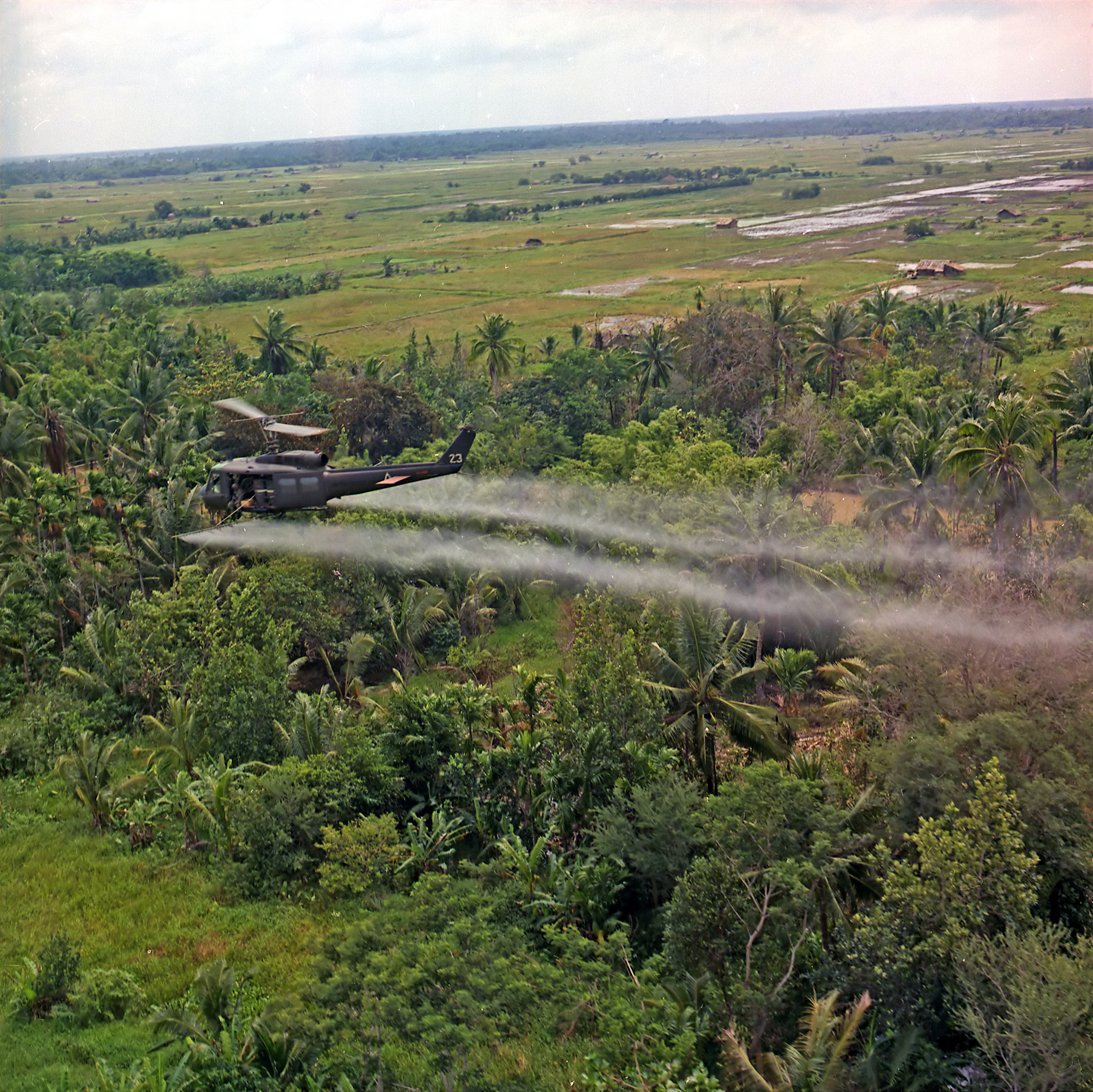
August 10, 1961: Chemical defoilant spraying begins in Vietnam

The following events happened in August 1961:

== August 1, 1961 (Tuesday) ==
- U.S. Secretary of Defense Robert McNamara issued DOD Directive 5105.21, ordering the creation of the Defense Intelligence Agency.
- Three days of testing of the seaworthiness characteristics of the operational Mercury capsule began.
- Born:
  - Peter Evans, Australian Olympic swimming champion; in Perth
  - Danny Blind, Dutch footballer and coach; in Oost-Souburg

== August 2, 1961 (Wednesday) ==
- Sixteen foreign tourists drowned in Switzerland's Lake Lucerne after their tour bus was sideswiped by a truck, then plunged down an embankment into the lake, near Hergiswil. There were 22 survivors, including the driver, the tour conductor, and his wife. All of the dead were Americans, and all but two were women. Most were schoolteachers who had been on a European trip organized by Gateway Holiday Tours of New York.
- Cyrille Adoula became the new Prime Minister of the Democratic Republic of the Congo after his nomination by President Joseph Kasavubu was confirmed by the parliament in a closed session in Leopoldville (now Kinshasa).
- Born: Cui Jian, Korean Chinese singer-songwriter; in Beijing
- Died: Michael John O'Leary, 70, Irish winner of the Victoria Cross for valor during World War I

== August 3, 1961 (Thursday) ==
- In the United Kingdom, the Suicide Act 1961 was given royal assent and took effect immediately in England and in Wales, removing any criminal penalties previously assessed against people who had unsuccessfully attempted suicide.
- The nuclear-powered submarine USS Thresher was commissioned at the Portsmouth, New Hampshire Naval Shipyard. On April 10, 1963, the Thresher would be lost along with all 129 of its crew during deep diving tests.
- In the UK, the Trustee Investments Act 1961 received royal assent.
- Born:
  - Nicola Jane Chapman, British disability activist and sufferer of brittle bone disease, who was appointed, as Baroness Chapman, to the House of Lords in 2004 as one of the "People's peers"; in Leeds (died from pneumonia, 2009)
  - Art Porter Jr., American jazz saxophonist; in Little Rock, Arkansas (died from drowning, 1996)
- Died:
  - Nicola Canali, 87, Italian Roman Catholic cardinal who was the first President of the Pontifical Commission for Vatican City State from 1931 until his death.
  - Zoltán Tildy, 71, last Prime Minister of the Kingdom of Hungary (1945–1946) and first President of Hungary (1946–1948).

== August 4, 1961 (Friday) ==
- Nikita Khrushchev, leader of the Soviet Union, made a "secret" speech at the Conference of first secretaries of Central Committees of Communist and workers parties of socialist countries for the exchange of views on the questions related to preparation and conclusion of a German peace treaty. Describing his encounter with U.S. envoy John J. McCloy, he said, "I told him to let Kennedy know... that if he starts a war then he would probably become the last president of the United States of America."
- Clarence Earl Gideon, charged with burglary, represented himself at his criminal trial after his request for an attorney was denied. After being sentenced on August 25 to five years in prison, Gideon petitioned the United States Supreme Court for review of his conviction, citing the Sixth Amendment to the United States Constitution.

Barack Obama birth announcement

- Born:
  - Barack Obama, 44th President of the United States; in Honolulu, Hawaii. Obama was born at 7:24 p.m. in the Kapi'olani Medical Center for Women and Children, and the birth was reported in The Honolulu Advertiser on August 13.
  - Wanda Walkowicz, second victim of the Alphabet murders (d. 1973); in Rochester, New York
  - Lauren Tom, American actress and voice artist; in Highland Park
- Died: Maurice Tourneur, 88, French film director. His 1917 film The Poor Little Rich Girl and his 1920 version of The Last of the Mohicans are both in the U.S. National Film Registry.

== August 5, 1961 (Saturday) ==
- Residents of Cuba were told that they would have until the end of Monday to exchange their Cuban pesos for new paper money, after which their old bills would be worthless. The terms were that only 250 new pesos in cash would be provided per person, and all other money would have to be deposited into a bank account. On Tuesday, Fidel Castro announced that most bank deposits of more than 10,000 old pesos would be confiscated by the government, although elderly and disabled persons would be allowed to own 20,000 pesos.
- The Berlin Crisis of 1961 began at the close of a meeting in Moscow, as leaders of the Warsaw Pact nations announced that they had agreed unanimously to sign a separate peace treaty with East Germany with the objective of ending the occupation of American, British and French troops in Berlin. That day, the number of East Germans fleeing into West Berlin had reached 1,500 or "one per minute". At the same meeting, Soviet Premier Khrushchev gave East German leader Walter Ulbricht his approval for closing the boundaries of East Berlin with a barbed-wire fence.
- The Six Flags over Texas theme park, located in Arlington officially opened to the public. The park, first of 31 that have been part of the Six Flags franchise, had had a "soft" opening for selected visitors during the first four days of August.
- Eight days of testing of the Mercury spacecraft explosive exit hatch began after the difficulties experienced during the Mercury 4 (MR-4) mission.
- Born: Hishammuddin Hussein, Malaysian politician and lawyer who served as Senior Minister of the Security Cluster and Minister of Defence from 2021 to 2022; in Johor Bahru, Johor
- Died: Hanns Seidel, 59, former minister-president of Bavaria

== August 6, 1961 (Sunday) ==
Gherman Titov

- Soviet cosmonaut Gherman Titov was launched into space at 9:00 a.m. Moscow time on Vostok 2. Staying up for 25 hours and 18 minutes, he became the first human to sleep while in outer space, and the first to be in space for more than a day. He was also the first to experience the nausea of "space sickness". At the age of 25, Titov set a record that still stands, as the youngest person ever to go into Earth orbit. At the time that Titov became the second human into Earth orbit, the U.S. had yet to send an astronaut past the planet's gravitational pull. The spacecraft weighed 13 pounds (5.9 kg) more than Vostok 1 (April 12, 1961), and the progress of Cosmonaut Titov's flight was reported continuously on Radio Moscow.
- British driver Stirling Moss won the 1961 German Grand Prix at the Nürburgring.
- Born: Ali Abbasi, Pakistani-Scottish television presenter (d. 2004); in Karachi
- Died: Jozef-Ernest van Roey, 87, Belgian cardinal and Archbishop of Mechelen since 1926

== August 7, 1961 (Monday) ==
- The famous Milgram Experiment began on the campus of Yale University, as psychologist Stanley Milgram tested the willingness of test subjects to administer torture to other people, rather than to disobey rules. The study, which would continue until March 1962, used a machine that was labeled "Shock Generator, Type ZLB" and "Output 15 Volts— 450 Volts". Unaware that they were the study subjects, volunteers were given the role of "teacher" to assist the experimenter and given a mild shock to show what the "shock generator" was capable of, then pressured by the experimenter into giving increasing amounts of voltage to a "learner" on the other side of a window. In all cases, the "learner" was pretending to receive painful shocks from the Type ZLB machine. Milgram's experiment showed that, in almost two-thirds of the experiments, the volunteers would continue to follow orders from the authority figure to deliver shocks.
- The Vostok 2 capsule and Soviet cosmonaut Gherman Titov returned to Earth, landing at 10:18 in the morning near Krasny Kut, in Soviet Russia.
- On the day of Titov's return, the U.S. House of Representatives and U.S. Senate approved almost 1.7 trillion dollars ($1,671,735,000) in aid to the U.S. space program by voice vote. The quickly passed bill included $471,750,000 funding for a crewed mission to the Moon.
- Four days after being briefed by representatives of the Martin Company on the technical characteristics and expected performance of the Titan II rocket, NASA Director Robert R. Gilruth recommended using the Titan for human spaceflight, noting that it could carry larger payloads to orbit than the Atlas rocket, making the Titan II more desirable for a two-man spacecraft. Martin officials estimated the cost of procuring and launching nine Titan II boosters at $47,889,000 to be spread over three years.
- The Cape Cod National Seashore was created, as President Kennedy signed legislation setting aside 68 square miles (180 km^{2}) of land in his native Massachusetts for public use. It was the first U.S. National Park to be established from land not already owned by the federal government, and was acquired by eminent domain with the U.S. Department of the Interior paying the landowners for the land taken.
- Born:
  - Ileen Getz, American actress (d. 2005); in Bristol, Pennsylvania
  - Walter Swinburn, English jockey (d. 2016); in Oxford
  - Brian Conley, English entertainer; in Paddington
- Died: Frank N. D. Buchman, 84, American Lutheran evangelist who founded the spiritualist movements the Oxford Group and Moral Re-Armament

== August 8, 1961 (Tuesday) ==
- The Fantastic Four team of superheroes was introduced by Marvel Comics, as issue #1 of the comic book of the same name, post-dated for November, was placed on American newsstands and stores for the first time.
- The Hamilton Tiger-Cats of the Canadian Football League defeated the visiting Buffalo Bills, at that time a member of the American Football League, in a preseason exhibition game in Hamilton. The Bills, playing the entire game under Canadian rules, lost 38–21. The game marked the only CFL–AFL meeting. CFL teams lost all six games played against NFL teams, including the last two, played the previous week (August 2, St. Louis 36, Toronto 7, and August 5, Chicago 34, Montreal 16).
- Queen Elizabeth II of the United Kingdom and her husband Prince Philip arrived at Carrickfergus on HMY Britannia to begin a 2-day royal visit to Northern Ireland.
- The SM-65F Atlas rocket was launched for the first time from Cape Canaveral Air Force Station.
- The nuclear missile carrying submarine USS Ethan Allen was commissioned.
- Born:
  - The Edge (stage name for David Howell Evans), Irish musician and guitarist for U2; in Barking, Essex, England
  - Simon Weston, Welsh war hero, broadcaster and campaigner; in Caerphilly
- Died:
  - Mei Lanfang, 66, Chinese Beijing Opera performer
  - Muriel Rahn, 50, African-American theatre singer
  - Bhagawan Nityananda, 63, Indian guru

== August 9, 1961 (Wednesday) ==
- At a reception in Moscow for cosmonaut Titov, Nikita Khrushchev told foreign diplomats and reporters that the Soviet Union had the capability of making a 100-megaton nuclear weapon. Khrushchev's threat of orbiting the super weapon, sometimes described as arising from the same speech, was made on December 9, 1961, in an address to the World Federation of Trade Unions.
- A chartered British airliner, carrying 34 schoolboys on a holiday to Norway, crashed into a mountain during a storm, killing all 39 persons on board. The students, ranging in age from 13 to 16 and accompanied by two teachers and the crew, were all from Croydon and were on the way to Stavanger.
- James Benton Parsons became the first African-American to be nominated as a judge of a United States District Court. He would be confirmed by the U.S. Senate on August 30 and serve as a federal judge for the Northern District of Illinois until his death in 1993.
- Born:
  - Brad Gilbert, American tennis coach and commentator; in Oakland
  - Jesse Vassallo, Puerto Rican world champion swimmer; in Ponce
- Died: General Walter Bedell Smith, 65, American U.S. Army commander who accepted Germany's surrender on May 7, 1945

== August 10, 1961 (Thursday) ==
- The first chemical defoliation operation in Vietnam was carried out as a Sikorsky H-34 helicopter sprayed the herbicide Dinoxol north of Kontum. Following the successful test, Operation Ranch Hand continued until October 23, 1971, destroying 7.7 million acres (31,000 km^{2}) of forests and jungles.
- The United Kingdom formally applied for membership in the European Economic Community. Negotiations lasted until 1963, when France's President Charles de Gaulle vetoed the British entry into the Common Market.
- Born: Paul Mangwana, Zimbabwean politician; in Southern Rhodesia
- Died:
  - Julia Peterkin, 80, American fiction writer and winner of the Pulitzer Prize in 1929 for Scarlet Sister Mary
  - Thomas Gordon Thompson, 72, American oceanographer
  - Géza von Bolváry, 63, Hungarian actor and film director

== August 11, 1961 (Friday) ==
- Dadra and Nagar Haveli, which had been colonies of Portugal until 1954, were merged into India as a single Union Territory.
- An annular solar eclipse occurred, visible primarily over western South America and Antarctica.
- Born: Sunil Shetty, Indian film actor; in Mulki, Mysore State (now Karnataka)
- Died: Ion Barbu, 66, Romanian mathematician and poet

== August 12, 1961 (Saturday) ==
- Walter Ulbricht, leader of East Germany, signed an order authorizing closure of the border with West Germany. Erich Honecker, SED Politburo member in charge of security matters, then signed the work order for barbed wire to be placed between East Germany and the perimeter of West Berlin and the corridors to West Germany, as referred to in his May 14, 1992 indictment, in absentia by a unified Germany. A record 2,662 East Germans escaped into West Berlin on the last full day before the border was closed, while another 1,400 who had spent the night in West Berlin declined to return.
- Among the group of defectors crossing into West Berlin were Soviet KGB assassin Bogdan Stashinsky and his wife Inge, who entered a police station hours before the border was sealed and requested that he be allowed to meet with American officials. Stashinsky told the CIA that he had been trained to use a device that sprayed hydrogen cyanide gas, and that, when sprayed directly into the faces of his victims, the poison would cause immediate death similar to that of a heart attack. Stashinsky used the "gas gun" to kill Ukrainian nationalists Lev Rebet and Stepan Bandera.
- The Federal Maritime Commission was established in the United States.
- Born: Kristin Krohn Devold, Norwegian politician; in Ålesund

== August 13, 1961 (Sunday) ==
- Construction of the Berlin Wall, ordered by Walter Ulbricht, began at 2:00 a.m. Central European Time, with the erection of a barbed-wire fence along the line between East Berlin and West Berlin, the digging of trenches along streets at the border, and the closure of railroad lines. The corridors from West Berlin to West Germany were not disturbed, and the other three Allied powers did not move troops or protest about the action. The wall would stand for the next 28 years until 9 November 1989.
- Mercury spacecraft No. 15 was delivered to Cape Canaveral but was returned to McDonnell to be reconfigured to the orbital-manned 1-day mission and tentatively assigned for Mercury-Atlas 10 (MA-10). Redesign was completed, and the spacecraft, then designated number 15A (later redesignated 15B), was delivered to Cape Canaveral on November 16, 1962.
- Born: Cary Stayner, American serial killer and the older brother of kidnapping victim Steven Stayner; in Merced, California
- Died: Victor Sassoon, 79, British financier with interests in the Far East

== August 14, 1961 (Monday) ==
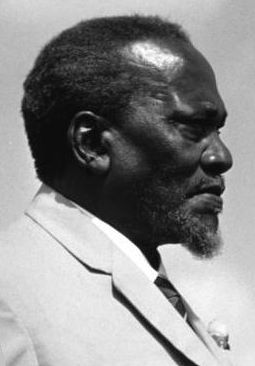
Jomo Kenyatta in 1966

- Jomo Kenyatta, leader of the Kikuyu rebellion against the colonial administrators of British East Africa, was released from imprisonment after almost nine years, and flown from Maralal back to the capital at Nairobi. Thousands of supporters lined the route of his motorcade back to the town of Gatundu. Sir Patrick Renison, the colonial Governor, begrudgingly ordered Kenyatta's release after increasing public demand. When the colony was granted independence as the nation of Kenya in 1963, Kenyatta became its first Prime Minister, and the nation's first President in 1964.
- The trial of Adolf Eichmann adjourned in Israel after 73 days, and the three-judge panel began deliberating the evidence. Eichmann, who had escaped Nazi Germany and lived in Argentina until being kidnapped and returned to Israel in 1960, would be found guilty on December 11 of causing the deaths of millions of Jews and sentenced to die. He would be hanged on May 31, 1962.
- The Brandenburg Gate was closed at 1:00 p.m. local time by East Berlin police, after a crowd of 5,000 West Berlin protesters threw rocks at East German soldiers, who responded with tear gas and water cannons. It would not be reopened to the public until 1989.
- Engineers from McDonnell met with Space Task Group (STG) engineers at Langley Research Center to review the Mercury Mark II project, an improvement on NASA's Mercury program. After six revisions over the next two months, the Project Development Plan would be submitted to NASA on October 27.
- Born:
  - Susan Olsen, American actress who played Cindy Brady, the youngest Brady child in The Brady Bunch; in Santa Monica, California
  - Satoshi Tsunami, Japanese soccer football defender with 78 caps for the Japan national team; in Tokyo
- Died: Abbé Breuil, 84, French archaeologist

== August 15, 1961 (Tuesday) ==
August 15, 1961: Liebing's photograph, Leap into Freedom

- Conrad Schumann, a 19-year-old East German border guard, defected to the West by jumping over a section of the barbed-wire fence that would soon be replaced by the cinderblocks of the Berlin Wall, crossing at Bernauer Street from East Berlin into West Berlin. Peter Leibing took the iconic photograph of Schumann's action. After the fall of the Berlin Wall, Schumann would return to the former DDR and find himself ostracized by the friends he had left behind. He would commit suicide in 1998.
- Tara Singh Malhotra, the 76-year-old leader of India's Sikh community, began a hunger strike at the Golden Temple in Amritsar, vowing to fast until the government agreed to give the Sikhs a state of their own, or until he died. Tara Singh took no food for more than six weeks, but ended the fast on October 1 after Prime Minister Nehru sent a personal emissary. The state of Punjab would be divided in 1966 to create a Sikh state and, Haryana, a Hindu state.
- In Israel, elections were held for the 120 seats in the fifth Knesset. The Mapai Party, led by Prime Minister David Ben-Gurion, lost five seats, retaining 42, with the Herut Party second with 17.

== August 16, 1961 (Wednesday) ==
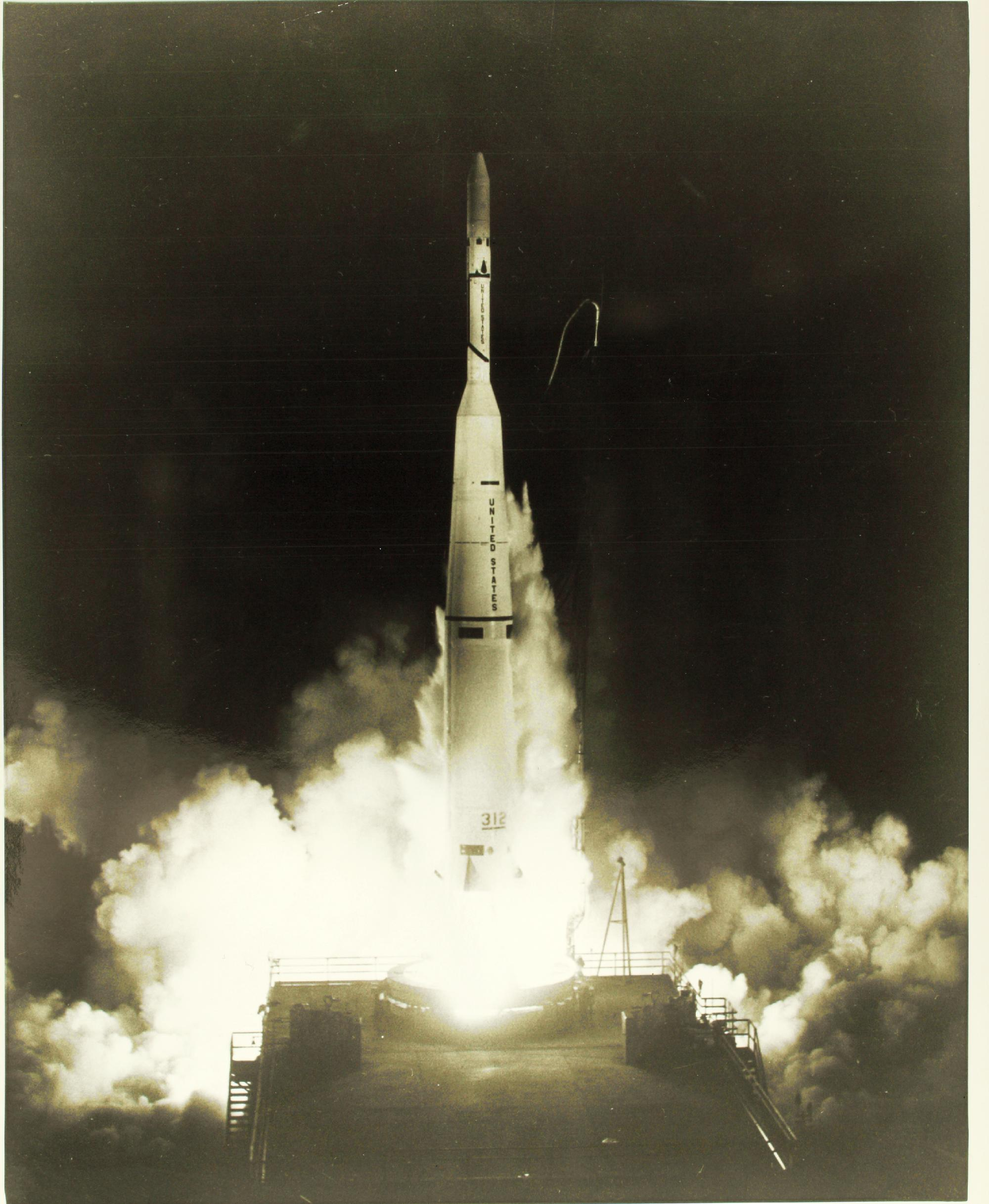
August 16, 1961: Launch of Explorer 12

- Explorer 12 was launched at 10:22 p.m. from Florida (0322 UTC Aug 16), with the aim of carrying out energetic particle research. It remained in orbit for two years and determined the boundaries of the Earth's magnetosphere.
- Three years after Egypt and Syria had merged to create the United Arab Republic, Egyptian UAR President Gamal Abdel Nasser decreed that the Egyptian and Syrian regional governments would be replaced by a "unified cabinet" with one-third of its ministers being Syrian, and based in the Egyptian capital of Cairo. Syria dissolved the UAR agreement the following month.
- The Bell UH-1D, which would become the U.S. Army's primary troop transport and medical evacuation helicopter during the Vietnam War, was test flown for the first time.
- Born:
  - Christian Okoye, Nigerian-born American football running back; in Enugu
  - Greg Jelks, American baseball player (d. 2017); in Cherokee, Alabama
  - Angela Smith, British politician; in Grimsby
  - Aziz Akhannouch, Moroccan politician, and businessman
- Died: Ferdinand Smith, 68, Jamaican-born black Communist, who served as the National Secretary of the U.S. National Maritime Union from 1939 to 1951. Smith died ten years and one day after leaving the U.S. on August 15, 1951 under threat of deportation.

== August 17, 1961 (Thursday) ==
- The Alliance for Progress (Alianza para el Progreso), an economic development program of $20 billion in United States aid to Central and South America, was created as all members of the Organization of American States except for Cuba, signed the organizational charter at a meeting in Punta del Este, Uruguay.
- FBI Director J. Edgar Hoover persuaded U.S. Attorney General Robert F. Kennedy to sign an authorization for "microphone surveillance," giving the appearance of U.S. Department of Justice approval of illegal eavesdropping.
- The U.S. Public Health Service approved use of the oral vaccine against polio. Unlike the Salk shots, which used an inactivated polio virus, Dr. Albert Sabin's invention used a weakened live Type I polio virus.
- Eight children and a woman in Aversa, Italy were killed when a howitzer shell, left over from World War II, exploded. Several children had dug the shell out of a courtyard while the others were playing.
- The single aircraft XP841 (prototype of the Handley Page HP.115) was flown for the first time at the Royal Aircraft Establishment in the UK at Bedford, with Jack Henderson as the pilot.
- After four days without comment, the United States, the United Kingdom and France made the first formal protest to the Soviet Union concerning the Berlin Wall.
- Born: Alexandr Vondra, Czech Republic Foreign Affairs Minister from 206 to 2007; in Prague, Czechoslovakia
- Died:
  - Carlos Salzedo, 76, French-born American harpist
  - Jakob Savinšek, 39, Slovene sculptor and artist

== August 18, 1961 (Friday) ==
- East German leader Walter Ulbricht ordered border troops to brick up the entrances and windows on the ground floor of the houses on the southern side of Bernauer Strasse in Berlin. Civilian workers began building the Berlin Wall, block by block, under the close supervision of the border guards, who had orders to shoot any employee who attempted to jump over to West Berlin.
- NASA Headquarters announced that an analysis of Project Mercury suborbital data indicated that all objectives of that phase of the program had been achieved and no further Mercury-Redstone flights were planned.
- Born:
  - Timothy Geithner, 75th United States Secretary of the Treasury from 2009 to 2013; in Brooklyn
  - Bob Woodruff, American TV journalist; in Bloomfield Hills, Michigan
  - Huw Edwards, British journalist and broadcaster; in Bridgend

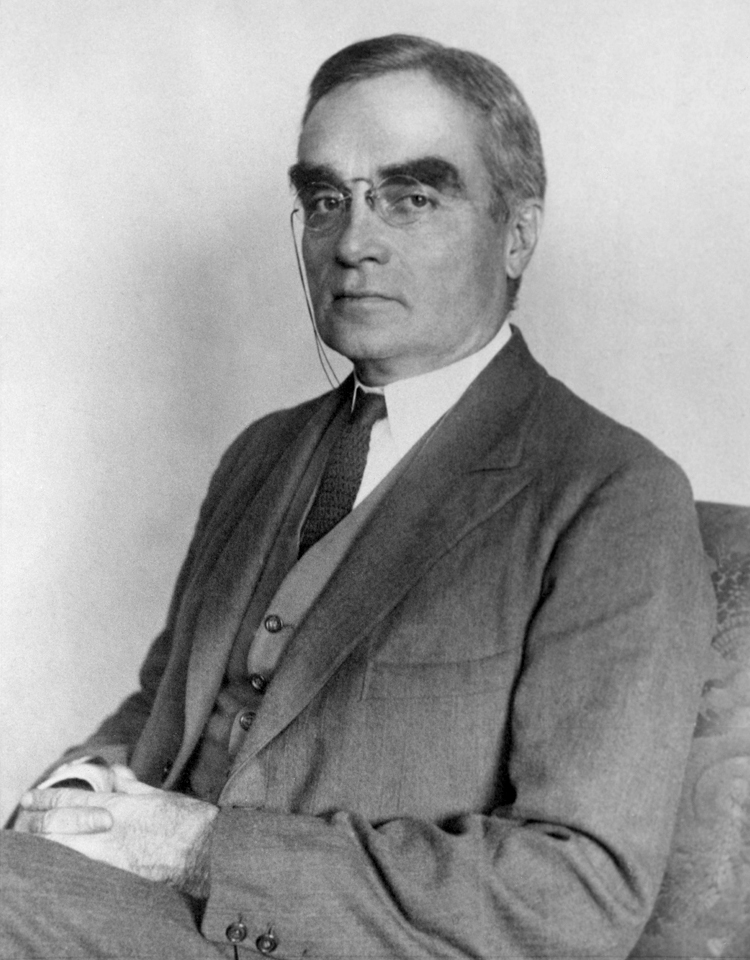
Judge Hand

- Died: Learned Hand, 89, Chief Judge of the U.S. Court of Appeals for the Second Circuit, whose opinions were so influential that he was often referred to as "the tenth justice of the U.S. Supreme Court". Though he was never appointed to the nation's highest court, that court cited his opinions more often than those of any other lower court judge.

== August 19, 1961 (Saturday) ==
- Professor Timothy Leary, a lecturer in psychology at Harvard University, delivered his paper "How to Change Behavior" at the Fourteenth International Congress of Applied Psychology, held in Copenhagen, describing use of the hallucinogen LSD, legal at the time, as the most efficient way of expanding consciousness.
- Four Corners, Australia's longest-running current affairs television programme, was broadcast for the first time. As of 2024, Four Corners had been on the air for 63 years.

== August 20, 1961 (Sunday) ==
- In order to show American support for West Berlin and reinforce the 11,000 Allied soldiers there, a convoy of 1,500 U.S. Army troops was sent by President Kennedy on a 110-mile (180 km) trip through East Germany, along the autobahn from Helmstedt to Berlin. More than 100 trucks with men, weapons and supplies were accompanied by jeeps and three M-41 tanks. The Soviet Army abided by prior agreements to permit American, British and French armies to use the Helmstedt-Berlin highway as a corridor, and the 1st Battle Group, 18th Infantry Regiment of the 18th U.S. Infantry was greeted in West Berlin by U.S. Vice-President Lyndon Johnson.
- Stirling Moss won the 1961 Kanonloppet motor race at the Karlskoga Circuit, Sweden.
- Born: Joe Pasquale, British comedian; in Grays, Essex
- Died:
  - Percy Williams Bridgman, 79, American physicist and winner of the Nobel Prize in 1946, completed an index to seven volumes of his collected works despite suffering from painful bone cancer, mailed it to the Harvard University Press, and then shot himself. He left a note commenting on the prohibition against assisted suicide for the terminally ill, writing, "It is not decent for Society to make a man do this to himself. Probably, this is the last day I will be able to do it myself."
  - Dorothy Burgess, 54, American stage and film actress, died of tuberculosis
  - Gwen Lee, 56, American film actress

== August 21, 1961 (Monday) ==
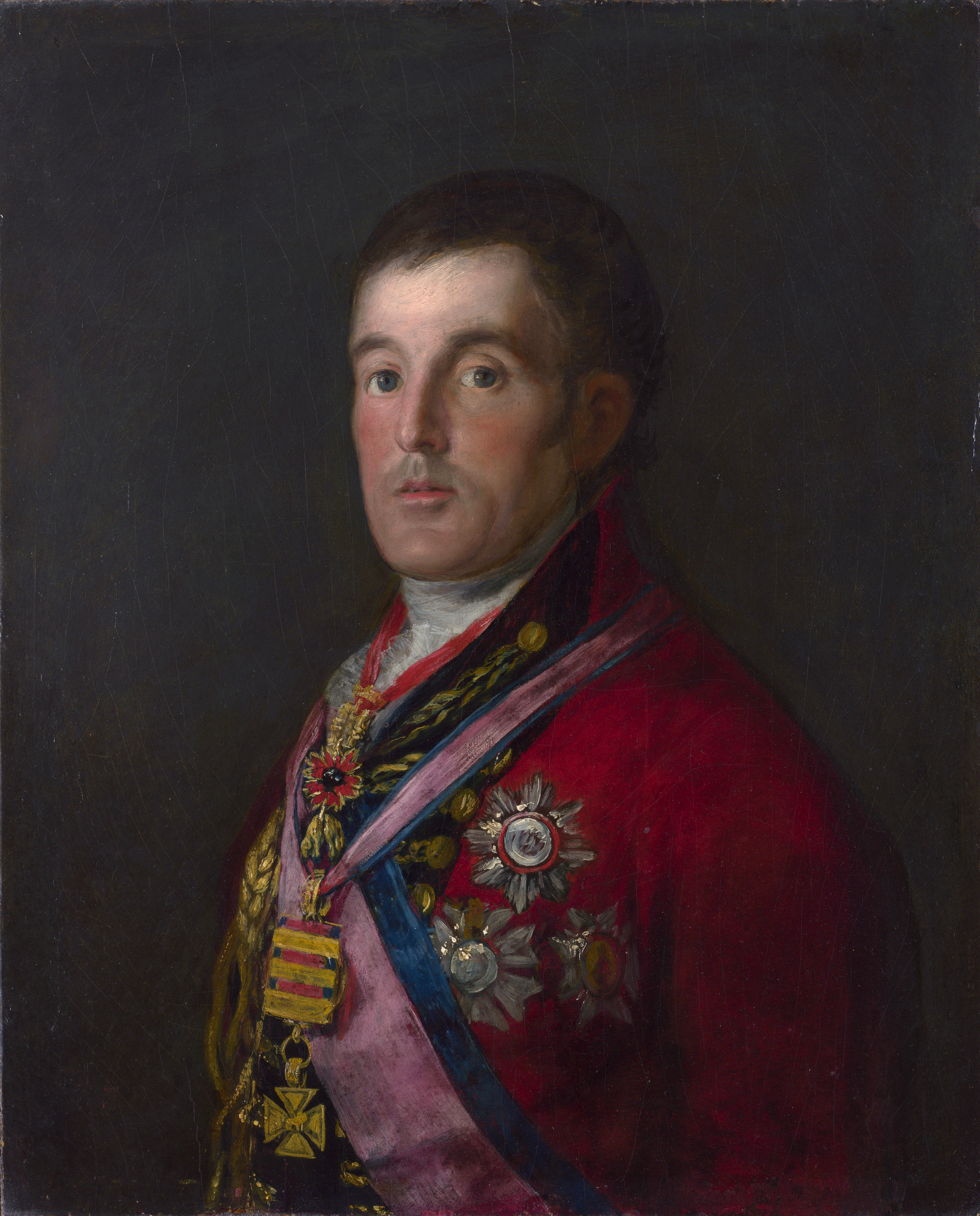
Francisco Goya's Portrait of the Duke of Wellington

- Francisco Goya's 1812 Portrait of the Duke of Wellington, was stolen from the National Gallery in London, by thieves who had hidden inside the museum before it closed, then waited for the alarm system to be turned off. Stolen on the fiftieth anniversary of the August 21, 1911 theft of the Mona Lisa from Paris, the portrait had recently been repurchased from American collector Charles Wrightsman for £140,000 ($392,000). Goya's masterpiece would finally be recovered on May 21, 1965, at a luggage locker in the New Street railway station in Birmingham.
- All restrictions on Jomo Kenyatta's movement were lifted, a month after his release from prison and after one week confinement to his home in Gatundu in Kenya. Besides signing the papers acknowledging the end of his arrest, he also signed a receipt for his carved walking stick, given back to him nine years after his 1952 arrest.
- Born:
  - Stephen Hillenburg, American animator best known for creating the Nickelodeon show SpongeBob SquarePants; in Lawton, Oklahoma (died from ALS, 2018)
  - Igor Chudinov, 12th Prime Minister of Kyrgyzstan from 2007 to 2009; in Frunze

== August 22, 1961 (Tuesday) ==
- The Politburo of East Germany's SED approved an order instructing police and soldiers at the Antifaschistischer Schutzwall (the Anti-Fascist Protection Wall known in the West as the Berlin Wall) that persons attempting to flee to the "fascist" side in West Berlin were to be "called to order, if necessary, by use of weapons", a euphemism for shooting anyone who ignored a warning to halt. The first shooting under the law would take place two days later.
- Rotherham United FC defeated Aston Villa at home at Millmoor, 2–0 in the first leg (first of two games) for the inaugural English League Cup. The semifinal matches had taken place in the spring. Since the championship would be based on the aggregate score of both games, Aston Villa was down 2–0 when it hosted the second game on September 5.
- Poet Nicolas Guillen founded the National Union of Writers and Artists of Cuba.
- Born:
  - Roland Orzabal, British musician for the pop rock band Tears for Fears; in Portsmouth, Hampshire, England
  - Andrés Calamaro, Argentinian musician; in Buenos Aires
- Died: Ida Siekmann, 58, became the first fatality from the Berlin Wall, after jumping from the window of her third-floor apartment at 48 Bernauer Strasse in an attempt to escape from East Berlin.

== August 23, 1961 (Wednesday) ==
- The San Francisco Giants tied a major league record by hitting five home runs in one inning in a game against the Cincinnati Reds, winning 14–0 after going into the final inning with a 2–0 lead. It was only the third game with 5 homers in an inning, and the Reds were losers on all three. The first had been a Giants-Reds game on June 6, 1939, and the second had been a Phillies-Reds game on June 2, 1949. Since then, it has happened once in an American League game (Twins v. A's, June 9, 1966), and in a fourth Reds' loss, April 22, 2006 to the Brewers.
- Under a new regulation from East Germany (DDR), residents of West Berlin were no longer allowed to cross into East Berlin unless they were issued a pass by the East German government. However, the only two DDR offices in West Berlin had been ordered closed by West Germany and the Western Allies, so no passes were available until an agreement was reached in 1963.
- The first American "space platform", Ranger 1, was launched into orbit, but a rocket failure prevented the satellite from reaching the planned higher altitude, sending it tumbling into low Earth orbit instead. Ranger 1 re-entered the atmosphere a week later and burned up.
- Michael Gregsten was shot and killed at Deadman's Hill on the A6 highway, near the village of Clophill, Bedfordshire, in England. Gregsten's companion, Valerie Storie, was raped, shot and left for dead. James Hanratty would later be convicted and executed for the murder.
- Born: Alexandre Desplat, French film composer; in Paris
- Died: Gotthard Sachsenberg, 69, German World War I air ace

== August 24, 1961 (Thursday) ==
- The Mercury-Atlas 4 (MA-4) uncrewed orbital flight was postponed.
- The 1961 Pan Arab Games opened at Casablanca in Morocco.
- Born: Jared Harris, British actor; in London
- Died:
  - Günter Litfin, 24, became the first person to be killed by border guards while trying to escape from East Berlin across the Berlin Wall. Liftin was attempting to swim across the Humboldt Harbor to the British Sector and sank underwater after being shot multiple times.
  - Huaso, 28, holder of the high-jump record for a horse. The mark of 2.47 m (8 ft 1 in), set on February 5, 1949, in Viña del Mar, Chile, remains unsurpassed 68 years after it was set.
  - Sardar Vedaratnam, 63, Indian politician and philanthropist

== August 25, 1961 (Friday) ==
- Jânio Quadros resigned suddenly as President of Brazil. In a letter read to a surprised Chamber of Deputies at 3:00 that afternoon, four hours after Quadros left Brasília, he wrote that "Terrible forces rose against me and plotted against me or maligned me, even while pretending to collaborate." It was speculated that the popular Quadros had gambled that the National Congress would ask him to return and grant him stronger powers, rather than let his unpopular vice-president, João Goulart, take office. Instead, a joint session of the Federal Senate and the Chamber voted to accept the resignation, and Chamber of Deputies leader Pascoal Ranieri Mazzilli was sworn in as Acting President. After initial objections by the military, Goulart was allowed to become the new President on September 7.
- Explorer 13, designed in part to measure the effects of micrometeoroids on spaceflight, was launched from the U.S., equipped with two cadmium sulfide cell detectors to detect particles. The geocentric orbit was too low the spacecraft re-entered the atmosphere two days later without measuring any penetrations.
- Born: Billy Ray Cyrus, American country music singer and later a film producer for his daughter, Miley Cyrus; in Flatwoods, Kentucky

== August 26, 1961 (Saturday) ==
- In the case of Reynolds v. Sims, a group of registered voters in Jefferson County, Alabama, filed suit in the federal court in Birmingham, challenging the apportionment of the state legislature, which had been unchanged since 1901. In 1964, the U.S. Supreme Court would rule that unequally populated state legislative districts were a violation of "equal participation" by voters, and thus a violation of the Equal Protection Clause. The result would be the reapportionment of state legislatures nationwide.
- Burma (now Myanmar) amended its constitution to declare Buddhism as the nation's official religion. Provision for a state religion would be omitted when a new constitution was promulgated in 1974.
- The Hockey Hall of Fame was opened in Toronto. Renowned players had been inducted since 1943, but it was 18 years before a museum was created.
- Died:
  - Howard P. Robertson, 58, American mathematician and physicist, died 16 days after being injured in an automobile accident in Pasadena August 10.
  - Gail Russell, 36, American film actress whose career as a leading lady was ruined by alcoholism, died from alcohol-related liver damage
  - Nickelsburg László, 37, Hungarian dissident, was hanged after being convicted of leading a conspiracy against the government. He was the last of at least 229 people put to death for participating in the Hungarian Revolution of 1956.
  - Vladimir Sofronitsky, 60, Russian pianist

== August 27, 1961 (Sunday) ==
- The Algerian nationalist front dropped Ferhat Abbas as its leader, and replaced him with Ben Youssef Ben Khedda as the Premier of the Provisional Government of the Algerian Republic, to be established if the nation could obtain independence from France. Ben Khedda would yield to Abderrahmane Farès upon France's recognition of Algerian sovereignty in 1962.
- Mercury spacecraft No. 13, designated for the first orbital flight for an American astronaut, was shipped to Cape Canaveral. Test and checkout work on the spacecraft began immediately. On February 20, 1962, the spacecraft would be launched with John Glenn on the Mercury 6 mission.
- British driver Stirling Moss won the 1961 Danish Grand Prix at the Roskilde Ring, the first Grand Prix ever to be held at that racing circuit.
- Born: Tom Ford, American fashion designer and filmmaker; in Austin, Texas
- Died: Kálmán Rózsahegyi, 87, Hungarian actor and drama teacher

== August 28, 1961 (Monday) ==
- ONUC (Organisation des Nations Unies au Congo), the multinational United Nations peacekeeping force in the former Belgian Congo, carried out Operation Rum Punch in Katanga, rounding up all "white officers and mercenaries" of the Belgian Gendarmerie. Striking at dawn, Indian troops seized the radio station and telephone exchange in Elisabethville (now Lubumbashi), while troops from Sweden, India and Ireland captured military posts, and within 12 hours, 79 foreigners had been arrested, while another 350 surrendered.
- Born:
  - Kim Appleby, English singer, songwriter and actor; in Stoke Newington, England
  - Jennifer Coolidge, American actress; in Boston

== August 29, 1961 (Tuesday) ==
- Six people in an aerial tramway car plummeted 700 feet (210 m) to their deaths when an Armée de l'Air F-84F Thunderstreak jet fighter accidentally struck and severed the cable. The car, with a German family of four and an Italian father and son, was returning from the Alpine peak of Aiguille du Midi to Chamonix. The upward traveling cable was undamaged, but 81 tourists were stranded for hours until they were rescued.
- The first group of Peace Corps volunteers departed Washington for Accra, the capital of Ghana. The afternoon before, the Ghana volunteers, and another group bound for Tanganyika, were hosted by President Kennedy at the White House.
- Born: Chuwit Kamolvisit, controversial Thai politician; in British Hong Kong
- Died: Laksamilawan, 62, consort of King Vajiravudh of Siam who was murdered in an attempted robbery

== August 30, 1961 (Wednesday) ==
- The first launch of a missile from an underground missile silo ended in failure. A Minuteman left the silo, at Cape Canaveral, then veered out of control and crashed back down into the launch area.
- School segregation in Atlanta in the U.S. state of Georgia ended after more than a century, and without serious incident, as nine African-American students enrolled in four previously all-White schools Henry W. Grady High School, as well as the Murphy, Brown and Northside High Schools, under the supervision of city police. There were 48,000 students in five Negro other schools, and 69,000 in the 17 White schools. Atlanta's 73 White and 41 Negro elementary and middle schools would remain segregated during the rest of the school year.
- NASA began an investigation into the premature activation of the explosive exit hatch of the uncrewed Mercury-Redstone 4 spacecraft. Though tests were made under more severe conditions than those in pre-launch activities and tests, no premature firings occurred. As a backup, James Smith McDonnell was asked to design a mechanical hatch, but the model weighed 60 pounds (27 kg) more than the explosive hatch. Eventually, a new procedure required that the firing plunger safety pin would be left in place until a helicopter hook was attached to the spacecraft and tension was applied to the recovery cable.
- The 1961 Convention on the Reduction of Statelessness was signed in New York but did not take effect until December 13, 1975.
- Born: Jyri Häkämies, Finnish politician; in Karhula
- Died:
  - Charles Coburn, 84, American film actor, 1943 winner of Best Supporting Actor award for The More The Merrier
  - John Wesley Dobbs, 78, African American civic and political leader
  - Robert Edward Cruickshank, 73, Anglo-Canadian VC recipient

== August 31, 1961 (Thursday) ==
- The Soviet Union announced the end of its three-year worldwide moratorium on nuclear testing, declaring that it would detonate a nuclear weapon the next day. Over the next three months, the Soviets would conduct 31 atmospheric bomb explosions.
