= Danish Grand Prix (disambiguation) =

Danish Grand Prix is a Formula One motor race.

Danish Grand Prix may also refer to:

- Speedway Grand Prix of Denmark
- Dansk Melodi Grand Prix, annual music competition
