= July 1961 =

Month of 1961

<<	July 1961					>>
Su	Mo	Tu	We	Th	Fr	Sa
						1
2	3	4	5	6	7	8
9	10	11	12	13	14	15
16	17	18	19	20	21	22
23	24	25	26	27	28	29
30	31

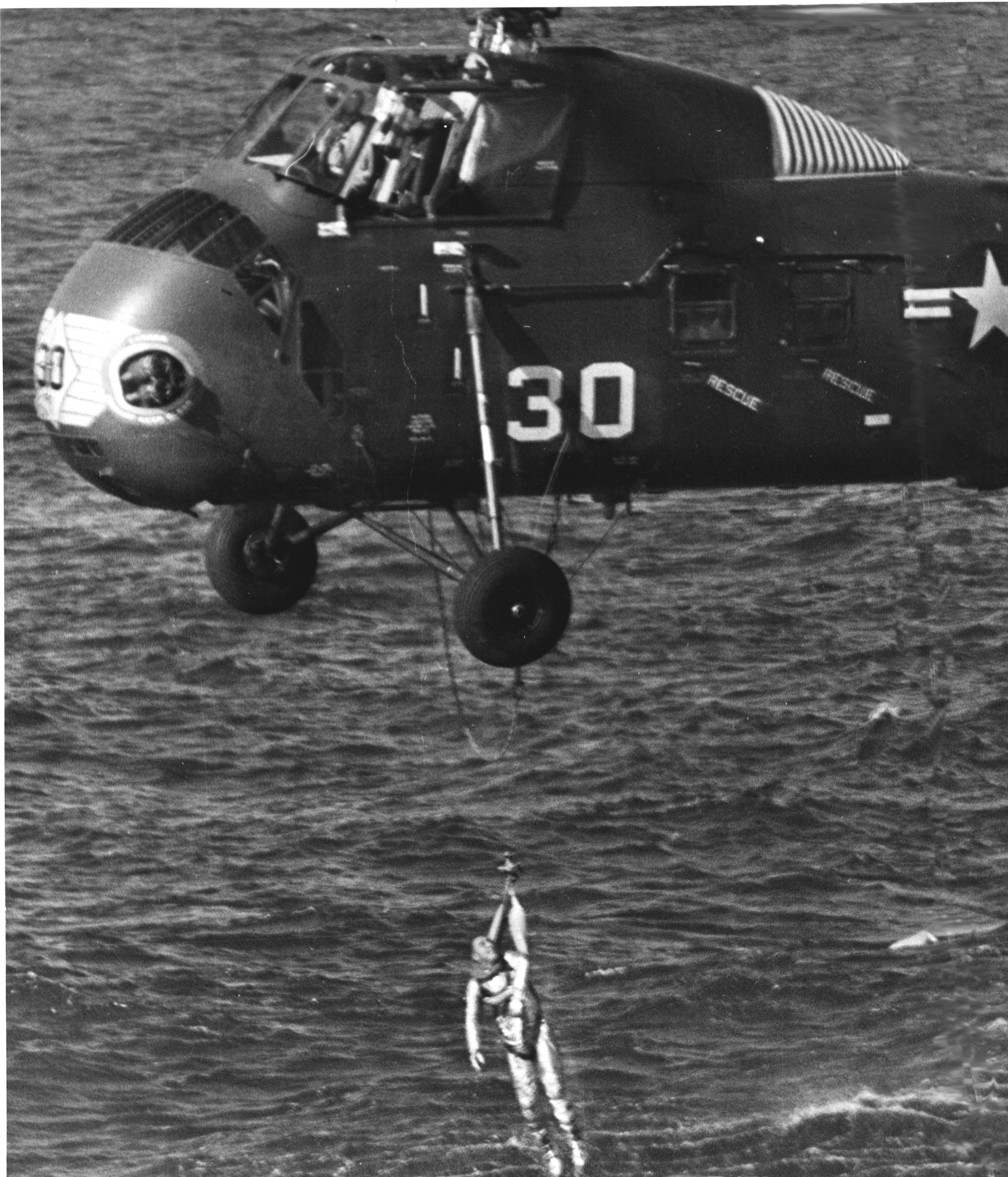
July 21, 1961: U.S. astronaut Gus Grissom escapes sinking space capsule on return to Earth

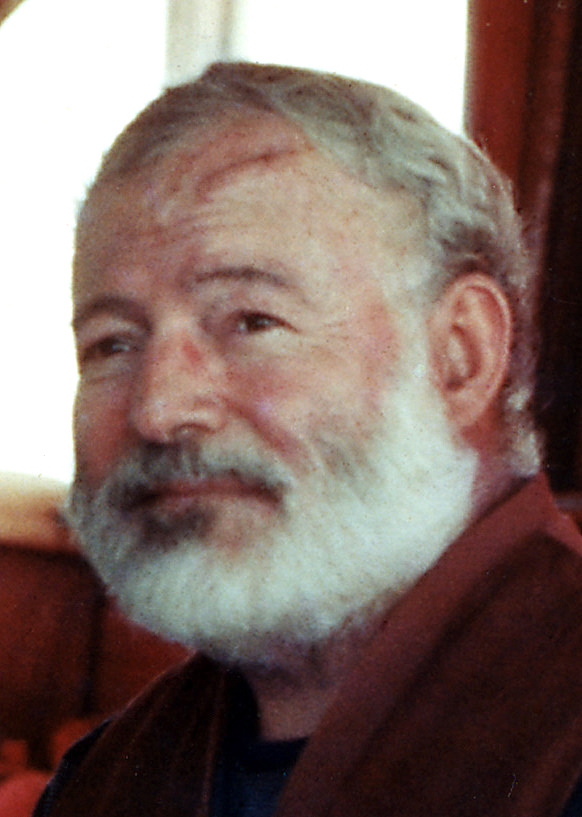
July 2, 1961: Author Ernest Hemingway commits suicide

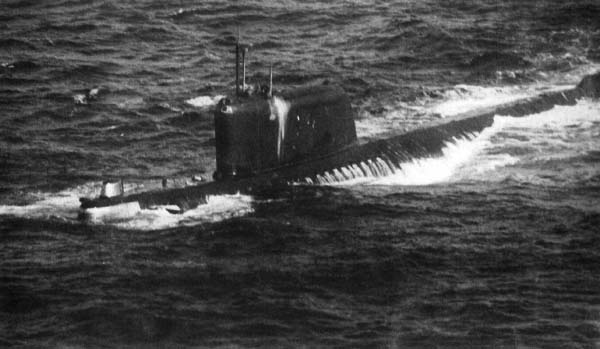
July 4, 1961: Soviet nuclear sub K-19 has reactor accident

The following events occurred in July 1961:

== July 1, 1961 (Saturday) ==
- At the request of the Emir of Kuwait, 7,000 British troops and 1,200 Saudi troops arrived to protect the small nation against a possible invasion by Iraq.
- The Dowry Prohibition Act went into effect in India, prohibiting the solicitation or payment of money from one family to another as consideration for a marriage.
- Fantasy Island, a theme park on Grand Island near Buffalo, New York, opened.
- Responsibility for the operation of the Mercury global network was assigned to the Goddard Space Flight Center. During active mission periods, network control would revert to Space Task Group personnel.
- Born:
  - Diana Spencer, later Diana, Princess of Wales, shortly after marrying Charles III in 1981; at Park House, Sandringham, England (killed in auto accident, 1997)
  - Carl Lewis, American track athlete; in Birmingham, Alabama
  - Dominic Keating (stage name for Dominic Power), British television actor known for Star Trek: Enterprise; in Leicester, Leicestershire
- Died: Louis-Ferdinand Céline, 67, French doctor and writer

== July 2, 1961 (Sunday) ==
- In a meeting at the Kremlin, Soviet leader Nikita Khrushchev warned Sir Frank Roberts, the British Ambassador, that Britain and France should avoid joining the United States in going to war over West Berlin, telling him, "Six hydrogen bombs would be quite enough to annihilate the British Isles, and nine would take care of France."
- In elections for the Chamber of Deputies in Mexico, voters went to the polls to elect 178 members to serve for three-year terms. The ruling PRI party won a majority of the seats.
- Died: American novelist Ernest Hemingway, 61, committed suicide at his home in Ketchum, Idaho, two days after returning home to Idaho from a course of treatment for depression at the Mayo Clinic. After shooting himself, Hemingway reportedly died shortly after 7:30 in the morning. His wife, Mary, told reporters initially that the renowned author had accidentally died while cleaning a double-barrelled shotgun.

== July 3, 1961 (Monday) ==
- General Douglas MacArthur, 81, returned to the Philippines for the first time since the end of World War II, and received a tumultuous welcome. MacArthur, who had led the liberation of the islands from the Japanese, had been given honorary citizenship, and declared, "You have no more loyal and devoted a Filipino."
- Major General Park Chung Hee forced the resignation of Korean leader Chang Do-Young and became chief of the military junta that had taken over in May. Chang's job of Prime Minister of South Korea was assigned to Lt. Gen. Song Yo-chan.
- Dan Ingram, considered by many in broadcasting to be the greatest Top 40 disc jockey of all time, joined 77 WABC in New York. Ingram remained with WABC for 21 years until the station switched to a talk format in 1982.
- The stage première of the opera Krapp, ou, La dernière bande (Krapp's Last Tape) by Marcel Mihalovici with libretto by Samuel Beckett, took place at the Théâtre des Nations in Paris.
- Invoking the Taft–Hartley Act, a U.S. federal court ordered a temporary halt to the 19-day-old, nationwide maritime strike that had held up freight shipping.
- As a result of the lobbying of Dr. Harold Griffith, the Queen Elizabeth Hospital of Montreal opened the first intensive care unit in Canada.
- Malcolm Arnold conducted the first performance of his Symphony No. 5 at the Cheltenham Music Festival.
- Died: Edwin Perkins, 72, American inventor of Kool-Aid

== July 4, 1961 (Tuesday) ==
- At 4:15 a.m., the Soviet submarine K-19 developed a leak in its nuclear reactor, while conducting exercises in the North Atlantic near the Norwegian island of Jan Mayen. The rupture of the primary coolant system caused the water pressure in the aft reactor to drop to zero and causing failure of the coolant pumps. Eight crew members died within three weeks of the accident, and others were successfully treated for deadly doses of radiation.
- La Notte by Michelangelo Antonioni won the Golden Bear Award for Best Film at the 11th Berlin International Film Festival.
- Born:
  - Hesham Mohamed Hadayet, Egyptian terrorist who carried out the 2002 Los Angeles Airport shooting and was killed in the shootout(d.2002)
  - Andrew Zimmern, American chef and television host; in New York City

== July 5, 1961 (Wednesday) ==
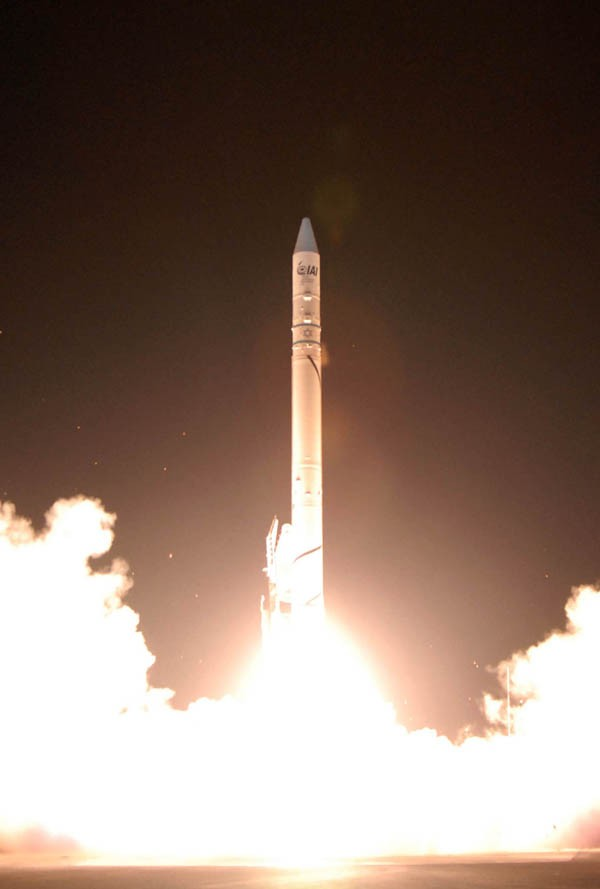
July 5, 1961: Launch of Shavit 2

- The first Israeli rocket, Shavit 2, was launched. At 4:41 a.m., the missile, ostensibly for "meteorological research" rather than for carrying warheads, was sent up "from a secret installation on the Mediterranean".
- Tunisia announced that it was claiming the French military base located at Bizerte, which had been the only base remaining after France had withdrawn all of its forces in 1958.

== July 6, 1961 (Thursday) ==
- In Moscow, North Korea and the Soviet Union signed a "Treaty of Friendship, Cooperation and Mutual Assistance", providing that if one of the nations was in a state of war, the other one would extend military assistance. Five days later, North Korea signed a similar treaty with the People's Republic of China.
- Morocco signed a treaty with Algerian rebels led by Ferhat Abbas, pledging support for the independence movement against France, and agreeing that any further negotiations on the border between the two nations would be made after independence.
- Born: Benita Fitzgerald-Brown, American track athlete and 1984 Olympic gold medalist; in Warrenton, Virginia
- Died:
  - Edwin Bush, 21, British murderer who had been the first to be convicted based on the identikit system, was hanged at HM Prison Pentonville in London.
  - Scott LaFaro, 25, American jazz bassist who was one third of the Bill Evans Trio, was killed in an auto accident near Avon, New York.
  - Cuno Amiet, 92, Swiss artist

== July 7, 1961 (Friday) ==
- A mine explosion in Czechoslovakia killed 108 coal miners. The blast, which happened at the Dukla mine at Karviná, Czech Republic, caused an underground fire that prevented rescuers from reaching the trapped men.
- Tennis star Rod Laver of Australia defeated American Chuck McKinley in straight sets, 6–3, 6–1 and 6–4 to win the championship at Wimbledon.
- McDonnell Aircraft Corporation briefed NASA's Space Task Group about three configurations for a redesign of the Mercury spacecraft. The three options were a slight modification to improve accessibility; the installation of an ejection seat; and a capsule that could carry two astronauts. In all cases, the capsule would be returned to Earth with two main parachutes, but with the ejection seat serving as a backup.
- Born:
  - Welshman Ncube, Zimbabwean politician, founder of the Movement for Democratic Change – Ncube and former Minister of Industry and Commerce from 2009 to 2013; in Gwelo, Southern Rhodesia
  - Eric Jerome Dickey, American author; in Memphis, Tennessee (died of cancer, 2021)
  - Michael Kieran Harvey, Australian pianist; in Sydney
- Died: Georgy Aleksandrov, 53, Soviet Marxist philosopher

== July 8, 1961 (Saturday) ==
- A series of explosions killed 237 people on the Portuguese ship Save after the vessel ran aground on a sandbar in Mozambique.
- John Profumo, the British Secretary of State for War, was introduced to Christine Keeler at a party. The extramarital affair that followed, and Profumo's false statements about it to Parliament, caused a scandal in 1963 that led to his resignation; and may have been a factor in the retirement later that year of Prime Minister Harold Macmillan and the defeat of the Conservative Party in the 1964 elections.
- Dissatisfied with life in the Soviet Union, American defector Lee Harvey Oswald flew from Minsk to Moscow, then went to the American Embassy to ask for the return of his U.S. Passport, #1733242. His passport was returned, and he, his wife, and his daughter departed for the United States the following year.
- The United Klans of America was created by the merger of several different racist groups meeting at Indian Springs, Georgia, seeking a revival of the Ku Klux Klan. Alabama Knights leader Robert Shelton became the first Grand Wizard of the new UKA.
- No Briton had won the women's championship at Wimbledon in 24 years, but in an all-British final, Angela Mortimer beat Christine Truman, 4–6, 6–4 and 7–5.
- Born:
  - Andy Fletcher, English keyboard player and founding member of the electronic band Depeche Mode (d. 2022); in Nottingham
  - Kelly Kryczka, Canadian synchronized swimmer; gold medalist, 1982 World Aquatic Championships; in Calgary
  - Toby Keith, American country music singer (d. 2024); in Clinton, Oklahoma
- Died: Julián Bautista, 60, Spanish classical music composer

== July 9, 1961 (Sunday) ==
- Greece, represented by Deputy Prime Minister Panagiotis Kanellopoulos, and the European Economic Community, represented by West German Vice-Chancellor Ludwig Erhard signed a treaty making Greece the first nation to become an associate member of the Common Market, effective November 1, 1962. Similar agreements followed between the EEC and Turkey, Malta and Cyprus.
- The Turkish Constitution of 1961 was approved by voters in a referendum. With an 81% turnout rate, there were 6,348,191 votes in favor and 3,934,370 against.
- Died: Whittaker Chambers, 60, former American Communist who later became a staunch anti-Communist after testifying against Alger Hiss

== July 10, 1961 (Monday) ==
- In a secret meeting with Soviet nuclear scientists, Nikita Khrushchev announced his decision to resume nuclear testing and to end the moratorium that the U.S. and the USSR had observed since 1958. Khrushchev gave the go-ahead for physicists Andrei Sakharov and Yakov Zeldovich to test a 100 megaton hydrogen bomb, the largest up to that time, which, Sakharov would say later, Khrushchev would call a device that would "hang over capitalists like the sword of Damocles".
- Mildred Gillars, nicknamed "Axis Sally", was released from the women's federal prison in Alderson, West Virginia, after serving 12 years of a sentence for treason. An American citizen, she moved to Berlin in 1934; during World War II, she was "the starring voice of Nazi propaganda" in English-language radio broadcasts aimed at American troops in Europe.
- The German Banking Act was passed, creating a federal bank regulating agency, the Bundesaufsichtsamt für das Kreditwesen (Federal Bank Supervisory Office).
- Born: Liyel Imoke, Nigerian politician and state governor; in Ibadan

== July 11, 1961 (Tuesday) ==
- Following a contest to come up with a name for an artificial lake, near Mount Isa, Queensland, Australia, created in 1958 by a dam on the Leichhardt River, the winning entry was selected from 471 suggested names. Lake Moondarra, the entry suggested by 9-year-old Danny Driscoll, is said to have been an Australian aboriginal (Murri-language) name that means 'plenty of rain, also thunder'.
- Five days after signing a friendship and military assistance treaty with the Soviet Union, North Korea signed a similar agreement with the People's Republic of China. Together, the two treaties established a balance of power at the 38th parallel, between the northern allies (North Korea, the USSR and China) and the southern allies (South Korea and the U.S.).
- United Airlines Flight 859, a DC-8 jet, crashed while landing in Denver, killing 17 of the 115 people on board and one person on the ground.
- Born: Ophir Pines-Paz, Israeli Minister of Internal Affairs; in Rishon LeZion

== July 12, 1961 (Wednesday) ==
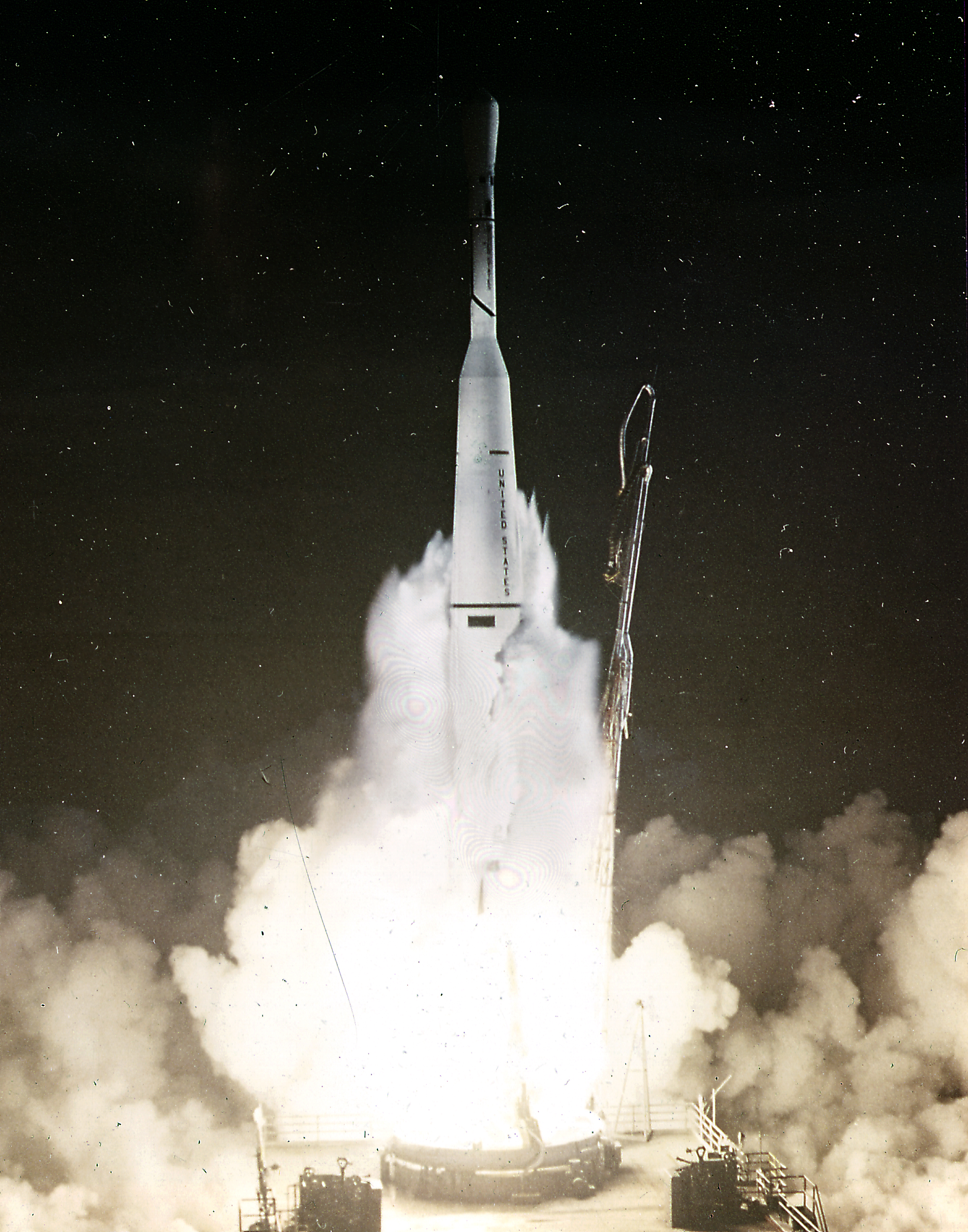
July 12, 1961: Launch of the TIROS-3 weather satellite

- The TIROS-3 satellite was launched from Florida, and the MIDAS-3 satellite was fired into orbit from California. TIROS-3 would become the first satellite to photograph storms during the 1961 Atlantic hurricane season. The MIDAS-3 spy satellite reached orbit, but ran out of power after only five orbits when its solar power arrays failed to completely deploy.
- A Czechoslovak Airlines Ilyushin-18 turboprop airplane crashed while attempting to make a landing in Casablanca, Morocco, killing all 72 people on board. The flight had originated in Prague and stopped at Zürich before continuing to Africa.
- An alleged "unexplained incident" is said to have occurred in Shreveport, Louisiana, when peaches "fell from the sky" on a group of carpenters roofing a house. Though oft-repeated, there were no contemporary accounts of such an occurrence and the earliest mention appears to have been in a 1978 book.
- The Voynich manuscript was sold for the last time, to bookdealer Hans Kraus for $24,500. Although the undeciphered medieval book had been the subject of much study, and Kraus asked as much as $160,000 for it, he had no takers, and finally donated it to Yale University in 1969.
- Eight people were killed when lightning struck a tobacco curing barn in Clinton, North Carolina, where they had taken shelter from a storm. Although they were inside, the victims had been sitting on metal surfaces when the bolt hit.
- Lech Wałęsa, 17, began working at the Lenin Shipyard in Gdańsk, Poland. In 1980, he would lead a strike there and help form the Solidarność (Solidarity) trade union, a key moment in the downfall of Communism.
- Mario Jascalevich was granted his medical license by the state of New Jersey. He later would be indicted for homicide in the multiple deaths of patients at the Riverdell Hospital in Oradell, New Jersey.
- A dam at Panshet in India burst, causing massive flooding in the city of Pune. Although there was significant damage to property, there was little to no loss of human life.
- The first Ohrid Summer Festival opened in Macedonia.
- Born: Robert Shafran, Eddy Galland and David Kellman, subjects of the 2018 documentary Three Identical Strangers, were born at Long Island Jewish Medical Center and put up for adoption to three separate families, each unaware of the multiple birth. By chance, the identical triplets would discover each other in 1980, and would find out that the Louise Wise Agency had secretly studied them to gather data on separation of twins and triplets.
- Died:
  - Roger Tredwell, 76, American diplomat, best known for his imprisonment during the Russian Revolution in 1918
  - Mazo de la Roche, 82, Canadian novelist

== July 13, 1961 (Thursday) ==
- In "the last of the early Cold War spy cases", Robert Soblen was convicted of espionage for the Soviet Union against the United States. Sentenced to life imprisonment, but allowed to post bail while the conviction was on appeal, Soblen fled to Israel. He would take an overdose of barbiturates while awaiting deportation back to the U.S. and die on September 11, 1962.
- Born: Anders Järryd, Swedish tennis player and winner of eight Grand Slam men's doubles titles (3 French Open, 2 Wimbledon and U.S. Open, one Australian Open); in Lidköping

== July 14, 1961 (Friday) ==
- Martti Miettunen, the Governor of Lapland, replaced Vieno Johannes Sukselainen as Prime Minister of Finland. Sukselainen had been forced to resign after being convicted of abusing public funds.
- Born: Unsuk Chin, South Korean composer; in Seoul

== July 15, 1961 (Saturday) ==
- In Pakistan, President Ayub Khan promulgated the Muslim Family Laws Ordinance of 1961 to supersede traditional Sunni and Shia Muslim law practices concerning marriage, divorce, and inheritance. Under the unpopular MFLO, divorces, remarriages, and polygamous marriages had to be approved by a local Arbitration Council, and violations of the law were punishable by jail.
- Elections were held in the Australian state of Victoria to elect the 66 members of the state's Legislative Assembly and 17 members of the 34-member Legislative Council. The Liberal and Country Party (LCP) government of Premier Henry Bolte won a third term in office.
- William A. Fitzgerald, alias Nathan Boya, became the fifth person known to have ridden over Niagara Falls and survived. Fitzgerald, an African-American, encased himself in a 6-foot (1.8 m) diameter "rubber-coated steel ball", and said, "I have integrated Niagara Falls."
- Atlas launch vehicle 88-D was delivered to Cape Canaveral for the Mercury-Atlas 4 (MA-4) mission.
- German driver Wolfgang von Trips won the 1961 British Grand Prix at Aintree.
- Born: Forest Whitaker, American film actor, winner of 2006 Academy Award for Best Actor for his portrayal of Ugandan dictator Idi Amin Dada in The Last King of Scotland; in Longview, Texas

== July 16, 1961 (Sunday) ==
- In one of the bloodiest battles up to that time in fighting in Vietnam, 187 Viet Cong and 12 South Vietnamese troops were killed in a clash at the Plain of Reeds.
- The Singleton Bank rail crash occurred in Lancashire, England, when the 8:50 diesel multiple unit passenger train from Colne to Fleetwood collided with the rear of a ballast train at about 45 miles per hour (72 km/h). Seven people, including the driver, were killed, and another 116 were injured.
- Died: George Jivajirao Scindia of Gwalior, 45, last Maharaja of Gwalior State in central India

== July 17, 1961 (Monday) ==
- Valery Brumel of the Soviet Union broke the world record for the high jump with a leap of 2.24 meters. On June 18, Brumel had reached 2.23 meters, appearing to have bested the record set in 1960 by American John Thomas, until Thomas's 1960 record of 7 feet, 3 3/4 inches, was recalculated from 2.22 to 2.23. When Brumel and Thomas competed against each other at the U.S.-USSR dual track and field meet in Moscow, Brumel set a new mark of 2.24 m or 7'4". At the same meet, Ralph Boston broke his own record in the long jump, reaching 8.28 m or 27'2".
- Born:
  - Veton Surroi, Kosovo Albanian newspaper publisher and politician, founder of the Reformist Party ORA; in Pristina, SR Serbia, Yugoslavia
  - Jeremy Hardy, English comedian and broadcaster; in Farnborough, Hampshire (died of cancer, 2019)
- Died: Ty Cobb, 74, American baseball player who was the American League batting champion 12 times during the 13 seasons between 1907 and 1919, and was one of the first players to be inducted into the Baseball Hall of Fame.

== July 18, 1961 (Tuesday) ==
- The Basque separatist group ETA (Euskadi Ta Askatasuna) carried out its first act of terrorism on the 25th anniversary of the 1936 uprising that brought Francisco Franco to power in Spain, by sabotaging a train carrying hundreds of veterans to San Sebastián. Whether it was a plan "to derail the trains without harming any of the passengers", or an action which, "had it not been discovered...might well have caused injuries or even deaths", no trains were derailed, but the Franco government arrested more than 100 Basque activists and sentenced many of them to long prison terms. The ETA responded by stepping up its attacks.
- At a council in Zagorsk of bishops of the Russian Orthodox Church, Patriarch Alexy I of Moscow pressured the assembled group to approve changes in the laws of the church. The new rules, demanded by Nikita Khrushchev in a meeting with Alexy, transferred control of affairs in the various parishes from the local priests to committees of three laymen who would follow the guidance of the Soviet Communist Party.
- Meeting at Bad Godesberg in West Germany, the leaders of the six European Economic Community nations (Belgium, France, Italy, Luxembourg, the Netherlands and West Germany) agreed to a plan to hold regular summits, and to further the goals of "political unification" of the Common Market nations, a forerunner of the European Community.
- Born:
  - Elizabeth McGovern, American film actress and singer; in Evanston, Illinois
  - Neil Friske, American politician and member of the Michigan House of Representatives since 2023
- Died:
  - Alfréd Deésy, 73, Hungarian actor and film director
  - Hod Eller, 67, American baseball pitcher

== July 19, 1961 (Wednesday) ==
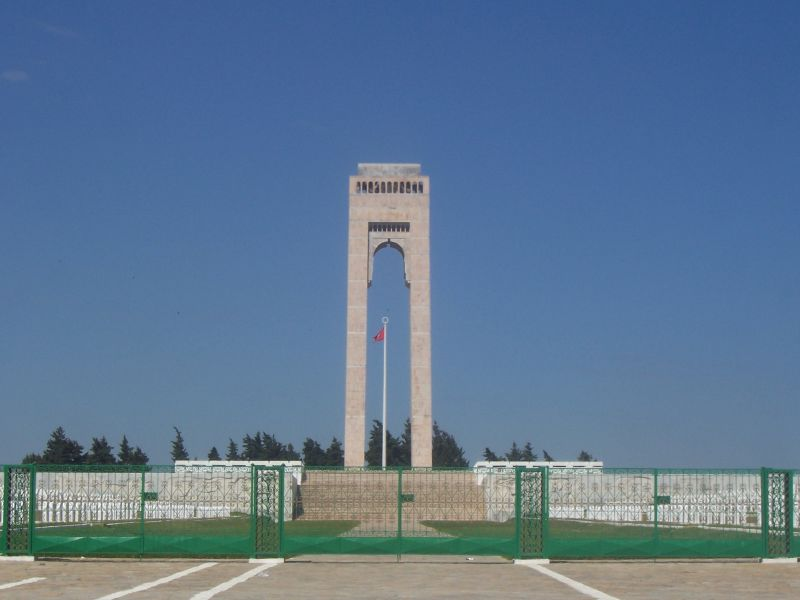
Memorial for 670 killed in French attack on Tunisian protesters

- The Bizerte crisis began when Tunisia sent troops to surround France's naval base at Bizerte, beginning a standoff between the two nations. The demonstration started out peacefully until 2:15 p.m., when ground forces fired at a French Army helicopter flying supplies into the base. France responded by bombing and strafing the Tunisian positions as the two sides exchanged gunfire. Two days later, France attacked the city of Bizerte. French losses were 13 dead and 35 wounded. The Tunisians suffered 670 dead and 1,555 wounded.
- All 67 people on Aerolíneas Argentinas Flight 644 were killed after the DC-6 departed from Buenos Aires to a destination of Comodoro Rivadavia. The plane had been attempting to make an emergency landing at Azul and burst into flames after crashing near Chachari.
- The first regularly scheduled in-flight movie service began, as a TWA flight from New York to Los Angeles showed By Love Possessed to its first-class customers.
- The submarine USS Theodore Roosevelt (SSBN-600) began its first deterrent patrol, loaded with Polaris missiles.
- The first moves were made in the formation of the NATO Tiger Association.
- Born:
  - Harsha Bhogle, Indian cricket commentator and journalist; in Hyderabad, Andhra Pradesh state
  - Noriyuki Abe, Japanese anime storyboard artist, sound director and director; in Kyoto
- Died: Hjalmar Gullberg, 63, Swedish poet, committed suicide

== July 20, 1961 (Thursday) ==
- Meeting in Cairo, the Council of the Arab League voted to admit Kuwait as its 11th member nation, and to send troops to replace the British in protecting the newly independent state from annexation by Iraq. Admission of new members required unanimous approval by the representatives present, but Iraq's Foreign Minister, Hashim Jawad, had made the mistake of boycotting the meeting in protest.
- Three years after Egypt and Syria had merged their governments to form the United Arab Republic, with Egypt's Gamal Abdel Nasser as president, Nasser nationalized Syria's banks, insurance companies, and other private businesses. Nasser's moves to put Syria's economy under his control would prompt the breakup of the UAR two months later.
- Hurricane Anna formed in the Atlantic. The storm would strengthen into a Category 2 hurricane on the modern-day Saffir–Simpson hurricane wind scale before dissipating on July 24, causing one fatality and $300,000 (1961 USD) in damage, mostly in Central America.
- After two years of living and working in Minsk, American defector Lee Harvey Oswald applied to the Soviet Union for an exit visa so that he could return to the United States. He, his wife and daughter were finally granted permission to leave on May 30, 1962.
- What is now the Barzilai Medical Center opened at Ashkelon, Israel, and is named for Yisrael Barzilai.

== July 21, 1961 (Friday) ==
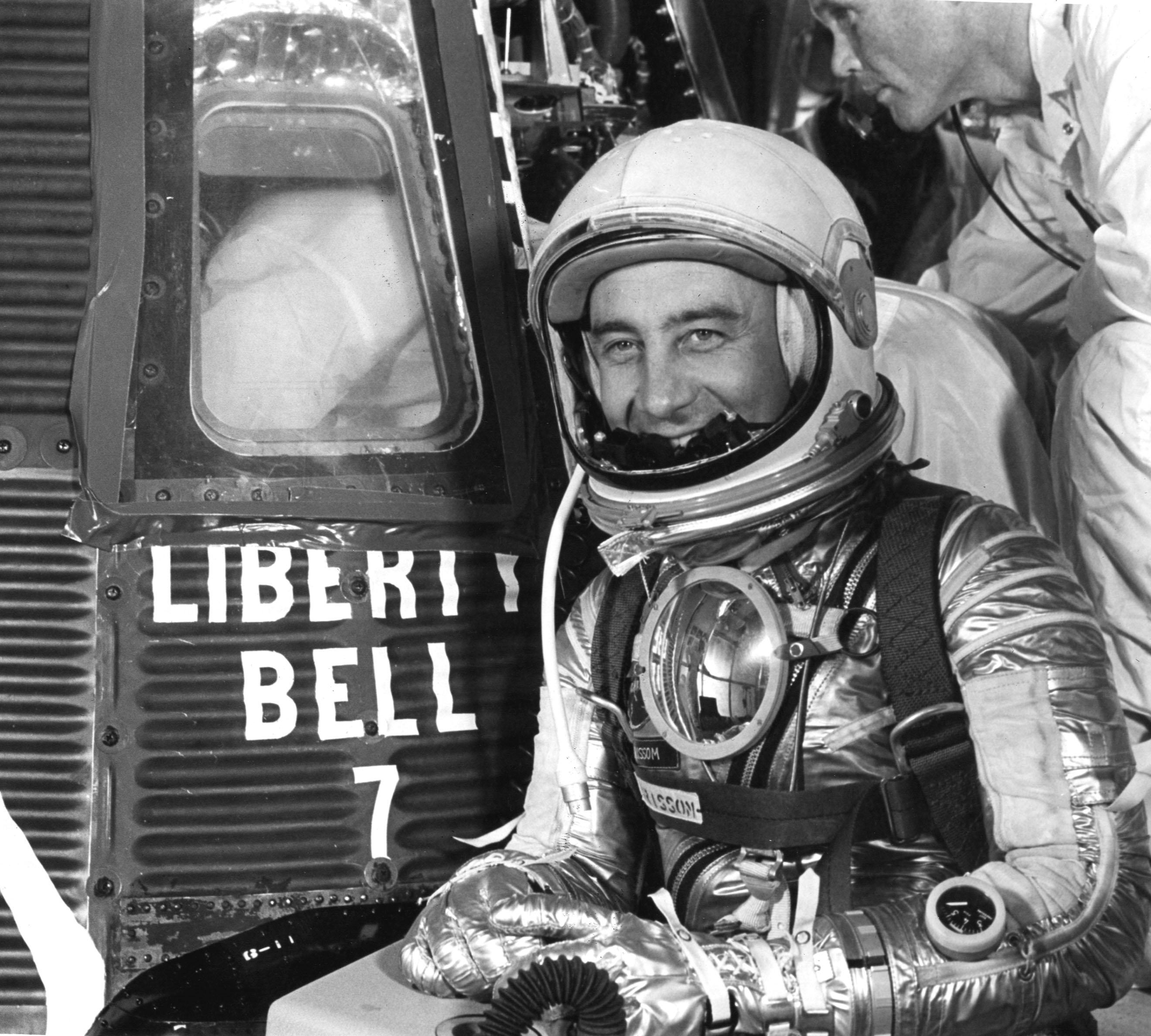
Grissom

- Gus Grissom became the second American astronaut to go into space as he piloted the Mercury 4 capsule Liberty Bell 7 following his launch from Cape Canaveral at 7:20 a.m. From lift-off to reentry, operational sequences were similar to those of the first crewed suborbital flight, Mercury 3. Grissom reached a peak altitude of 118 miles (190 km) without attaining orbit, then descended in his capsule by parachute, with splashdown 303 statute miles downrange from Cape Canaveral at 7:36. Grissom's flight experience was similar to Alan Shepard's in that there was a 5-minute period of weightlessness, and neither reported any ill effects. He also found it easy to manually control his spacecraft attitude. Grissom narrowly escaped drowning when the explosive escape hatch opened prematurely while he was awaiting a helicopter to rescue him, but he escaped and swam to safety. The Liberty Bell 7 capsule sank after filling with water. Although a helicopter managed to secure the capsule and attempted to lift it, the weight of the water added 4,000 pounds (1,800 kg) to the load. The $5,000,000 Mercury spacecraft was cut loose and sank to the bottom of the ocean, and would not be found until May 1999. Grissom almost drowned when water filled his suit, and a 10-foot (3.0 m) long shark was observed in the water soon after his rescue. Grissom would die in 1967, unable to escape the capsule of Apollo 1 when it caught fire. An unidentified NASA official commented, "We've got only one Gus, but we've got plenty of space capsules." After this second successful suborbital flight, Space Task Group decided that there was no need to continue the initial phase of Project Mercury, and the remaining Mercury-Redstone flights were canceled.
- Alaska Airlines Flight 779, a Douglas DC-6 delivering 26,000 pounds (12,000 kg) of cargo to Japan, crashed 300 feet (91 m) short of the runway as it came in for a landing at the Shemya Air Force Base in Alaska, killing the crew of six. An investigation found that the power cable for the runway approach lights, and to many of the pairs of threshold lights and runway lights, had been cut off two days before the accident to allow construction vehicles to pass, and that nobody had notified the crew of Flight 779.
- Dominica adopted a new coat of arms, consisting of a shield with two guardian Sisserou Parrots bracing the shield atop of which is a raging lion.
- Born:
  - Matt Preston, English-Australian food critic, writer, food journalist, television and radio presenter; in London
  - Morris Iemma, Australian politician and Premier of New South Wales from 2005 to 2008; in Sydney
  - Sergiy Bychkov, Ukrainian politician; in Dnipropetrovsk
- Died: Sérvulo Gutiérrez, 47, Peruvian artist

== July 22, 1961 (Saturday) ==
- The Economic Planning Board (EPB) was created by order of South Korean dictator Park Chung Hee, to implement the goals of the Comprehensive Economic Development Five-Year Plan, drafted by three young economists (Kim Song Bom, 37; Paek Yong Chan, 32; and Chong So Yong, 29). South Korea went from being a poor nation to an economic powerhouse; per capita income rose from $80 to $1,000 during Park's 18 years in office. The gross national product, only $2.7 billion when Park took office, is now more than one trillion dollars.
- The British government agreed to pay the government of San Marino the sum of 732,000,000 Italian lira (80,000 British pounds, or at the time US$224,000) as compensation for the erroneous bombing of the republic on June 26, 1944, during a British raid on Italy. The attack on the small (38 square miles (98 km^{2})) republic had killed 59 people and caused extensive damage. San Marino's Grand Council had refused the £80,000 offer in 1946.
- NASA Administrator James E. Webb awarded the NASA Distinguished Service Medal to Gus Grissom, pilot of Liberty Bell 7, as part of the post-mission press conference held at Cape Canaveral.
- The Roman Catholic Diocese of Tilarán and the Roman Catholic Diocese of Huehuetenango were erected.

== July 23, 1961 (Sunday) ==
- The Sandinistas were created by Nicaraguan leftists Carlos Fonseca, Silvio Mayorga, and Tomás Borge, while they were living in Honduras. Fonseca had included the name of Augusto Sandino in the name of the FSLN, the Sandinista National Liberation Front. The FSLN would topple the government of Anastasio Somoza in 1979 and win control of Nicaragua.
- Born:
  - Woody Harrelson, American TV and film actor; in Midland, Texas
  - Martin Gore, English musician and songwriter of the electronic rock band Depeche Mode; in London
  - Michael Durant, American pilot held hostage in Somalia during 1993; in Berlin, New Hampshire
  - Vikram Chandra, Indian novelist; in New Delhi

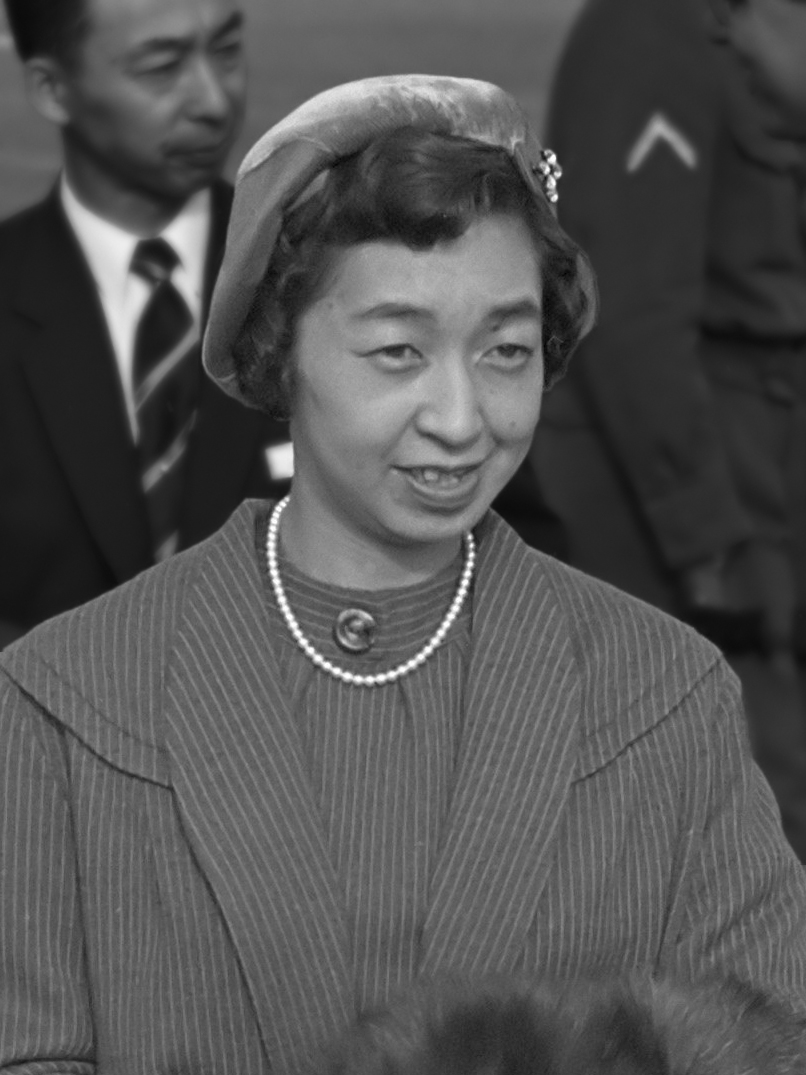
Princess Higashikuni Shigeko of Japan

- Died: Shigeko Higashikuni, 35, formerly Princess Terunomiya of Japan and eldest child of the Emperor Hirohito and Empress Nagako, died of cancer. In 1943, she had married a commoner, Morihito Higashikuni, and renounced her royal status.

== July 24, 1961 (Monday) ==
- Eastern Airlines Flight 202 was hijacked shortly after takeoff from Miami, en route to Tampa. Wilfred Roman Oquendo, a Cuban-born American citizen, who had boarded as "J. Marin" and carried a pistol on board, entered the cockpit and forced the pilot to fly to Cuba. The crew of 5 and the other 32 passengers were allowed to fly back to Miami the next day, while Fidel Castro did not allow the release of the Lockheed L-188 Electra until August 15. Oquendo was indicted for 37 counts of kidnapping by a federal grand jury on August 23, and never returned to the United States.

== July 25, 1961 (Tuesday) ==
- President Kennedy delivered a nationwide address on American television and radio, making clear that if the Soviet Union attempted to take control of West Berlin, then the United States would be prepared to go to war, even at the risk of nuclear annihilation. "We must have sea and air lift capable of moving our forces quickly and in large numbers to any part of the world," said Kennedy, and announced that he was "ordering that our draft calls be doubled and tripled" to expand the U.S. Army from 875,000 to one million men. Kennedy then announced, "We have another sober responsibility. To recognize the possibilities of nuclear war in the missile age, without our citizens knowing what they should do and where they should go if bombs begin to fall, would be a failure of responsibility." To that end, he would ask Congress for funding to identify and stock "fallout shelters in case of attack" and upgrade an emergency warning system, adding that "In the event of an attack, the lives of those families which are not hit in a nuclear blast and fire can still be saved--if they can be warned to take shelter and if that shelter is available." "It was nearly a presidential proclamation of a national emergency," one author would note later, "with the unmistakable implication that nuclear war might be imminent."
- The very last Convair B-36 Peacemaker strategic bomber was dismantled at AMARC, the aircraft boneyard at Davis-Monthan Air Force Base at Tucson, Arizona.
- The Secular Institute of the Scalabrinian Missionary Women was founded by the Missionaries of St. Charles Borromeo.
- Born:
  - Johan H. Andresen, Jr., Norwegian CEO of the Ferd and the wealthiest man in Norway (2008 figures); in Oslo
  - Darren Star, American writer, director and producer of film and television; in Potomac, Maryland

== July 26, 1961 (Wednesday) ==
- Voters in Southern Rhodesia (now Zimbabwe), most of whom were white, approved a new Constitution guaranteeing some representation to the black majority. The results were 41,949 to 21,846 in favor, with the Parliament of Rhodesia having 50 seats for Whites, and 15 for Blacks.
- On a visit to East Germany, Soviet leader Nikita Khrushchev agreed to let DDR leader Walter Ulbricht order construction of the Berlin Wall.
- Born: Dimitris Saravakos, Greek soccer football midfielder with 78 appearances on the national team; in Athens

== July 27, 1961 (Thursday) ==
- McDonnell and NASA personnel met to discuss the proposed 2-astronaut space concept (later designated Project Gemini), which had been introduced in May 1961. Following the meeting, the design effort was concentrated on two versions of the advanced spacecraft, a one-man Mercury that could make 18 orbits and would require minimum changes; and a 2-man spacecraft capable of advanced missions, which would require more radical modifications.
- Cyril I was recognized as the first Patriarch of All Bulgaria since the 14th century, after the Ecumenical Patriarchate of Constantinople decreed the restoration of the office and declared Cyril (Konstantin Konstantinov) to be patriarch.
- In the UK, the Mock Auctions Act 1961 received royal assent.
- Born: Erez Tal, Israeli TV host; in Tel Aviv

== July 28, 1961 (Friday) ==
- The United Kingdom informed its six partners in the European Free Trade Association (EFTA) that it intended to file an application to join the six-member European Economic Community (also known as the EEC or the Common Market). A formal announcement was not made until July 31.
- The first wristwatch made in India, manufactured by Hindustan Machine Tools (HMT), was presented to Prime Minister Jawaharlal Nehru in Bangalore. The company had been set up in collaboration with the Japanese manufacturer Citizen Holdings, maker of the Citizen watch.
- Died: Shigeru Tonomura, 58, Japanese novelist

== July 29, 1961 (Saturday) ==
- KGB Director Alexander Shelepin presented to Soviet leader Nikita Khrushchev the outline for a plan to combat "The Main Adversary", the euphemism for the United States. The Shelepin recommendation, accepted by the Politburo three days later, was to finance popular uprisings in Central American nations and to spread disinformation in the NATO nations. After the end of the Cold War, when secret American and Russian documents were finally declassified, the Shelepin plan would be revealed by retired KGB archivist Vasili Mitrokhin.
- Using an IBM 7090 computer, researchers Daniel Shanks and John W. Wrench, Jr., were able to calculate the value of pi to 100,000 digits for the first time. In 1949, prior to the use of computers, the first 1,120 digits had been found "by hand" using a desk calculator. The same year, the ENIAC computer took 70 hours to reach 2,037 decimal places. The 10,000 mark had been broken in 1957 on an IBM 704 in 100 minutes. The IBM 7090 operation took 8 hours and 43 minutes.
- Country music singer Patsy Cline sang at a concert in Tulsa, Oklahoma, and a recording was made of the live performance. Thirty years after Cline's death in 1963, the tape was purchased at a yard sale. MCA Records bought the rights, enhanced the sound quality, and on July 29, 1997, released it in CD form as Live at the Cimarron Ballroom.
- The islands of Wallis and Futuna, located in the South Pacific Ocean, were accepted as "an integral part of the French Republic" in the form of a single French overseas territory.

== July 30, 1961 (Sunday) ==
- The flights of "El Avion Pirata" ("The Pirate Plane"), a four-engine Lockheed Constellation that had been making smuggling flights into Bolivia with landings at night at El Trompillo Airport in Santa Cruz, were brought to an end when Bolivian Air Force fighter jets intercepted the aircraft and forced it to land. During its escape, the rogue aircraft caused an air force P-51 Mustang to crash, killing its pilot. The crew of four Americans and one Brazilian were all arrested, and the "Constellation Trial" would later cause a political scandal in Bolivia. All five would later escape the country; the vintage airplane is now a tourist attraction in Santa Cruz.
- The Communist Party of the Soviet Union unveiled First Secretary Khrushchev's 20-year program for reform, with 47,000 words printed in nine of the ten pages of the newspaper Pravda and broadcast in a six-hour program on Radio Moscow. Among the promises were that by 1970, the workday would be reduced to six hours, and the USSR would surpass the United States in industrial and agricultural production. By 1980, the plan promised, Soviet workers would enjoy free housing and public utilities, free public transportation, and free meals at schools and at the workplace.
- The first NASCAR race (referred to at the time as the Volunteer 500) at Bristol Motor Speedway, the shortest track on the circuit, was won by Jack Smith (who started the race) and Johnny Allen, who finished after Smith's foot was burned by his car.
- Born:
  - Laurence Fishburne, American stage, film and TV actor; in Augusta, Georgia
  - Víctor Trujillo, Mexican TV and film comedian; in Mexico City
- Died:
  - Domenico Tardini, 73, Vatican Secretary of State since 1958
  - Mamin Kolyu, 81, Bulgarian revolutionary

== July 31, 1961 (Monday) ==
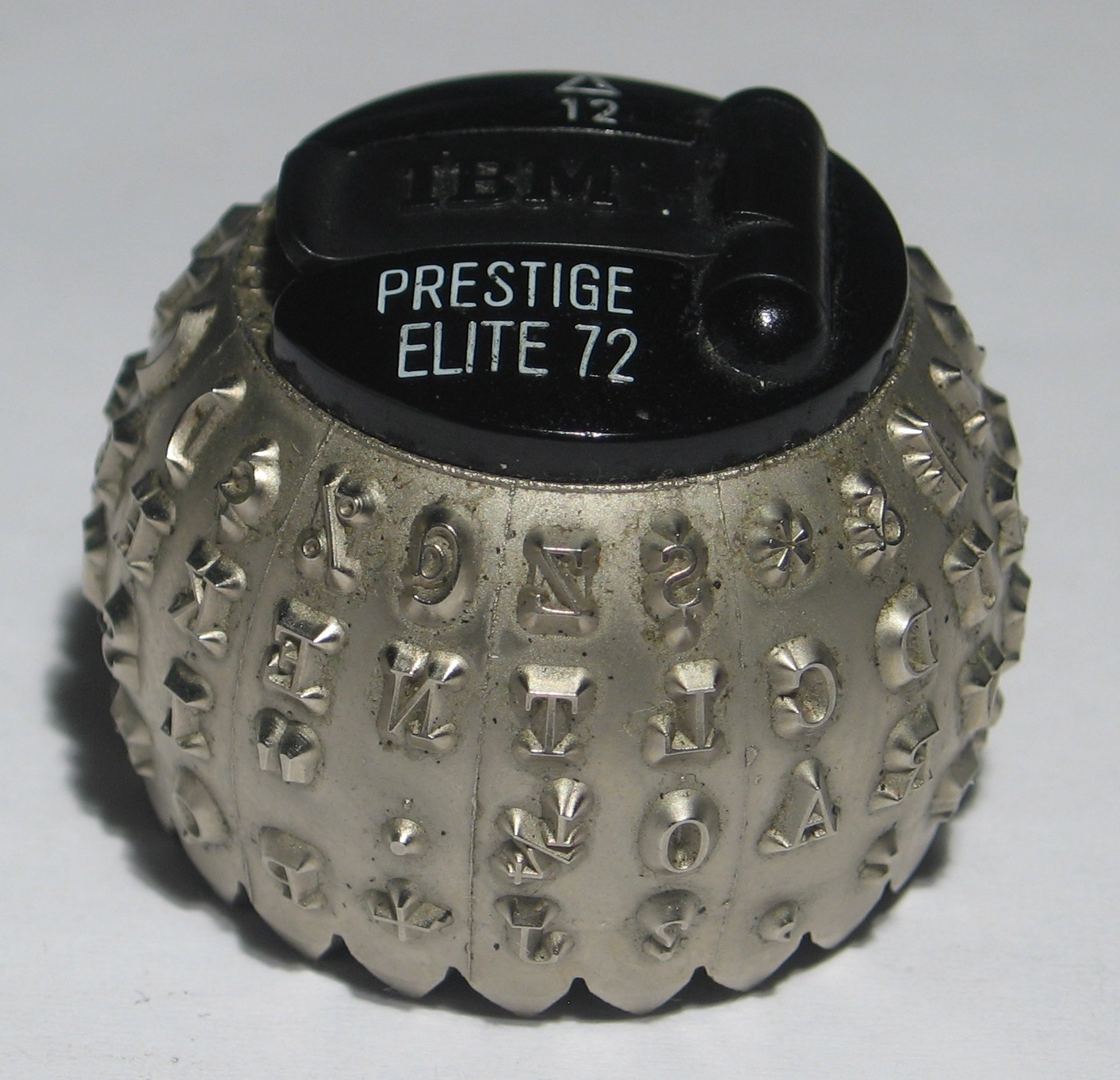
IBM's revolutionary "typeball"

- International Business Machines placed the IBM Selectric typewriter on the market. The "typeball", a sphere with the characters on it, replaced the individual "typebars", and moved along the paper while the carriage stood still, and could be switched out to accommodate different fonts. Initially selling at $395, the Selectric soon became the most popular typewriter in the world, until superseded by the word processor.
- At Fenway Park in Boston, Massachusetts, the annual Major League Baseball All-Star Game ended in a tie for the first time. The game— which also marked the third time that two All-Star Games had been played in the same season— was stopped in the ninth inning due to rain, with the score tied 1–1. Not until 2002 would another MLB All-Star Game end in a tie.
- The classic Japanese monster film Mothra, about a giant moth, premiered in Japanese cinemas as Mosura. The film, which was produced by Toho Co., Ltd, was re-dubbed in English and released in the U.S. in May 1962.
- Jerry Barber won the 1961 PGA Championship at Olympia Fields near Chicago, beating Don January by a single stroke (67 to 68) after the two were forced into a playoff.
- Ireland submitted its first ever application to join the European Economic Community.

== Literature ==
- Kiminas, Demetrius (2009). The Ecumenical Patriarchate: A History of Its Metropolitanates with Annotated Hierarch Catalogs. Wildside Press LLC. ISBN 9781434458766.
