= 1962 Danish Grand Prix =

- Non-championship race in the 1962 Formula One season
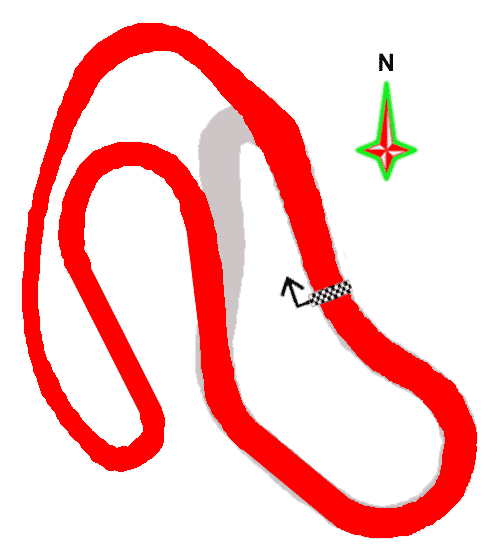

Race details
- Date: 26 August 1962
- Official name: III Grote Prijs van Danske
- Location: Roskilde Ring, Roskilde
- Course: Permanent racing facility
- Course length: 1.19 km (0.74 miles)
- Distance: 1 x 20, 2 x 30 laps, 95.27 km (59.2 miles)

Pole position
Driver	(Australia) Jack Brabham	Lotus-Climax
- Time: 0:43.4

Fastest lap
Driver	(Australia) Jack Brabham	Lotus-Climax
- Time: 0:42.7

Podium
First	(Australia) Jack Brabham	Lotus-Climax
Second	(United States) Masten Gregory	Lotus-BRM
Third	(United Kingdom) Innes Ireland	Lotus-Climax

The III Grote Prijs van Danske (or 3rd Danish Grand Prix) was held on 25–26 August 1962, at the Roskilde Ring circuit, Roskilde, Denmark. The race was a non-Championship Formula One race. It was run over three heats: one of 20 laps and two of 30 laps, and was won overall by Jack Brabham, who won all three heats in his Lotus 24. This race was the first Formula One event for successful Rhodesian motorcycle rider Gary Hocking, who finished 4th overall.

This was the second and last Formula One event to be held at the Roskildering, which was eventually closed in 1969.

== Race summary ==
The first heat saw Brabham win from American Masten Gregory, with Innes Ireland in third. The main incident was an accident involving the Lotus 18 of Jay Chamberlain. Brabham also took the second heat, with Ireland in second this time and John Surtees in third, with Roy Salvadori crashing out this time. Chamberlain returned for the third and final heat, and the first three home in the first heat crossed the line in the same order in the third heat, with a comfortable overall win for Brabham, who also drove the fastest lap.

== Overall results ==
Pos	Driver	Entrant	Constructor	Time/Retired	Qual
1	(Australia) Jack Brabham	Brabham Racing Organisation	Lotus-Climax	59:14.1	1
2	(United States) Masten Gregory	UDT Laystall Racing Team	Lotus-BRM	+ 20.5 s	2
3	(United Kingdom) Innes Ireland	UDT Laystall Racing Team	Lotus-Climax	+ 33.2 s	4
4	(Federation of Rhodesia and Nyasaland) Gary Hocking	Tim Parnell	Lotus-Climax	+ 2:21.3 s	7
5	(United Kingdom) Ian Burgess	Anglo-American Equipe	Cooper-Climax	+ 2:34.1 s	6
6	(United Kingdom) Trevor Taylor	Team Lotus	Lotus-Climax	+ 3:15.5 s	8
7	(Netherlands) Carel Godin de Beaufort	Ecurie Maarsbergen	Porsche	+ 1 lap	9
8	(Germany) Wolfgang Seidel	Autosport Team Wolfgang Seidel	Lotus-BRM	+ 2 laps	11
9	(United States) Jay Chamberlain	Ecurie Excelsior	Lotus-Climax	+ 44 laps (Ret from Heat 1 – Accident)	10
Ret	(United Kingdom) John Surtees	Bowmaker Racing Team	Lola-Climax	Ignition (Heat 3)	3
Ret	(United Kingdom) Roy Salvadori	Bowmaker Racing Team	Lola-Climax	Accident (Heat 2)	5
WD	(United Kingdom) Graham Hill	Rob Walker Racing Team	Lotus-Climax		–
WD	(Germany) Kurt Kuhnke	Kurt Kuhnke	Lotus-Borgward	engine not ready	–

Previous race: 1962 Mediterranean Grand Prix	Formula One non-championship races 1962 season	Next race: 1962 International Gold Cup
Previous race: 1961 Danish Grand Prix	Danish Grand Prix	Next race: 1963 Danish Grand Prix
