= 1961 Danish Grand Prix =

- Non-championship race in the 1961 Formula One season

Race details
- Date: 27 August 1961
- Official name: II Grote Prijs van Danske
- Location: Roskilde Ring, Roskilde
- Course: Permanent racing facility
- Course length: 1.19 km (0.74 miles)
- Distance: 1 × 20, 2 × 30 laps, 95.27 km (59.2 miles)

Pole position
Driver	(United Kingdom) Stirling Moss	Lotus-Climax
- Time: 0:42.8

Fastest lap
Driver	(United Kingdom) Stirling Moss	Lotus-Climax
- Time: 0:47.0 / 0:42.8 / 0:43.1

Podium
First	(United Kingdom) Stirling Moss	Lotus-Climax
Second	(United Kingdom) Innes Ireland	Lotus-Climax
Third	(United Kingdom) Roy Salvadori	Cooper-Climax

The II Grote Prijs van Danske (or 2nd Danish Grand Prix) was held on 26–27 August 1961, at the Roskilde Ring circuit, Roskilde, Denmark. The race was a non-Championship event run for cars complying with Formula One rules. The race was run over three heats, one of 20 laps and two of 30 laps, and was won overall by Stirling Moss, who won all three heats in his Lotus 18/21.

This was the first Formula One event to be held at the Roskildering, which was eventually closed in 1969. The first heat was held on the 26 August, a Saturday, with the final two heats on the Sunday.

== Race summary ==
The first heat saw Moss win by two tenths of a second from Australian Jack Brabham, with Innes Ireland in third. Moss also took the second heat, with Ireland in second this time, and Roy Salvadori in third, with Brabham retiring with gearbox failure. Jim Clark retired from the second heat but returned for the third. The first three home in the second heat crossed the line in the same order in the third heat, with an easy overall win for Moss, who, having claimed pole at the beginning of the proceedings, also drove the fastest lap in all three heats.

== Overall results ==
Pos	Driver	Entrant	Constructor	Time/Retired	Qual
1	(United Kingdom) Stirling Moss	UDT Laystall Racing Team	Lotus-Climax	59:28.5	1
2	(United Kingdom) Innes Ireland	Team Lotus	Lotus-Climax	+ 1:14.0 s	5
3	(United Kingdom) Roy Salvadori	Yeoman Credit Racing Team	Cooper-Climax	+ 2:06.8 s	6
4	(United Kingdom) Henry Taylor	UDT Laystall Racing Team	Lotus-Climax	+ 2:53.9 s	4
5	(United Kingdom) Tim Parnell	Tim Parnell	Lotus-Climax	+ 3:19.4 s	7
6	(United Kingdom) Keith Greene	Gilby Engineering	Gilby-Climax	+ 4:31.6 s	10
7	(United Kingdom) Jim Clark	Team Lotus	Lotus-Climax	60 laps (Ret from Heat 2 - Steering)	11
Ret	(United Kingdom) John Surtees	Yeoman Credit Racing Team	Cooper-Climax	Cam follower (DNS Heat 3)	3
Ret	(Australia) Jack Brabham	Jack Brabham	Cooper-Climax	Gearbox (Heat 2)	2
Ret	(United States) Masten Gregory	UDT Laystall Racing Team	Lotus-Climax	Gearbox (Heat 2)	8
Ret	(Netherlands) Carel Godin de Beaufort	Ecurie Maarsbergen	Porsche	Puncture (Heat 2)	9
WD	(Belgium) Lucien Bianchi	Equipe Nationale Belge	Lotus-Climax	No car	-

Previous race: 1961 Kanonloppet	Formula One non-championship races 1961 season	Next race: 1961 Modena Grand Prix
Previous race: 1960 Danish Grand Prix	Danish Grand Prix	Next race: 1962 Danish Grand Prix
