= Danish Grand Prix =

Former auto race held at Roskilde Ring

- Jyllands-Ringen

Race information
- Number of times held: 13
- First held: 1960
- Last held: 1995
- Most wins (drivers): (Denmark) Jac Nellemann (4)
- Most wins (constructors): (United Kingdom) Cooper (3)
- Circuit length: 2.300 km (1.429 miles)

Last race (1995)

Pole position

Podium
- 1. (Finland) Toni Teittinen; Reynard-Honda

Fastest lap

The Danish Grand Prix was an auto race for open-wheel cars. Last held for Formula One cars in 1962, the race is now defunct.

The Danish Grand Prix was held at the Roskilde Ring circuit near Roskilde. By standards of the era, the circuit was very small, at just three-quarters of a mile for the lap. Formula One cars were completing the lap in just over 42 seconds. The circuit ultimately limited the growth potential of the race, and the event was not considered to be added to the World Drivers Championship, but during its relatively short life in the 1960s, it did stage some memorable races.

Unusually for the time, the Grand Prix was actually decided over a series of heats, either four or three in number. The original race in 1960 was a Formula Two race won by Jack Brabham in a Cooper-Climax. The meeting was marred though by the death of emerging New Zealander George Lawton. The following year the race was upgraded to Formula One regulations and Stirling Moss took the win for the UDT Laystall Racing Team in a Lotus-Climax. Brabham returned to the top of the podium in 1962 running his own team driving a Lotus-Climax.

In 2017, a proposal to revive the race was put forward. Starting in 2020, the proposed event would be held on a street circuit in the Indre By and Christianshavn areas of Copenhagen and was designed by former Formula One driver Jan Magnussen and circuit architect Hermann Tilke.

== Winners of the Danish Grand Prix ==
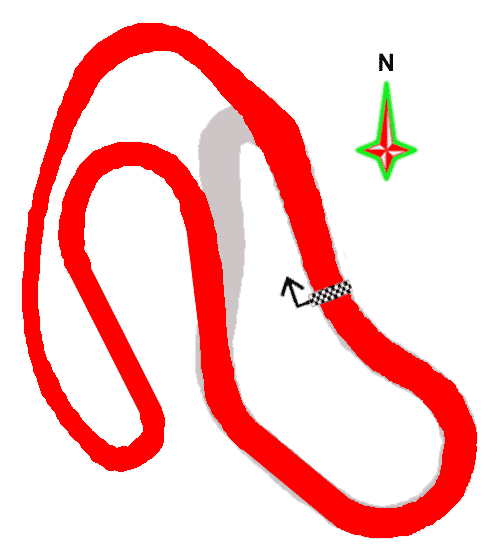
Roskilde Ring (1960–1965, 1968)

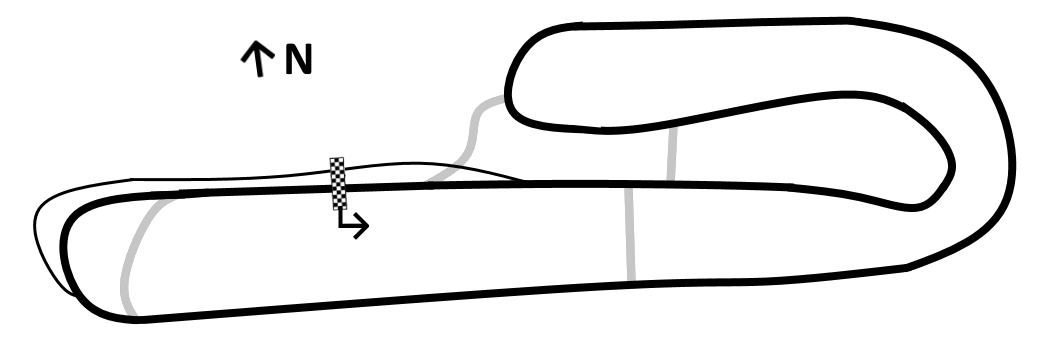
Ring Djursland (1973)

Year	Driver	Constructor	Location	Formula	Report
1960	(Australia) Jack Brabham	Cooper-Climax	Roskilde Ring	Formula Two	Report
1961	(United Kingdom) Stirling Moss	Lotus-Climax	Roskilde Ring	Formula One	Report
1962	(Australia) Jack Brabham	Lotus-Climax	Roskilde Ring	Formula One	Report
1963	(United States) Peter Revson	Cooper-BMC	Roskilde Ring	Formula Junior	Report
1964	(Denmark) Hartvig Conradsen	Cooper-BMC	Roskilde Ring	Formula Junior	Report
1965	(West Germany) Kurt Ahrens Jr.	Brabham-Ford	Roskilde Ring	Formula Three	Report
1968	(Sweden) Ingvar Pettersson	Tecno-Ford	Roskilde Ring	Formula Three	Report
1973	(United States) Randy Lewis	Brabham-Ford	Ring Djursland	Formula Three	Report
1974	(Denmark) Jac Nellemann	GRD-Ford	Jyllandsringen	Formula Three	Report
1975	(Denmark) Jac Nellemann	GRD-Ford	Jyllandsringen	Formula Three	Report
1976	(Denmark) Jac Nellemann	Van Diemen-Toyota	Jyllandsringen	Formula Three	Report
1977	(Denmark) Jac Nellemann	Chevron-Toyota	Jyllandsringen	Formula Three	Report
1995	(Finland) Toni Teittinen	Reynard-Mugen-Honda	Jyllandsringen	Formula Three	Report
1995	(Finland) Toni Teittinen	Reynard-Mugen-Honda	Jyllandsringen	Formula Three	Report
