= Roskilde Ring =

Motor racing circuit in Roskilde, Denmark

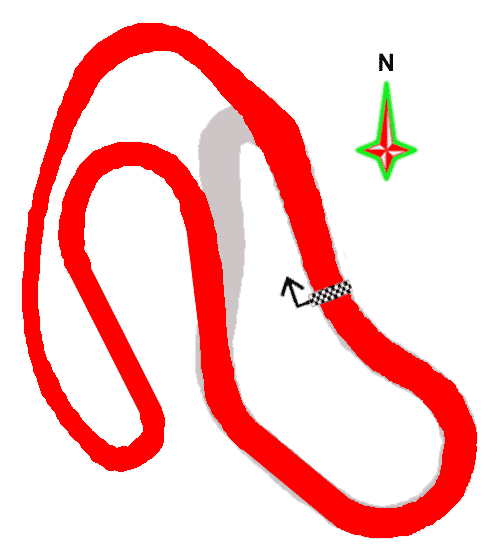
- Grand Prix Circuit (1957–1968)

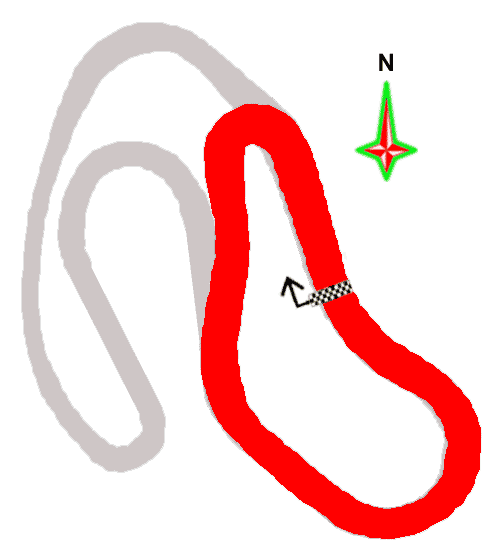
- Original Circuit (1955–1958)
- Location: Roskilde, Denmark
- Coordinates: 55°37′56″N 12°04′51″E
- Broke ground: 1954
- Opened: 5 June 1955; 71 years ago
- Closed: 14 April 1969; 57 years ago
- Major events: Danish Grand Prix (1960–1965, 1968)

Grand Prix Circuit (1957–1968)
- Length: 1.191 km (0.740 mi)
- Turns: 8
- Race lap record: 0:42.00 ( (Sweden) Reine Wisell, Tecno 68, 1968, F3)

Original Circuit (1955–1958)
- Length: 0.670 km (0.416 mi)
- Turns: 4

Roskilde Ring was a motor racing circuit in Roskilde, Denmark. It hosted the Danish Grand Prix between 1960 and 1962, with non-championship Formula One races in the last two years which were won by Stirling Moss and Jack Brabham.

== History ==
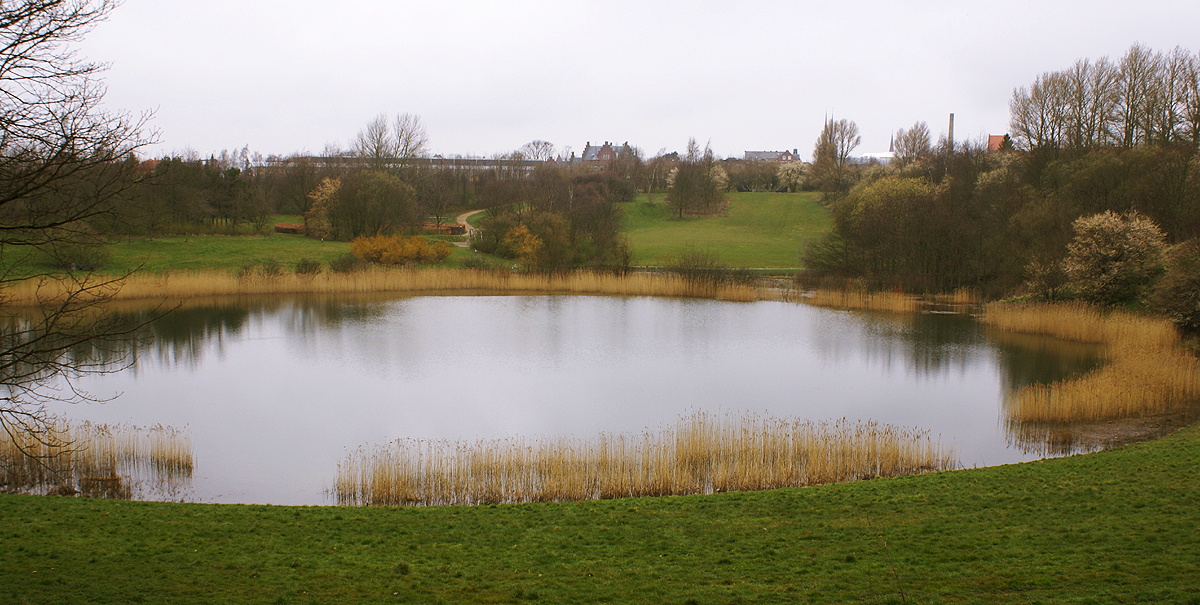
Roskilde Ring as it is today. A pond is where the paddock once stood.

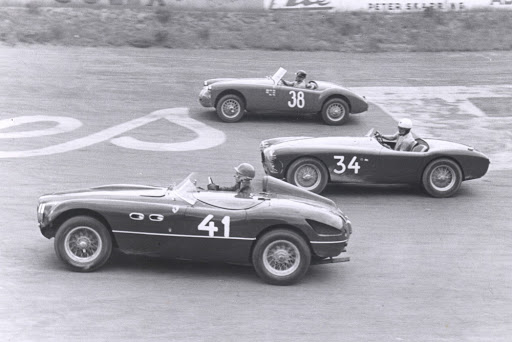
Three competitors at Roskilde on 17 August 1957

The circuit was opened in 1955 by Businessman Paul Tholstrup as a short 0.670 km (0.416 mi) track, becoming Denmark's first permanent road circuit. The layout was a banked oval, utilizing the steep sides of the old gravel pit which the circuit was built on. In 1957 the track was extended, using waste land which existed between the circuit and the rail track to the west. This created the still relatively short 1.191 km (0.740 mi) grand prix circuit. Typical for this circuit, described by Stirling Moss as "a most peculiar raceway", were the banked corners and the fact that the circuit did not have a real straight. Because the track was built in an old gravel pit it looks like an amphitheater. There was also an elevation of 14 m (46 ft) and the track was driven anticlockwise.

The Roskilde Ring was located close to the center of Roskilde, with new residential developments surrounding the circuit. The last race on the track was Scalextric-Löbet, which was held on 22 September 1968. Due to the high number of complaints about the noise created, it was closed on 14 April 1969. After closing the site was turned into a park. A hotel has been built where the race control tower stood.

== Lap records ==
The fastest official race lap records at the Roskilde Ring are listed as:

| Category | Time | Driver | Vehicle | Event |
Grand Prix Circuit (1957–1968): 1.191 km (0.740 mi)
| Formula Three | 0:42.000 | Reine Wisell | Tecno 68 | 1968 Scalextric-Löbet |
| Formula One | 0:42.700 | Jack Brabham | Lotus 24 | 1962 Danish Grand Prix |
| Formula Two | 0:43.200 | Graham Hill | Lotus 18 | 1960 Danish Grand Prix |
| Formula Junior | 0:43.700 | Peter Arundell | Lotus 22 | 1962 Copenhagen Cup |
| Sports car racing | 0:46.200 | Stirling Moss (Note: Both drivers took the same lap time independently.); David Piper | Cooper Monaco T49; Lotus 15 | 1959 Roskilde Ring Sports Car race |
