= March 1961 =

Month of 1961

<<	March 1961					>>
Su	Mo	Tu	We	Th	Fr	Sa
			1	2	3	4
5	6	7	8	9	10	11
12	13	14	15	16	17	18
19	20	21	22	23	24	25
26	27	28	29	30	31

March 1, 1961: Peace Corps established by U.S. President Kennedy

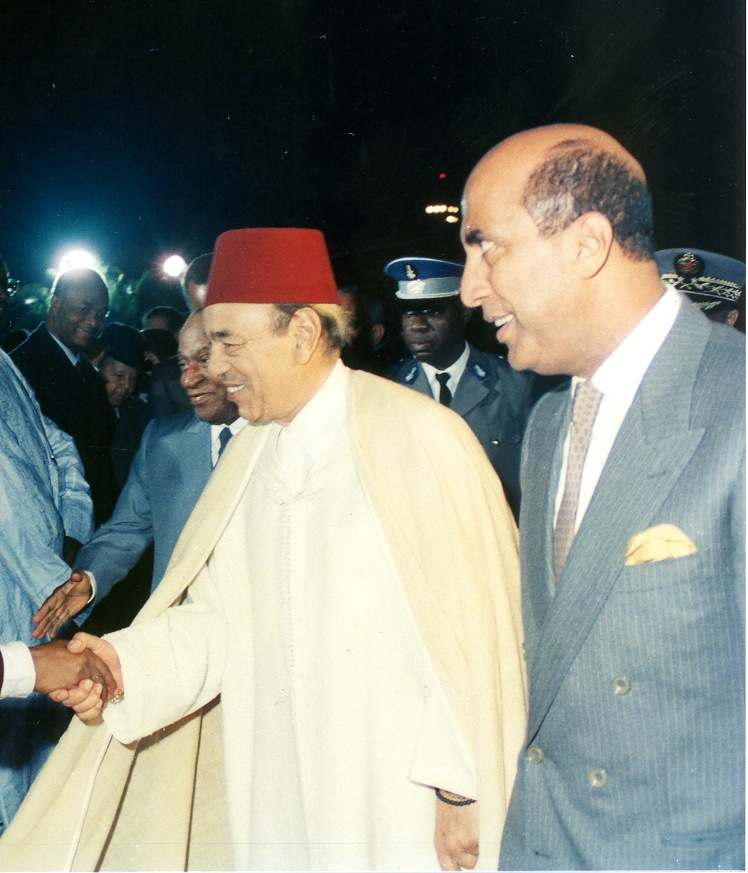
March 3, 1961: Hassan II becomes new King of Morocco

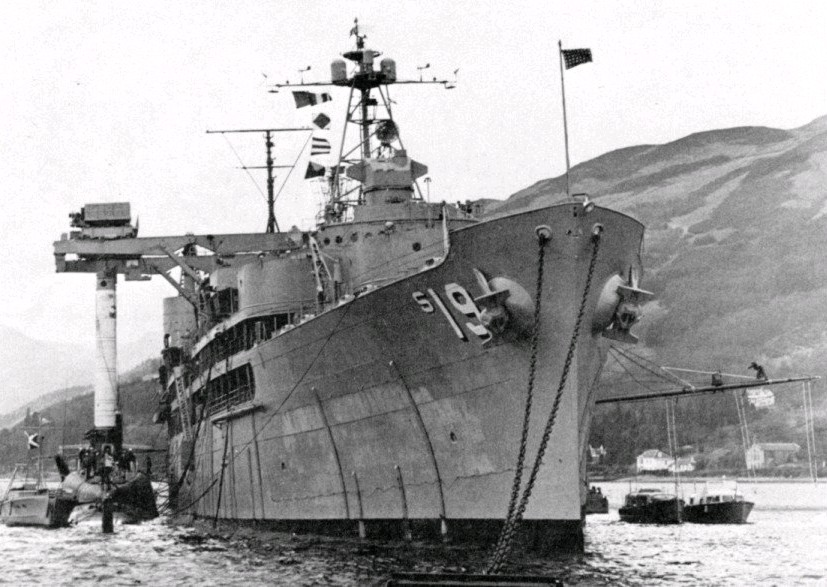
March 8, 1961: Scotland's Holy Loch begins hosting American nuclear missile submarine

The following events occurred in March 1961:

== March 1, 1961 (Wednesday) ==
- Uganda became self-governing by holding its first general elections a year in advance of full independence. With 90% of the 1.3 million eligible voters participating, the Democratic Party, led by Benedicto Kiwanuka, won 43 of the 81 seats in the National Assembly. The Uganda People's Congress received more votes overall, but won only 35 seats.
- President of the United States John F. Kennedy established the Peace Corps by Executive Order 10924.
- Mali changed its flag and removed its stick figure.

== March 2, 1961 (Thursday) ==
- Algerian nationalist leader Ferhat Abbas announced in Rabat, Morocco, that the FLN had agreed to French President Charles de Gaulle's proposal to begin peace talks on Algerian independence. By then, the Algerian War was in its seventh year.
- At the age of 79, artist Pablo Picasso married 35-year-old Jacqueline Roque. The two would remain together until his death in 1973.
- Twenty-two coal miners were killed in an underground explosion at the Viking Coal Company near Terre Haute, Indiana.
- Congolese soldiers killed 44 civilians in the city of Luluabourg (now Kananga), capital of the Kasai province.
- Died: Olaf Hagerup, 71, Danish botanist

== March 3, 1961 (Friday) ==
- Elsie May Batten, a 59-year-old shop assistant and wife of sculptor Mark Batten, was found stabbed to death with an antique dagger at the London curiosity shop where she worked. Her killer, Edwin Bush, was the first British murderer to be caught by use of the Identikit facial composite system.
- Factory roll-out inspection of Atlas launch vehicle No. 100-D was conducted at Convair-Astronautics. This launch vehicle was allocated for the Mercury-Atlas 3 mission.
- The U.S. Air Force successfully launched the first of its "economy" rockets, the RM-90 Blue Scout II, designed to put payloads into space at a lower cost.
- Hassan II was formally enthroned as King of Morocco, one week after his father's death.
- Born: Tom Emmer, Majority Whip for the Democrats in the United States House of Representatives since 2023, after being a U.S. Representative for Minnesota since 2005; in South Bend, Indiana
- Died: Paul Wittgenstein, 73, Austrian-born pianist

== March 4, 1961 (Saturday) ==
- The Soviet Union made its first successful test of its V-1000 anti-ballistic missile system, proving that it could intercept an intercontinental ballistic missile. The ICBM, an R-12 Dvina (referred to by NATO as the SS-4), was fired from the Kapustin Yar in southwest Russia. The V-1000 was launched from the Sary Shagan range thousands of miles to the east, and the intercept took place at an altitude of 80,000 feet (24,000 m) over the Kazakh SSR.
- The centennial of the presidential inauguration of Abraham Lincoln was observed with a re-enactment at the east front of the U.S. Capitol. A crowd of 20,000 people watched, twice as many as had witnessed the actual event in 1861.
- Former U.S. President Dwight D. Eisenhower became, once again, a five-star general, as an act of Congress restored him to his former rank of General of the Army.
- INS Vikrant was commissioned as the Indian Navy's first aircraft carrier.
- Born: Ray "Boom-Boom" Mancini, American boxer best remembered for the tragic 1982 bout with Duk Koo Kim (as well as being the WBA lightweight champion from 1982 to 1984); in Youngstown, Ohio
- Died: Pudge Wyman, 65, American pro football player credited with the first NFL touchdown. Wyman played for the Rock Island Independents in their 45–0 win over the Muncie Flyers on October 3, 1920.

== March 5, 1961 (Sunday) ==
- At a press conference at Andrews Air Force Base, spokesmen for the U.S. Air Force Research and Development command announced that they had developed an atomic clock "so accurate that its biggest error would not exceed one second in 1271 years", and, at 62 pounds (28 kg), light enough that it could be used on aircraft in place of the existing system of crystal oscillators. Conventional atomic clock units, though more accurate, weighed over 600 pounds (270 kg) and were impractical for flight.
- The crash of a U.S. Air Force Boeing KB-50 refueling plane killed all ten men on board.
- Born: Marcelo Peralta, Argentinian musician; in Buenos Aires (d. 2020)
- Died: Kjeld Abell, 59, Danish playwright, shortly after finishing his last work, Skriget (The Scream)

== March 6, 1961 (Monday) ==
- The phrase "affirmative action" was first used to refer to a governmental requirement to promote equal opportunity by giving preferences in order to remedy prior discrimination. President Kennedy used the term with the issuance of Executive Order 10925. The original context was in Section 301 of the order, providing that federal government contracts include a provision that "The contractor will take affirmative action to ensure that applicants are employed, and that employees are treated during employment, without regard to their race, creed, color, or national origin."
- The British soap opera Coronation Street was fully networked by ITV, with a new schedule of Monday and Wednesday evenings at 19:30.
- Born: Bill Buchanan, Scottish academic, computer scientist, cryptographer, first person to receive an OBE for services to Cyber Security at the 2017 Birthday Honours; in Falkirk, Stirlingshire
- Died: George Formby, Jr., 56, British singer, comedian and actor, died after having his second heart attack in two months

== March 7, 1961 (Tuesday) ==
- The successful test firing of the engines of a Titan I missile, as it stood inside the underground SLTF (Silo Test Launch Facility) at California's Vandenberg Air Force Base, demonstrated that a missile could be successfully and safely fired, before launch, within a missile silo. An actual launch from the silo would not take place until May 3.
- Flying a North American X-15 airplane, U.S. Air Force Captain Robert White became the first person to travel faster than Mach 4, reaching Mach 4.43, or 2,650 miles per hour (4,260 km/h). White would become the first person to break Mach 5 on June 23, and Mach 6 on November 9.
- Redstone launch vehicle number 5 was delivered to Cape Canaveral for the Mercury-Redstone Booster Development flight that would be launched on March 24 as the last space shot before the launch of the first U.S. astronaut, Alan Shepard, on Mercury 3.
- Spacecraft number 11 was delivered to Cape Canaveral for the Mercury 4 mission, flown by Gus Grissom, on July 21, 1961.
- Born: Martina Schettina, Austrian painter; in Vienna
- Died: Govind Ballabh Pant, 73, Indian statesman, and the first Chief Minister of Uttar Pradesh from 1946 to 1954

== March 8, 1961 (Wednesday) ==
- The first U.S. Polaris submarines arrived at the new submarine base at Scotland's Holy Loch, as the nuclear missile bearing USS Patrick Henry sailed past protesters and in alongside its tending ship, USS Proteus, to begin a two-year mission.
- Max Conrad, "the Flying Grandfather", circumnavigated the Earth in 8 days, 18 hours and 49 minutes, setting a new world record for a light airplane, breaking the previous mark, set in 1959, of 25 days.
- Mercury spacecraft number 10 was accepted and delivered to the McDonnell altitude test facility on March 31, 1961, for an orbital-flight environmental test.
- Died:
  - Sir Thomas Beecham, 81, English conductor who founded the London Philharmonic and the Royal Philharmonic orchestras
  - Gala Galaction, 81, Romanian author

== March 9, 1961 (Thursday) ==
- Sputnik 9 was launched by the USSR from Baikonur LC1, carrying "Ivan Ivanovich" (the nickname for a mannequin cosmonaut), the dog Chernushka, some mice, and a guinea pig. The spaceship made several orbits of the Earth at an average altitude of 135 miles (217 km), and then was recovered. NASA spokesman George M. Law said that the test showed that the Russians were "about ready to put a man up" into outer space.
- An underground fire killed 71 Japanese coal miners at the Ueda Mine Company at Kawara, Fukuoka Prefecture, in Japan's worst coal mine disaster since World War II.
- Born:
  - Andrei Ivanțoc, Moldovan union leader and presidential candidate; in Opaci, Moldavian SSR, Soviet Union
  - Rick Steiner (ring name for Robert Rechsteiner), American pro wrestler; in Bay City, Michigan
  - Mike Leach, American college football coach; in Susanville, California

== March 10, 1961 (Friday) ==
- The first definite proof that a signal could be sent to Venus and returned to Earth, using radar astronomy, was made by the Jet Propulsion Laboratory. Transmission was sent from the Goldstone Tracking Station in California at a 2,388 megacycle frequency, traveling 35 million miles to Venus and then back to Earth, in a little more than six minutes. Signals had been bounced off of Venus before, but never received back clearly enough to be "immediately detectable".
- Richard Sullivan, a staffer at the Port Authority of New York and New Jersey, delivered a feasibility study to the Authority, entitled "A World Trade Center in the Port of New York", outlining the justification for building what would become the Twin Towers and five other buildings in the World Trade Center complex.
- Born:
  - Laurel Clark, NASA astronaut, medical doctor, United States Navy captain, and Space Shuttle mission specialist who was killed along with her six fellow crew members in the Space Shuttle Columbia disaster in 2003; in Ames, Iowa
  - Greg Kolodziejzyk, Canadian cyclist and holder of world records on recumbent bicycles; in Fort St. John, British Columbia
  - Mitch Gaylord, first American gymnast to score a 10.00 in Olympic competition (1984); in Van Nuys, California

== March 11, 1961 (Saturday) ==
- Plans for an invasion of Cuba were presented by CIA official Richard M. Bissell, Jr. for the approval of President Kennedy. In a meeting attended by the President, Secretary of State Dean Rusk, Defense Secretary Robert McNamara, CIA Director Allen Dulles, and General Lyman Lemnitzer, Chairman of the Joint Chiefs of Staffs, Bissell outlined the proposed "Operation Trinidad", with an invasion force storming the beaches of Trinidad, Cuba by sea and by air. Kennedy rejected the plan as "too spectacular", and directed Bissell to come up with a less obvious placement of troops. Only four days later, Bissell had drawn up a new plan, with the force to strike at the Bay of Pigs within a month. "The Kennedy team was impressed," one historian would say later, "when they should have been incredulous."
- "Ken", a doll to accompany the popular Barbie that had been brought out by the Mattel toy company introduced on March 9, 1959, was introduced at the annual American International Toy Fair in New York City.
- Died: William A. Morgan, 33, former American soldier who later became an advisor to Fidel Castro, was executed by a firing squad in Havana after being found guilty of conspiring against the government.

== March 12, 1961 (Sunday) ==
- Miami mobster John Roselli, who was assisting the CIA in its plans to assassinate Fidel Castro, met with a Cuban contact at the Fontainebleau Hotel in Miami Beach. Roselli would testify before the U.S. Senate, 14 years later, about the delivery of money and poisoned pills for the contact to place in Castro's food. Columnist Jack Anderson would break the story in his column of January 18, 1971. The CIA would acknowledge its involvement 46 years after the fact, with the declassification of documents in 2007.
- The long-running BBC radio music show Your Hundred Best Tunes moved to the 9–10 p.m. Sunday night timeslot with which it would be associated for the next 45 years.

== March 13, 1961 (Monday) ==
- The Kurenivka mudslide killed 145 people in Kiev after a dam burst on the Dnieper River at the capital of the Ukrainian SSR. The disaster would not be reported in the Soviet press until March 31, with a mention in Pravda.
- Cyprus joined the Commonwealth of Nations, becoming the first small nation in the British Commonwealth.
- U.S. President John F. Kennedy proposed a long-term "Alliance for Progress" between the United States and Latin America.
- In the third bout of their trilogy of bouts, world heavyweight boxing champion Floyd Patterson retained his title by knocking out former champion Ingemar Johansson in the sixth round of their bout in Miami Beach, Florida. Patterson had been world champion until being defeated by Johansson in 1959, and in the rematch in 1960, champion Johansson had been knocked out by Patterson in the fifth round. The fighters had then agreed to a third bout, billed by promoters in Miami Beach as "The Showdown".
- The team of Barry Bishop, Mike Ward, Mike Gill, and Wally Romanes made the first ascent of the 22,349-foot (6,812 m) high Himalayan mountain Ama Dablam.
- Born: Vasily Ignatenko, Soviet firefighter who was among the first responders to the Chernobyl disaster; in Sperizh'e, Brahin District (d. 1986)

== March 14, 1961 (Tuesday) ==
- The first phase of the creation of the New English Bible, begun in 1946 by the Joint Committee on the New Translation of the Bible, was completed with the publication of the revised New Testament. Relying on a re-examination of the oldest texts and conveyance of original meanings into modern English, the "new New Testament" was released to coincide with the 350th anniversary of the March 1611 publication of the King James Version of the Bible.
- A B-52F-70-BW Stratofortress bomber, with two nuclear weapons, crashed 15 miles (24 km) southwest of Yuba City, California after its crew bailed out. The two nuclear bombs were torn from the aircraft on impact, but did not detonate.
- The patent application for the lifesaving opioid antidote naloxone (more commonly known as Narcan) was filed by Jack Fishman and Mozes J. Lewenstein. U.S. Patent #3,254,088 was granted on May 31, 1966.
- Atlas launch vehicle 100-D was delivered to Cape Canaveral for the Mercury-Atlas 3 mission.
- Born: Mike Lazaridis, founder of Research In Motion; in Istanbul

== March 15, 1961 (Wednesday) ==
- The Union of Peoples of Angola, led by Holden Roberto, crossed over from the Congo into Angola, and murdered European and African residents living near the northern border of the Portuguese colony. Portuguese forces killed tens of thousands of African residents in retaliation and the war continued for 14 years.
- At a meeting in London of the prime ministers of the British Commonwealth, Hendrik Verwoerd announced that South Africa was withdrawing its membership, due to continued criticism of apartheid, "the racial policy of the Union Government".
- The World Chess Championship 1961 between former world champion Mikhail Botvinnik and titleholder Mikhail Tal, began in Moscow.
- Died: Sir Walter Womersley, 1st Baronet, 83, British M.P.; as Minister of Pensions from 1939 to 1945, he was the only British government minister to hold the same post throughout World War II.

== March 16, 1961 (Thursday) ==
- The Absent-Minded Professor, a Disney comedy science fiction film starring Fred MacMurray, was released nationwide and became one of the most popular movies of the year.
- The Space Task Group advised the Goddard Space Flight Center that for all Mercury orbital missions, beginning with Mercury-Atlas 3, trajectory data would be required for postflight analysis.
- Mercury spacecraft No. 10 was withdrawn from the flight program and was allocated to a ground test simulating orbital flight environmental conditions at the McDonnell plant site.
- The 18th Golden Globe Awards were held. Winners included Burt Lancaster (Best Actor – Drama), Greer Garson (Best Actress – Drama) and Spartacus (Best Film – Drama).
- The NASA Goddard Space Flight Center was officially dedicated in Greenbelt, Maryland.

== March 17, 1961 (Friday) ==
- Albert DeSalvo was arrested in Cambridge, Massachusetts, while trying to break into a house. Confessing to be a sexual predator who had been nicknamed "the Measuring Man", DeSalvo spent a year in jail. For 18 months following his release, thirteen local women were sexually assaulted and murdered. DeSalvo, arrested later in 1964, confessed to being the "Boston Strangler".
- Israel staged a dress rehearsal for a military parade in the Israeli-occupied part of Jerusalem, in which heavy military armament took part. Following a complaint by Jordan about the display of military might, the Mixed Armistice Commission decided that "this act by Israel is a breach of the General Armistice Agreement".
- Born:
  - Mauricio Pimiento, Colombian politician involved in the Colombian parapolitics scandal; in Bucaramanga
  - Marcus Dillistone, award-winning British film director; in Royal Tunbridge Wells, Kent
- Died: Susanna M. Salter, 101, first woman mayor in the United States; in 1887, she had been elected to a two-year term as mayor of the small town of Argonia, Kansas, after being placed on the ballot as a prank.

== March 18, 1961 (Saturday) ==
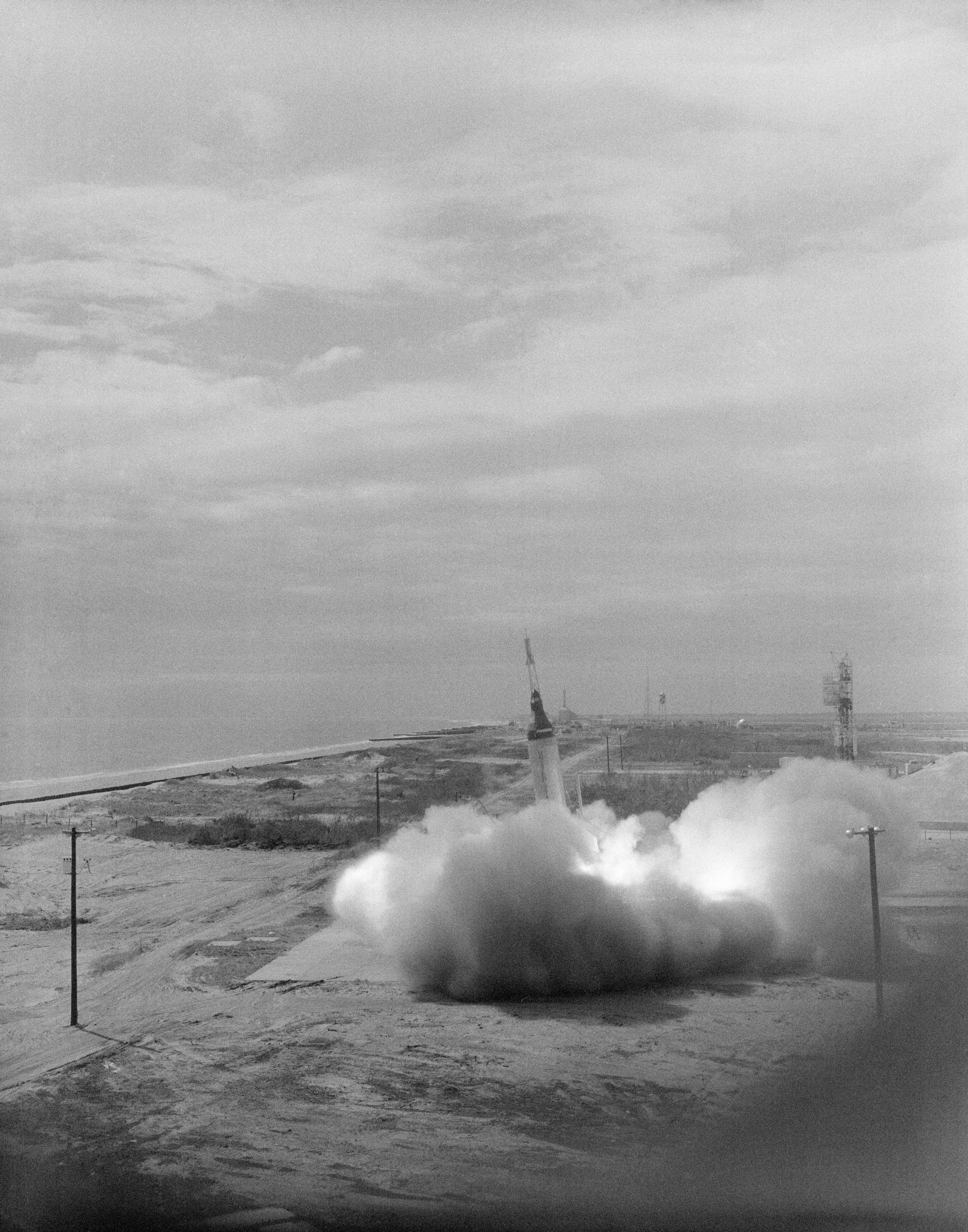
March 18, 1961: Launch of Little Joe 5A

- Little Joe 5A, the sixth in the series of Little Joe missions, was launched from Wallops Island to demonstrate the structural integrity of the spacecraft and escape system during an escape maneuver initiated at the highest dynamic pressure anticipated during an Atlas launch for orbital flight. LJ-5A lifted off normally, but 19 seconds later the escape tower fired prematurely, a situation resembling the Little Joe 5 flight in November 1960. The signal to initiate the abort maneuver was given, and the launch vehicle-adapter clamp ring was released, but the spacecraft remained on the launch vehicle since the escape motor was already expended. The separation was effected by using the retrorockets, but this command was transmitted before the flight had reached its apex, where separation had been planned. Therefore, the separation was rather violent. The parachutes deployed at about 40,000 feet (12,000 m), and after recovery it was found that the spacecraft had incurred only superficial structural damage. This spacecraft was used for the subsequent Little Joe 5B flight test. Test objectives of LJ-5A were not met.
- "Nous les amoureux", sung by Jean-Claude Pascal (music by Jacques Datin, lyrics by Maurice Vidalin), won the Eurovision Song Contest 1961 for Luxembourg.

== March 19, 1961 (Sunday) ==
- Tornadoes swept through four districts of East Pakistan (now Bangladesh), killing more than 250 people. The dead included 32 people who had taken refuge in a Catholic church in Dacca after attending Sunday mass.
- Died: Ada Cornaro, 79, Argentinian tango dancer and actress

== March 20, 1961 (Monday) ==
- Phase III of testing of the Mercury spacecraft airdrop program was conducted and lasted for four weeks, until April 13. Primary objectives of the drops were to study further the spacecraft suitability and flotation capability after water impact. Six drops were made, but later (April 24–28, 1961) the tests were extended for two additional drops to monitor hard-surface landing effects.

== March 21, 1961 (Tuesday) ==
- Ion Gheorghe Maurer, formerly the ceremonial Romanian head of state as President of the Presidium of the Great National Assembly, assumed the office of head of government as Prime Minister of Romania, and would remain the premier until 1974. During Maurer's rule, he would serve the General Secretary of the Romanian Communist Party, Gheorghe Gheorghiu-Dej and later Nicolae Ceaușescu.
- The Beatles— John, Paul, George and Stu (Stuart Sutcliffe)— began the first of nearly 300 regular performances at The Cavern Club in Liverpool. Sutcliffe left the band three months later. Continuing with Ringo Starr, the group's final appearance at the Cavern Club was on August 3, 1963.
- The press agency United News of India dispatched its first reports to subscribers.

== March 22, 1961 (Wednesday) ==
- Dwight D. Eisenhower was restored to the United States Army and to his rank as a five-star General of the Army, two months after completing his term as the 34th President of the United States. General Eisenhower had resigned his commission on July 18, 1952, after accepting the Republican Party nomination for the Presidency.
- Died: Gideon Mer, 66, Israeli physician and scientist who guided the eradication of malaria in the Jewish state

== March 23, 1961 (Thursday) ==
- The Soviet Union lifted censorship restrictions for foreign news correspondents that had been in place since 1917. Except for two occasions in 1939 and 1946, non-Soviet reporters had been required to have their dispatches reviewed before transmission. Foreign office press director Mikhail Kharlamov cautioned that, although pre-approval of reports would no longer be required, foreigners were still required to keep copies of all dispatches for future review, and that persons who "circulated unfounded rumors about the Soviet Union" were still subject to expulsion.
- An American C-47 transport plane with eight men aboard disappeared over the war-torn nation of Laos after taking off from Vientiane toward Saigon. The U.S. Air Force did not announce the incident until two days later. The sole survivor, Major Lawrence R. Bailey, Jr., was captured and became the first American POW of the Vietnam Era. He would be released on August 15, 1962.
- President John F. Kennedy advised Representative Overton Brooks (D-La.) that he had no intention "to subordinate" the space activities of the National Aeronautics and Space Administration to those of the military.
- Born: George Weber, American radio personality; in Philadelphia (murdered, 2009)
- Died:
  - Valentin Bondarenko, 24, Russian cosmonaut, was burned to death in a training accident. His death would be concealed by the Soviet government for more than 25 years, finally being revealed in 1986 in an article in the daily newspaper Izvestia.
  - Heinrich Rau, 61, East German politician and Minister of Foreign Trade

== March 24, 1961 (Friday) ==
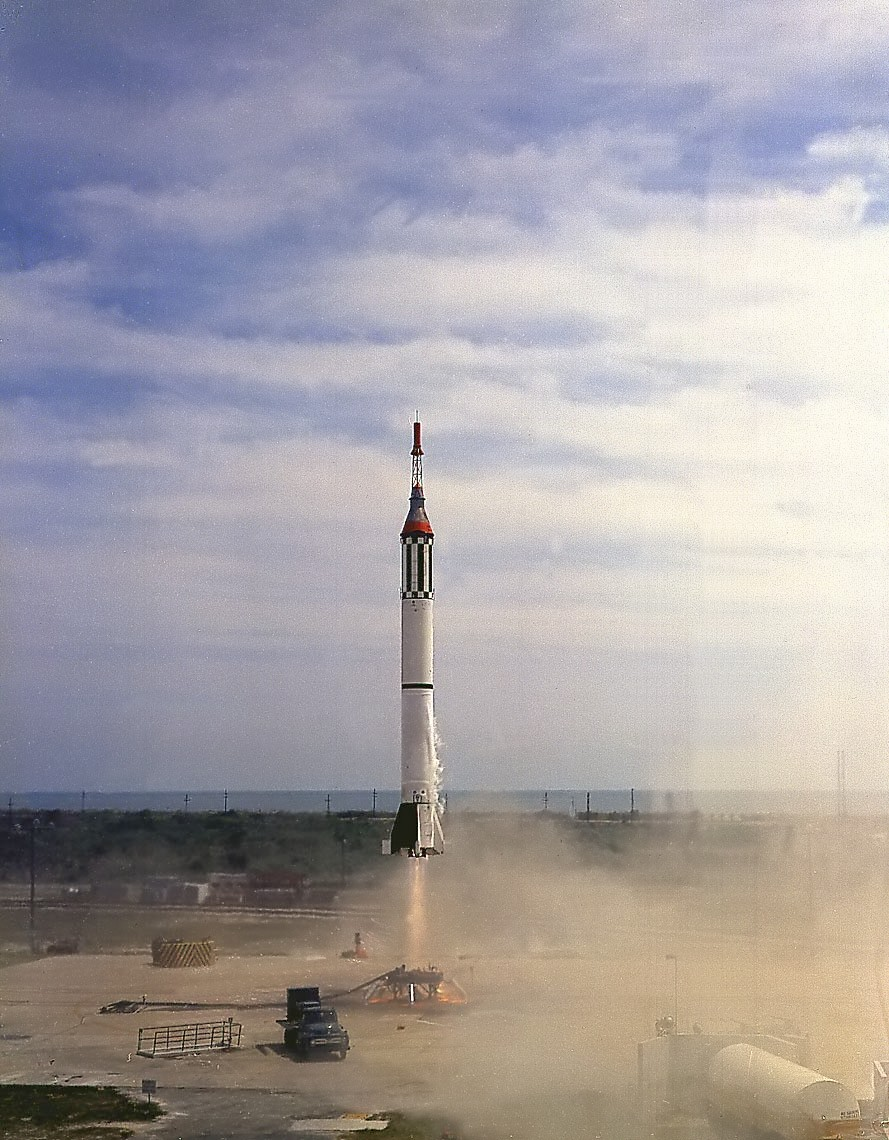
March 24, 1961: Launch of Mercury-Redstone BD

- The Mercury-Redstone BD (Mercury-Redstone Booster Development) rocket was launched from Cape Canaveral on one final test flight to certify its safety for human transport. As with earlier Soviet tests, the American space capsule carried a test dummy. The spacecraft reached an altitude of 115 miles (185 km) and was recovered in the Atlantic 8 minutes after launch. Stopped by Wernher von Braun from going, Alan Shepard had volunteered to take the flight, and would have become the first human to travel into outer space. Less than three weeks later, Soviet cosmonaut Yuri Gagarin would reach the milestone on April 12. Shepard would reach space, though not orbit, on May 5.

== March 25, 1961 (Saturday) ==
- In Kansas City, the University of Cincinnati Bearcats upset the #1 ranked Ohio State Buckeyes, 70–65, to win the NCAA basketball championship. Going into the title match, OSU had won 32 consecutive games with a team that included John Havlicek and Jerry Lucas. Future Indiana University coach Bobby Knight had kept OSU from losing in regulation by scoring the basket that tied the game, 61–61.
- The day after the U.S. launch of a test dummy into space, the Soviets made one final launch of their own Ivan Ivanovich dummy into space, along with the last dog in space, Zvezdochka. Both went up on Korabl-Sputnik 5 (called "Sputnik 10" in the West), which made one orbit and safely returned to Earth.
- Born: Reginald Fils-Aimé, American businessman best known for being the president and chief operating officer of Nintendo of America, the North American branch of the Japanese video game company Nintendo, from 2006 to 2019; in New York City

== March 26, 1961 (Sunday) ==
- In rugby union, France defeated Wales 8–6 at the Stade Colombes to assure themselves of overall victory in the 1961 Five Nations Championship.
- The Lombank Trophy was held at Snetterton Motor Racing Circuit, England, and was won by Jack Brabham in a Cooper T53.
- Born:
  - William Hague, Baron Hague of Richmond, British politician and life peer who served as Leader of the Conservative Party and Leader of the Opposition from 1997 to 2001; in Rotherham, South Yorkshire
  - Leigh Bowery, Australian performance artist; in Melbourne (d. 1994)
  - Billy Warlock, American TV soap opera actor; in Gardena, California
- Died: Carlos Duarte Costa, 72, founder of the Brazilian Catholic Apostolic Church

== March 27, 1961 (Monday) ==
- Nine African-American students from Mississippi's Tougaloo College made the first effort of passive resistance to end segregation in the state capital, Jackson, by walking into the whites-only main branch of the municipal public library. After beginning the "read-in", the students declined to leave and were arrested by police. The next day, black students at Jackson State College marched to the city jail to protest the arrest of the "Tougaloo Nine", and more demonstrations followed.
- In a NASA Headquarters note to editors of magazines and newspapers, procedures and a deadline were established for submitting the applications of accredited correspondents to cover the Mercury-Redstone 3 mission. As of April 24, 1961, the deadline date, 350 correspondents were accredited to cover the launch, the first crewed suborbital flight of Project Mercury.
- Thunderball, Ian Fleming's ninth James Bond novel, was first published, in a hardback British edition by Jonathan Cape.

== March 28, 1961 (Tuesday) ==
- U.S. President John F. Kennedy informed Congress that, as part of the proposed $43.8 billion defense budget, he was cancelling the Pye Wacket project, an experimental lenticular-form air-to-air missile, and the B-70 nuclear-powered airplane. Kennedy declared that "As a power which will never strike first, our hopes for anything close to an absolute deterrent must rest on weapons which come from hidden, moving, or invulnerable bases which will not be wiped out by a surprise attack," and lobbied instead for ten additional Polaris nuclear submarines and an increased Minuteman nuclear arsenal.
- All 52 people aboard ČSA Flight 511, a Czechoslovak State Airlines Ilyushin-18 airplane, died when it crashed near Russelbach in East Germany after an onboard explosion. The flight was on its way from Prague to Bamako, the capital of Mali, taking technicians and their families, half of them from the Soviet Union, to jobs in Africa.
- Air Afrique was founded by agreement of ten West African nations that had gained independence from France. The airline operated until 2001, when its fleet and routes were acquired by Air France.
- The Factories Act 1961 was introduced into the Parliament of the United Kingdom.
- Died:
  - Powel Crosley Jr., 74, American inventor and owner of the Cincinnati Reds baseball team
  - Chatta Singh, 74, Indian VC recipient

== March 29, 1961 (Wednesday) ==
- The Twenty-third Amendment to the United States Constitution was ratified, allowing residents of Washington, D.C., to vote in presidential elections. With at least 3/4ths of the 50 states needed to ratify the amendment New Hampshire became the 37th state to approve the measure at 1:01 p.m. Thirteen minutes later in Topeka, the Kansas House of Representatives, in a hastily called session, made that state the 38th. Arkansas was the only state to reject the proposal, which gave the District 3 electoral votes starting with the 1964 election.
- Born: Amy Sedaris, American actress, comedienne, and writer; in Endicott, New York

== March 30, 1961 (Thursday) ==
- Actor Ronald Reagan, in the course of his work as a conservative public relations man for the General Electric Company, first gave "The Speech", officially titled "Encroaching Control". In the address to the Phoenix Chamber of Commerce at the Thunderbird Room of the Hotel Westward Ho, Reagan expressed his concern that socialized medicine, federal aid to education and farm subsidies marked the gradual transition of the United States to socialism. The speech in Arizona attracted the attention of conservative Republican leaders, including U.S. Senator Barry Goldwater. As one historian would note later, "Reagan's skillful presentation of 'the Speech' brought him to the attention of the most conservative officials of the Republican Party and their supporters" who were impressed by "his admirable and unquestioned power of persuasion", and would lead to Reagan's selection to deliver the speech in a 30-minute nationwide broadcast in support of Goldwater's candidacy for U.S. president on October 27, 1964, beginning "the political journey that carried him to two terms as governor of California and, ultimately, to election and reelection as president of the United States."
- The Single Convention on Narcotic Drugs was signed at New York City. The pact would enter into force on December 13, 1964, and now applies to 149 nations.
- Redstone launch vehicle No. 7 was delivered to Cape Canaveral for the Mercury 3 mission.
- Died:
  - Ayatollah Seyyed Hossein Borujerdi, leader of Iran's Shiite Muslims, died at the age of 86. Borujerdi's death led the way to the ascension of the 58-year-old Ayatollah Ruhollah Khomeini, who in 1979 would become the leader of the Islamic Republic of Iran.
  - Former Brigadier General Mengistu Neway, 41, was hanged after the unsuccessful coup attempt against the Ethiopian government in December 1960.
  - Armand Robin, 49, French poet and journalist, died three days after his arrest following an altercation in a bar.

== March 31, 1961 (Friday) ==
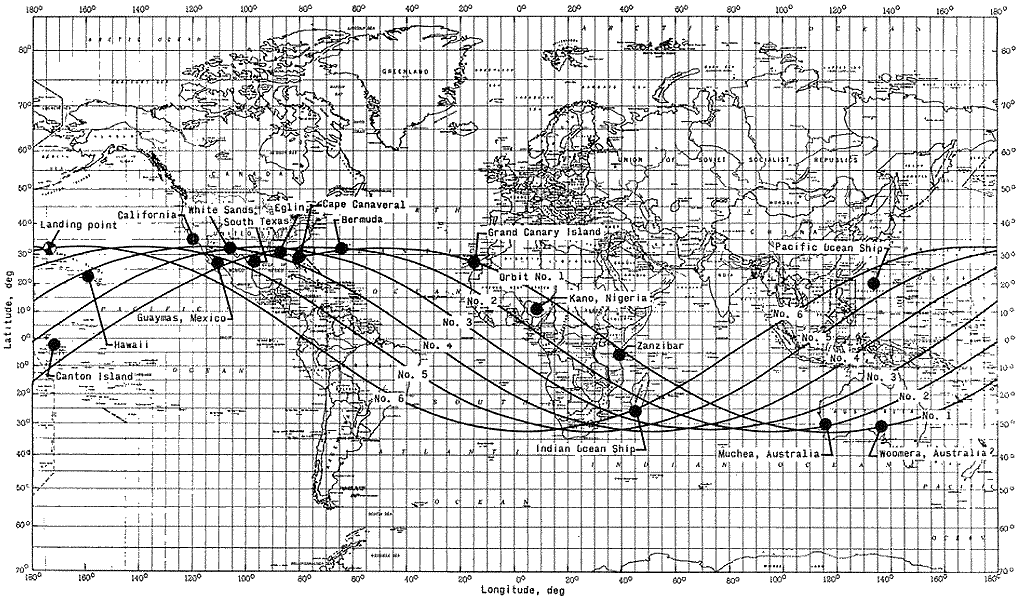
Orbital track of Mercury-Atlas 8, October 1962

- NASA's worldwide Mercury tracking network, designed by the Western Electric Company at a cost of $60,000,000 became fully operational. Western Electric would turn over the global network of 18 ground tracking stations to NASA in a formal ceremony later in the year. Electronics on two ships in the Atlantic and Indian Oceans were used to close gaps between ground stations.
- The last train ran on Ireland's Cork, Bandon and South Coast Railway.
- Died: Paul Landowski, 85, French monumental sculptor
