= Flight 511 =

Flight 511 may refer to:

- ČSA Flight 511 (March 1961), crashed on 28 March 1961
- ČSA Flight 511 (July 1961), crashed on 12 July 1961
