= ČSA Flight 511 =

ČSA Flight 511 may refer to one of the following incidents, involving aircraft of ČSA (now Czech Airlines):

- ČSA Flight 511 (March 1961), crashed in West Germany on 28 March 1961
- ČSA Flight 511 (July 1961), crashed in Morocco on 12 July 1961
