= April 1961 =

Month of 1961

<<	April 1961					>>
Su	Mo	Tu	We	Th	Fr	Sa
						1
2	3	4	5	6	7	8
9	10	11	12	13	14	15
16	17	18	19	20	21	22
23	24	25	26	27	28	29
30

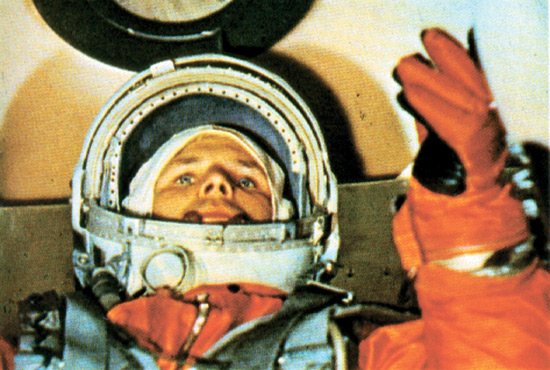
April 12, 1961: Yuri Gagarin of Soviet Union becomes first human in space

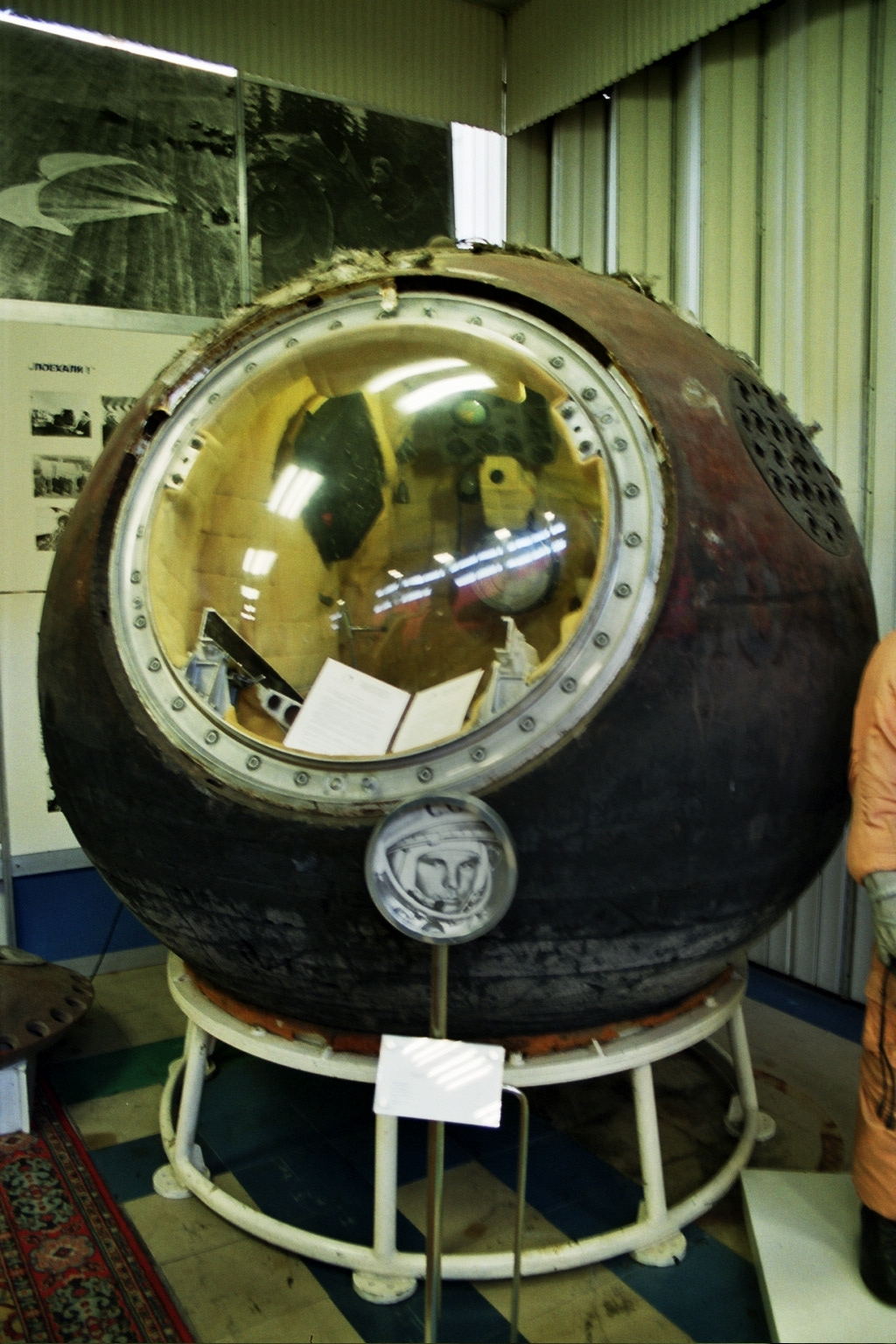
Gagarin's Vostok 1 capsule

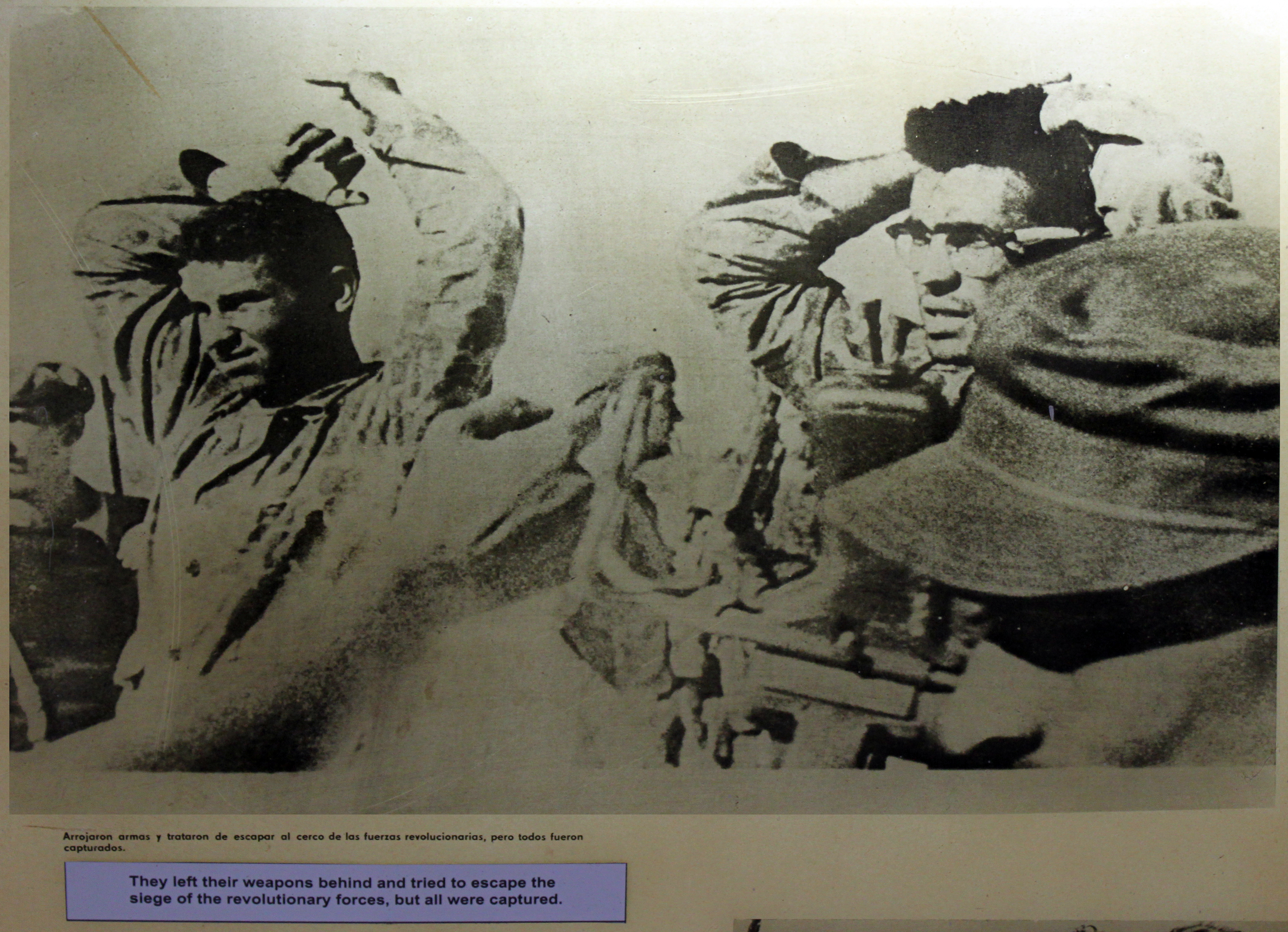
April 19, 1961: Bay of Pigs invaders captured in Cuba

April 27, 1961: Sierra Leone becomes independent

The following events occurred in April 1961:

== April 1, 1961 (Saturday) ==
- With the approval of the Food and Drug Directorate, the morning sickness suppressant thalidomide went on sale for the first time in Canada, marketed by Richardson-Merrill under the name Kevadon. The Horner Company would begin sales of its own version, Talimol, in October. Despite evidence later in the year that the drug caused birth defects, sales would not be halted in Canada until March 21, 1962, after the sale of four million tablets to expectant mothers.
- The white-minority government of South Africa opened its maximum security prison at Robben Island, 7 miles (11 km) off of the coast of Cape Town. Reporters would not be allowed to visit the facility until 16 years later, in 1977, when the prison housed 370 non-white political prisoners, including Nelson Mandela, Walter Sisulu, and Govan Mbeki, members of the African National Congress who had been imprisoned on the island since 1964.
- Jim Bakker, 21, and Tamara Faye LaValle, 19, who had met while students at North Central Bible College in Minneapolis, were married. As Jim and Tammy Faye Bakker, the two would become America's most famous televangelist couple, but would separate after scandal ended their PTL Club ministry. The couple divorced in 1992.
- Television commercials were introduced to New Zealand, which had one station (AKTV2) in Auckland, and TV was allowed for 28 hours per week, spread over five days.
- The codename "Bumpy Road" was assigned to the U.S. Navy operation in the Bay of Pigs Invasion plan.
- In Australia, Roger Nott replaced James Archer as Administrator of the Northern Territory.
- Born:
  - Susan Boyle, Scottish singer who became a worldwide sensation after singing "I Dreamed a Dream" on the TV show Britain's Got Talent; in Blackburn, West Lothian
  - Anders Forsbrand, Swedish professional golfer; in Filipstad

== April 2, 1961 (Sunday) ==
- The first simulated Project Mercury orbital mission, with the spacecraft in the altitude chamber, was conducted.
- In Tokyo, Australian swimmer Jan Andrew broke the world record for the Women's 100 m butterfly.
- Born:
  - Emmanuel Issoze-Ngondet, 10th prime minister of Gabon from 2016 to 2019 and former Minister for Foreign Affairs (d. 2020); in Makokou
  - Christopher Meloni, American TV actor; in Washington, D.C.

== April 3, 1961 (Monday) ==
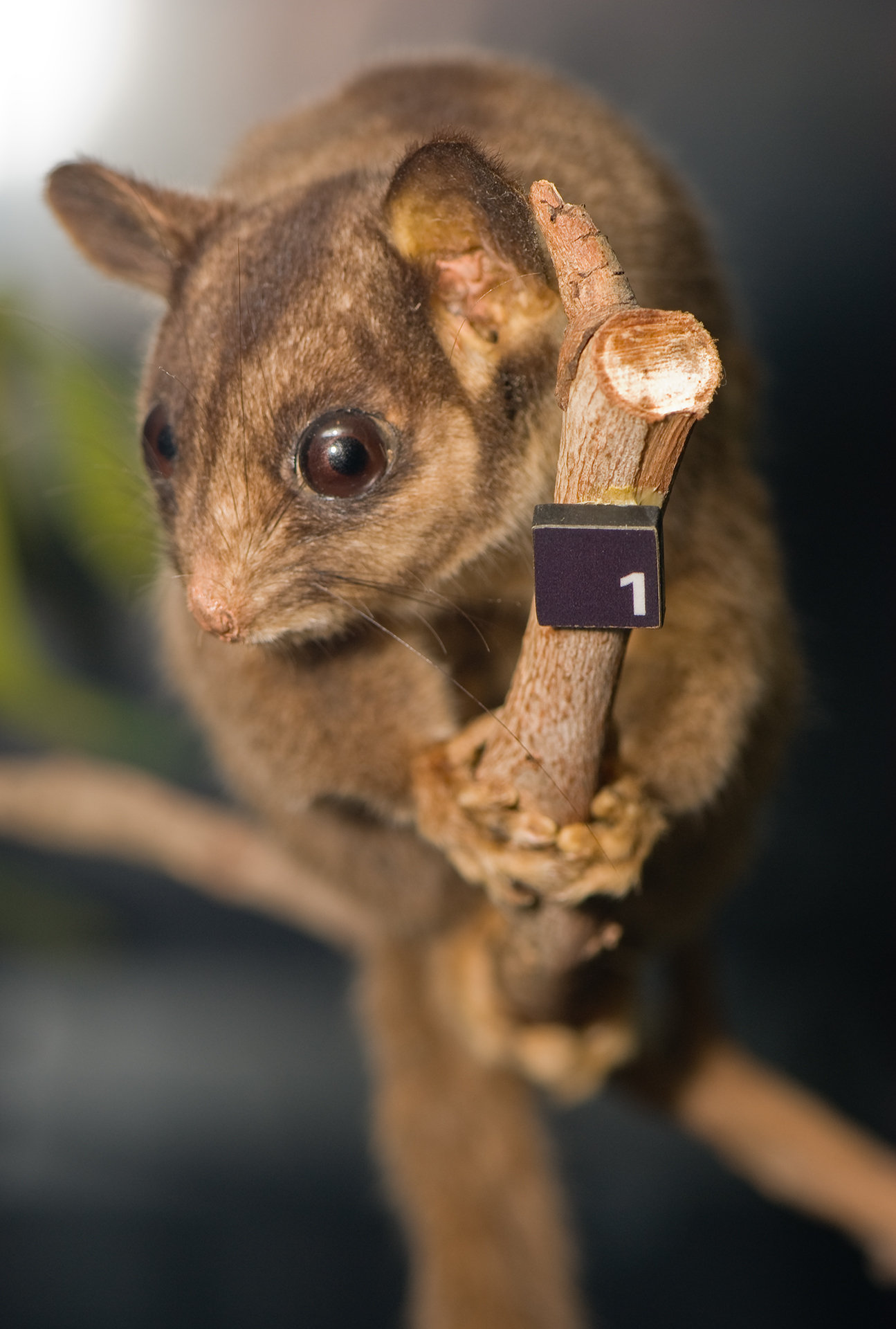
Rediscovered possum

- Believed to have become extinct in 1909, the Leadbeater's possum (Gymnobelideus leadbeateri) was rediscovered in Australia by naturalist Eric Wilkinson. Later in the month, the first specimen found in more than 50 years was captured.
- The Twenty-third Amendment to the United States Constitution, granting citizens in the District of Columbia the right to vote in national elections, officially took effect upon certification by John L. Moore, U.S. Administrator of General Services. The amendment had been ratified by 38 states as of March 29.
- Country music star Spade Cooley, nicknamed "The King of Western Swing", murdered his wife Ella Mae after she admitted to having an affair. Cooley would remain in prison until 1969 and died on November 23 of that year after performing a concert while on furlough.
- The National Educational Radio Network, funded with a grant from the Ford Foundation, began broadcasting on six radio stations. The network would give way to government funded National Public Radio on March 3, 1970.
- The Soviet government approved sending a man into space on an April 12 rocket launch and made a choice between the two remaining candidates for first cosmonaut, Yuri Gagarin and Gherman Titov.
- To satisfy the national interest in Project Mercury, Robert R. Gilruth designated the Public Affairs Office as the point of contact for Space Task Group activities to supply information, within the limits of security, for news dissemination.
- John Surtees won the 9th Glover Trophy at Goodwood in a Cooper T53.
- Born:
  - Eddie Murphy, American comedian and film actor known for Beverly Hills Cop and its sequels; in Brooklyn
  - Elizabeth Gracen, American actress who won the title of Miss America in 1982; in Ozark, Arkansas
  - Angelo d'Arrigo, Italian aviator; in Catania (killed in plane crash, 2006)
- Died: Florence Cole Talbert, 70, African-American operatic soprano

== April 4, 1961 (Tuesday) ==
- Carlos Marcello, boss of the Mafia in New Orleans, was arrested after making a required check-in with the local office of the Immigration and Naturalization Service, driven to the airport and placed as the only passenger on an airplane bound for Guatemala City. Marcello's deportation, ordered by U.S. Attorney General Robert F. Kennedy, was done immediately, without affording him the benefit of a phone call, money or even a change of clothes. Marcello, outraged by the surprise move, would sneak back into the United States two months later. Some conspiracy theorists suggest that Marcello conspired in the 1963 assassination of President Kennedy in revenge for the act.
- Final plans for a U.S.-supported invasion of Cuba at the Bahía de los Cochinos ("Bay of Pigs") were presented starting at 6:00 p.m. in a conference room at the office of U.S. Secretary of State Dean Rusk, convened by President John F. Kennedy. U.S. Senator William Fulbright of Arkansas, who argued against the operation, was invited to participate at the meeting, which also included Defense Secretary Robert McNamara, CIA Director Allen Dulles, and three members of the Joint Chiefs of Staff. The meeting ended at 8:18 p.m. with Kennedy approving the mission.
- Mercury spacecraft No. 14A was delivered to Wallops Island for the Little Joe 5B maximum dynamic-pressure abort mission. This spacecraft was first used in the Little Joe 5A mission and was then refitted for the LJ-5B flight. John Glenn, Virgil Grissom, and Alan Shepard began a refresher course on the Aviation Medical Acceleration Laboratory human centrifuge in preparation for the first crewed Mercury-Redstone suborbital flight.
- Born: Tom Byron, American pornographic film star; in Orange, Texas
- Died: Simion Stoilow, 73, Romanian mathematician

== April 5, 1961 (Wednesday) ==
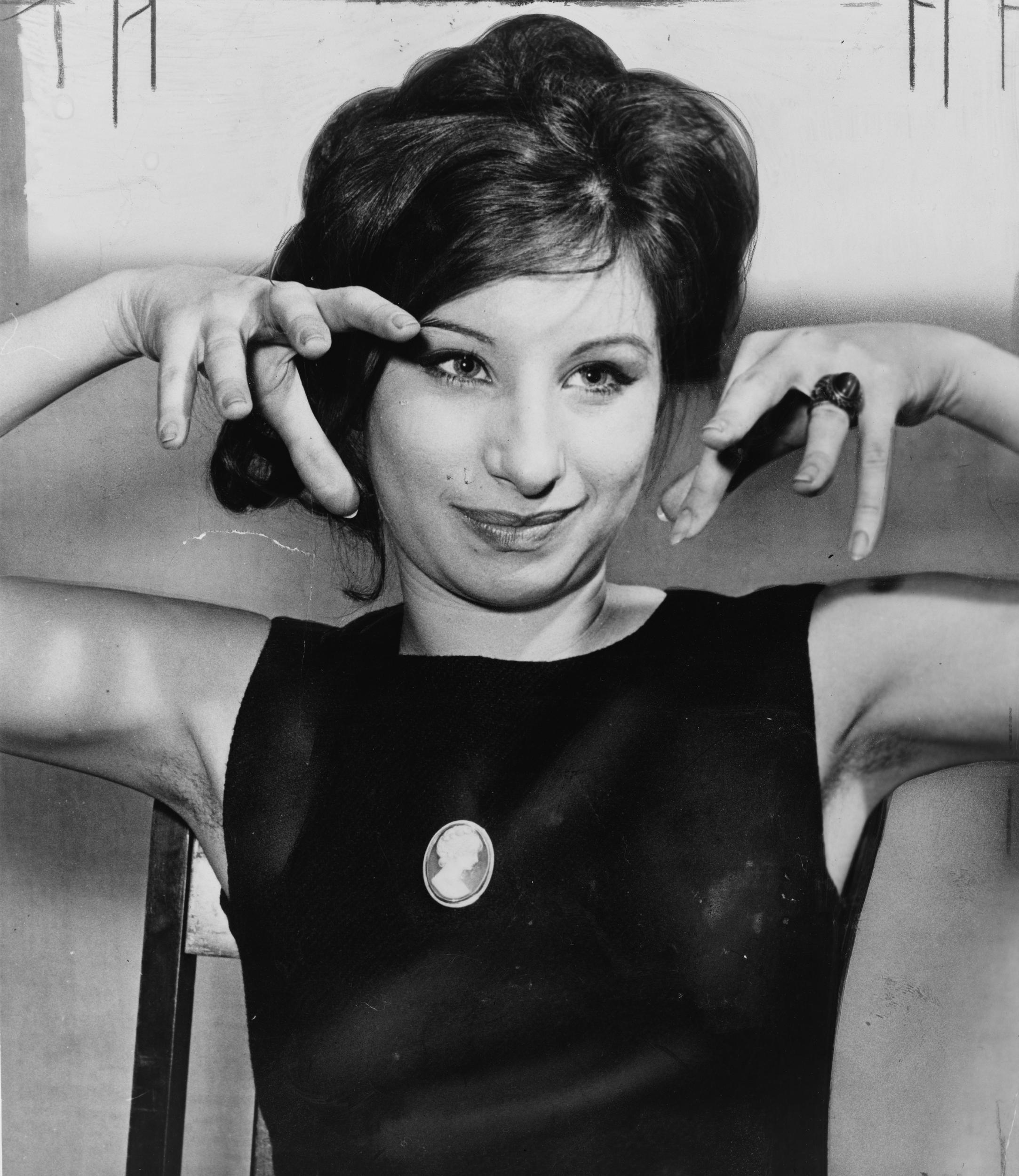
"Barbara Strysand"

- Singer Barbra Streisand made her national television debut, as a guest on Tonight Starring Jack Paar. In TV listings, both of her names were misspelled, as "Barbara Strysand".
- The New Guinea Council of Western Papua took office with 28 members, 23 of whom were indigenous residents.

== April 6, 1961 (Thursday) ==
- New York Governor Nelson Rockefeller signed the bill authorizing the construction of the World Trade Center and a rehabilitation of the Hudson & Manhattan Railroad (H&M RR). The original plan for the WTC called for construction of several buildings in the east side of Manhattan, near the Brooklyn Bridge, the two tallest being 72 stories and 30 stories. New Jersey, which shared the Port Authority with New York, protested the location and the site was relocated to Manhattan's west side, where the H&M's office buildings stood.
- New York Times reporter Tad Szulc filed a two column story reporting that an invasion of Cuba was "imminent". Times publisher Orvil Dryfoos chose not to run the news after consulting with the paper's Washington bureau. Dryfoos's decision would be revealed five years later, in 1966, by editor Clifton Daniel in a speech at Macalester College.
- American author Fritz Leiber suggested the term "sword and sorcery" as "a good popular catchphrase for the field" of fantasy fiction.
- Graduated pensions were introduced in the UK at the beginning of the tax year.
- Joseph C. Satterthwaite became the U.S. ambassador to South Africa.
- Died: Jules Bordet, 90, Belgian microbiologist

== April 7, 1961 (Friday) ==
- In Montevideo, Uruguay, the Treaty between the Argentine Republic and the Eastern Republic of Uruguay concerning the boundary constituted by the River Uruguay was signed by the leaders of Argentina and Uruguay. Effective January 19, 1966, the channels of navigation and the islands within the river would be divided along the river on a line running from the southwest headland of the Isla Brasilera to the point where the Uruguay River merged with the Paraná River to form the Río de la Plata.
- Vladimir Ilyushin, according to contemporary rumours, supposedly became the first man in space. Dennis Ogden, at the time an American reporter for the U.S. Communist Party newspaper, the Daily Worker, would later note that Soviet papers reported that cosmonaut Ilyushin had been seriously injured in a car accident, and speculated that the news was a cover for a mission that had gone wrong.
- Born:
  - DONDI (nom de plume for Donald Joseph White) American graffiti artist (d. 1998); in Brooklyn
  - Luigi De Agostini, Italian footballer; in Udine
- Died:
  - Marian Jordan, 62, radio comedian who, with her husband, starred in the title roles of Fibber McGee and Molly
  - H. Rowan Gaither, 59, American businessman who authored the controversial Gaither Report in 1957
  - Vanessa Bell, 81, English artist

== April 8, 1961 (Saturday) ==
- The explosion of the passenger ship MV Dara and subsequent fire and panic killed 238 passengers and crew, while another 565 were rescued. Shortly after 4:00 a.m., the British India Steam Navigation Company passenger ship was rocked by a blast that would later be blamed by British Admiralty court on an anti-tank mine, "deliberately placed by a person or persons unknown". After the evacuation, the ship sank on April 10 while it was being towed.
- The leadership of the Malta Labour Party, readers, advertisers and distributors of Party papers as well as its voters were placed under an interdict, which lasted until 1969.
- Born: Richard Hatch, American reality show contestant who won the first competition in the TV series Survivor; in Middletown, Rhode Island
- Died: Princess Kapiolani Kawananakoa Field, 58, pretender to the throne of Hawaii. Mrs. Field "would have been Queen of Hawaii had the monarchy continued," an obituary noted, but she "would not listen to talk of reinstating the monarchy." She was quoted as saying "If America wanted to do something on her own accord to restore the monarchy, that would be all right. But no Hawaiian would do anything to hurt America. We love America too much." Her son, Edward A. Kawananakoa, identified by monarchists as the new pretender, Kawananakoa II, would live until 1997.

== April 9, 1961 (Sunday) ==
- Eight days before the scheduled invasion of Cuba, the CIA learned that the Soviet Union was aware that the attack would take place on April 17. Even with the secret compromised, the CIA elected not to call off the operation nor to alert the participants. The information would not be made public until 39 years later, with the declassification of the Taylor Commission report.
- The last of the streetcars of Los Angeles was retired, after 136 passengers boarded the final scheduled Pacific Electric Railway red car to ride the 18-mile (29 km) rail line to Long Beach. A charter car departed 10 minutes later. The network had been formed in 1902, but the interurban tracks were gradually removed after World War II.
- Albert Kalonji, President of the South Kasai breakaway republic, was crowned the Mulopwe, a Baluba language word for monarch, of his people.
- Joseph Ganda was ordained as the first native Roman Catholic priest in Sierra Leone.

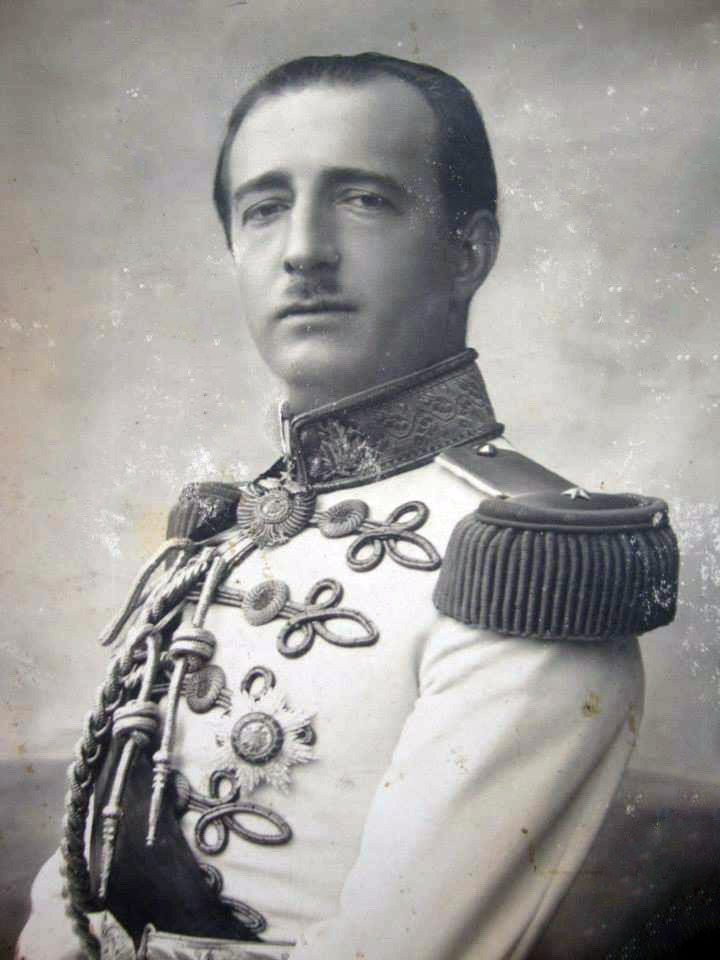
King Zog of Albania

- Died: Zog I, 65, former King of Albania from 1928 to 1939, died from an undisclosed condition. As Ahmet Zogu, he had been prime minister and then President of Albania before proclaiming a monarchy. Albanian exiles proclaimed his 22-year-old son, the former crown prince, as King Leka I.

== April 10, 1961 (Monday) ==
- President Kennedy "threw what was regarded as the longest and hardest first ball ever tossed by a President" to open the 1961 Major League Baseball season. The new Washington Senators became the first expansion team to play in the majors, and lost to the Chicago White Sox, 4–3. The next day, the Los Angeles Angels became the second team, beating the Baltimore Orioles 7–2, while the old Senators, playing as the Minnesota Twins, beat the New York Yankees 6–0.
- A radar signal, transmitted from the Jet Propulsion Laboratory to Venus, gave the first definite measurement of its distance from Earth (26,372,600 miles (42,442,600 km)). "This single determination", it has been written, "was sufficient to fix the scale of the solar system with an unprecedented accuracy."
- William P. Sidney of the United Kingdom, an executive of the Schwepps beverage company, and who was officially known as the Viscount De L'Isle, became the 15th Governor-General of Australia, filling the vacancy left by the death of Viscount Dunrossil in February.
- Gary Player of South Africa became the first foreigner to win the American Masters Tournament, taking the event by one stroke. On the very last hole, the leader, Arnold Palmer, had to take six strokes.

== April 11, 1961 (Tuesday) ==
- The trial of Nazi Adolf Eichmann began in Jerusalem. Eichmann, accused of more than six million murders, was found guilty on August 14, and hanged on May 31, 1962.

== April 12, 1961 (Wednesday) ==
- At 2:07 p.m. local time (9:07 a.m. Moscow, 0607 UTC and 1:07 a.m. in New York), Soviet cosmonaut Yuri Gagarin was launched from Baikonur, in the Kazakh SSR, on the Vostok 1 (East 1) rocket and became the first human being to go into outer space. Gagarin made one orbit of the Earth before re-entering, and landed at 10:55 a.m., 15 miles (24 km) southwest of the city of Engels in Russia's Saratov Oblast.

== April 13, 1961 (Thursday) ==
- In Portugal, an attempted coup d'etat against the government of António de Oliveira Salazar failed, after being carried out by General Júlio Botelho Moniz .
- Died: Former Private First Class John A. Bennett, 25, became the last American serviceman to be executed following a court-martial. Bennett had been convicted of the 1954 rape and attempted murder of an 11-year-old girl while in Austria and was hanged at the prison at Fort Leavenworth.

== April 14, 1961 (Friday) ==
- "MH-5", the Materials Handling Committee #5 of the American Standards Association, approved the standard size for shipping containers now used worldwide, with dimensions of 8 feet (2.4 m) high, 8 feet (2.4 m) wide, and in units of 10 feet (3.0 m), 20 feet (6.1 m), 30 feet (9.1 m) and 40 feet (12 m) long.
- In an event televised live throughout the Soviet Union and Eastern Europe, Yuri Gagarin received a hero's welcome at the Vnukovo airport, where he was greeted by Soviet dignitaries, and along the 10-mile (16 km) route from the airport to Moscow's Red Square.
- NASA issued study contract NAS 9–119 to McDonnell for improvement of the Mercury spacecraft as an operational vehicle. Among the changes was relocating some equipment location from inside the Mercury pressure vessel to the outside.
- Brigade 2506, the group of 1,400 Cuban exiles, boarded ships and departed from Puerto Cabezas, Nicaragua for a three-day voyage to Cuba where it would invade at the Bay of Pigs.
- Hungary abolished its "People's Courts", which had pronounced sentences on 22,000 people, including 280 death sentences, for their role in the Hungarian Revolution of 1956.
- Born: Robert Carlyle, Scottish film and TV actor; in Maryhill, Glasgow

== April 15, 1961 (Saturday) ==
- The preliminary stage of the Bay of Pigs Invasion commenced as eight Douglas B-26B Invader bombers attacked Cuban airfields at San Antonio de Los Baños, Ciudad Libertad, and Santiago de Cuba airport. The B-26s had been prepared by the CIA on behalf of Brigade 2506, and painted in false flag markings of the Cuban air force. They had flown from Nicaragua with crews of Cuban exiles, and the purpose of Operation Puma was to destroy armed aircraft of the Cuban air force in advance of the main invasion. Shortly after the attacks, another B-26 flew to Miami with false battle damage, and the pilot falsely claimed to be one of several Cuban defectors. At the United Nations, the Cuban Foreign Minister accused the U.S. of aggressive air attacks against Cuba. The U.S. ambassador to the UN Adlai Stevenson stated that U.S. armed forces would not "under any conditions" intervene in Cuba. He was later embarrassed to realize that the CIA had lied to him and to Secretary of State Dean Rusk.
- Born: Tiina Lillak, Finnish javelin thrower and 1983 world champion; in Helsinki

== April 16, 1961 (Sunday) ==
- In a funeral oration in Vedado for victims of the air raids from the previous day's invasion, Fidel Castro described the January 1959 Cuban Revolution as follows: "...esta es la Revolución socialista y democrática de los humildes, con los humildes y para los humildes..." ("...this is the socialist and democratic revolution of the working people, with the working people, and for the working people...").
- The Vienna Grand Prix was won by Stirling Moss in a Lotus 18.

== April 17, 1961 (Monday) ==
- Thousands of troops began the Bay of Pigs Invasion of Cuba at 1:00 in the morning local time, as Operation Zapata got under way. The first group of a force of about 1,300 Cuban exiles of Brigade 2506 made an amphibious landing at Playa Girón, a beach at the Bahia de Cochinos ("Bay of Pigs" in Spanish) on the southern coast of Cuba. They had been trained by the CIA in Guatemala, then embarked in Nicaragua on four freighter ships chartered by the CIA and escorted to Cuban waters by a large U.S. Navy task force. A second group of attackers landed 35 kilometres (22 mi) further northwest in the bay at Playa Larga. By about 06:30, the freighter ships and landing craft still unloading troops, vehicles and equipment were attacked by Sea Fury fighter-bombers and T-33 jets of the Cuban air force. At about 07:30, 177 invading paratroops were dropped at four locations north of the landing areas. By about 09:00, one of the freighters had been damaged and beached, and another was then sunk in the bay by air-to-ground rockets. The surviving vessels withdrew south to international waters. By the end of the day, four attacking B-26 bombers had been shot down by T-33s and ground fire, and invading troops had come under fire from Cuban militia and regular troops.
- The 33rd Academy Awards ceremony was hosted by Bob Hope. The award for Best Picture went to The Apartment, for which Billy Wilder won Best Director. Burt Lancaster won Best Actor (for Elmer Gantry), Elizabeth Taylor Best Actress (for BUtterfield 8).
- Born: Greg Gianforte, Governor of Montana since 2021; in San Diego, California

== April 18, 1961 (Tuesday) ==
- Cuban ground forces continued their advances against invading troops, retaking Playa Larga, and advancing towards Playa Girón and the paratroop positions. They were attacked by B-26s flown by Cuban exiles and CIA contractors using napalm, machine guns and bombs.
- The Vienna Convention on Diplomatic Relations was approved, 72–0, by participants at a six-week-long conference convened by the United Nations and entered into effect on April 24, 1964.
- Catherine Dorris Norrell, widow and legislative assistant of Arkansas Congressman William F. Norrell, won a special election to fill the vacancy left by her husband's death on February 15, defeating four men vying for the office. She took office as U.S. representative for the 6th District of Arkansas on April 25, and finished out his term.

== April 19, 1961 (Wednesday) ==
- Air attacks were made by B-26s against advancing Cuban ground forces. Combat air patrols, with strict rules of engagement, were flown by unmarked U.S. Navy A4D Skyhawk jets from USS Essex, but they failed to prevent two bombers being shot down by Cuban aircraft, killing four Americans of the Alabama National Guard employed by the CIA as aircrew trainers. By dusk, about 17:30, Brigade 2506 ground forces had retreated to the beaches, then surrendered or dispersed into neighbouring swamps. About 114 Brigade ground troops, and 176 Cuban ground forces, were killed in combat. With the failure of the Bay of Pigs Invasion, Cuba would take 1,189 of the invaders as prisoners of war and try them for treason. On December 24, 1962, the last group of 1,113 prisoners would be released in exchange for $53,000,000 worth of food and medicine.
- Born: Anna Gerasimova, Russian singer and songwriter; in Moscow

== April 20, 1961 (Thursday) ==
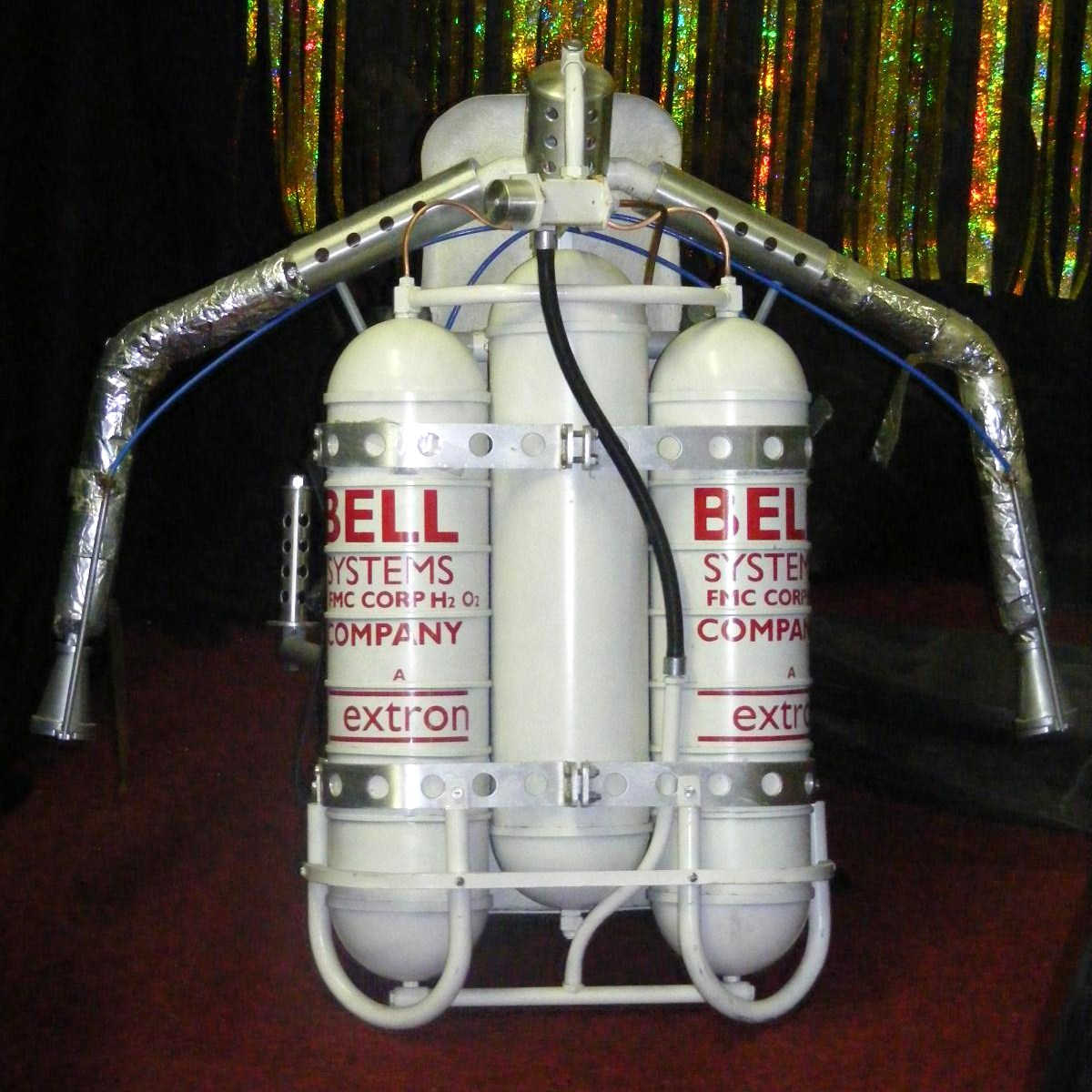
The Bell Rocket Belt

- Harold Graham, a 26-year-old test pilot for Bell Laboratories, made the first successful untethered test of the Bell Rocket Belt, a jet pack. Starting at the airport in Niagara Falls, New York, Graham flew 112 feet (34 m) with the 21-second supply of superheated steam.
- U.S. President John F. Kennedy sent Vice-president Johnson, to whom he had delegated the job of Chairman of the National Aeronautics and Space Council, a memorandum asking him to find out, "Do we have a chance of beating the Soviets in the race to be the first to go the moon and back with a man?"
- Born: Don Mattingly, American baseball player and manager who was the American League batting champion (1984) and RBI leader (1985) and later the National League Manager of the Year (2020) for the Miami Marlins; in Evansville, Indiana

== April 21, 1961 (Friday) ==
- At a press conference in the State Department, President Kennedy was asked by NBC reporter Sander Vanocur whether it was true that Dean Rusk and Chester Bowles had opposed the failed Bay of Pigs Invasion. Kennedy replied "There's an old saying that victory has a hundred fathers and defeat is an orphan... What matters is only one fact, I am the responsible officer of the government." The saying was later attributed to Mussolini's Foreign Minister, Galeazzo Ciano, in 1942.
- The Minnesota Twins, who had already played six road games, made their debut at home for the first regular season Major League Baseball game in Minnesota. Formerly the Washington Senators until moving, the team played the new Washington Senators (who would later become the Texas Rangers), and lost, 5–3.
- Died:
  - William Wright Harts, 94, United States Army general and adviser to U.S. president Wilson at the Paris Peace Conference after World War I
  - Princess Isabelle d'Orléans, 82, member of the French Orleanist royal family and by marriage Duchess of Guise
  - James Melton, 57, American popular and operatic tenor singer, died from lobar pneumonia

== April 22, 1961 (Saturday) ==
- Four retired French Generals — Maurice Challe and Raoul Salan, both of whom had formerly been Commanders-in-Chief of the French Army in Algeria; Edmond Jouhaud, former Inspector General of the French Air Force; and André Zeller, former Chief of Staff of the French Ground Army attempted a coup and sent at least 2,000 paratroopers to seize control of cities in Algeria to prevent the transfer of power from France to Algerian nationals. In the early morning hours in Algiers, France's delegate general, Jean Morin, French Transport Minister Robert Buron, and General Fernand Gambiez were taken prisoner as the troops seized control of government offices. Expecting that an attempted coup would reach the French mainland, President Charles De Gaulle ordered loyal units to fight the mutineers. Failing to win support in the coup, General Challe surrendered to loyal troops on April 26 and was flown to Paris to face trial for treason, while Salan, Jouhad and Zeller fled, along with former prime minister Georges Bidault, who had joined the generals in a statement calling for the overthrow of De Gaulle.
- Deputy Sheriffs Alex Gary Morris Sr., and Alonzo Brownlow Tyler of the Hancock County, Tennessee Sheriff's Department were shot and killed while trying to arrest another county law enforcement officer, constable C. B. Oakes, for drunk driving. After Morris and Tyler pursued constable Oakes to his home, seven members of his family shot and killed the deputies; the constable was also killed.

== April 23, 1961 (Sunday) ==
- Judy Garland performed a legendary comeback concert at Carnegie Hall in New York City, receiving a standing ovation as she arrived on stage, and five minutes of cheering. Variety critic Gordon Cox described the event as "the greatest night in show business history". The live performance was recorded as a Grammy award-winning and bestselling album, Judy at Carnegie Hall.
- For the first and only time in the history of the Fifth Republic of France, the emergency powers (pouvoirs exceptionnels) provision in Article 16 of its Constitution was invoked. President De Gaulle would retain the special power for five months following the uprising in Algeria, until September 29.
- A monument "to the victims of fascism" was dedicated before a crowd of 200,000 by East German leader Walter Ulbricht at the site of the Sachsenhausen concentration camp.
- Born: George Lopez, American stand-up comedian and actor; in Los Angeles
- Died: Clete Turner, 52, Australian rules footballer

== April 24, 1961 (Monday) ==
- The Swedish warship Vasa was raised from the sea after sinking in the Baltic Sea almost 333 years earlier. The Vasa capsized hours into its maiden voyage on August 10, 1628, drowning the 30 people on board. The ship had been rediscovered in 1956 by Anders Franzén off the island of Beckholmen, still well-preserved, and is now in a museum in Stockholm.
- Major General Don R. Ostrander, NASA Director of Launch Vehicle Programs, testified before the House Committee on Science and Astronautics about plans for work on orbital rendezvous techniques, an issue which figured prominently in hearings on NASA's proposed 1962 budget.
- "Stand by Me", a song performed by Ben E. King, was released by Atco Records. The song became an instant hit in 1961 and would regain popularity after being featured on the soundtrack of the 1986 film of the same name. Since then, there have been over 400 recorded versions of the song and has been listed as one of the best love songs in music history.

== April 25, 1961 (Tuesday) ==
- U.S. Patent 2,981,877 was issued to Robert Noyce, founder of the Intel Corporation as the first ever granted for an integrated circuit. Noyce's application for "Semiconductor Device-and-Lead Structure" had been filed on July 30, 1959, after Jack Kilby's filing on May 6, 1959, for "Miniaturized Self-Contained Circuit Modules and Method of Fabrication", but was not approved until June 23, 1964 (and granted U.S. Patent 3,138,744) because it was more complex.

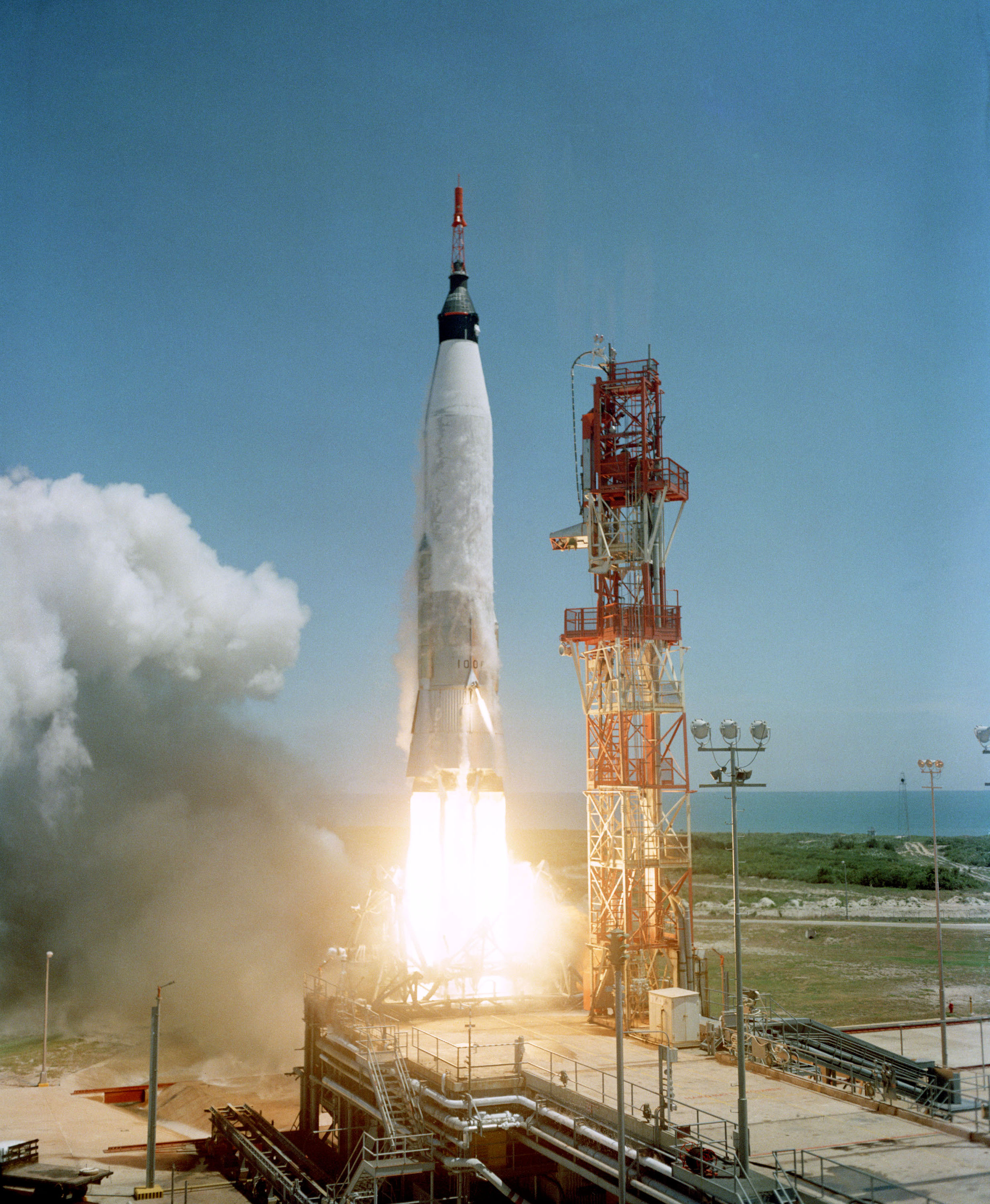
April 25, 1961: Launch of Mercury 3

- The uncrewed Mercury 3 (MA-3) was launched from Cape Canaveral in an attempt to orbit the spacecraft with a "mechanical astronaut" aboard. After lift-off, the launch vehicle failed to roll to a 70-degree heading and to pitch over into the proper trajectory. The abort-sensing system activated the escape rockets prior, and the rocket was destroyed by the range safety officer 40 seconds, reaching an altitude of 16,400 feet (5,000 m). The destruction of the Atlas rocket sent a rain of shrapnel downward. The spacecraft then coasted up to 24,000 feet (7,300 m), deployed its parachutes, and landed in the Atlantic Ocean 2,000 yards (1,800 m) north of the launch pad. The spacecraft was recovered and was found to have incurred only superficial damage; it was then shipped to McDonnell for refitting. Astronaut Gus Grissom, piloting an F-106A to observe the launch, was able to fly through the debris without injury. An Atlas investigation board was convened on May 17 to study the cause of failure of the launch of the uncrewed Mercury-Atlas 3 rocket.

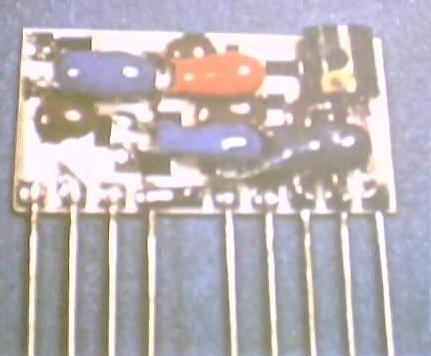
Early integrated circuit

- In order to prevent an atomic bomb from falling under the control of mutineering French officers in Algeria, France hastily detonated the last of its plutonium fission devices at Reggane in the Sahara Desert.
- U.S. president Kennedy signed legislation making the vice president of the United States (Lyndon Johnson) the presiding officer of the National Aeronautics and Space Council.

== April 26, 1961 (Wednesday) ==
- The rebellion of the French Army in Algiers was suppressed with the surrender of most mutineering soldiers, along with Generals Maurice Challe and André Zeller. The other two ringleaders, General Raoul Salan and General Edmond Jouhaud, would remain at large and would found the Organisation armée secrète (Secret Army Organization) as a terrorist group dedicated to keep European settlers in control of Algeria.
- Born: Joan Chen (stage name for Chen Chong), Chinese and American actress; in Shanghai

== April 27, 1961 (Thursday) ==
- At 10 seconds after midnight in Freetown, the green, white and blue flag of the Dominion of Sierra Leone replaced Britain's Union Jack as the former British colony for freed slaves became an independent nation. A British anti-slavery society had purchased West African land in 1787 from King Waimbana, and Britain created the colony in 1808. Later in the day, Sir Milton Margai took office as the nation's first prime minister, and accepted the new constitution from Prince Edward, Duke of Kent, who was appearing on behalf of his cousin, Queen Elizabeth II. The former colonial governor, Sir Maurice Henry Dorman, became the first Governor-General. Opposition leader Siaka Stevens, who would become president when the Dominion became a Republic in 1971, was kept under house arrest until ceremonies were over.
- U.S. president Kennedy delivered a speech to the American Newspaper Publishers Association. The President told the assembled press that the Cold War required the media to avoid disclosing information that might threaten American interests, saying, "Every newspaper now asks itself with respect to every story: 'Is it news?'. All I ask is that you add the question: 'Is it in the interest of national security?'"

== April 28, 1961 (Friday) ==
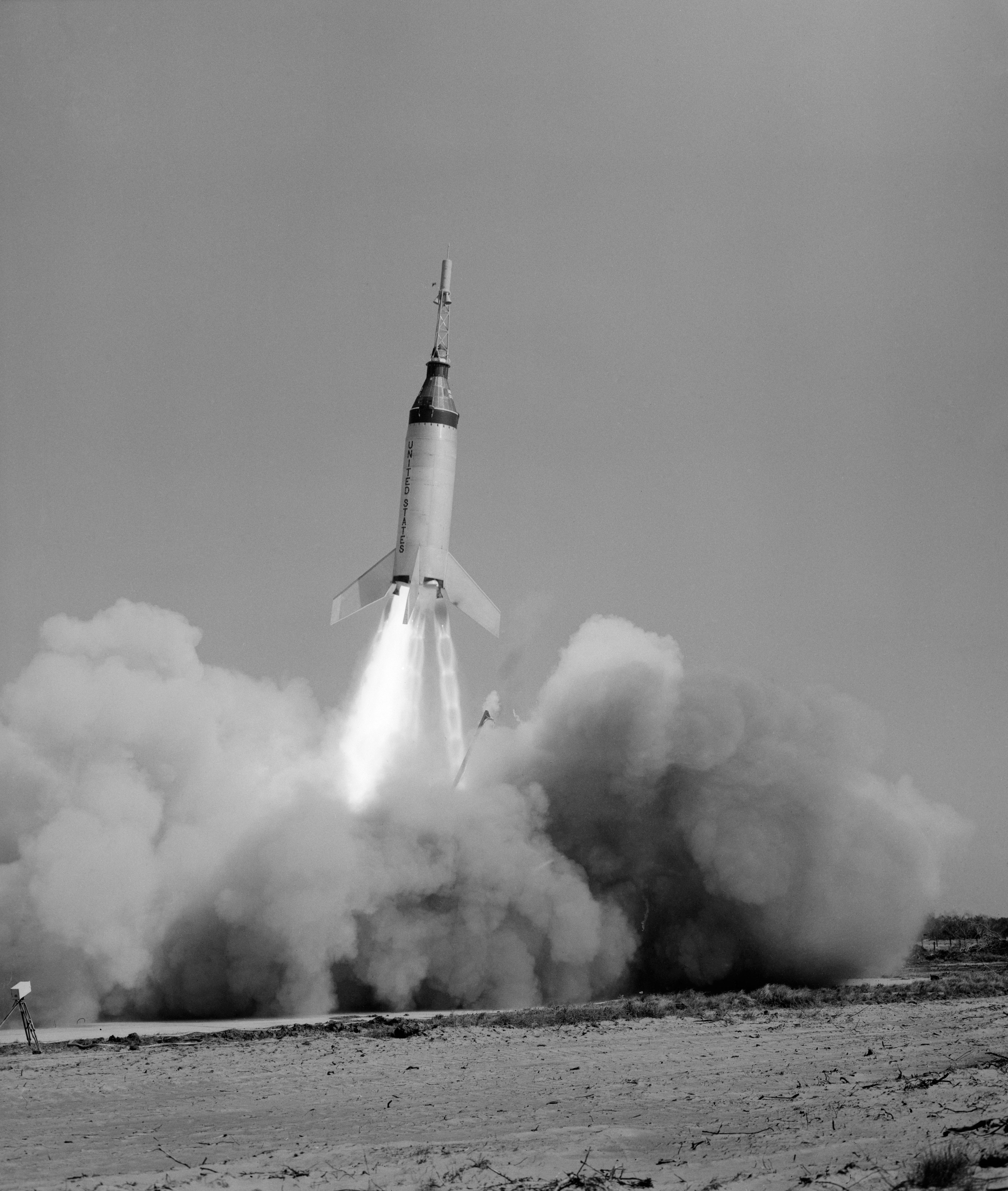
April 28, 1961: Launch of Little Joe 5B

- Little Joe 5B, the final uncrewed test of the Launch Escape System of the Mercury spacecraft, was launched from Wallops Island, Virginia, exactly one week before the first American astronaut would be launched from Cape Canaveral. A misfire sent the rocket to an altitude of only 14,000 feet (4,300 m), far short of the 40,000-foot (12,000 m) altitude at which the abort system was set to eject the capsule. Despite the setback, the system performed flawlessly, even against a dynamic air pressure of almost twice as much as what had been planned.
- A simulated countdown for the first Mercury-Redstone crewed suborbital flight (MR-3) was successfully completed.

== April 29, 1961 (Saturday) ==
UAS Flag

- The Union of African States was created as the nation of Mali joined an existing union between Ghana and Guinea to become the third member of what Ghana's leader Kwame Nkrumah had described as the nucleus of a "United States of Africa" open to all nations on the continent. The Union fell apart after Nkrumah's ouster in 1966.
- The television program ABC's Wide World of Sports, hosted by Jim McKay, made its debut at 2:00 p.m. EST. The innovative program used videotaped highlights of sports not often seen on TV, and started with two track and field competitions, the Penn Relays and the Drake Relays.
- Westward Television became the exclusive holder of the independent television franchise for the South West of England, and would retain it for twenty years.
- Luciano Pavarotti, a 25-year-old tenor from Italy, made his operatic debut, as Rodolfo in a production of La bohème at Reggio Emilia.
- Died: Cisco Houston, 42, American folk singer, died from stomach cancer.

== April 30, 1961 (Sunday) ==
- Willie Mays of the San Francisco Giants ended a batting slump with what he described as "the greatest game of my career", becoming only the sixth major league player to hit four home runs in one game, in a 14–4 win over the host Milwaukee Braves, whose Hank Aaron hit two homers. Giants' first-base coach Wes Westrum, a former catcher, is said to have been able to decode the signals from the Braves' catcher, and to have signaled Mays on what to expect.
- Eastern Air Lines revolutionized commuter air travel by inaugurating the Eastern Air-Shuttle, hourly flights between New York's LaGuardia Airport and Boston and Washington, with no reservation required. If a customer was unable to make one flight, it was guaranteed that another one would be available within an hour or less. The New York Times described it as "the greatest advance in aviation since the Wright Brothers".
- The first nuclear-powered Soviet submarine, K-19, was commissioned.
- Lee Harvey Oswald married Marina Prusakova in Minsk, Belarus.
- Born: Isiah Thomas, American NBA basketball player honored by the league in 1996 as one of the 50 greatest in the first 50 years of NBA history; in Chicago
- Died: Dickie Dale, 34, British motorcycle racer, was killed in an accident at the Nürburgring circuit
