= Chernushka =

Chernushka (Russian: Чернушка) is the name of several inhabited localities in Russia.

Urban localities

- Chernushka, Chernushinsky District, Perm Krai, a town in Chernushinsky District of Perm Krai

Rural localities

- Chernushka, Arbazhsky District, Kirov Oblast, a village in Shembetsky Rural Okrug of Arbazhsky District in Kirov Oblast; 57°44′N 48°15′E
- Chernushka, Kilmezsky District, Kirov Oblast, a settlement in Chernushsky Rural Okrug of Kilmezsky District in Kirov Oblast; 56°59′N 50°47′E
- Chernushka, Komi Republic, a village in Verkholuzye selo Administrative Territory of Priluzsky District in the Komi Republic; 59°56′N 48°41′E
- Chernushka, Kurgan Oblast, a village in Zyryansky Selsoviet of Kataysky District in Kurgan Oblast; 56°14′N 62°6′E
- Chernushka, Mari El Republic, a settlement in Sidorovsky Rural Okrug of Medvedevsky District in the Mari El Republic; 56°30′N 47°53′E
- Chernushka, Chaykovsky, Perm Krai, a settlement under the administrative jurisdiction of the town of krai significance of Chaykovsky in Perm Krai
- Chernushka, Tver Oblast, a village in Nelidovskoye Rural Settlement of Nelidovsky District in Tver Oblast
- Chernushka, Udmurt Republic, a village in Churovsky Selsoviet of Yakshur-Bodyinsky District in the Udmurt Republic
- Chernushka, Vologda Oblast, a village in Zelentsovsky Selsoviet of Nikolsky District in Vologda Oblast
