= Saint-Martin-la-Plaine =

- Commune
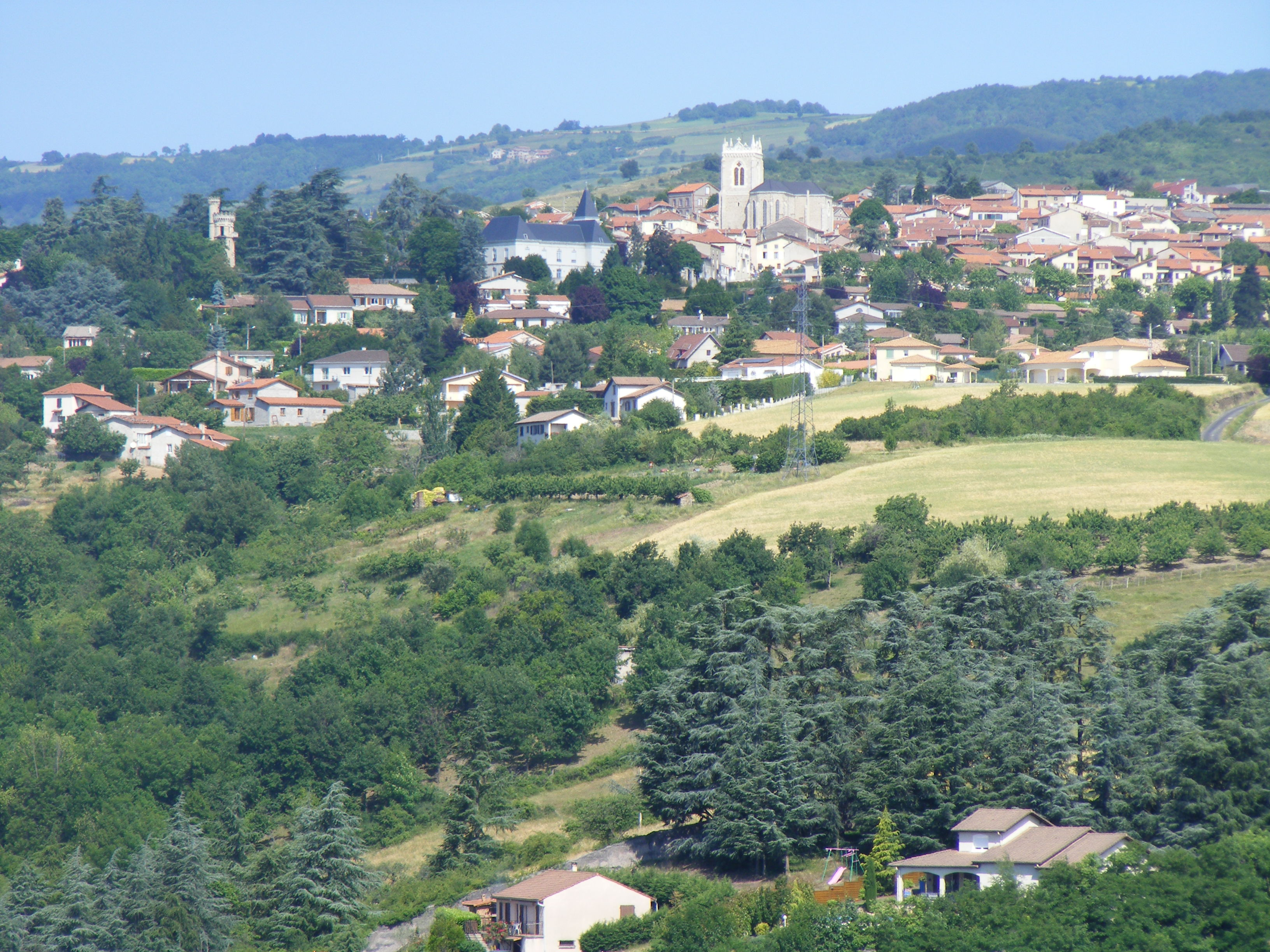

- Coat of arms
- Location of Saint-Martin-la-Plaine
- Location within France Location within Auvergne-Rhône-Alpes
- Coordinates: 45°32′48″N 4°35′36″E
- Country: France
- Region: Auvergne-Rhône-Alpes
- Department: Loire
- Arrondissement: Saint-Étienne
- Canton: Rive-de-Gier
- Intercommunality: Saint-Étienne Métropole

Government
  - Mayor (2020–2026): Martial Fauchet
- Area^{1}: 9.7 km^{2} (3.7 sq mi)
- Elevation: 430 m (1,410 ft)
- Highest elevation: 630 m (2,070 ft)
- Lowest elevation: 257 m (843 ft)
- Population (2023): 3,764
  - Density: 390/km^{2} (1,000/sq mi)
- Time zone: UTC+01:00 (CET)
  - Summer (DST): UTC+02:00 (CEST)
- INSEE/Postal code: 42259 /42800
- ^{1} French Land Register data, which excludes lakes, ponds, glaciers > 1 km^{2} (0.386 sq mi or 247 acres) and river estuaries.

Saint-Martin-la-Plaine (French pronunciation: [sɛ̃ maʁtɛ̃ la plɛn]) is a commune in the Loire department in central France.

== Population ==
Historical population

Year	Pop.	±% p.a.
1793	1,709	—
1821	1,689	−0.04%
1846	2,096	+0.87%
1872	1,643	−0.93%
1901	1,715	+0.15%
1926	1,510	−0.51%
1946	1,503	−0.02%
1962	1,879	+1.41%
1968	1,956	+0.67%

Year	Pop.	±% p.a.
1975	2,311	+2.41%
1982	2,430	+0.72%
1990	3,168	+3.37%
1999	3,424	+0.87%
2007	3,621	+0.70%
2012	3,705	+0.46%
2017	3,755	+0.27%
2023	3,764	+0.04%

Source: EHESS and INSEE (1968-2023)

== Twin towns ==
Saint-Martin-la-Plaine is twinned with:

- Igensdorf, Germany, since 1992

== See also ==
- Communes of the Loire department
