= Rüsselbach =

- Ortsteil of Igensdorf
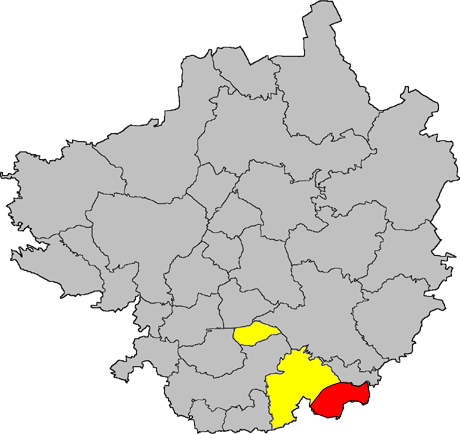
- Location of Rüsselbach in the district of Forchheim
- Interactive map of Rüsselbach
- Location within Germany Location within Bavaria
- Coordinates: 49°36′25″N 11°15′23″E
- Country: Germany
- State: Bavaria
- Admin. region: Oberfranken
- District: Forchheim
- Municipality: Igensdorf

Population
  - Total: 950
- Time zone: UTC+01:00 (CET)
  - Summer (DST): UTC+02:00 (CEST)
- Postal codes: 91338
- Dialling codes: 09192

Rüsselbach is a part of the municipality of Igensdorf in Upper Franconia in Bavaria, Germany, and consists of the districts Unterrüsselbach, Mittelrüsselbach, Kirchrüsselbach and Oberrüsselbach as well as of the hamlets Lindenhof, Lindenmühle, Weidenbühl and Weidenmühle.

== History ==
The history of this small village with its about 950 inhabitants which is situated on the rim of the Franconian Swiss dates back to the far past.

The area of Rüsselbach was already settled in the Bronze Age. This is witnessed by the tumulis in the close-by Eichenlohe-copse. Above Rüsselbach, on the so-called „Katz“, one still can see the defense system of a robber-knight’s castle called Hainburg from the early Middle Ages.

Local historians date the colonization on the left shores of the river Schwabach back to the time around 900 a.c..

Although some people claim that Rüsselbach was already founded as early as in 742 a.c., which corresponds with the foundation of the diocese Eichstätt, to which Rüsselbach belonged in the beginning, the first proven reference in a document was only in 1010 a.c. in a deed of emperor Henry II.

The parish of Kirchrüsselbach situated at half height right in the middle of the two hills “Katz” and “Kuhberg” with its church that was hallowed to the apostle Jacob and is now a Protestant-Lutheran fortified church, consisted already of 40 villages those days.

Although the lordship above Rüsselbach changed several times throughout the following centuries, the size of the parish remained unchanged.

The following changes in lordship are known:

- 1010 bestowal of the area from emperor Henry II to the diocese Bamberg
- Later the ownership was passed to the Staufer
- 1109 ownership passend on to the noble men of Wildenstein
- from 1268 together with Hiltpoltstein under the rule of the Wittelsbacher
- 1353 bailment of the parish to the Bohemian King Charles IV
- 1503 acquisition of the biggest part of Rüsselbach through the free imperial city of Nuremberg

The oldest building in Rüsselbach is still the fortified church in Kirchrüsselbach. The frescoes in the sanctuary are said to be from around 1200 a.c.. The Protestant-Lutheran church received its nowadays face with its remodelling during the years 1777 and 1779. The baptistry derives from the year 1841, the altar-piece from the year 1842.

On 1 January 1972 Rüsselbach became part of the municipality of Igensdorf and lost its autonomy.

== Rüsselbach today ==
Today Rüsselbach is a rural village in the catchment area of the metropol region of Nuremberg. Most of its population is commuting to the surrounding bigger cities. Retail sellers are no longer at place. Only one pub of formerly up to six ones survived until today. Only a handful of farmyards are still active in farming, and then only in sideline. Oberrüsselbach with its high view over the valley has a big community of artists and creative people.

Rüsselbach, as a part of the municipality of Igensdorf, belongs to European’s leading cherry-cultivating area.

Once a year Oberrüsselbach hosts a Japanese cherry blossom feast.

On the plateau above Rüsselbach the gliding airfield of Lauf-Lillinghof is situated.

== Anniversary 2010 ==
2010 Rüsselbach and its hamlets celebrate their 1000th anniversary of their foundation.

== Associations ==
The life in the associations is rich and has also a tradition of over 100 years.

Following associations are situated in Rüsselbach (year of foundation in brackets):

- Male Choral Society (1897)
- Auxiliary Fire Brigade (1897)
- Veteran- and Soldier Association Rüsselbach (1919)
- Brass Band (13. November 1927)
- Female Choir (1971)
- Shooting Club Rüsselbach (1973)
- Sports Association Rüsselbach (1978)
- Municipal Improvement Association (1980)
- Development Association Rüsselbach (2009)

== Sources ==
- About the history of Rüsselbach – in German only (PDF; 22 kB)
- contains pictures of the village-life in Rüsselbach as of the past until today as well as plenty of information about the anniversary in 2010
