= Arbazh =

Arbazh Арбаж
- Urban-type settlement
- Interactive map of Arbazh
- Location of Arbazh Arbazh (Kirov Oblast)
- Coordinates: 57°40′50″N 48°18′23″E
- Country: Russia
- Federal subject: Kirov Oblast
- Administrative district: Arbazhsky District
- Elevation: 110 m (360 ft)

Population (2010 Census)
  - Total: 3,563
  - Estimate (2025): 2,339 (−34.4%)

Administrative status
  - Capital of: Arbazhsky District

Municipal status
  - Municipal district: Arbazhsky Municipal District
  - Urban settlement: Arbazhskoye Urban Settlement
  - Capital of: Arbazhsky Municipal District, Arbazhskoye Urban Settlement
- Time zone: UTC+3 (MSK)
- Postal code: 612180
- OKTMO ID: 33602151051

Arbazh (Russian: Арбаж) is an urban-type settlement and the administrative center of Arbazhsky District of Kirov Oblast, Russia. Population: 3,563 (2010 census); 4,067 (2002 census); 4,927 (1989 Soviet census).
