= Arbazhsky District =

Arbazhsky District Арбажский район
- District
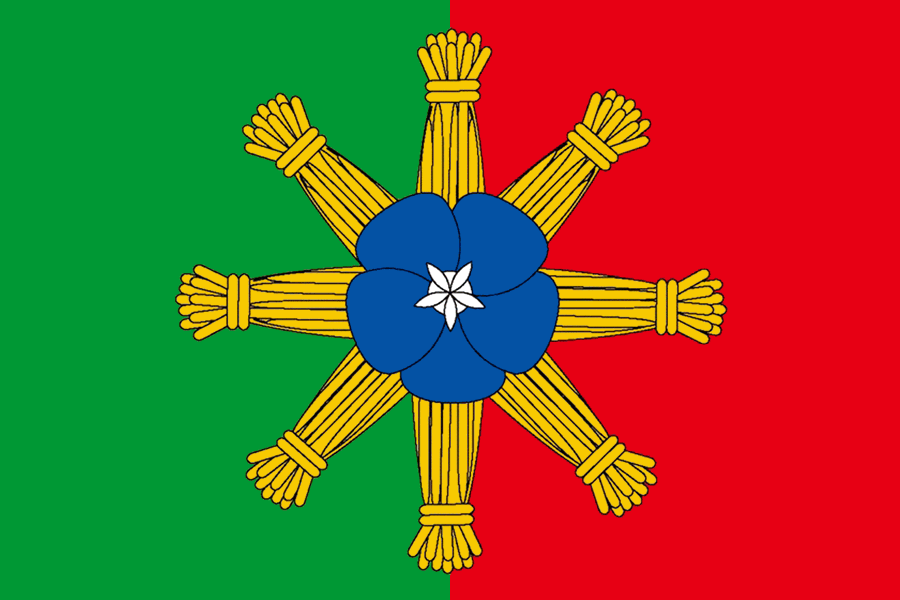
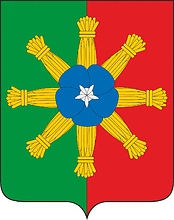
- Flag Coat of arms
- Location of Arbazhsky District in Kirov Oblast
- Coordinates: 57°41′N 48°18′E
- Country: Russia
- Federal subject: Kirov Oblast
- Established: 15 July 1929
- Administrative center: Arbazh

Area
  - Total: 1,416 km^{2} (547 sq mi)

Population (2010 Census)
  - Total: 7,328
  - Density: 5.175/km^{2} (13.40/sq mi)
  - Urban: 48.6%
  - Rural: 51.4%

Administrative structure
  - Administrative divisions: 1 Urban-type settlements, 4 Rural okrugs
  - Inhabited localities: 1 urban-type settlements, 81 rural localities

Municipal structure
  - Municipally incorporated as: Arbazhsky Municipal District
  - Municipal divisions: 1 urban settlements, 4 rural settlements
- Time zone: UTC+3 (MSK)
- OKTMO ID: 33602000
- Website: http://mo-arbazh.ru/

Arbazhsky District (Russian: Арба́жский райо́н) is an administrative and municipal district (raion), one of the thirty-nine in Kirov Oblast, Russia. It is located in the southwest of the oblast. The area of the district is 1,416 square kilometers (547 sq mi). Its administrative center is the urban locality (an urban-type settlement) of Arbazh. Population: 7,328 (2010 Census); 9,647 (2002 Census); 11,933 (1989 Soviet census). The population of Arbazh accounts for 48.6% of the district's total population.
