= Clete Turner =

Australian rules footballer

Personal information
- Full name: Cletus Handley Francis Turner
- Born: 23 April 1909; Colac, Victoria
- Died: 19 April 1961 (aged 51)
- Original team: Cressy
- Height: 170 cm (5 ft 7 in)
- Weight: 71 kg (157 lb)

Playing career^{1}
Years	Club	Games (Goals)
1932	Geelong	5 (0)
1933–1934	Fitzroy	15 (3)
1935	Carlton	19 (3)
Total		39 (6)
- ^{1} Playing statistics correct to the end of 1935.

Cletus Handley Francis Turner (23 April 1909 – 19 April 1961) was an Australian rules footballer who played with Carlton, Fitzroy and Geelong in the Victorian Football League (VFL).
