= ČSA Flight 511 (March 1961) =

1961 aviation accident

Czechoslovak Airlines Flight 511
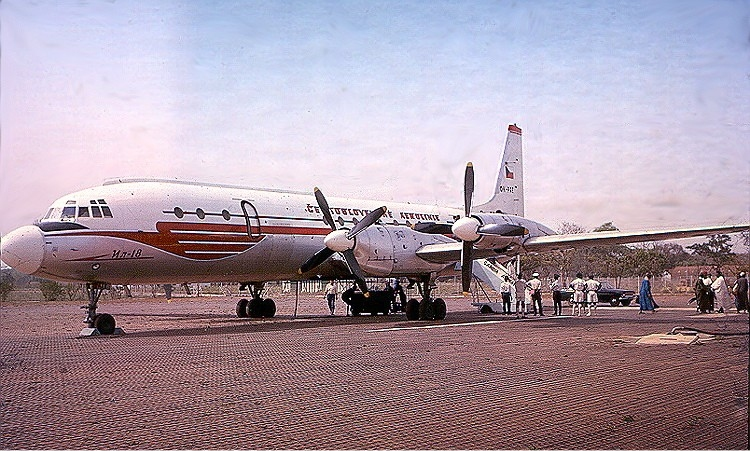
- A ČSA Ilyushin Il-18 similar to the crashed aircraft

Accident
- Date: 28 March 1961
- Summary: In-flight breakup for unknown reasons; possible bomb explosion, pilot error or an autopilot malfunction
- Site: Igensdorf, West Germany now Germany; 49°37′N 11°15′E

Aircraft
- Aircraft type: Ilyushin Il-18V
- Operator: ČSA (Československé Státní Aerolinie)
- Registration: OK-OAD
- Flight origin: Prague Ruzyně Airport, Prague, Czechoslovakia now the Czech Republic
- 1st stopover: Kloten Airport, Zurich, Switzerland
- 2nd stopover: Rabat, Morocco
- 3rd stopover: Dakar, Senegal
- Last stopover: Conakry, Guinea
- Destination: Bamako, Mali
- Occupants: 52
- Passengers: 44
- Crew: 8
- Fatalities: 52
- Injuries: 0
- Survivors: 0

Czechoslovak Airlines (ČSA) Flight 511 was a flight operated by an Ilyushin Il-18 that crashed in Igensdorf near Nuremberg on 28 March 1961 while flying across West Germany.

A German investigation commission stated that the primary cause of the accident was pilot error or an autopilot malfunction. Soviet investigators dismissed this conclusion and stated that the accident was caused by an explosion near the tail of the plane.
