= ČSA Flight 511 (July 1961) =

Fatal aviation accident

Coordinates: 33.4403°N 7.7158°W

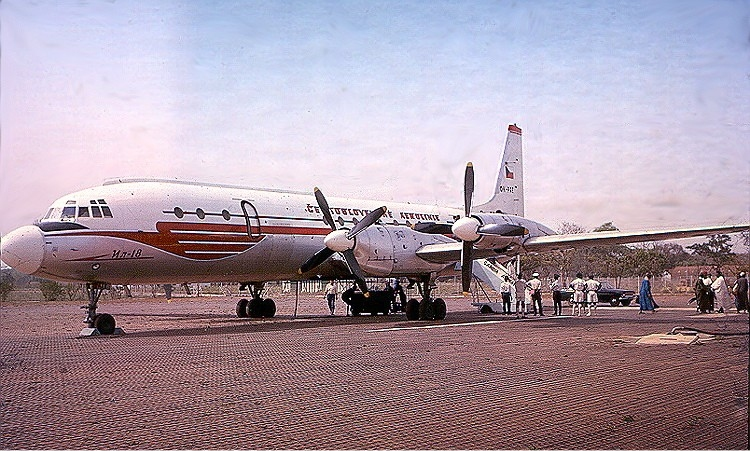
- A ČSA Ilyushin Il-18 similar to the crashed aircraft

Accident
- Date: July 12, 1961
- Summary: Controlled flight into terrain, cause undetermined
- Site: Casablanca-Anfa Airport, Morocco

Aircraft
- Aircraft type: Ilyushin Il-18V
- Operator: ČSA (Československé Státní Aerolinie)
- Registration: OK-PAF
- Flight origin: Kloten Airport, Zurich
- Destination: Rabat-Sale Airport
- Passengers: 64
- Crew: 8
- Fatalities: 72
- Survivors: 0

ČSA Flight 511 was a flight operated by an Ilyushin Il-18 that crashed near Casablanca-Anfa Airport in Morocco on July 12, 1961. All 72 people on board were killed. The cause of the crash remains undetermined.
