= Igensdorf =

- Municipality
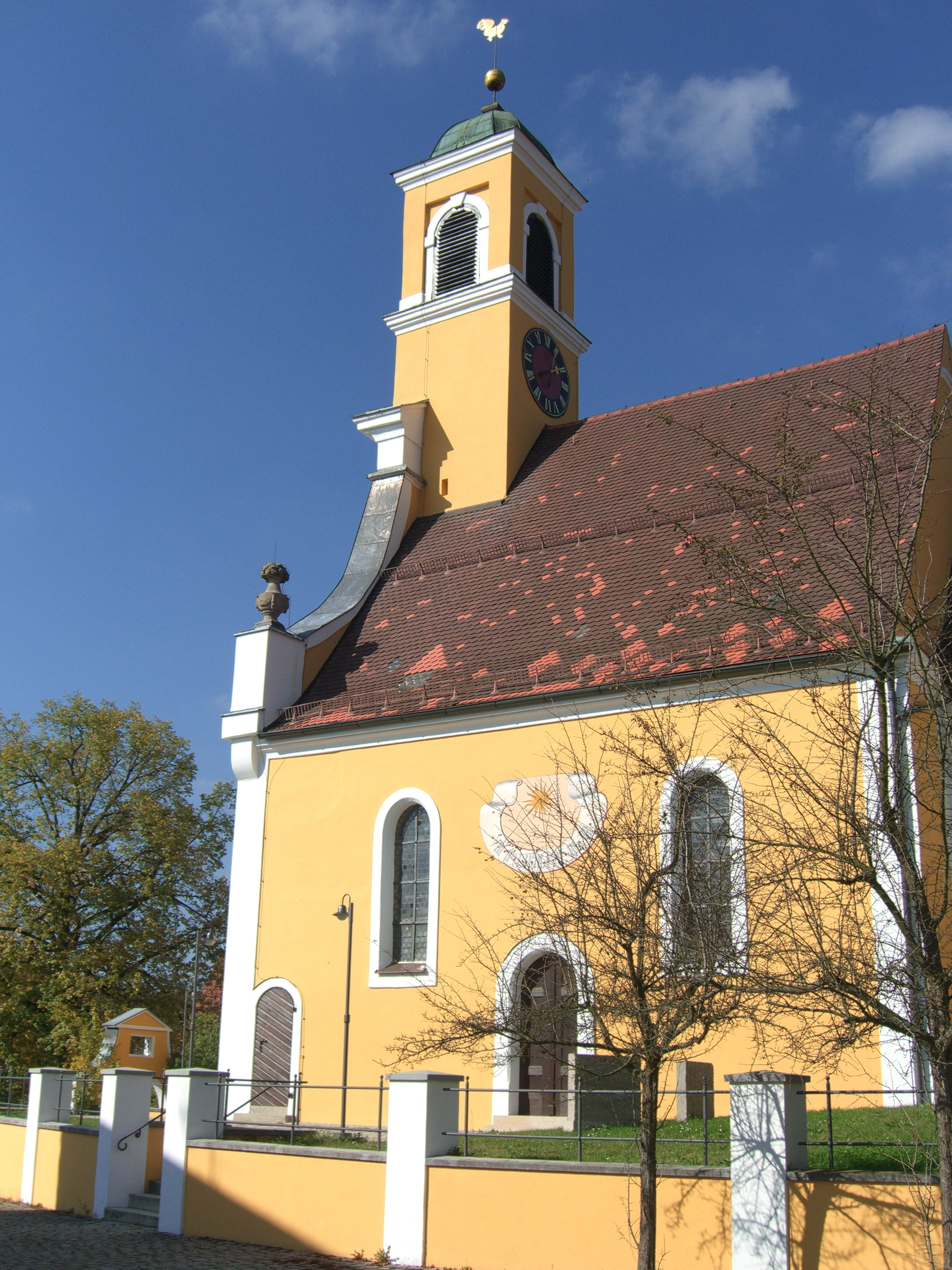
- Church of Saint George

- Coat of arms

- Location of Igensdorf within Forchheim district
- Interactive map of Igensdorf
- Location within Germany Location within Bavaria
- Coordinates: 49°37′N 11°14′E
- Country: Germany
- State: Bavaria
- Admin. region: Oberfranken
- District: Forchheim
- Subdivisions: 25 Ortsteile

Government
  - Mayor (2020–26): Edmund Ulm (CSU)

Area
  - Total: 28.83 km^{2} (11.13 sq mi)
- Elevation: 314–549 m (1,030–1,801 ft)

Population (2025-12-31)
  - Total: 5,057
  - Density: 175.4/km^{2} (454.3/sq mi)
- Time zone: UTC+01:00 (CET)
  - Summer (DST): UTC+02:00 (CEST)
- Postal codes: 91338
- Dialling codes: 09192, 09126 (Eckental)
- Vehicle registration: FO
- Website: www.igensdorf.de

Igensdorf (German pronunciation: [ˈiːɡn̩sdɔʁf]) is a municipality in the district of Forchheim in Bavaria in Germany.

== Twin towns ==
Igensdorf is twinned with:

- Saint-Martin-la-Plaine, France, since 1992
