= October 1961 =

Month of 1961

<<	October 1961					>>
Su	Mo	Tu	We	Th	Fr	Sa
1	2	3	4	5	6	7
8	9	10	11	12	13	14
15	16	17	18	19	20	21
22	23	24	25	26	27	28
29	30	31

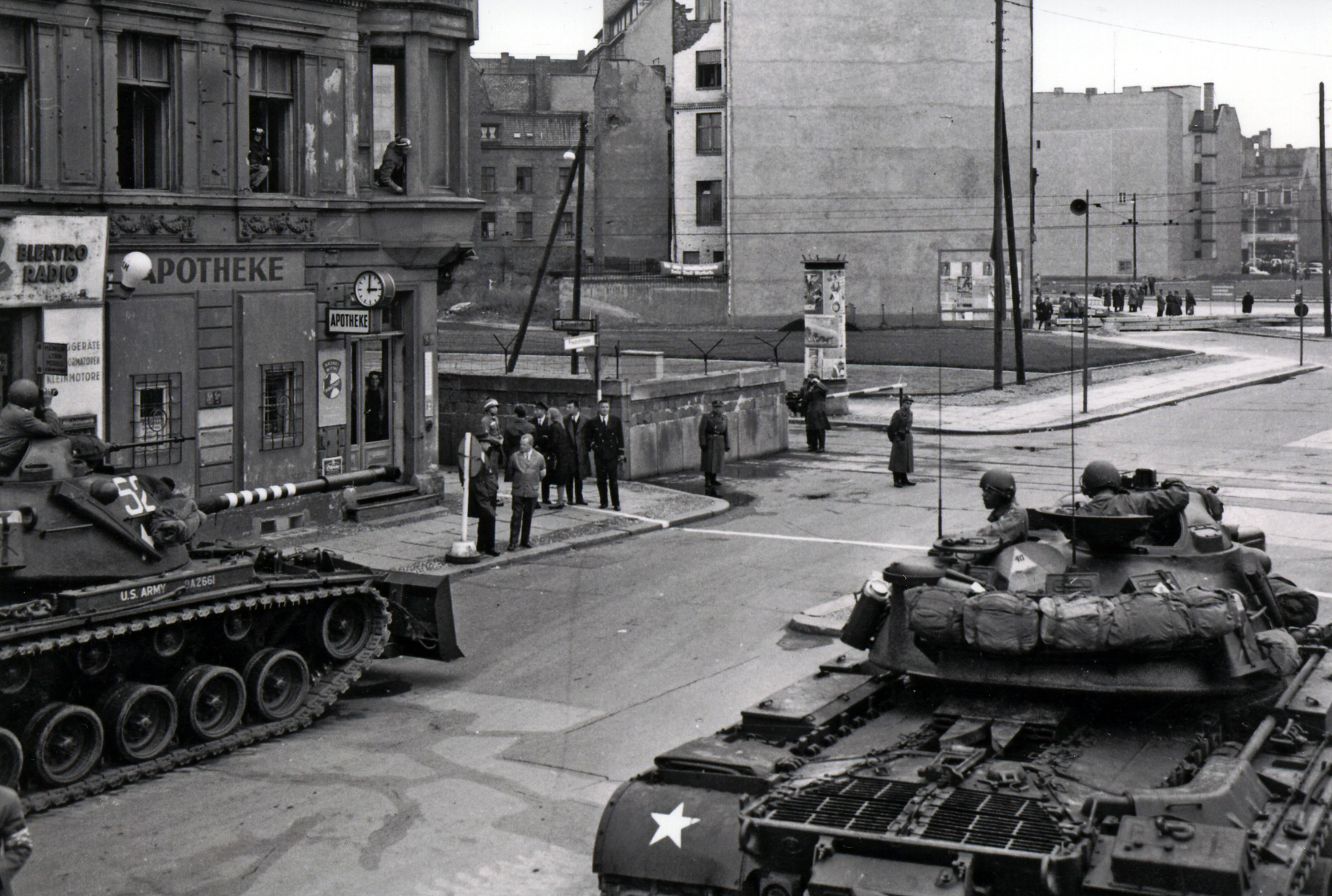
October 27–28, 1961: U.S. tanks and Soviet tanks face off for 16 hours at the border between East and West Berlin.

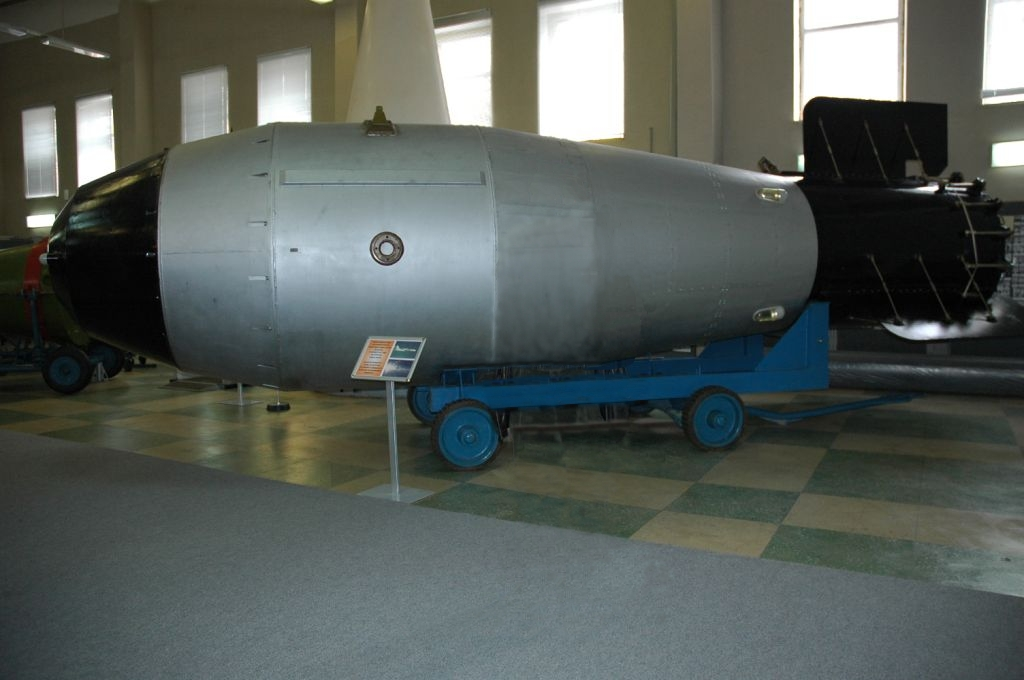
October 30, 1961: 50-megaton Tsar Bomba, largest nuclear weapon, tested by Soviet Union.

The following events occurred in October 1961:

== October 1, 1961 (Sunday) ==
- The CTV Television Network was launched at 6:30 p.m. on eight stations across Canada, with the one-hour program "Sneak Preview- glimpses of things to come", followed by 77 Sunset Strip at 7:30. The first Canadian program shown, after the 10:30 news and sports, was the game show Scrimmage at 10:50.

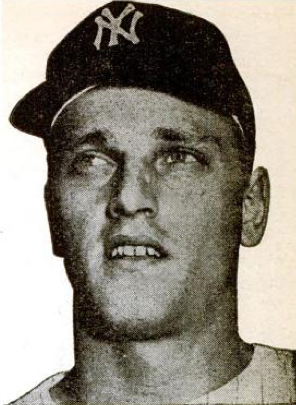
Maris

- Baseball player Roger Maris of the New York Yankees hit his 61st home run in the last game of the season, against the Boston Red Sox, beating the 34-year-old record held by Babe Ruth. The homer was made at 2:43 p.m. at Yankee Stadium, off of Boston pitcher Tracy Stallard, in the game's fourth inning. The run won the game, 1–0. Sal Durante, a 19-year-old spectator, got the baseball and won $5,000 and other prizes.
- Evangelist Pat Robertson began religious broadcasting on WTFC Channel 27, a UHF television station in Portsmouth, Virginia. He would later beam the programming by satellite to cable systems nationwide as the Christian Broadcasting Network.
- Advertising executive Lester Wunderman coined the phrase "direct marketing" in a speech in New York to the Hundred Million Club, an organization of businesspeople using direct mail.
- The Federal Republic of Cameroon came into existence with the merger of the Republic of Cameroun, former French Cameroon and part of the former British Cameroons.
- Factory roll-out inspection was made of an Atlas booster for the Mercury-Atlas 5 (MA-5) mission, and the booster was delivered on October 9.
- The United States Defense Intelligence Agency (DIA), the country's first centralized military espionage organization, was formed.
- In the UK soap Coronation Street, two major characters, Harry Hewitt and Concepta Riley, married on screen.
- The first SIP1 launch by the U.S. Navy was successful, reaching an apogee of 20 kilometres (12 mi).
- Died:
  - David Pratt, 53, South African farmer who shot and wounded South African Prime Minister Hendrik Verwoerd on April 9, 1960, committed suicide.
  - Donald Cook, 60, American stage and film actor

== October 2, 1961 (Monday) ==
- The ABC network medical drama Ben Casey, starring Vince Edwards in the title role, premiered in the evening, four days after the premiere of the NBC medical drama Dr. Kildare and began a run of five seasons. Comparing the two, Associated Press critic Cynthia Lowry noted that "While there's a marked family resemblance to NBC's new 'Dr. Kildare,' this one is more clinical, more pre-occupied with operating room scenes and medical procedures."
- French President Charles de Gaulle delivered a televised address in France and French Algeria, outlining his plans to allow Algerian residents to determine their own future, and pledged to work toward the creation of a "strictly Algerian" security force. He also stated that, if necessary, he would again invoke the national emergency powers that he had allowed to expire two days earlier.
- The Shipping Corporation of India, one of India's largest companies, was created by the merger of the Eastern Shipping Corporation and the Western Shipping Corporation.
- The television game show Password was first telecast, with Allen Ludden as its host.
- WETA-TV, the first public television station in Washington, D.C., went on air.

== October 3, 1961 (Tuesday) ==
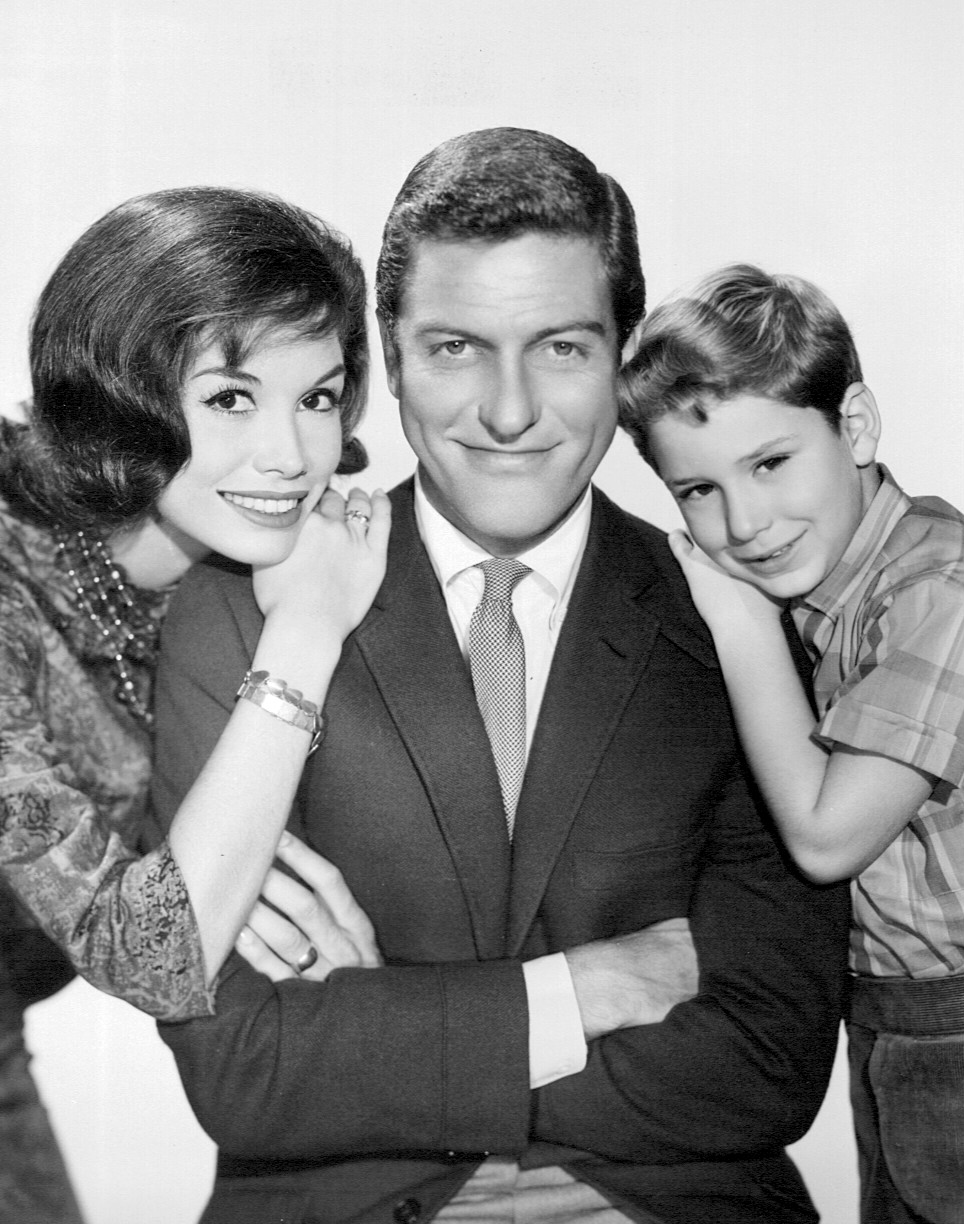
Laura, Rob and Richie of the Petrie family on The Dick Van Dyke Show

- The Dick Van Dyke Show, starring Dick Van Dyke, Mary Tyler Moore, Rose Marie and Morey Amsterdam, was shown for the first time, making its debut at 8:00 p.m. EST on CBS. Although the show would go on to become very popular, the initial telecast, competing against Bachelor Father (ABC) and Laramie (NBC) attracted so few viewers that it was not even among the Top 70 most popular programs that week.
- The Motion Picture Association of America (MPAA), which gives its stamp of approval and restrictions on films in the United States, changed its production code, declaring that "In keeping with the culture, the mores and the values of our time, homosexuality and other sexual aberrations may now be treated with care, discretion and restraint," adding that such "aberrations" "could be suggested but not actually spelled out". The change was believed to have been prompted by the filming of the Allen Drury novel Advise and Consent.
- Born: Vittorio Colao, Italian business executive and CEO of the Vodafone Group; in Brescia

== October 4, 1961 (Wednesday) ==
- Police in McComb, Mississippi, United States, arrested and jailed 113 African-American high school and junior high school students, after the group walked out of Burgland High School and marched to City Hall, protesting the expulsion of two students who had participated in a sit-in earlier in the year.
- In the Irish general election, Fianna Fáil, led by Seán Lemass, lost its majority of 77 out of 144 seats, dropping to 70, but still retained the plurality and was able to form a government. Lemass continued as the Taoiseach (Prime Minister).
- The Alvin Show, the first TV series to feature Alvin and the Chipmunks, premiered on CBS in the United States.
- Born:
  - Kazuki Takahashi, Japanese manga artist best known as the author of Yu-Gi-Oh!; in Tokyo (died by drowning, 2022)
  - Jon Secada, Cuban-born American singer, winner of two Grammy Awards; in Havana

== October 5, 1961 (Thursday) ==
- Starting with the federal income tax returns filed after December 31, 1962, all American taxpayers were required to supply social security numbers for themselves and their claimed dependents, as President Kennedy signed public law 87–398, an amendment to the United States Tax Code. People who did not have a social security number could apply to the Internal Revenue Service for a separate identifying number, and the initial failure to comply with the law in 1963 would be punishable by "a penalty of $5 for each such failure". The Code would further be amended on October 4, 1976, to require that everyone have a social security number.
- Maurice Papon, the Paris Chief of Police, issued a religion-specific curfew against all "Muslim Algerian workers" within the jurisdiction of his prefecture, even though they were considered citizens of France. The curfew order decreed that the Muslims were "advised most urgently" to stay indoors between 8:30 p.m. and 5:30 a.m. A protest by 30,000 of those affected twelve days later led to the Paris massacre of 1961.
- The Ninth Hague Conference on Private International Law concluded in The Hague, Netherlands, with the signing of the Hague Convention Abolishing the Requirement for Legalisation for Foreign Public Documents and the Hague Convention of 1961 Concerning the Powers of Authorities and the Law Applicable in Respect of the Protection of Minors.
- King Mahendra of Nepal and China's President Liu Shaoqi signed an agreement in Beijing defining the border between the mountain kingdom and its large Communist neighbor.
- Died:
  - Don Barbour, 34, vocalist of the jazz vocal group "The Four Freshmen", was killed in an auto accident.
  - Booker Little, 23, jazz musician, died of complications resulting from uremia.

== October 6, 1961 (Friday) ==
- The "Schiessbefehl" (literally, "order to shoot") was formally issued by General Heinz Hoffmann, the Minister of National Defense for East Germany, spelling out the rules for shooting anyone who attempted to escape from the German Democratic Republic. After a shouted warning and the firing of a warning shot, guards were ordered to fire their weapons at anyone clearly planning "to violate the state frontier".
- In leadership changes in the Lagting, Nils Hønsvald became President of the Lagting (composed of the senior one-fourth of the membership) and Per Borten became President of the Odelsting for the other three-fourths.

== October 7, 1961 (Saturday) ==
- All 34 people on board a British airliner were killed when the Douglas C47 Dakota crashed in the Pyrenees Mountains at Mont Canigou in France. The flight by Derby Aviation, a subsidiary of British Midland Airways, was primarily carrying British tourists who were on holiday to make a tour of Spain.

== October 8, 1961 (Sunday) ==
- The first of at least 134 residents of East Berlin escaped to the West through a manhole that led to an underground sewer that ran underneath the Berlin Wall. West German students Dieter Thieme and Detlef Girmann organized the Unternehmen Reisebüro, also called the "Girmann Group". The operation lasted for four nights until East German police learned what was happening and closed off the route.
- U.S. Republican political consultant F. Clifton White convened the first meeting of the "Draft Goldwater Committee", inviting 22 friends from across the nation to gather at the Avenue Motel in Chicago. From the gathering began a movement to united conservative Republicans in securing the nomination of Arizona U.S. Senator Barry M. Goldwater to run in the 1964 U.S. presidential election.
- The 1961 Formula One season concluded with the running of the 230-mile (370 km) United States Grand Prix in Watkins Glen, New York, won by Innes Ireland. Phil Hill, who had already won the Driver's Championship on points, did not participate in the race.
- Died:
  - Tom Howard, 67, American photographer best known for his photograph of the execution of Ruth Snyder at Sing Sing Prison
  - Moshe Smoira, 72, first President of the Supreme Court of Israel from 1948 to 1954

== October 9, 1961 (Monday) ==
- In upholding the constitutionality of the 1950 Subversive Activities Control Act, the United States Supreme Court ruled that the Communist Party of the United States of America would be required to register as an agent of the Soviet Union, and to reveal its membership list and finances. CPUSA General Secretary Gus Hall said that the Party would refuse to comply.
- The New York Yankees won the World Series in the 5th game, defeating the Cincinnati Reds, 13–5, to take baseball's championship 4 games to 1.
- Skelmersdale, Lancashire, UK, was designated a new town.

== October 10, 1961 (Tuesday) ==
- All 260 residents of the South Atlantic island of Tristan da Cunha were evacuated by two small fishing boats, following a volcanic eruption that destroyed the crayfish canning factory that was the source of many islanders' livelihood. The group then spent the night on Nightingale Island, an 0.75-square-mile (1.9 km^{2}) patch of rock, 13 miles (21 km) away, to await the arrival of the Dutch liner MS Tjisadane, which took them to South Africa.
- The day after stockholders approved a merger of two companies, the Martin Marietta Corporation was created from the merger of aircraft manufacturer Glenn L. Martin Company and the chemical manufacturer American-Marietta Corporation. It would on to become one of the 100 largest corporations in the United States.
- The United Kingdom began negotiations with the six-member European Economic Community to seek membership in the Common Market, with an opening speech in Paris by Prime Minister Harold Macmillan.
- The Tuvan Autonomous Soviet Socialist Republic was created as part of the Russian Republic of the Soviet Union.
- Born: Jodi Benson, American voice actress known for being the voice of Ariel in The Little Mermaid and its sequels; in Rockford, Illinois

== October 11, 1961 (Wednesday) ==
- U.S. President John F. Kennedy announced the appointment of the President's Panel on Mental Retardation, stating "We as a nation have, for too long, postponed an intensive search for solutions to the problems of the mentally retarded. That failure should be corrected." The President's Panel would make 95 recommendations, many of which would be passed into law, bringing to an end the common practice of institutionalizing mentally disabled individuals.
- In a press conference at the Marshall Space Flight Center at Huntsville, Alabama, Future Projects Office Director Heinz-Hermann Koelle delivered the Space Flight Report to the Nation, predicting that commercial spaceflights to and from the Moon could begin as early as 1975, with a permanent moonbase by 1970 and crewed expeditions to other planets beginning in 1972.
- Flying an X-15, USAF Major Robert Michael White set a record for highest flight by an airplane, reaching an altitude of 215,000 feet (66,000 m), more than 40 miles (64 km) above the Earth, 8 miles (13 km) higher than the previous record. On his descent, the outer windshield of the X-15 cracked, but White was unharmed.
- The United States increased its presence in South Vietnam as President Kennedy authorized the deployment of an entire U.S. Air Force unit, the 4400th Combat Crew Training Squadron, to fly combat missions from the Bien Hoa Air Base.
- After years of atmospheric tests, the Soviet Union conducted an underground nuclear explosion for the first time. Based on the success of the test, the Soviets joined other nuclear nations four months later in doing underground tests only.
- The Bob Newhart Show, a variety show not to be confused with a later sitcom of the same name, premiered on NBC. It would run for one season.
- The Cherry Hill Mall opened in Cherry Hill, New Jersey, near Philadelphia, as the first American indoor shopping mall east of the Mississippi River.
- Born: Steve Young, American football quarterback Pro Football Hall of Fame inductee, player in the NFL and USFL; in Salt Lake City
- Died:
  - Chico Marx (stage name for Leonard Joseph Marx), 74, American comedian, the oldest of the Marx Brothers and the first to pass away
  - Princess Dagmar of Denmark, 71, youngest child of King Frederik VIII and the last of his children to pass away

== October 12, 1961 (Thursday) ==
- The New Zealand House of Representatives voted 41–30 to amend the Crimes Bill of 1961 to abolish the death penalty for all crimes except for treason. Capital punishment for murder had been abolished in 1941 and then restored in 1950, and the last hanging was carried out in 1957. The maximum penalty for aggravated murder was set at life imprisonment.
- The National Bowling League, with 10 teams, made its debut as the Dallas Broncos defeated the visiting New York Gladiators, 22–2, before a crowd of 2,000. The NBL folded two months after it crowned its first and only champion, the Detroit Thunderbirds, who beat the Twin Cities Skippers on May 6, 1962.
- The 1961 Coppa Italia motor race was won by Giancarlo Baghetti.
- Died:
  - Eugene Bullard, 67, the first African-American combat pilot, who served with the French Foreign Legion during World War I
  - Maria Valtorta, 64, Italian writer who wrote of her visions of Mary and Jesus

== October 13, 1961 (Friday) ==
- Marjorie Michelmore, a 26-year-old volunteer for the Peace Corps in newly independent Nigeria, caused an international incident when she accidentally dropped a postcard that she had intended to send to a friend back in the United States. The card, which read in part, "we were really not prepared for the squalor and absolutely primitive living conditions rampant both in the cities and the bush", was found by a student, mimeographed and distributed, and led to protests by university students against the presence of the Corps. However, another volunteer recalled later, "A dialogue began between students and the Volunteers — more valuable than if the incident had not taken place."
- Prince Louis Rwagasore, the popular eldest son of King Mwambutasa who had been selected by the new legislature to be the first Prime Minister of Burundi in advance of the African nation's independence from Belgium, was assassinated. Rwagasaore was dining with his cabinet at a restaurant on Lake Tanganyika, when he was killed by a single shot fired by Jean Kageorgis, a Greek national. "Perhaps no other event has weighed more heavily on the destinies of Burundi," noted one historian, adding that "many believe that if only fate had given him a chance, he might have spared his nation the traumas that would soon tear it apart."
- After three years as part of the United Arab Republic, the nation of Syria resumed its membership in the United Nations General Assembly as the Syrian Arab Republic.
- NASA Headquarters approved construction projects for what would become the Johnson Space Center installation in Texas at Clear Lake, southeast of Houston.
- HMS Leopard arrived at Tristan da Cunha to find a mound 250 ft (80 m) in height, emitting smoke and red-hot lava.
- Died:
  - Maya Deren (Eleonora Derenkowska), 44, Ukrainian-born avant-garde American filmmaker known for Meshes of the Afternoon, died of a cerebral hemorrhage
  - Zoltán Korda, 66, Hungarian and British filmmaker
  - Dun Karm Psaila, 89, Maltese writer

== October 14, 1961 (Saturday) ==
- For twelve hours, all commercial flights in the United States and Canada were grounded in order to conduct the NORAD exercise Operation Sky Shield II. Starting, as scheduled, at 1:00 p.m. Washington, D.C. time, civilian airline flights were halted and military planes conducted an exercise simulating a foreign bombing attack on North American targets. Commercial flights were allowed to take off again twelve hours later. It was the longest scheduled halt of air traffic in United States history, exceeded only by the emergency grounding following the September 11 attacks in 2001.
- The Broadway musical How to Succeed in Business Without Really Trying was first performed, opening at the 46th Street Theatre and would run for 1,417 shows, winning a Pulitzer Prize and seven Tony Awards along the way.
- The Town of Seabrook, New Hampshire, which would later share its name with a nuclear power plant, was created, by a 198–13 vote of its residents.
- The Pittsburgh Hornets minor league ice hockey team returned to play after a five-year break, at the Civic Arena.
- Paul Morris became public address announcer for the Toronto Maple Leafs, remaining in the post for 38 years.
- Died:
  - Paul Ramadier, 73, Prime Minister of France in 1947
  - Harriet Shaw Weaver, 85, English political activist

== October 15, 1961 (Sunday) ==
- A massive search commenced for "Pogo 22", a USAF B-52G Stratofortress and its crew of eight, after the bomber failed to return from its mission as part of the Operation Sky Shield II exercise. Neither the bomber, the only one of more than 2,250 that flew that day, nor its crew, was ever found. Although the incident has been cited as "the first time a jet aircraft disappeared in the [Bermuda] Triangle", contact with the bomber was lost near Newfoundland, thousands of miles north of the Bermuda Triangle.
- In democratic elections held after the 1960 military coup in Turkey, the Cumhuriyet Halk Partisi (Republic People's Party), led by İsmet İnönü, won 173 of the 450 seats in the Grand National Assembly, short of a majority, and was forced into forming a coalition government with the Adalet Partisi (Justice Party), which won 158.
- The J. C. Van Horne Bridge over the Restigouche River along the New Brunswick and Quebec border was opened to traffic.

== October 16, 1961 (Monday) ==
- Mastering the Art of French Cooking, the cookbook that would become a bestseller and catapult Julia Child to worldwide fame, was published for the first time. Child's co-authors on the Alfred A. Knopf release were Simone Beck and Louisette Bertholle.
- Cork Airport officially opened as the third international airport in Ireland, four days after "proving flights" by Aer Lingus and Cambrian Airways.
- Born:
  - Marc Levy, French novelist known for Et si c'etait vrai.. (If Only It Were True), later adapted to the film Just like Heaven; in Boulogne-Billancourt, Hauts-de-Seine
  - Kim Wayans, American actress, comedian, producer, writer and director, known for the Fox TV show In Living Color; in New York City

== October 17, 1961 (Tuesday) ==
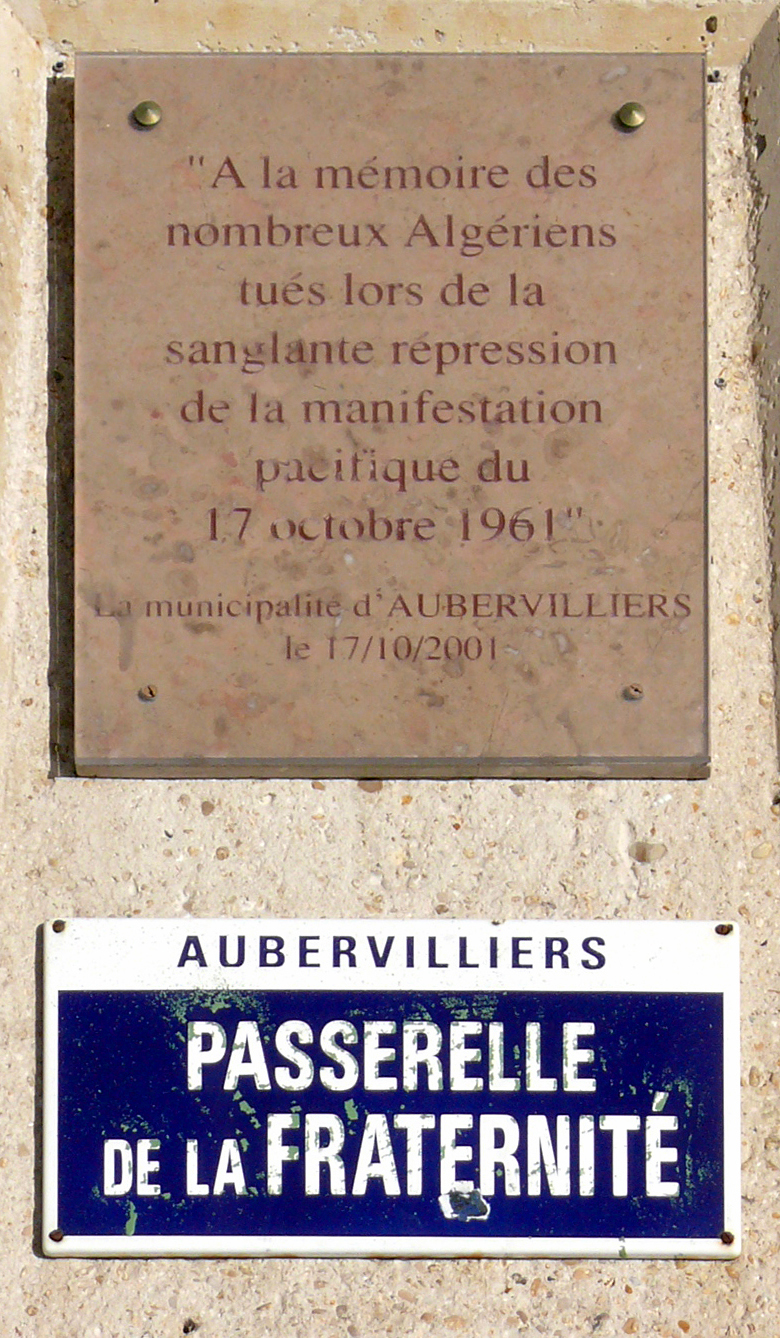
A memorial plaque for the Algerians killed in the massacre

- More than 140 demonstrators were killed by French police in what would become known as the "Paris Massacre", after law enforcement officers fired on a crowd of about 30,000 people who were protesting a curfew applied solely to Algerian Muslims. The actual death toll would be suppressed for more than three decades until the man who had ordered the crackdown, Police Chief Maurice Papon, was put on trial in 1988 for collaboration with Nazi occupiers during World War II. There were 11,538 arrests, with the detainees held in stadiums on the outskirts of the city. The bodies of 74 of the victims were thrown into the Seine River and washed up on its banks later, while another 68 simply disappeared.
- The 22nd Congress of the Communist Party of the Soviet Union was opened in Moscow by CPSU First Secretary Nikita Khrushchev, who made a 6-hour, 20 minute speech. Khrushchev dropped his threat to sign a separate peace treaty with East Germany before year's end. He announced that the Soviets would explode a 50 megaton bomb before the month's end. Khrushchev also claimed that the Soviets had a 100 megaton bomb that would not be tested, he joked, because "we might break our own windows". He criticized Albania's Communist leader, Enver Hoxha of the Albanian Labor Party, for creating a personality cult, and predicted Communism's triumph by 1980; and he denounced many of the former leaders of the USSR for furthering the terror of Joseph Stalin. Condemned by name were former President Kliment Voroshilov, former Foreign Ministers Vyacheslav Molotov and Dmitri Shepilov, former Prime Ministers Georgi Malenkov and Nikolai Bulganin, and former First Deputy Premiers Lazar Kaganovich, Mikhail Pervukhin and Maksim Saburov.
- Former schoolfriends Mick Jagger and Keith Richards, who would later create The Rolling Stones, met each other again by chance on Platform 2 at Dartford railway station in Kent, England, on the way to their respective colleges, and discovered their mutual taste for rock and roll.

== October 18, 1961 (Wednesday) ==
- In the first parliamentary elections in the Republic of South Africa, the all-White electorate cast more than 2/3 of its votes in favor of the National Party, led by apartheid proponent and Prime Minister Hendrik Verwoerd. The Nationalists captured 105 of the 156 seats, with the United Party (led by De Villiers Graaff) getting 49.
- The film West Side Story was released, with its world premiere at New York City's Rivoli Theatre. It would go on to become the highest-grossing film of 1962, and would win ten Academy Awards, including Best Picture.
- The European Social Charter was signed in Turin. It would come into effect on February 26, 1965.
- Born:
  - Gladstone Small, English cricketer with 521 caps for the England cricket team; in Saint George, Barbados
  - Rick Moody, American novelist known for The Ice Storm; in New York City
  - Wynton Marsalis, American jazz musician; in New Orleans

== October 19, 1961 (Thursday) ==
- The city of Hidden Hills, California, a gated community designed by A. E. Hanson in Los Angeles County, California, was incorporated.
- The Arab League took over protecting Kuwait as the last British troops left.
- Died:
  - Sergio Osmeña, 83, President of the Philippines from 1944 to 1946
  - Şemsettin Günaltay, 78, Prime Minister of Turkey from 1949 to 1950
  - Mihail Sadoveanu, 80, nominal head of state of Romania during 1958

== October 20, 1961 (Friday) ==
- The first launch of an armed nuclear warhead on a submarine-launched ballistic missile took place, when a Soviet Golf-class submarine (Project 629) fired an R-13 (SS N-4 Sark) missile from underwater. The 1.45-megaton warhead detonated on the Novaya Zemlya Test Range in the Arctic Ocean. Although the U.S. had test-fired unarmed Polaris missiles, the first American SLBM nuclear detonation would not take place until May 6, 1962.
- The mail ship MV Stirling Castle departed South Africa for the UK with the Tristan da Cunha islanders on board.

== October 21, 1961 (Saturday) ==
- In a speech to business executives in Hot Springs, Virginia, Assistant U.S. Secretary of Defense Roswell Gilpatric revealed that there was no "missile gap" between the United States and the Soviet Union, and that the U.S. actually had the superior nuclear strike force. Gilpatric was authorized by President Kennedy to make the announcement, in response to Soviet Premier Khrushchev's statements four days earlier, stating in part, "we have a second strike capability which is at least as extensive as what the Soviets can deliver by striking first," adding "their Iron Curtain is not so impenetrable as to force us to accept at face value the Kremlin's boasts." At the same time, Gilpatric's speech revealed to the Soviets that the U.S. intelligence had discovered the Soviet shortcomings, and "provoked an embarrassing defeat for Khrushchev's reform program".
- Project West Ford, a U.S. Air Force experiment in putting 480,000,000 copper dipoles into orbit around the Earth to facilitate communication, was carried out with the launch of the Midas 4 satellite. Each "needle" was 1.78 centimetres (0.70 in) long and 25.4 micrometers (or 1/1000 of an inch) thick. However, the payload failed to deploy. A second experiment, launched on May 9, 1963, would succeed in dispersing the "Westford Needles". "Due to the small overall mass involved," it has been noted, "and due to the high orbit altitudes in which they reside, the effects of Westford Needle clusters on the space debris environment are of minor importance."
- The U-1, first German submarine built since the end of World War II, and the first for the West German Navy, was launched from the Kiel shipyard.
- The Pervomayskaya Moscow Metro station opened.
- Died:
  - John Peabody Harrington, 77, American linguist who gathered "the greatest collection of linguistic and ethnographic information about North American Indians ever compiled by one man."
  - Karl Korsch, 75, German Marxist theorist

== October 22, 1961 (Sunday) ==
- The Berlin Crisis began with a minor matter, as E. Allan Lightner, Jr., Deputy Chief of the U.S. Mission in West Berlin, and his wife, were stopped when he tried to drive his car across the border into East Berlin. Lightner refused to produce identification while crossing at Checkpoint Charlie, to attend the opera in East Berlin. General Lucius Clay dispatched troops, backed up by several tanks and military vehicles, to the Checkpoint. The Lightners were escorted into East Berlin by eight U.S. military policemen. Over the next three days, what started as a trivial incident escalated into a confrontation between the U.S. and the Soviet Union.
- Presidential and legislative elections were allowed to take place in Haiti by dictator François Duvalier, but only Duvalier supporters were allowed to run for office. Duvalier had his name printed on each ballot paper, with the result that he was re-elected unanimously.
- Chubby Checker performed his 1960 #1 hit, "The Twist" on The Ed Sullivan Show, reigniting the popularity of both the dance and the record. The song returned to the Top 100 three weeks later, and became the first and only hit single to reach #1 twice.
- The Mizo National Front was founded in India by Pu Laldenga, converting from a famine relief organization to a political party advocating secession of the Mizo people from India.
- Died: Joseph Schenck, 84, Russian-born film studio executive who served as president of United Artists and later Twentieth Century Pictures, forerunner of 20th Century Fox.

== October 23, 1961 (Monday) ==
- China's Prime Minister Zhou Enlai abruptly left Moscow, a week before the conclusion of the 22nd Communist Party Congress held in Moscow, four days after bitterly criticizing Soviet First Secretary Nikita Khrushchev over the issue of Albania. Zhou's departure was seen as a sign that the rift between the two Communist superpowers was widening, and the Soviets halted delivery of exports to China soon afterward.
- In a speech given in Bombay, India's Prime Minister Jawaharlal Nehru referred to increasing reports of "terror and torture" by the Portuguese authorities in Goa and declared that "the time has come for us to consider afresh what method should be adopted to free Goa from Portuguese rule."
- In New York, Thurgood Marshall, an African-American attorney who was the chief legal adviser to the NAACP, was sworn in as a federal judge on the U.S. Court of Appeals for the Second Circuit. He would become the first black U.S. Supreme Court justice in 1967.
- NASA presented Freedom 7, the first capsule to take an American astronaut into space, to the National Air Museum of the Smithsonian Institution. Alan Shepard had been launched in the capsule on the Mercury 3 space mission on May 5, 1961.
- Born: Laurie Halse Anderson, bestselling American young-adult novelist known for Speak; in Potsdam, New York

== October 24, 1961 (Tuesday) ==
- As part of an X-ray astronomy experiment, the first attempt was made to detect non-solar X-ray radiation in outer space, with the launch of a rocket from White Sands by astronomer Riccardo Giacconi. The launch was successful, but no data was returned in attempting to detect X-rays reflecting from the Moon. Analogous to a lens cap remaining on a camera, the doors that protected the data recording equipment failed to open. A second attempt on June 18, 1962, proved that the Moon did not reflect X-rays.
- A group of prominent campaigners for the preservation of the Euston Arch, including James Maude Richards, went to see British prime minister Harold Macmillan to argue for it to be dismantled and rebuilt elsewhere. Their arguments were unsuccessful, and the arch was demolished two months later.
- Construction work began on the Manic-2 dam over the Manicouagan River in Quebec, Canada.
- Malta gained a new constitution to support its independence.
- Born: Susan Still-Kilrain, American astronaut and shuttle pilot of two missions for Columbia; in Augusta, Georgia
- Died: Clem Stephenson, 71, English international footballer

== October 25, 1961 (Wednesday) ==
- The United Nations Security Council voted, 9–0, to admit Mongolia as a member of the UN, and 9–1 in favor of admitting Mauritania. The General Assembly approved the admission two days later.
- NASA Headquarters officially approved the Project Mercury extended range or one-day mission program.
- Libya became an exporter of oil with the opening of its first oil terminal.
- Born:
  - Chad Smith, American musician and drummer of the rock band Red Hot Chili Peppers; in St. Paul, Minnesota
  - Richard Schaefer, Swiss-born banker and boxing promoter; in Bern

== October 26, 1961 (Thursday) ==
- General Cemal Gürsel, who had led the military junta that had ruled since 1960, was elected in a joint session of the National Assembly and the Senate as the fourth President of Turkey, as that nation made its transition to civilian rule.
- Grégoire Kayibanda, leader of the Hutu majority party, became President of Rwanda, which would be granted full independence on July 1, 1962. During his presidency, repression against the Tutsi minority would continue.
- The Crucible, an English-language opera written by Robert Ward and based on the 1952 play by Arthur Miller, was given its first performance. It would win the Pulitzer Prize for Music in 1962.
- On October 26 and 27, ship retrieval tests were conducted to establish procedures for recovery of a crewed Mercury spacecraft. No difficulties were encountered.
- Born:
  - Dylan McDermott, American television actor known for The Practice; in Waterbury, Connecticut
  - Uhuru Kenyatta, President of Kenya from 2013 to 2022; in Nairobi

== October 27, 1961 (Friday) ==
- The Berlin Crisis almost erupted into war. Five days after the initial standoff at the border between East and West Berlin, 33 Soviet tanks drove to the Brandenburg Gate to confront American tanks on the other side of the border. Ten of the tanks continued to Friedrichstraße, stopping 50 metres (160 ft) to 100 metres (330 ft) from the checkpoint on the Soviet side of the sector boundary. The standoff between the tanks of the two nations continued for 16 hours before both sides withdrew.
- The eight-team American Basketball League, founded by Harlem Globetrotters owner Abe Saperstein after he was refused an NBA franchise, played its first game, as the San Francisco Saints defeated the visiting Los Angeles Jets, 99–96. The ABL was the first to use the three-point field goal, with baskets shot from further away than 25 feet (7.6 m) worth 3 points instead of 2. The ABL would fold partway through its second season, on December 31, 1962. The first three-point goals were scored by Mike Farmer for the Saints, and George Yardley and Larry Friend for the Jets.
- At 10:06 a.m., the Saturn I rocket booster, essential for the Apollo missions to the Moon, was first tested. The 162-foot (49 m) high rocket lifted off from Cape Canaveral and reached an altitude of 85 miles (137 km), proving that the "clustered engine concept" (with 8 large rocket engines) could be successful.
- The Space Task Group (STG), directed by Robert R. Gilruth, finished its Project Development Plan for U.S. human spaceflight for the years 1963 to 1965, including the "Mark II" Mercury spacecraft that could carry two astronauts rather than a single astronaut. The Mark II program would soon be renamed "Project Gemini". The two-person capsule was to be designed by McDonnell Aircraft Corporation and to use Mercury program technology. General Dynamics would create the Atlas launch rocket and Martin-Marietta would modify the Titan II rocket. Lockheed Missiles and Space Company was to design the Agena target vehicle for the Mark II to dock. Project Gemini was forecast to start with an uncrewed flight as early as May 1963, with 12 Gemini flights altogether, each to be longer than the Mercury limit of 18 orbits. A goal of Gemini was to eventually achieve a space rendezvous, the docking of two Gemini vehicles in orbit. After the first launch, succeeding flights would take place at two-month intervals from July 1963 to March 1965. The first year's budget for FY1962 was estimated to be $530,000,000, and the staffing requirement was 177 people. The first Gemini launch would take place on April 8, 1964, and the first with astronauts on March 23, 1965.
- Mongolia and Mauritania were admitted as the 102nd and 103rd members, respectively, of the United Nations, doubling the original membership of 51.
- An armistice between separatist rebels and U.N. Peacekeeping forces began in Katanga, which had seceded from the Congo.
- Fahri Özdiilek became the acting Prime Minister of Turkey.

== October 28, 1961 (Saturday) ==
- American and Soviet tanks began a gradual withdrawal from stand-off positions either side of the border, bringing an end to the Berlin Crisis.
- The Scottish League Cup Final between Rangers F.C. and Heart of Midlothian F.C. ended in a 1–1 draw, necessitating a replay.
- Died: James Rogers, 86, Australian Victoria Cross recipient

== October 29, 1961 (Sunday) ==
- In the Greek legislative election, Konstantinos Karamanlis and his National Radical Union party won a third successive victory, capturing 176 sets of the 300 seats in the Vouli ton Ellinon (Parliament). The Centre Union Party and the Progressive Party combined for 100 seats under the leadership of George Papandreou, and the United Democratic Left won 24.
- NASA announced that a Mercury-Scout launch would be made to verify the readiness of the world-wide Mercury Tracking network to handle further orbital flights.
- The man-made Pomme de Terre Lake went into operation as a reservoir in Missouri.
- RBS Channel 7 (now DZBB-TV), the Philippines' fifth TV station, was launched.
- Born: Randy Jackson, American singer-songwriter, musician and dancer for The Jacksons; in Gary, Indiana

== October 30, 1961 (Monday) ==
- The Soviet Union detonated a 50-megaton yield hydrogen bomb known as Tsar Bomba over Novaya Zemlya, in the largest man-made explosion ever. Too large to be fit inside even the largest available warplane, the weapon was suspended from a Tupolev Tu-95 piloted by A.E. Durnovtsev, a Hero of the Soviet Union. A parachute slowed the bomb's descent so that the airplane could have time to climb away from the fireball, and at an altitude of four kilometers, was exploded at 8:33 a.m. GMT. Although the news drew protests around the world, the event was not reported in the Soviet press.
- Died:
  - Margherita Sarfatti, 81, Italian journalist and socialite, former mistress of Benito Mussolini
  - Luigi Einaudi, 87, 2nd President of Italy from 1948 to 1955

== October 31, 1961 (Tuesday) ==
- Shortly after 10:00 p.m. in Moscow, Joseph Stalin's body was removed from the Lenin Mausoleum and reburied outside the Kremlin as part of his successor's policy of de-Stalinization.
- Hurricane Hattie devastated Belize City in the British Honduras (now Belize) killing 307 people. After the hurricane, the capital was moved in 1970 to the inland city of Belmopan.
- The first population census of Indonesia was taken, and recorded as 97,018,829.
- Born:
  - Peter Jackson, New Zealand film director known for The Lord of the Rings and The Hobbit trilogies; in Pukerua Bay
  - Larry Mullen, Jr., Irish drummer for U2; in Artane, Dublin
- Died: Augustus John, 83, Welsh artist
