= November 1961 =

Month of 1961

<<	November 1961					>>
Su	Mo	Tu	We	Th	Fr	Sa
			1	2	3	4
5	6	7	8	9	10	11
12	13	14	15	16	17	18
19	20	21	22	23	24	25
26	27	28	29	30

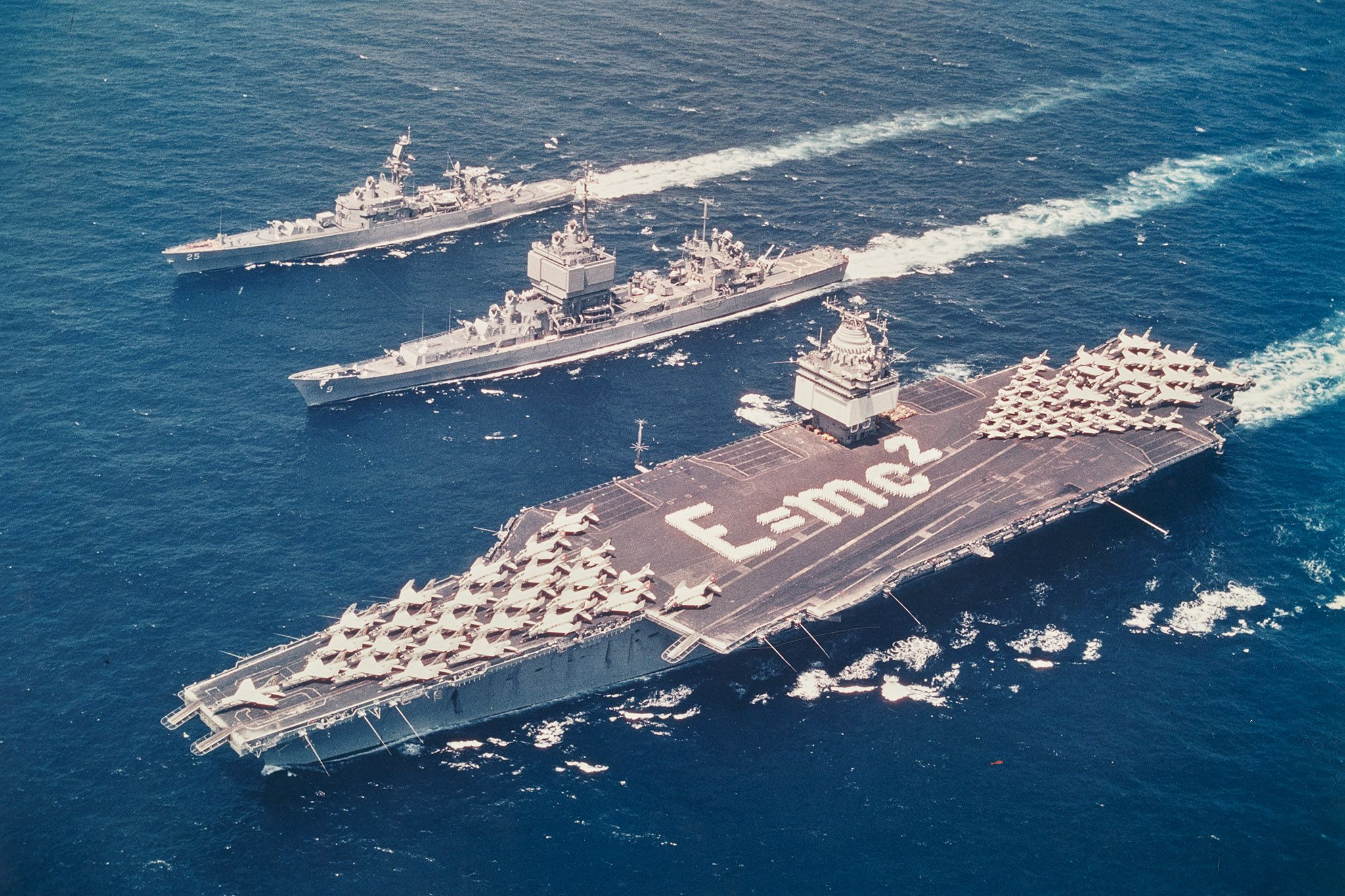
November 25, 1961: Nuclear-powered aircraft carrier USS Enterprise commissioned

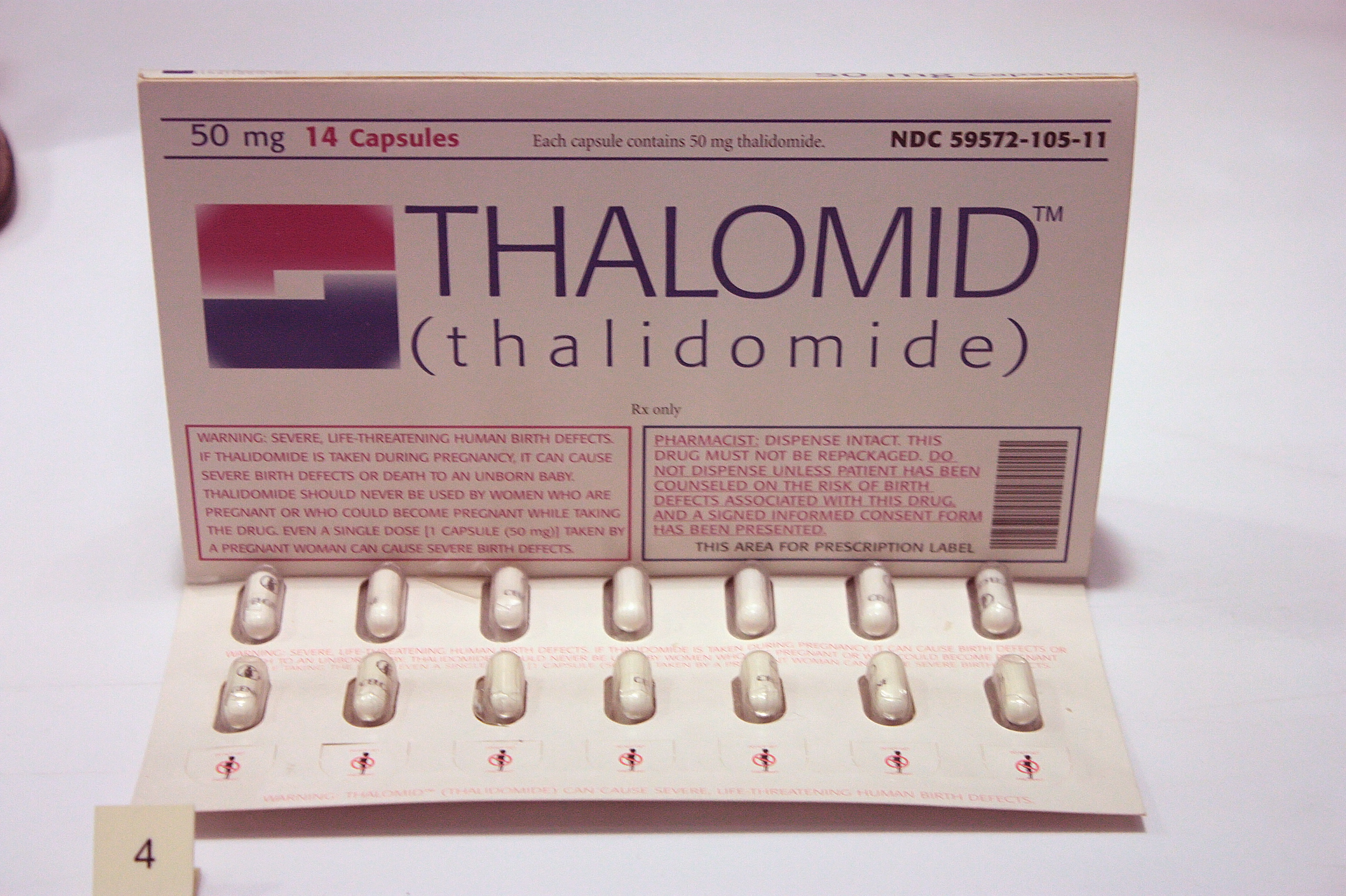
November 23, 1961: Thalidomide pulled from market after birth defect warning

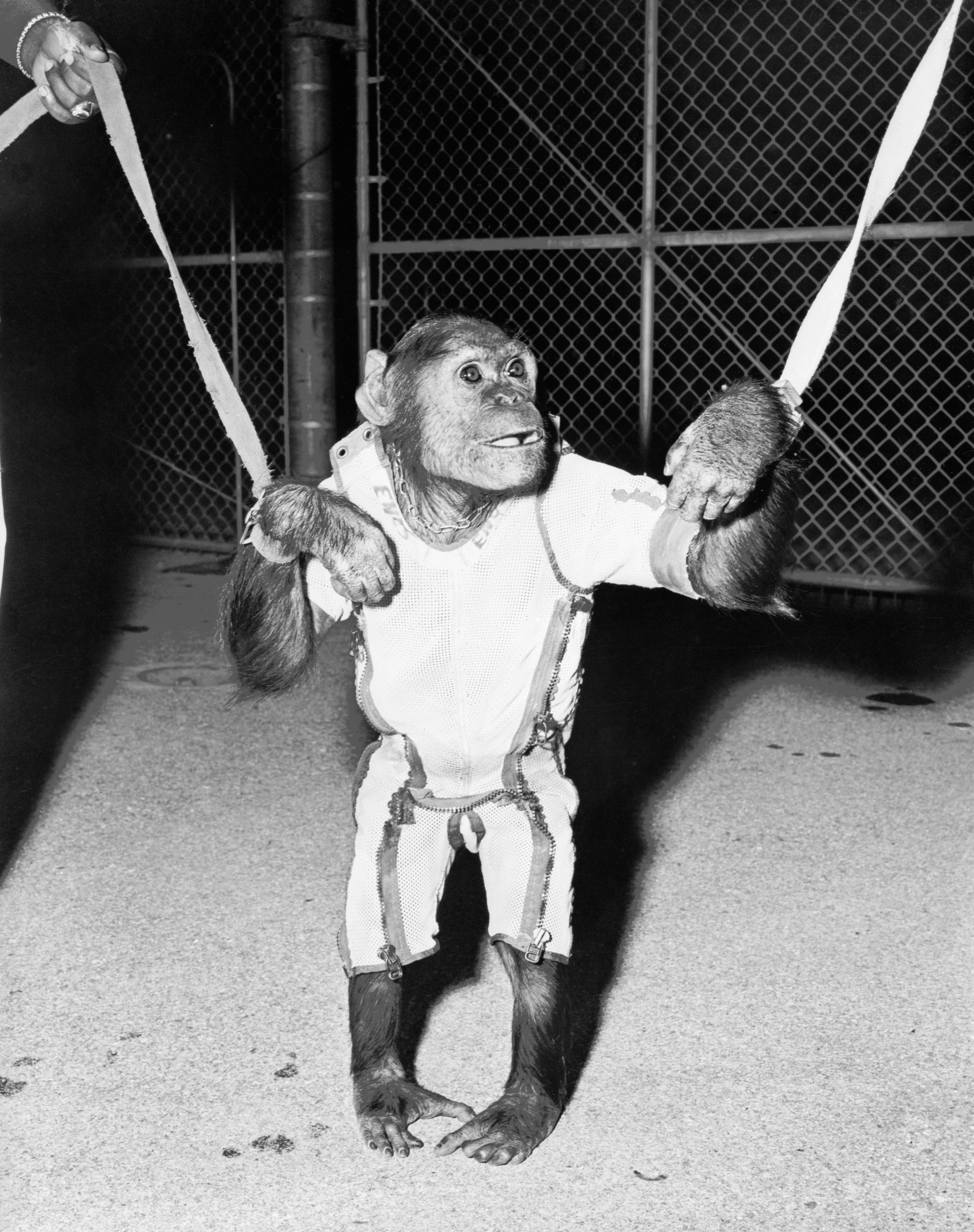
November 29, 1961: Enos the chimpanzee (pictured) becomes first American in orbit

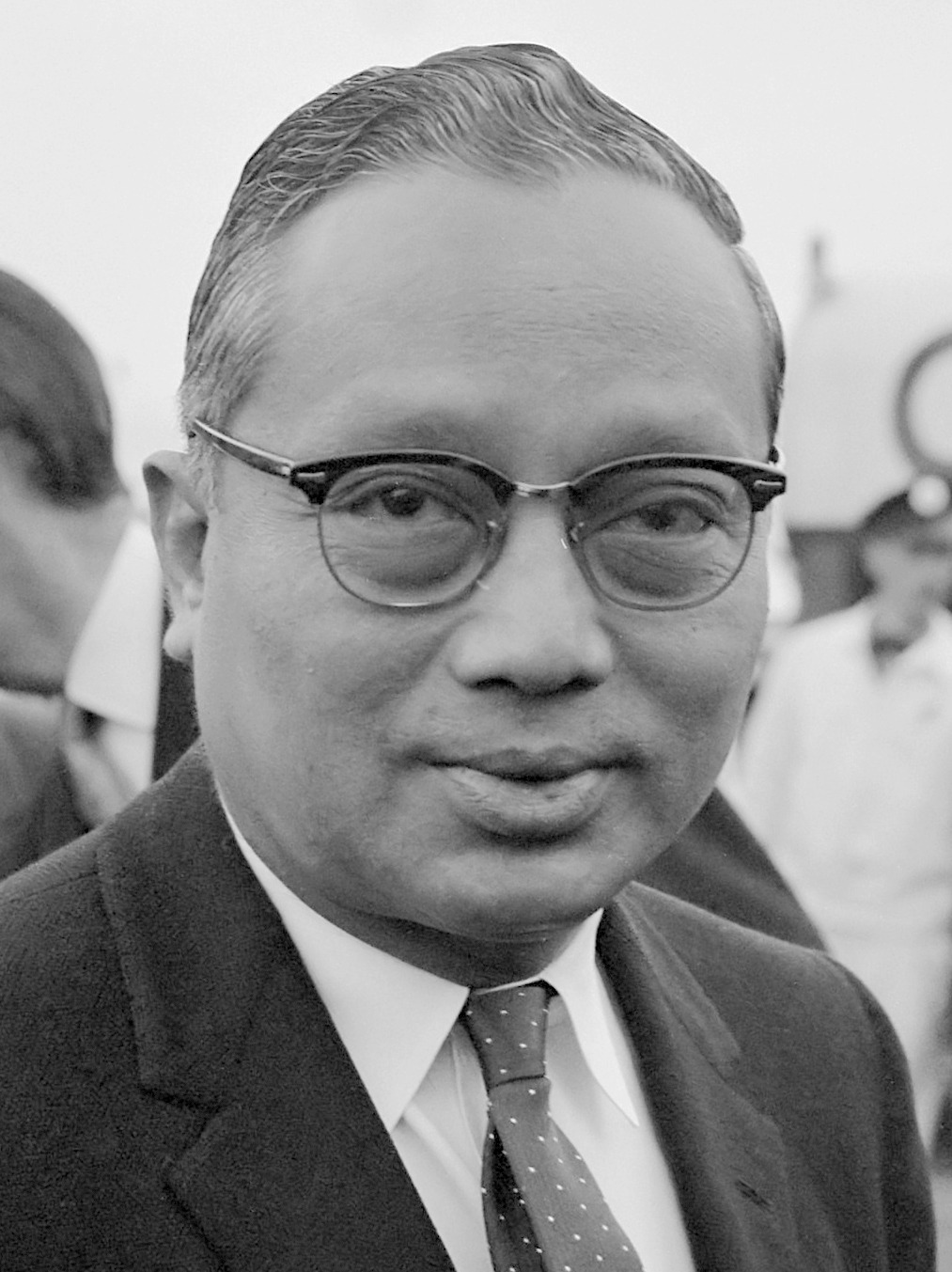
November 3, 1961: U Thant unanimously elected UN Secretary General

The following events occurred in November 1961:

== November 1, 1961 (Wednesday) ==
- The U.S. Interstate Commerce Commission's federal order, banning racial segregation at all interstate public facilities, went into effect.
- The first Soviet ICBM, called the R-16 in the USSR and the SS-7 by Americans, was put on active status.
- A Panair do Brasil Airlines DC-7 with 85 people on board crashed, killing 48 people. The plane, arriving from Lisbon in Portugal, was coming in for a landing at Recife when it struck a hillside in the Recife suburb of Tijipio.
- Women Strike for Peace, a women's peace activist group in the United States, held its first event, as thousands of American women, most of them housewives concerned over the contamination of strontium-90 from fallout, marched in 60 different U.S. cities to demand an end to further nuclear testing. Estimates of the number of participants ranged from 25,000 to 50,000.
- The U.S. attempted to launch a Mercury-Scout 1 rocket and its payload, a Manned Space Flight Network communications package, into orbit, in advance of the next crewed orbital flight, Mercury 4. However, 43 seconds after liftoff, the rocket veered off course and was remotely destroyed by the Range Safety Officer.
- NASA's Space Task Group (STG) was redesignated the Manned Spacecraft Center, with Robert R. Gilruth as Director. STG Director Robert R. Gilruth and Chief Engineer James A. Chamberlin briefed NASA Associate Administrator Robert C. Seamans, Jr. on the Mercury Mark II proposal and awaited NASA approval.
- The Hungry generation literary movement was launched in Calcutta, India, by the publication of the first manifesto by the so-called "Hungryalist quartet", consisting of Shakti Chattopadhyay, Malay Roy Choudhury, Samir Roychoudhury and Debi Roy.
- Born: Petr Pavel, 4th President of the Czech Republic since 2023; in Planá, Czechoslovakia

== November 2, 1961 (Thursday) ==
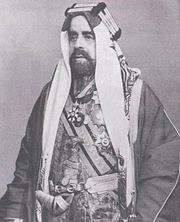
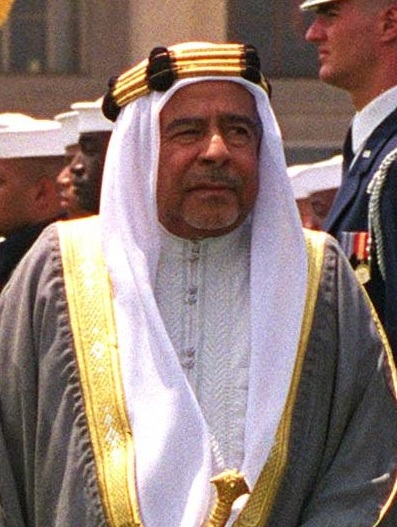
Salman bin Hamad and Emir Isa bin Salman
- Salman bin Hamad Al Khalifa, the Emir of Bahrain since 1942, died at the age of 67. At the time, the oil-rich Arab sheikdom was a protectorate of the United Kingdom. Salman's son, Isa bin Salman Al Khalifa, became the new Emir and would lead the nation to independence in 1971, reigning as King of Bahrain until his death in 1999.
- The cover of Oleg Penkovsky, who had passed along top secret Soviet information to American CIA agents operating in the USSR, was blown, after four KGB agents caught a CIA case officer in the act of picking up information that had been dropped off. The CIA man was expelled; the execution of Penkovsky would be announced on May 17, 1963.
- The musical Kean, based on the life of 18th-century Shakespearean actor Edmund Kean, opened at the Broadway Theater in New York City. It would close on January 20 after only 92 performances.
- Israel's Prime Minister David Ben-Gurion received approval to form a new coalition government, with the Knesset approving a vote of confidence, 63–46.
- Born: k.d. lang (stage name for Kathryn Dawn Lang), Canadian singer-songwriter; in Consort, Alberta
- Died:
  - Harriet Bosse, 83, Swedish-Norwegian actress
  - James Thurber, 66, American humorist

== November 3, 1961 (Friday) ==
- In one of the more unusual finishes in pro football history, the Dallas Texans were trailing the Boston Patriots, 28–21, but had made it down to the one-yard line with one second left. Patriots fans rushed onto the field, and even after being held back by police, one spectator ran into the end zone on the final play, thwarting a pass to the Texans' Chris Burford from Cotton Davidson, then disappeared back into the crowd.
- After returning from South Vietnam on a factfinding mission for President Kennedy, U.S. Army General Maxwell Taylor submitted a report proposing the commitment of 10,000 American combat troops to defend against the Communist Viet Cong. Kennedy eventually sent 25,000 troops to South Vietnam.
- The UN General Assembly unanimously (103–0) elected U Thant, the Ambassador from Burma (now Myanmar), as acting Secretary General, to replace the late Dag Hammarskjöld. The other candidate for the position had been General Assembly President Mongi Slim of Tunisia. Thant would serve for two terms, ending in 1971.
- U.S. Army Major General Edwin A. Walker resigned his commission, after having lost his command of a division in West Germany earlier in the year from controversial comments. Walker told reporters that "I must be free from the power of little men who, in the name of my country, punish loyal service to it."
- United Artists announced the selection of Scottish actor Sean Connery to portray James Bond in the upcoming film Dr. No. Patrick McGoohan had turned down the role, and Roger Moore (who would begin portraying Bond in 1973) was unavailable due to his commitments on the TV show The Saint.
- The White House Historical Association was created as a result of the efforts of U.S. First Lady Jackie Kennedy to fund the maintenance of the American presidential residence. Money was raised through the sales of the Association's book, The White House: An Historic Guide.
- The United States Agency for International Development (USAID) was established to coordinate American foreign aid.
- Born: David Armstrong-Jones, Viscount Linley, first child of Princess Margaret; at Clarence House, in London. At the time of his birth, he was fifth in line to the British throne, after his cousins Charles, Andrew, and Anne, and his mother.

== November 4, 1961 (Saturday) ==
- Italy's second television network Rai 2 began broadcasting, joining the original RAI (Radiotelevisione Italiana) which had begun in 1954.
- Born: Ralph Macchio, American film and television actor known for The Karate Kid; in Huntington, New York

== November 5, 1961 (Sunday) ==
- A fire killed 106 schoolchildren and four teachers at the Soviet city of Elbarusovo (roughly 15 miles southeast of Novocheboksarsk in the Chuvash ASSR; the disaster would not be acknowledged until 1994, with sculptor Vladimir Nagornov's creation of a monument that was erected on the site. The fire was also acknowledged in news coverage following a 2009 fire at a nightclub in Perm.

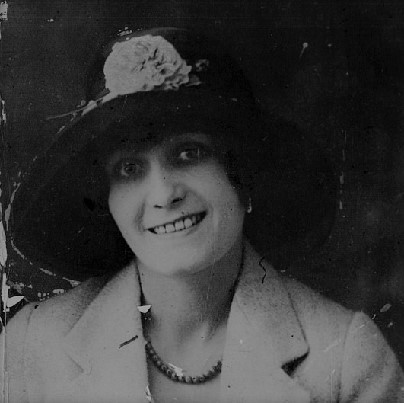
November 5, 1961: Mamie Stewart's body discovered after 42 years

- The remains of Welsh chorus girl Mamie Stuart, who had disappeared in 1919, were located 42 years after her death. Three amateur cave explorers had gone into an abandoned lead mine at Brandy Cove in Wales, and found a sack protruding from a stone slab. Looking for a possible treasure, the three discovered human bones from a body that had been sawed into three pieces. A coroner's inquest concluded that the remains were those of Stuart, whose husband George Shotton could not be charged with murder because her body could not be found.
- Tropical Storm Inga formed in the Gulf of Mexico, the first time a tropical storm has formed in the Gulf as late as November.
- Died: Channing H. Tobias, 79, chairman of the board of directors of the NAACP from 1953 to 1960

== November 6, 1961 (Monday) ==
- Heinz Felfe, West Germany's chief of counterintelligence for the Bundesnachrichtendienst (BND), was arrested by his own agents. Felfe, a former Nazi, was discovered to have been passing secrets of the American CIA to the Soviet Union and to East Germany since 1959, revealing the identify of more than 100 CIA agents in Moscow.
- The British freighter Cinn Keith exploded and sank in the Mediterranean Sea off of the coast of Tunisia, killing 62 of the 68 crewmen on board.
- American actor Michael J. Pollard (who would later win an Oscar for his performance in the film Bonnie and Clyde) married actress Beth Howland (best known for portraying the waitress "Vera" on the TV sitcom Alice).
- Born : Florent Pagny, French singer and actor

== November 7, 1961 (Tuesday) ==
- José María Velasco Ibarra was pressured into resigning as President of Ecuador. The Ecuadorian Army had the oath of office administered to Supreme Court President Camilo Gallegos Toledo. Ten minutes later, the Ecuadorian Congress voted to elevate Vice-president Carlos Arosemena (who had been jailed by the Army the day before) to the post.
- Konrad Adenauer was re-elected by the Bundestag for a fourth four-year term as Chancellor of West Germany, but by a margin of only 8 votes. With approval necessary from 250 of the 499 members, the vote was 258 to 206 in his favor, with 26 abstaining and 9 members absent.
- The Taiwanese cargo ship Union Reliance collided with the 9,003 GRT Norwegian tanker MS Berean in the Houston Ship Channel, catching fire and killing 12 people on the Berean.
- The most damaging blaze in Southern California history, up to that time, destroyed 48 homes in one of the wealthiest areas of the United States in the Hollywood Hills, including the houses of actors Burt Lancaster, Zsa Zsa Gabor, and Joe E. Brown.
- France secretly set off its first underground nuclear explosion, and its fifth overall since joining the nuclear club on February 13, 1960. Confirmation was not given until nearly three weeks later.
- Died:
  - Hugh Ruttledge, 77, English mountaineer who led two unsuccessful tries (in 1933 and 1936) at being the first to climb Mount Everest
  - Augustin Rösch, 68, German Jesuit and resistance fighter against Fascism
  - Mary Richardson, 72, Canadian suffragette and Fascist

== November 8, 1961 (Wednesday) ==
- The crash of Imperial Airlines Flight 201/8 killed 77 of the 79 people on board. The Lockheed L-049E Constellation, had been chartered to carry U.S. Army recruits from Baltimore, to basic training at Fort Jackson, South Carolina, crashed while attempting an emergency landing at Richmond, Virginia. The plane caught fire after coming down in a wooded ravine at 9:24 p.m. Subsequent investigation by the Civil Aeronautics Board determined that most of the people on board had survived the impact, but died of smoke inhalation after panicking in their rush toward the exits. The crew of the plane was blamed for allowing the fuel tank for one of the engines to empty, causing the stall; for failing to use an emergency valve to deploy a malfunctioning landing gear, which would have made an emergency landing possible at the airport; and for failing to instruct the passengers about what to do in the event of a crash. There was no attempt by the recruits to open any of the three emergency exits.
- U.S. Amateur golf champion Jack Nicklaus, a 21-year-old senior at Ohio State University announced at a press conference that he was turning professional. Nicklaus would go on to win 19 major championships, including six Masters tournaments and six PGA Championships.
- Born: Seán Haughey, Irish politician, Lord Mayor of Dublin from 1989 to 1990; in Raheny, County Dublin, as the son of future Taoiseach (prime minister) Charles Haughey and Maureen Haughey Lemass

== November 9, 1961 (Thursday) ==
- The Professional Golfers' Association of America (PGA) amended its constitution, ending a rule that had, since 1934, limited its membership to white people, and only those from the Western Hemisphere. Prior to the rescission of the "Caucasian clause", the PGA had allowed non-whites to play in the PGA Tour, though not to join, most notably Charlie Sifford, an African-American who earned $1,300 on the Tour in 1961.
- U.S. Air Force Captain Robert M. White set a new world record for speed in an airplane, becoming the first person to reach Mach 6. White flew an X-15 rocket plane to a speed of Mach 6.04, at 4,093 miles per hour (6,587 km/h).
- Brian Epstein saw the Beatles perform at the Cavern Club for the first time and signed them to a contract by December 10.
- Born:
  - Lisa McRee, American journalist and ABC television co-host of Good Morning America from 1997 to 1999; in Fort Worth, Texas
  - Jill Dando, British journalist and BBC television presenter, co-host of Crimewatch; in Weston-super-Mare, Somerset (murdered, 1999)

== November 10, 1961 (Friday) ==
- What would become the landmark U.S. Supreme Court case of Griswold v. Connecticut began nine days after Estelle Griswold of the Planned Parenthood League and Dr. C. Lee Buxton opened a clinic in New Haven, providing the means for birth control to patrons, in defiance of a Connecticut state law prohibiting the use of "any drug, medicinal article or instrument for the purpose of preventing conception". Ms. Griswold and Dr. Buxton were arrested and would take their challenge to the law all the way to the United States Supreme Court, which would rule in 1965 that laws that infringed upon marital privacy were unconstitutional.
- The Soviet city of Stalingrad, site of the Soviet defense of the Nazi invasion, was renamed Volgograd in honor of the Volga River, and in keeping with the Communist Party's reassessment of former leader Joseph Stalin. Two other cities named in honor of the dictator — Stalinsk in western Siberia, and Stalino in Ukraine — were renamed Novokuznetsk and Donetsk, respectively.
- The classic novel Catch-22, by Joseph Heller, was first put on sale by Simon & Schuster, after favorable advance reviews in October. The book's title, which became a phrase to refer to a no-win situation, had originally been Catch-18, but was changed because of a 1961 novel by Leon Uris, Mila 18.
- An Atlas missile, launched from the United States with a squirrel monkey on board, exploded 30 seconds after liftoff while being tested for a 5,000-mile (8,000 km) flight. The body of "Goliath", the 24-ounce (680 g) passenger, was found in the wreckage two days later.

== November 11, 1961 (Saturday) ==
- Thirteen members of the Italian Air Force, serving as part of the UN Peacekeeping Force in the Congo, were brutally murdered after arriving at the airport in Kindu. Five days after the airmen had disappeared, United Nations investigators discovered that the unarmed group had been kidnapped shortly after their cargo planes had landed with scout cars for a contingent of Malayan UN troops. Mutinying soldiers from the Congolese army, loyal to Vice-Premier Antoine Gizenga, seized the Italian men, beat them, and then shot them in front of the town's prison. Some of the bodies were dismembered and thrown into the Lualaba River.
- The Government of the 17th Dáil, with Seán Lemass continuing as Prime Minister, opened in Ireland.

== November 12, 1961 (Sunday) ==
- Retired USAF Captain Julian Harvey, operating the chartered yacht Bluebelle for the family of Wisconsin optometrist Dr. Arthur Duperrault, murdered the Dupperrault family by sinking the boat and escaping from it as it sank between the Bahamas and Florida. Rescuers found Harvey and the body of the youngest of the three Duperrault children, whom he had taken off the boat before it went down. Harvey thought he was the sole survivor of the seven persons on board, but four days later, the merchant ship Captain Theo spotted 11-year-old Terry Jo Duperrault, clinging to a cork raft. The next day, after learning that there was a survivor, Harvey checked into a Miami motel and killed himself. Investigators soon discovered that Harvey had taken out a $20,000 double-indemnity life insurance policy on his wife, and had almost gotten away with multiple murder.
- Born: Nadia Comăneci, Romanian gymnast who became the first person to win a perfect score of 10 in Olympic gymnastics; gold medalist in 1976 and 1980; in Oneşti

== November 13, 1961 (Monday) ==
- World-famous cellist Pablo Casals, who had fled his native Spain and vowed in 1938 not to perform in any nation that recognized the regime of Francisco Franco (including the United States), played the cello at the request of the president and Mrs. Kennedy. The occasion was a state dinner at the White House in honor of Puerto Rico's governor Luis Muñoz Marín. Casals, 84, had last performed at the White House 57 years earlier, for President Theodore Roosevelt on January 15, 1904.
- Ten days after pressure blew the cap from a natural gas well in the Sahara Desert in Algeria, the "world's biggest fire" started, sending flames 600 feet (180 m) high. Firefighting expert Red Adair would extinguish the blaze on April 29, 1962, with 660 pounds (300 kg) of dynamite.
- During heavy storms, the Norwegian fishing vessel Peder Vinje disappeared off Norway's north cape, with 13 men on board, while the Danish motorship Teddy sank in the Baltic Sea on the same evening, taking with it 12 of its 16 men.
- Vladimir Semichastny succeeded Alexander Shelepin as head of the KGB. Semichastny would be replaced on May 18, 1967, by future Soviet head of state Yuri Andropov.
- The airline MADAIR (later Air Madagascar) was created.
- Born: Kim Polese, American inventor and computer entrepreneur; in Berkeley, California
- Died: Herman Smitt Ingebretsen, 70, Norwegian politician who had led the Conservative Party, and was later imprisoned in a Nazi concentration camp from 1943 to 1945.

== November 14, 1961 (Tuesday) ==
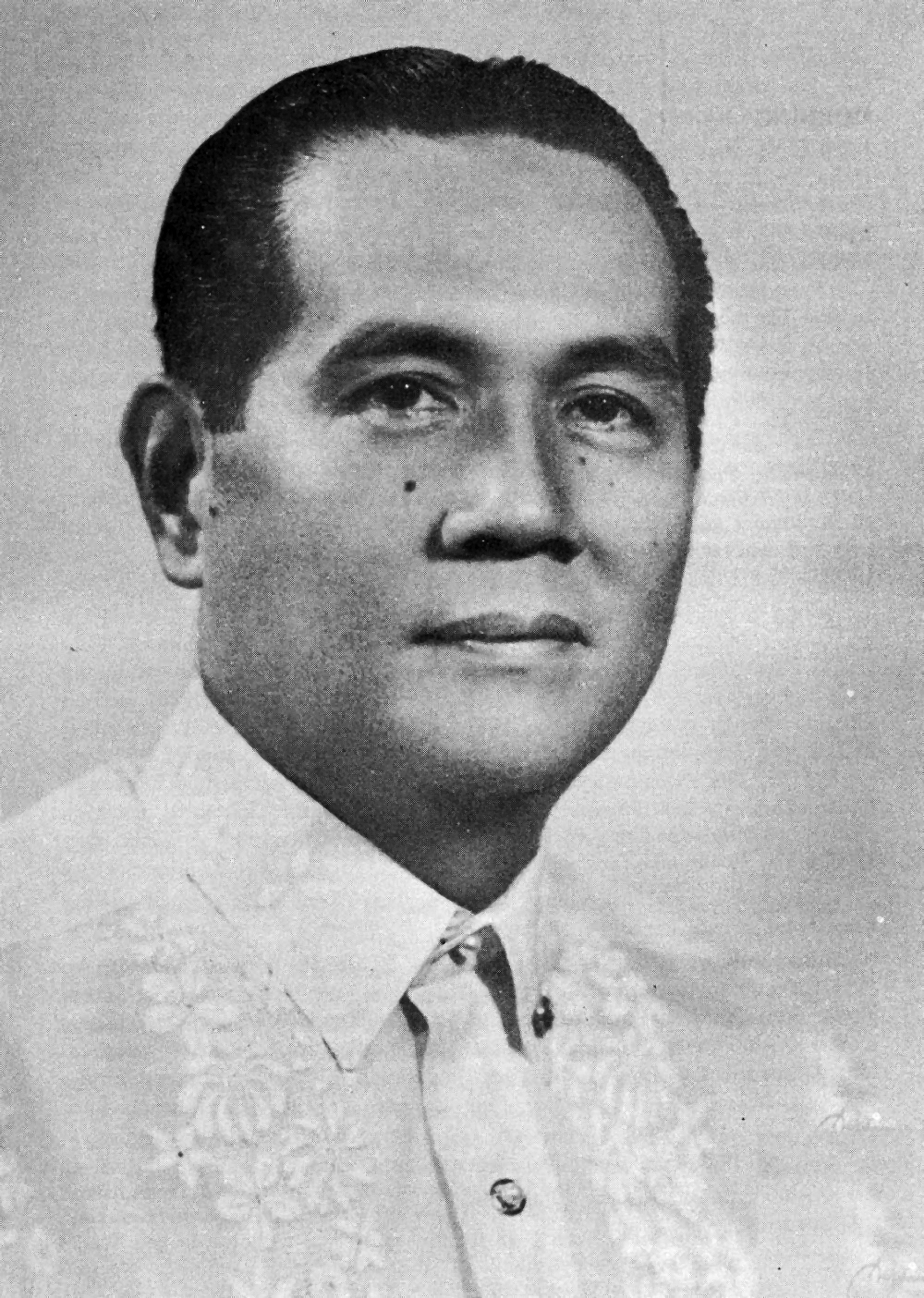
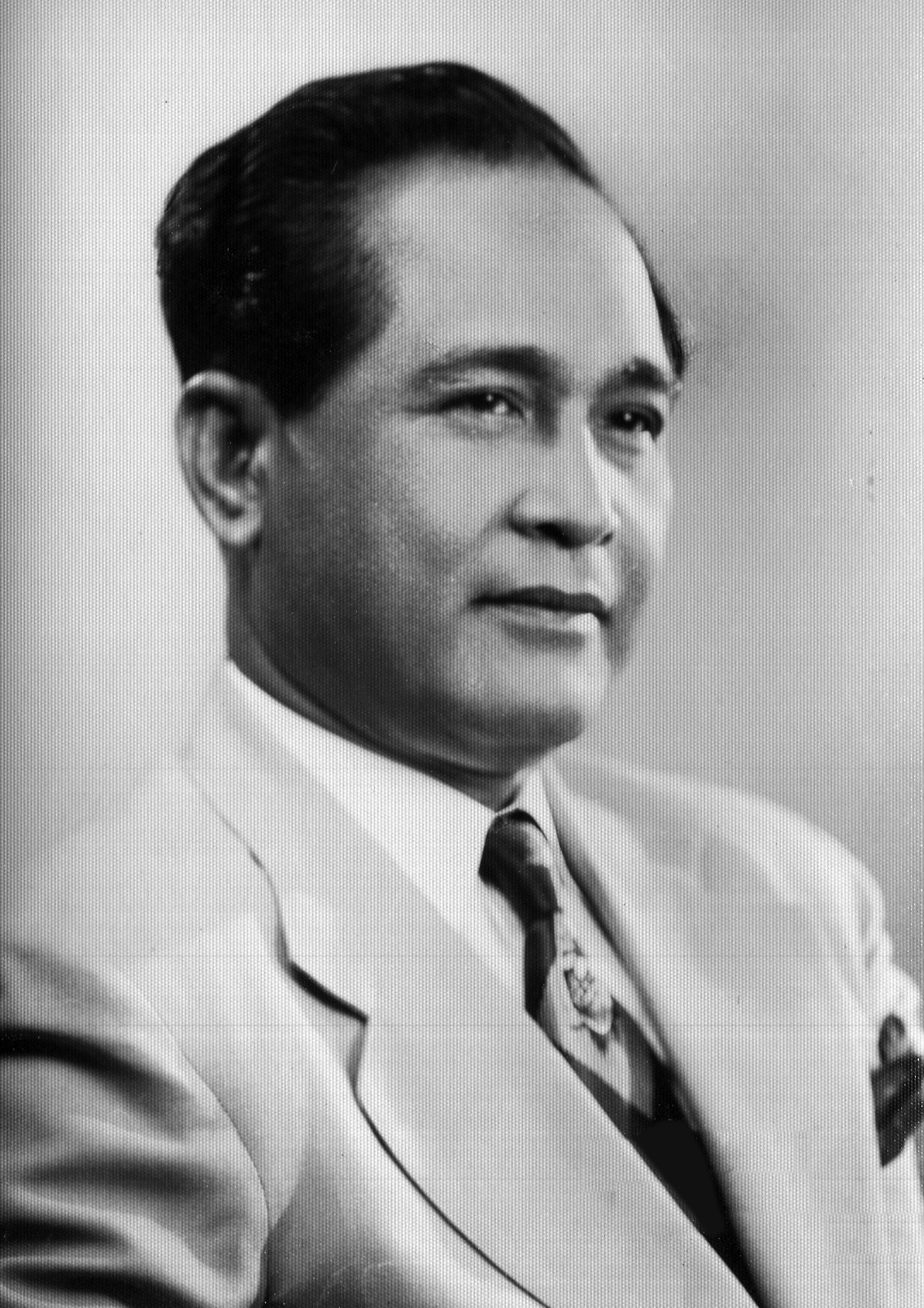
VP Macapagal beats President Garcia
- In the Philippine presidential election, incumbent president Carlos P. Garcia was defeated in a re-election bid by his vice-president, Diosdado Macapagal. Macapagal won 55% of the vote, with 3,554,840 ballots in his favor, compared to 2,902,966 for Garcia.
- The crash of a DC-4 cargo plane on its final approach to Greater Cincinnati Airport left the three crew of Zantop Air Transport with only minor injuries, but was the first of three blamed partly on the poor positioning of one of the airport's runways. Two later crashes during the approach to Runway 18, which was about two miles (3.3 km) from a tree-covered hill, would kill more than 120 people, with 58 dying in the 1965 crash of American Airlines Flight 383. After 70 more were killed when TWA Flight 128 struck trees during its approach to the same runway, high intensity lights would be installed on the hillside along with glide-slope equipment beacons on recommendation of the National Transportation Safety Board.
- The Shah of Iran gave Iranian Prime Minister Ali Amini the go-ahead to begin the "White Revolution", a comprehensive series of reforms aimed at improving education, combating poverty, and eliminating corruption over a period of ten years.
- A resolution to expel South Africa from the United Nations General Assembly failed to receive the required two-thirds majority. The vote of a committee of representatives from the 103 member nations was 47–32 in favor, and 34 abstaining.
- Born:
  - Antonio Flores, Spanish singer-songwriter, son of entertainer Lola Flores (committed suicide, 1995); in Madrid
  - Jurga Ivanauskaitė, Lithuanian writer (d. 2007); in Vilnius

== November 15, 1961 (Wednesday) ==
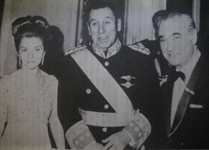
Mr. and Mrs. Peron (center and left)

- Maria Estela Martinez Cartas, who had been a nightclub dancer in Argentina using the stage name "Isabel", married former Argentine President Juan Perón in Madrid, where he had lived in exile since his overthrow in 1955. In 1973, Perón would return from exile and be elected president, with Isabel as his vice-president. Upon Juan Perón's death the following year, Isabel Perón would become the first woman to ever serve as president of any nation.
- McDonnell Aircraft Corporation delivered its detail specification of the two-man Mercury Mark II spacecraft to the Manned Spacecraft Center, adapting the design of the one-man Mercury spacecraft. Innovations included bipropellant thrusters to effect orbital maneuvers, crew ejection seats for emergency use, an improved onboard navigation system, and fuel cells to supplement the electrical power of silver-zinc batteries and to permit a longer-duration mission of as much as seven days.
- Kuwait Television began broadcasting. For the first twelve years, the station in Kuwaiti City showed programming, in black and white, for four hours per day. Color television would be inaugurated on March 16, 1974.
- Mercury spacecraft No. 18, which would be used by Scott Carpenter on May 24, 1962, for the fourth crewed Mercury mission, Mercury 7, was delivered to Cape Canaveral.
- Rembrandt's Aristotle Contemplating a Bust of Homer, was sold to the Metropolitan Museum of Art for $2.3 million, becoming the most expensive painting in the world.
- Born: Hugh McGahan, New Zealand rugby league player; in Auckland
- Died:
  - Artemio de Valle Arizpe, 73, Mexican historical fiction author
  - Elsie Ferguson, 78, American actress and silent film star

== November 16, 1961 (Thursday) ==
- Dr. John Lykoudis, of Missolonghi in Greece, received a patent for the antibiotic medicine he had devised to effectively treat peptic ulcer disease, thought at the time to be caused by excessive stomach acid rather than by bacteria. However, he was rebuffed by the Greek government in attempting to obtain trials and approval of the medication, which he called Elgaco, and by medical journals. In 1983, three years after Lykoudis died, Drs. Barry Marshall and Robin Warren would confirm that ulcers were indeed caused by a bacterium, Helicobacter pylori, which thrived in acidic environments.
- The United States increased its involvement in Vietnam, beginning its first tactical airlift operations as part of "Operation Farm Gate". Four C-47 Skytrain transports began operation from Bien Hoa Air Base.
- The annual USSR Chess Championship, eventually won by Boris Spassky (who would later become World Champion), began in Baku.
- Born: Müjdat Yetkiner, Turkish footballer for Fenerbahçe S.K. and for the Turkey national team; in Istanbul

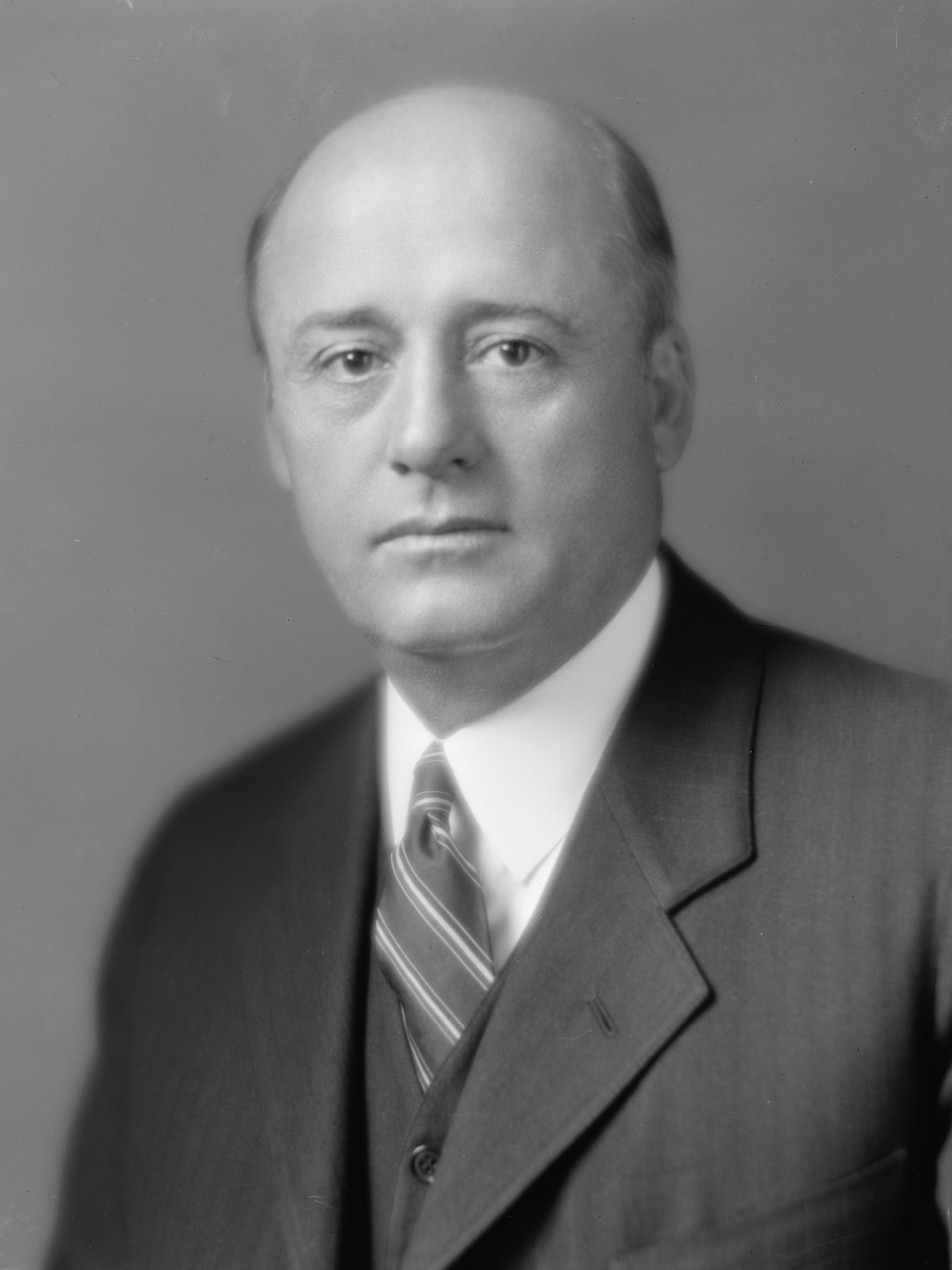
Rayburn

- Died: Sam Rayburn, 79, 43rd Speaker of the United States House of Representatives since 1955 and from 1940 to 1947 and 1949 to 1953) and U.S. Congressman for the 4th District of Texas since 1913, died of pancreatic cancer.

== November 17, 1961 (Friday) ==
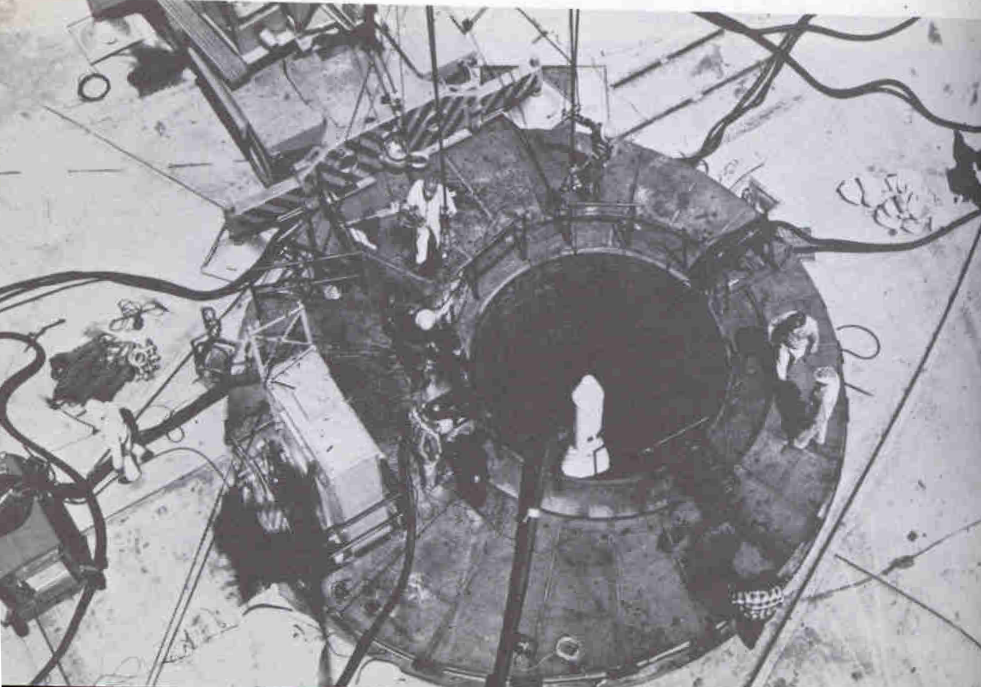
A Minuteman-I in its silo

- The United States achieved the first successful launch from an underground missile silo, sending up a Minuteman-I missile from Cape Canaveral, Florida.
- Portuguese troops at the colony of Goa fired, without provocation, on the passenger ship Sabarmati near Anjadip Island, killing one person and injuring another. By the end of the month, the government of India would make the decision to drive the Portuguese out, culminating in the 1961 Indian Annexation of Goa.
- Born: Robert Stethem, U.S. Navy Seabee diver; in Waterbury, Connecticut (killed during the hijacking of TWA Flight 847, 1985)
- Died: Benny Kauff, 71, American baseball player who starred in the Federal League (1914–1915). After playing in the National League from 1916 to 1920, in 1921, he was banned for life from baseball after being arrested on a charge of auto theft, even though he was later acquitted.

== November 18, 1961 (Saturday) ==
- West German pediatrician Widukind Lenz of Hamburg delivered his findings at a meeting of the German Pediatric Society, making the link between the morning sickness pill thalidomide and phocomelia, a birth defect causing missing limbs. Dr. Lenz found that in 17 out of 20 cases of defects that he had investigated in Hamburg, the mothers had used the medicine, marketed there under the name Contergan. By contrast, there had been only one case of phocomelia out of 210,000 births in Hamburg between 1930 and 1955. A reporter at the meeting broke the story the next day in the German national Sunday paper Welt am Sonntag.
- Eddie Arcaro, who had more wins in U.S. Classics than any other jockey, finished third in what would prove to be his final horse race, showing with Endymion in the Pimlico Futurity at Aqueduct Racetrack in New York City. Arcaro retired before the 1962 racing season, having ridden 24,092 races and winning 4,779 of them, as well as 807 second place and 3,302 third-place finishes. Finishing first in the race was Willie Shoemaker, who would later hold the records.
- Barry Goldwater, U.S. Senator from Arizona, spoke out in Atlanta against President Kennedy and big government. Although he was a member of the NAACP, the man who would become the Republican nominee for president in 1964, said that states, rather than Washington, should enforce school desegregation, offering "I wouldn't like to see my party assume it is the role of the federal government to enforce integration of schools."
- The funeral of longtime House Speaker Sam Rayburn was held in Bonham, Texas. Two former American Presidents (Truman, Eisenhower) and one future one (Lyndon B. Johnson) joined President Kennedy sitting together at the services in the small northeast Texas town.
- Born: Anthony Warlow, Australian opera singer; in Wollongong

== November 19, 1961 (Sunday) ==
- The "Rebellion of the Pilots" (La Rebelión de los Pilotos), an uprising by six Dominican Republic Air Force officers against the remaining members of the family of the late Rafael Trujillo, forced the resignation of General Rafael "Ramfis" Trujillo, Jr., who had continued the Trujillo rule of the Caribbean nation in the months after the assassination of his father.
- Michael Rockefeller, son of New York Governor, and later Vice President Nelson Rockefeller, disappeared off the coast of New Guinea. His body was never found and a court in White Plains, New York, would officially declare him dead on January 31, 1964. The younger Rockefeller left an estate worth $660,000.
- Factory roll-out inspection of Atlas launch vehicle 109-D was conducted. This booster was designated for the Mercury-Atlas 6 (MA-6) mission, the United States' first crewed orbital space flight.
- Born:
  - Meg Ryan (stage name for Margaret Hyra), American film actress; as in Fairfield, Connecticut
  - Crystal Waters, American house and dance music singer; in Deptford Township, New Jersey

== November 20, 1961 (Monday) ==
- İsmet İnönü became the Prime Minister of Turkey, heading a government for the first time since 1950, when he had last served as President. İnönü had formed a coalition government with ministers from his own Republican People's Party and the Justice Party).
- The last 27 members of the Trujillo family departed the Dominican Republic, where the relatives of the late Rafael Trujillo had ruled for 30 years. Rafael had been assassinated on May 30. Three of his brothers (including former president Héctor Trujillo) joined Rafael, Jr., who had left the previous day. The group departed on a chartered Pan American DC-6 to Miami from the soon to be renamed Dominican capital, Ciudad Trujillo.
- Manned Spacecraft Center directed North American Aviation to proceed with Phase II-A of the Paraglider Development Program, an eight-month effort to develop the design concept of a paraglider landing system and to determine its optimal performance configuration., after a NASA working group had reviewed the problems posed by an orbital rendezvous, essential for future missions, and concluded that "a vigorous high priority rendezvous development effort must be undertaken immediately."

== November 21, 1961 (Tuesday) ==
- The first revolving restaurant in the United States, "La Ronde", opened on the 23rd floor of the Ala Moana Building on 1441 Kapiolani Boulevard in Honolulu.

== November 22, 1961 (Wednesday) ==
- Robert Bolt's play A Man for All Seasons, already a success in the UK, opened at the ANTA Playhouse on Broadway, starring Paul Scofield as Thomas More.
- Born:
  - Mariel Hemingway, American film and actress, known for Lipstick (1976), Manhattan (1979) and Personal Best (1982); in Mill Valley, California
  - Stephen Hough, British-born Australian pianist; in Heswall, Cheshire
- Died: Anselmo Alliegro y Milá, 61, acting President of Cuba for two days after the January 1, 1959 departure of dictator Fulgencio Batista prior to the arrival of Fidel Castro's troops.

== November 23, 1961 (Thursday) ==
- Thalidomide was withdrawn from sale in West Germany, five days after Dr. Widukind Lenz told a medical conference about the deformities that it caused. According to a report six years later, pharmaceuticals in other nations withdrew the drug from the market "and within nine months the wave of malformations subsided", but that "estimates of the world-wide number of crippled babies run up to 6,500, the figures compiled a few years ago by an international parents association."
- At the request of Dominican Republic President Joaquín Balaguer, the name of the capital was changed from Ciudad Trujillo after 35 years, by unanimous approval from the Dominican Congress. The city reverted to its former name of Santo Domingo.
- Andy Warhol wrote gallerist Muriel Latow a check for $50, thought to have been payment for coming up with the idea of soup cans as subject matter for his art.
- Aerolíneas Argentinas Flight 322 exploded shortly after takeoff from São Paulo, Brazil, killing all 40 passengers and the crew of 12.
- Born: Merv Hughes, Australian cricketer, national team bowler from 1985 to 1994; in Euroa, Victoria
- Died: Princess Elisabeth of Waldeck and Pyrmont, 89, member of German royalty before 1918

== November 24, 1961 (Friday) ==
- The United Nations General Assembly approved Resolution 1653 (XVI), the "Declaration on the Prohibition of the Use of Nuclear and Thermonuclear Weapons", by a 2/3rds majority (55–20, with 26 abstentions).
- Born: Arundhati Roy, Indian writer; in Shillong, state of Assam (now the state of Meghalaya)
- Died: Axel Wenner-Gren, 80, Swedish inventor of the portable vacuum cleaner, later an entrepreneur who owned the Electrolux Group

== November 25, 1961 (Saturday) ==
- Lieutenant Hugh B. Haskell, U.S. Navy, and his co-pilot made a pioneer flight from Byrd Station in Antarctica to establish Sky-High Camp (later Eights Station) at 75°14'S, 77°06'W.
- The Soviet Union first opened dialogue with Vatican City as Nikita Khrushchev sent congratulations to Pope John XXIII on the latter's 80th birthday.
- The USS Enterprise, the world's first nuclear-powered aircraft carrier, was commissioned.
- The Roman Catholic dioceses of Malolos and Imus were created in the Philippines.
- Died: Dénes Györgyi, 75, Hungarian architect

== November 26, 1961 (Sunday) ==
- West German pharmaceutical manufacturer Grünenthal GmbH became the first company to take thalidomide off of the market, nine days after the first report of its link to birth defects was published. The Distillers Company removed the drug from British distribution on December 21.
- In the Avellaneda derby soccer match between Club Atlético Independiente and Racing Club de Avellaneda, the referee was forced to suspend play for six minutes due to fighting amongst the players. Four players from each team were sent off. The game ended in a 1–1 draw.
- Died: Styles Bridges, 63, U.S. Senator for New Hampshire for almost 25 years, and former President pro tempore of the United States Senate

== November 27, 1961 (Monday) ==
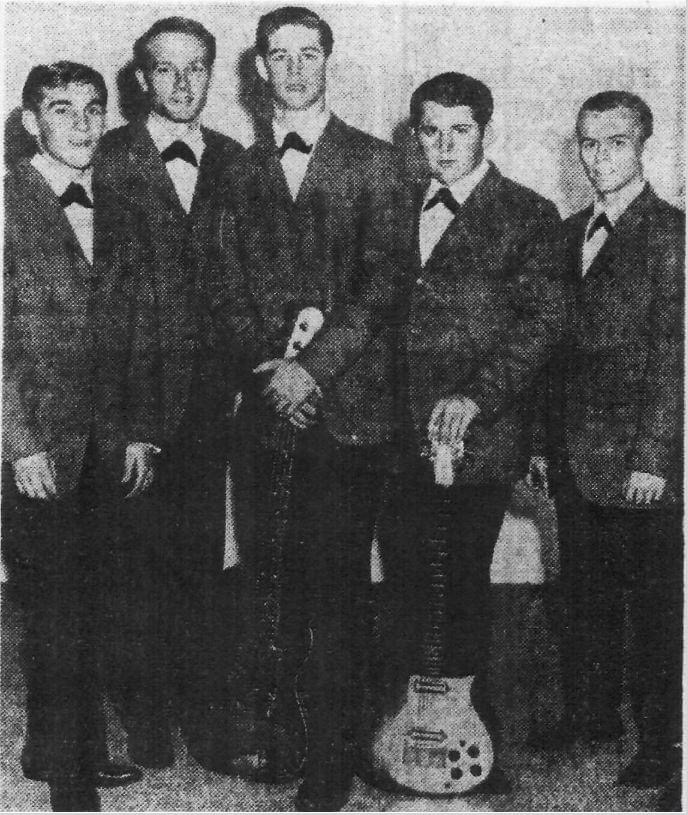
November 27, 1961: The Beach Boys release their first single

- U.S. brothers Brian, Dennis and Carl Wilson; their cousin Mike Love; and their friend Al Jardine, who had created a band called the Pendletones, saw the release of their first single, "Surfin'"/"Luau". Record distributor Russ Regan renamed the band to the Beach Boys for its release, and "Surfin'" peaked at #75 on the Billboard Hot 100 chart.
- Four days after the #2 Ohio State Buckeyes American football team had closed its season unbeaten, with a record of 8 wins and one tie and the championship of the Big Ten Conference, the faculty council at Ohio State University voted 28–25 to reverse the OSU Athletic Council's 6–4 decision to accept an invitation to the Rose Bowl. Objections to the post-season game, and a chance at the mythical national championship, were that OSU's academic prestige had been hurt by its image as "a football school".

== November 28, 1961 (Tuesday) ==
- After Morocco's King Hassan II agreed to allow the Arab nation's Jewish minority to leave, the first group of 105 Jews was allowed to fly out to Israel. By the end of the year, 11,478 had left, and over the next two years, the 85,000 members of the community had emigrated.
- U.S. President Kennedy dedicated the new CIA headquarters building in Langley, Virginia. Kennedy praised outgoing Director Allen W. Dulles, saying, "Your successes are unheralded; your failures are trumpeted." John A. McCone would succeed Dulles the next day.
- Nuclear test ban talks resumed in Geneva between the United States, the United Kingdom, and the USSR. Thirteen meetings would be held over the next two months.
- Representatives of the Space and Information Systems Division of North American, Langley Research Center, Flight Research Center (formerly High Speed Flight Station), and the Manned Spacecraft Center agreed that paraglider research and development would be oriented to the Mercury Mark II project.
- Born:
  - Tom Homan, American immigration official and political commentator, in West Carthage, New York**Florian Vijent, Dutch-Surinamese football goalkeeper; in Amsterdam (killed in airplane crash, 1989)

== November 29, 1961 (Wednesday) ==
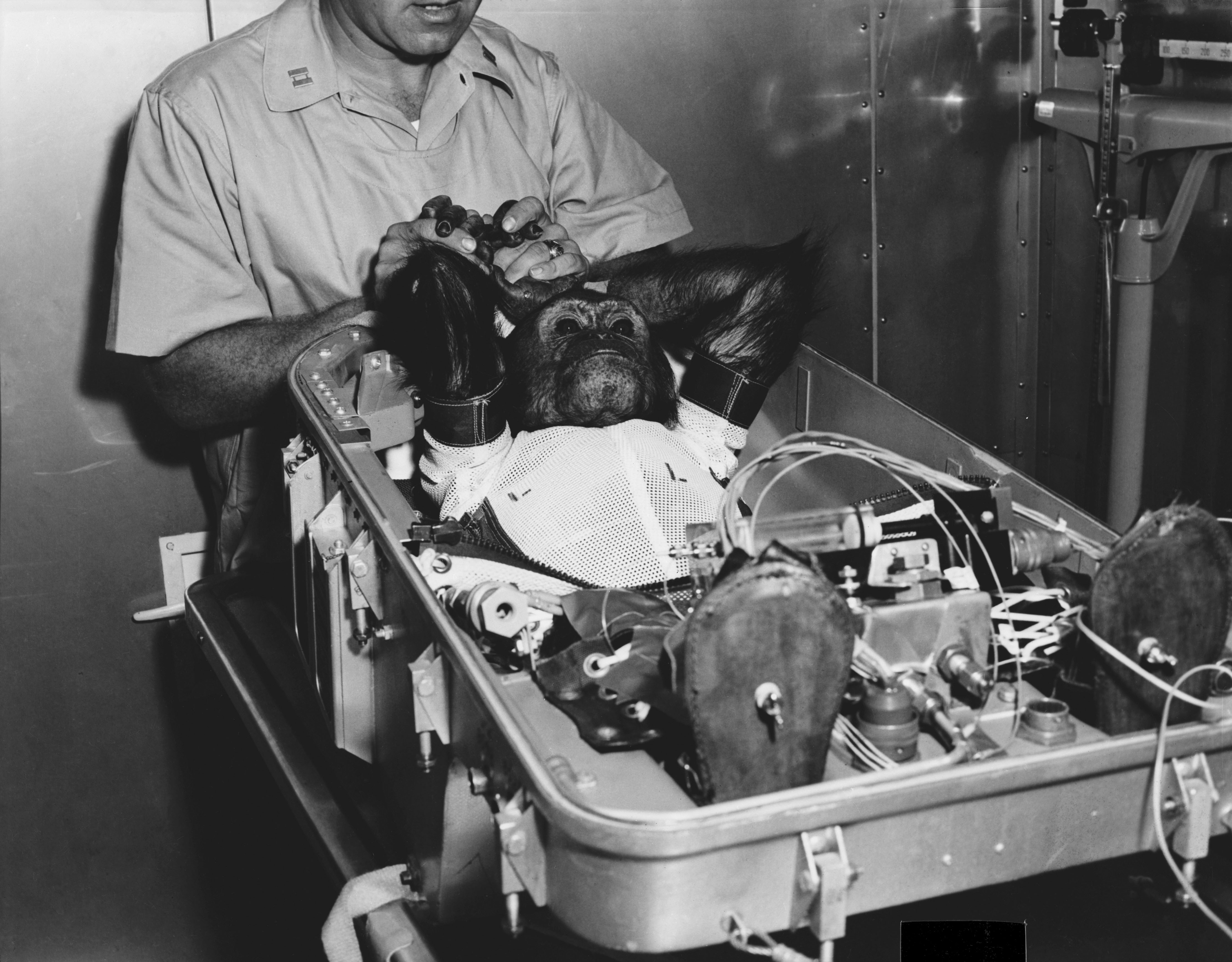
Enos before the flight

- The United States successfully placed a 37.5-pound (17.0 kg) chimpanzee, Enos, into orbit around the Earth, clearing the way for the first American astronaut to break the pull of Earth's gravity. Enos lifted off from Cape Canaveral on board Mercury-Atlas 5 at 9:07 a.m. for the second and final orbital qualification of the spacecraft prior to crewed flight. Scheduled for three orbits, the spacecraft was returned to earth after two orbits due to the failure of a roll reaction jet and to the overheating of an inverter in the electrical system. Both of these difficulties could have been corrected had an astronaut been aboard. Enos was recovered safely at 12:28 p.m. in the Atlantic Ocean, 255 miles (410 km) southeast of Bermuda, by the USS Stormes. During the flight, the chimpanzee performed psychomotor duties and upon recovery was found to be in excellent physical condition. The flight was termed highly successful and the Mercury spacecraft well qualified to support crewed orbital flight. John Glenn was selected as the pilot for the first crewed orbital flight, although Donald "Deke" Slayton had been announced as the second choice after Glenn. Scott Carpenter was chosen as the backup if Glenn was unable to fly. The remaining astronauts concentrated their efforts on various engineering and operational groups of the Manned Spacecraft Center in preparation for the mission.
- New York City's iconic Carnegie Hall hosted country music's legendary Grand Ole Opry for the first time in the history of either organization, in a benefit concert for the Musicians Aid Society. A sellout crowd of 2,700 New Yorkers came out to see Patsy Cline, Grandpa Jones, Minnie Pearl, Jim Reeves, Bill Monroe, Faron Young, Marty Robbins and The Jordanaires. Prior to the concert, theater critic and columnist Dorothy Kilgallen wrote in her syndicated gossip column, "Remember when Carnegie Hall was associated with MUSIC?"
- The UK government published a white paper accepting most of the recommendations of the Royal Commission on Local Government in Greater London.
- Born: Gilberto Román, Mexican boxer, world super flyweight champion from 1986 to 1987; in Mexicali (died in automobile accident, 1990)

== November 30, 1961 (Thursday) ==
- U.S. President Kennedy authorized Operation Mongoose, the secret funding of Cuban groups to overthrow Cuba's new revolutionary socialist government led by prime minister Fidel Castro. Brigadier General Edward Lansdale was put in command of the project, which had 4,000 operatives on its payroll between 1961 and 1963.
- In the UN Security Council, the Soviet Union vetoed Kuwait's application for United Nations membership, in alliance with Iraq. After the Arab League withdrew its forces from the sheikdom, the Security Council, including the USSR, approved Kuwait's membership.
- All 15 people on Ansett-ANA Flight 325 were killed when the Vickers Viscount Type 720 turboprop broke up in mid-air turbulence and crashed into Botany Bay, shortly after taking off from Sydney on a flight to Canberra.
- Atlas launch vehicle 109-D for the Mercury 6 mission of February 20, 1962, which would make John Glenn the first U.S. astronaut to orbit the Earth, was delivered to Cape Canaveral.
- Died: Winifred Lawson, 69, English opera and concert soprano
