= Mercury-Scout 1 =

United States spacecraft

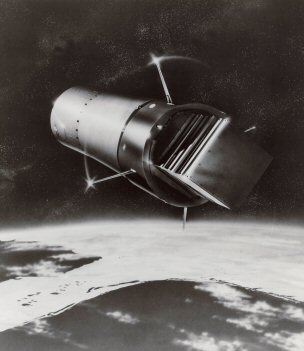
- Mission type: Tracking test
- Operator: NASA
- Mission duration: Failed to orbit

Spacecraft properties
- Launch mass: 67.5 kilograms (149 lb)

Start of mission
- Launch date: November 1, 1961, 15:32 UTC
- Rocket: Blue Scout II D-8
- Launch site: Cape Canaveral LC-18B

Orbital parameters
- Reference system: Geocentric
- Regime: Low Earth
- Epoch: Planned
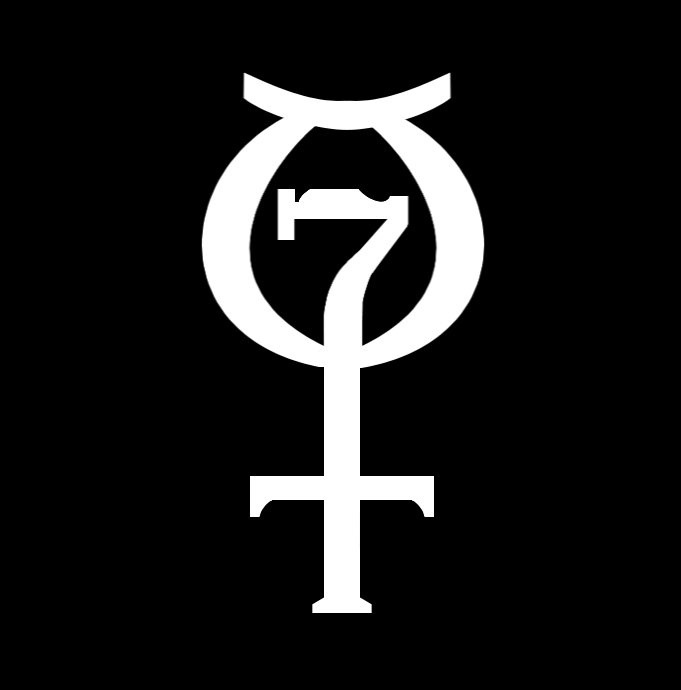

Mercury-Scout 1, or MS-1, was a United States spacecraft intended to test tracking stations for Project Mercury flights. It grew out of a May 5, 1961 NASA proposal to use Scout rockets to launch small satellites to evaluate the worldwide Mercury Tracking Network in preparation for crewed orbital missions. The launch of Mercury-Scout 1 on November 1, 1961, was unsuccessful, and the satellite failed to reach orbit.

== Background ==
The Mercury Tracking Network was a series of U.S.-owned and operated ground stations and tracking ships, positioned around the world under the flightpath of Mercury spacecraft. When the spacecraft came within several hundred miles of a ground station, it could have line-of-sight voice and telemetry communications by HF (shortwave), VHF or UHF radio and C-band and S-band radar. These communications passes would only last a few minutes, until the ground station disappeared over the horizon. Between ground stations, Mercury spacecraft were out of communications, except for an occasional unreliable HF message. In the early 1960s there were no synchronous communications satellites. The ground stations were linked back to NASA's Mercury Control in Florida through land lines, undersea cables and in some cases HF radio.

The concept was approved on May 24. On June 13 the NASA Space Task Group issued requirements for a modified Scout rocket and small communications satellite that became known as Mercury-Scout. The satellite would simulate a Mercury spacecraft, allowing testing of and training with the Mercury Tracking Network.

== Satellite ==
The 67.5 kg MS-1 communications satellite was shaped like a small rectangular box. Within the box, electronics consisted of two command receivers, two minitrack beacons, two telemetry transmitters, an S- and C-band beacon, and antennas; all powered by a 1500 watt-hour battery. Also attached was the fourth stage instrument package. The battery could power the electronics for 18½ hours before running down. To extend the satellite life, the equipment would be powered off by a ground command after the first three orbits (5 hours). During power-down, data results would be analyzed. The satellite would then be powered up for another three orbits (5 more hours). This process would then be repeated a third time. Mercury planners thought that by shutting down and powering up the satellite, the Mercury Tracking Network would get data and experience from the equivalent of three Mercury orbital missions.

== Mission ==
NASA decided to modify a USAF Blue-Scout II, # D-8, for the first Mercury-Scout mission. The U.S. Air Force was already launching Blue Scout rockets from Cape Canaveral and launched this one as well.

Mercury-Scout 1 was readied for launch on October 31 from LC-18B. The prelaunch countdown proceeded normally, but the engine failed to ignite. Pad crews checked out and repaired the ignition circuits and the flight was reattempted the next day. Control started failing only seconds after liftoff and at T+28 seconds, the first stage started to disintegrate. Range Safety issued the destruct command at T+43 seconds. The failure was traced to a technician who had accidentally transposed two wiring connectors in the guidance system, causing pitch errors to be interpreted as yaw errors and vice versa.

NASA canceled further Mercury-Scout missions. By the time Mercury-Scout 1 was launched, the MA-4 mission had already orbited. MA-5 followed MS-1 by 28 days. MA-4 and MA-5 checked out the Mercury Tracking Network making further Mercury-Scout missions unnecessary.

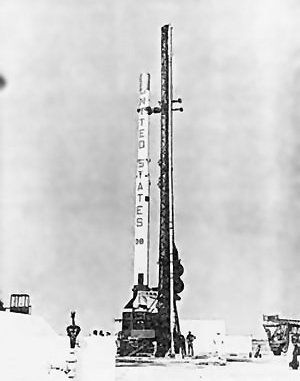
Mercury-Scout 1 ready for launch

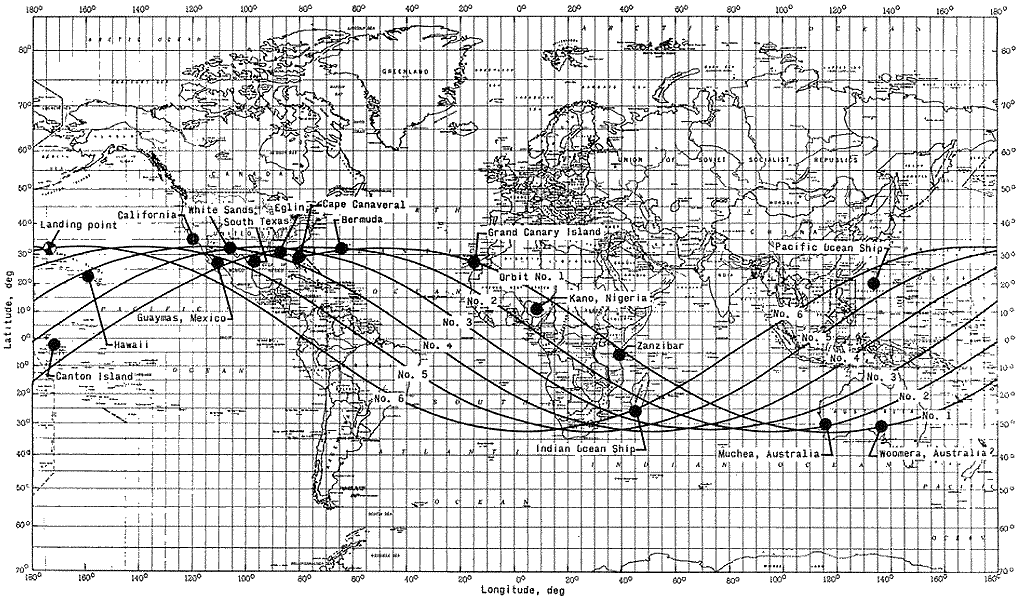
Mercury Tracking Network (NASA)

== Blue Scout II parameters ==
Parameter	1st Stage	2nd Stage	3rd Stage	4th Stage
Gross Mass	10,705 kg	4,424 kg	1,225 kg	238 kg
Empty Mass	1,900 kg	695 kg	294 kg	30 kg
Thrust	470 kN	259 kN	60.5 kN	12.4 kN
Isp	214 s (2.10 kNs/kg)	262 s (2.57 kNs/kg)	256 s (2.51 kNs/kg)	256 s (2.51 kNs/kg)
Burn time	40 s	37 s	39 s	38 s
Length	9.12 m	6.04 m	3.38 m	1.83 m
Diameter	1.01 m	0.79 m	0.78 m	0.46 m
Engine:	Aerojet General Algol 1	Thiokol XM33 (TX-354-3) Castor 2	Allegany Ballistics Lab X-254 Antares 1A	Allegany Ballistics Lab X-248 Altair 1
Propellant	Solid Fuel	Solid Fuel	Solid Fuel	Solid fuel

- Total length: 21.65 m
- Finspan: 2.84 m

LEO payload

- Mass: 30 kg
- To: 300 km orbit
- Att: 28.0 degrees
- Apogee: 2,500 km
