= Manned Space Flight Network =

Set of tracking stations built to support early American space programs

The Manned Space Flight Network (abbreviated MSFN, pronounced "misfin") is a set of tracking stations that was built to support the American Mercury, Gemini, Apollo, and Skylab space programs.

There were two other NASA space communication networks at the time, the Spacecraft Tracking and Data Acquisition Network (STADAN) for tracking satellites in low Earth orbit, and the Deep Space Network (DSN) for tracking more distant uncrewed missions. After the end of Skylab, the MSFN and STADAN were merged to form the Spaceflight Tracking and Data Network (STDN). STDN was in turn replaced by the satellite-based Tracking and Data Relay Satellite System (TDRSS) during the Space Shuttle program, being used as of 2009.

== Orbital versus deep space tracking ==
Tracking vehicles in low Earth orbits (LEO) is quite different from tracking deep space missions. Deep space missions are visible for long periods of time from a large portion of the Earth's surface, and so require few stations (the DSN uses only three, as of February 20, 2010). These few stations, however, require the use of huge antennas and ultra-sensitive receivers to cope with the weak signals from very distant objects. Low Earth orbit missions, on the other hand, are only visible from a small fraction of the Earth's surface at a time, and the satellites move overhead quickly, which requires a large number of tracking stations, spread all over the world. The antennas required for LEO tracking and communication are not required to be as large as those used for deep space, but they must be able to track quickly.

These differing requirements led NASA to build a number of independent tracking networks, each optimized for its own mission. Prior to the mid-1980s, when the Tracking and Data Relay Satellite System (TDRSS) satellites became operational, NASA used several networks of ground-based antennas to track and communicate with Earth orbiting spacecraft. For the Mercury, Gemini, and Apollo missions, these were the primary means of communication, with the Deep Space Network (DSN) being assigned a supporting/backup role.

== Mercury MSFN stations ==
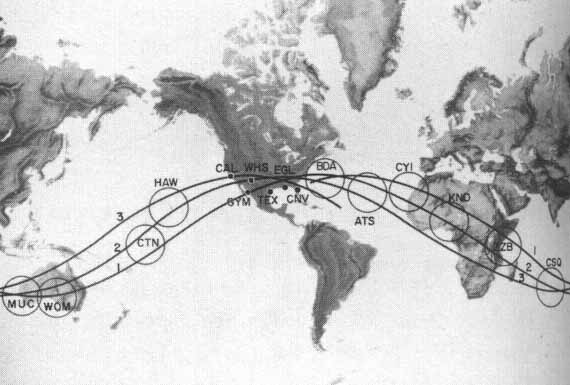
Project Mercury MSFN stations

The Mercury Space Flight Network (MSFN) was completed in 1961, and consisted of 18 ground tracking stations and two ships in the Atlantic and Indian oceans to close gaps between ground stations.

- 1) Mercury Control Center (CNV), Cape Canaveral, Florida
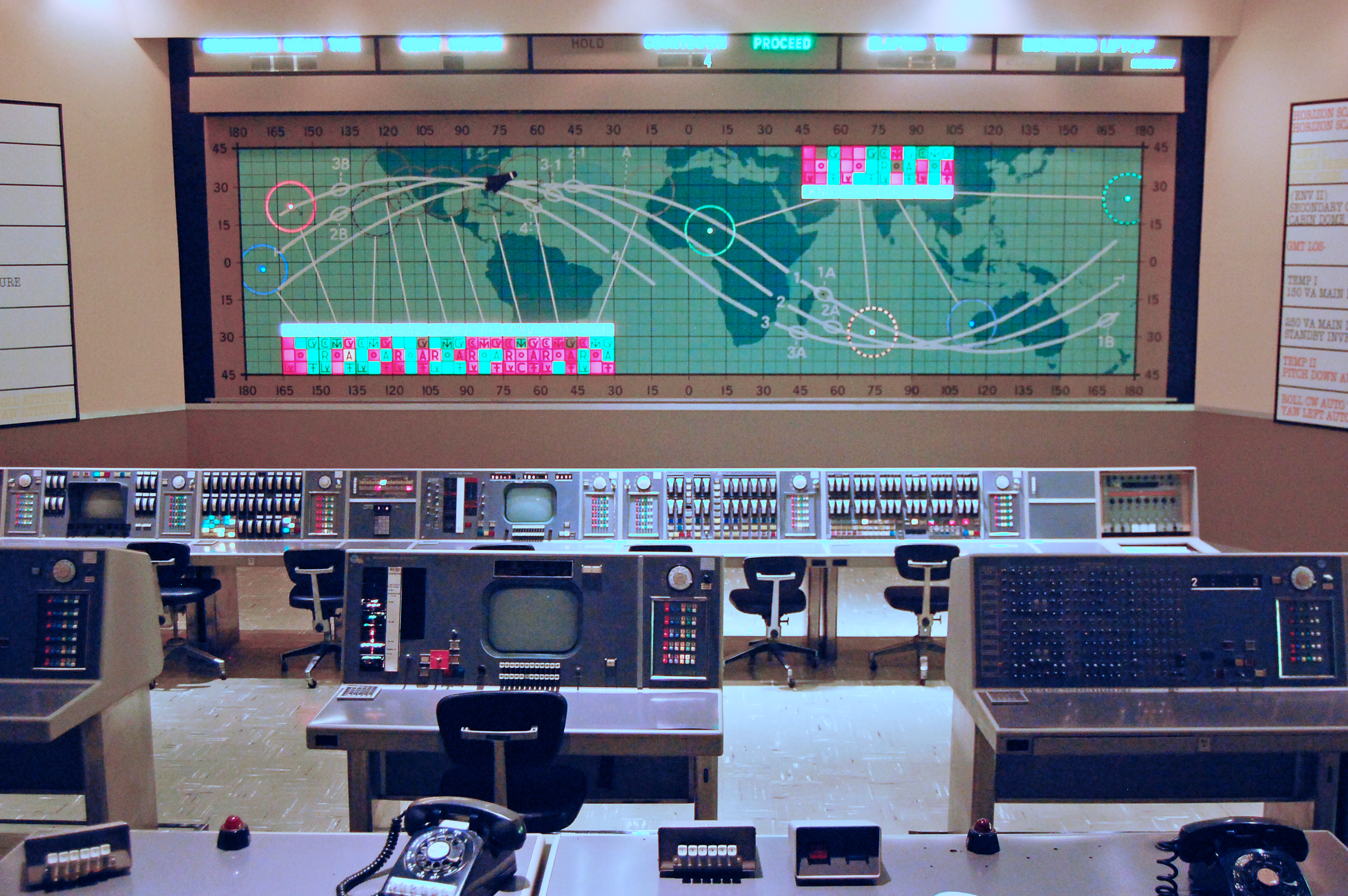
  Recreation of Mercury Control Center
  - Grand Bahama (downrange antenna for MCC)
  - Grand Turk (downrange antenna for MCC)
- 2) Coopers Island, Bermuda (BDA)
- 3) Atlantic Ship (ATS)
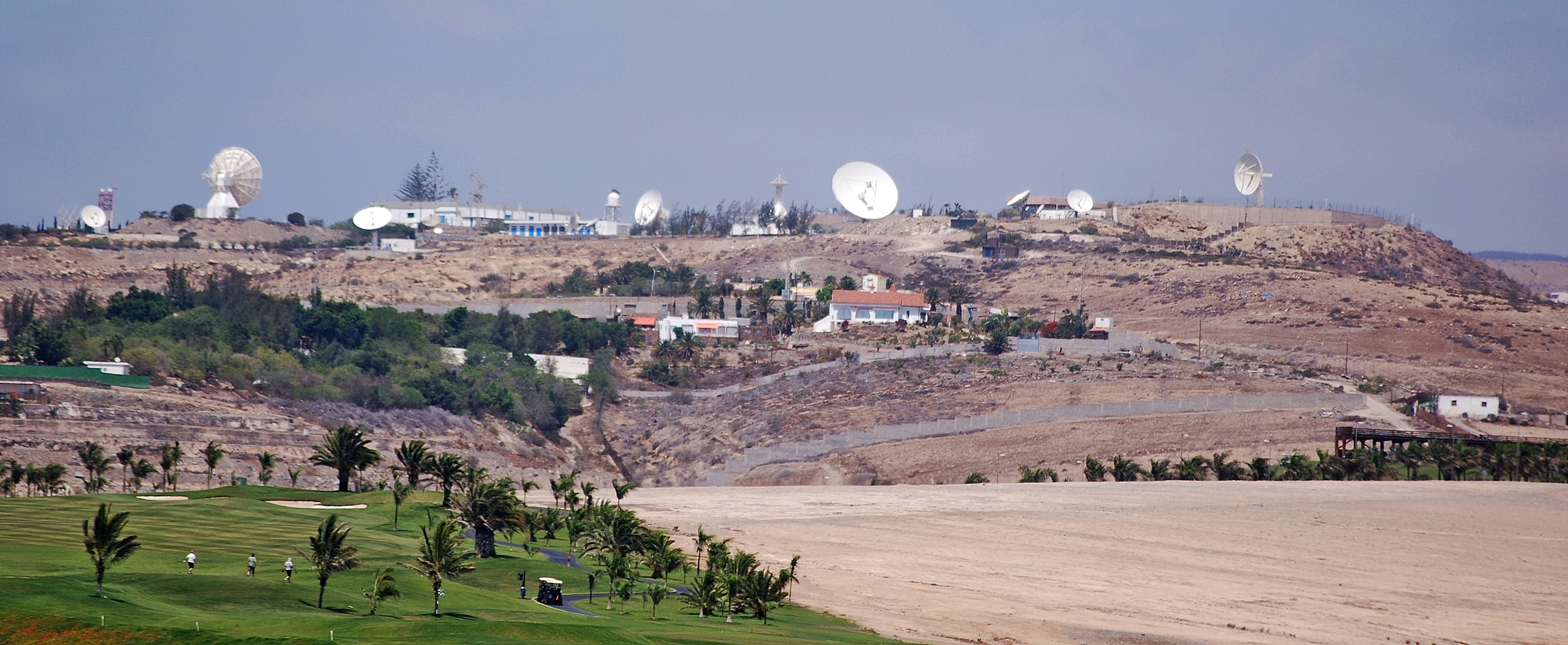
- Maspalomas, Gran Canaria
  4) Maspalomas Station, Grand Canary Island (CAN)
- 5) Kano, Nigeria (KAN)
- 6) Zanzibar (AAB)
- 7) Indian Ocean ship (IOS)
- 8) Muchea, Australia (MUC)
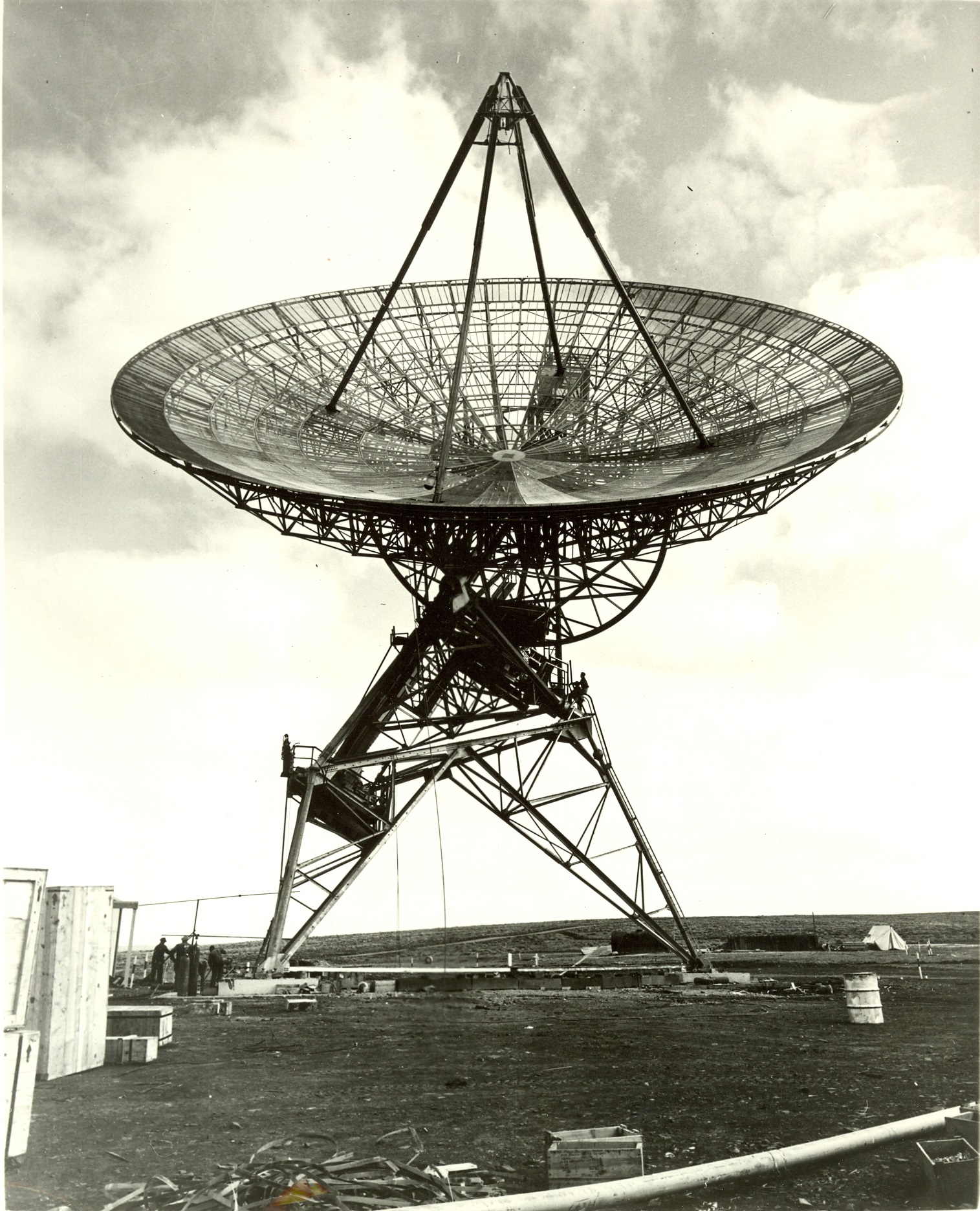
- Woomera in 1964
  9) Woomera Test Range, Australia (WOM)
- 11) Canton Island, Republic of Kiribati (CTN)
- 12) Kauai, Hawaii (HAW)
- 13) Point Arguello, California (CAL)
- 14) Guaymas, Mexico (GYM)
- 15) White Sands, New Mexico (WHS)
- 16) Corpus Christi, Texas (TEX)
- 17) Eglin, Florida (EGL)

There was some variation between flights. For example, between MA-6 and MA-7 the Mid-Atlantic Ship was removed and the Indian Ocean Ship was repositioned to the Mozambique Channel.

A Pacific Ocean ship (USNS Wheeling) and the Goldstone Deep Space Communications Complex (GDS), California were used during Gordon Cooper's 1963 MA-9 flight. On MA-9 the Bermuda FPS-16 radar was the only radar on the entire network that had track during the capsule's insertion into an orbital track, and thus was vital to the verification of proper orbit. The next station to have contact was the Canary Islands. Cooper's flight was delayed for 24 hours due to a malfunction in the Bermuda FPS-16 radar's antenna data system. The radar set failed a CADFISS test, where all the stations in the network had to transmit information to NASA to ensure accurate information could be obtained. The failed part was replaced within 3 hours, but when the Capsule communicator asked for a realistic estimate, he was told 24 hours. The mission was immediately scrubbed for one day.

== Project Gemini ==
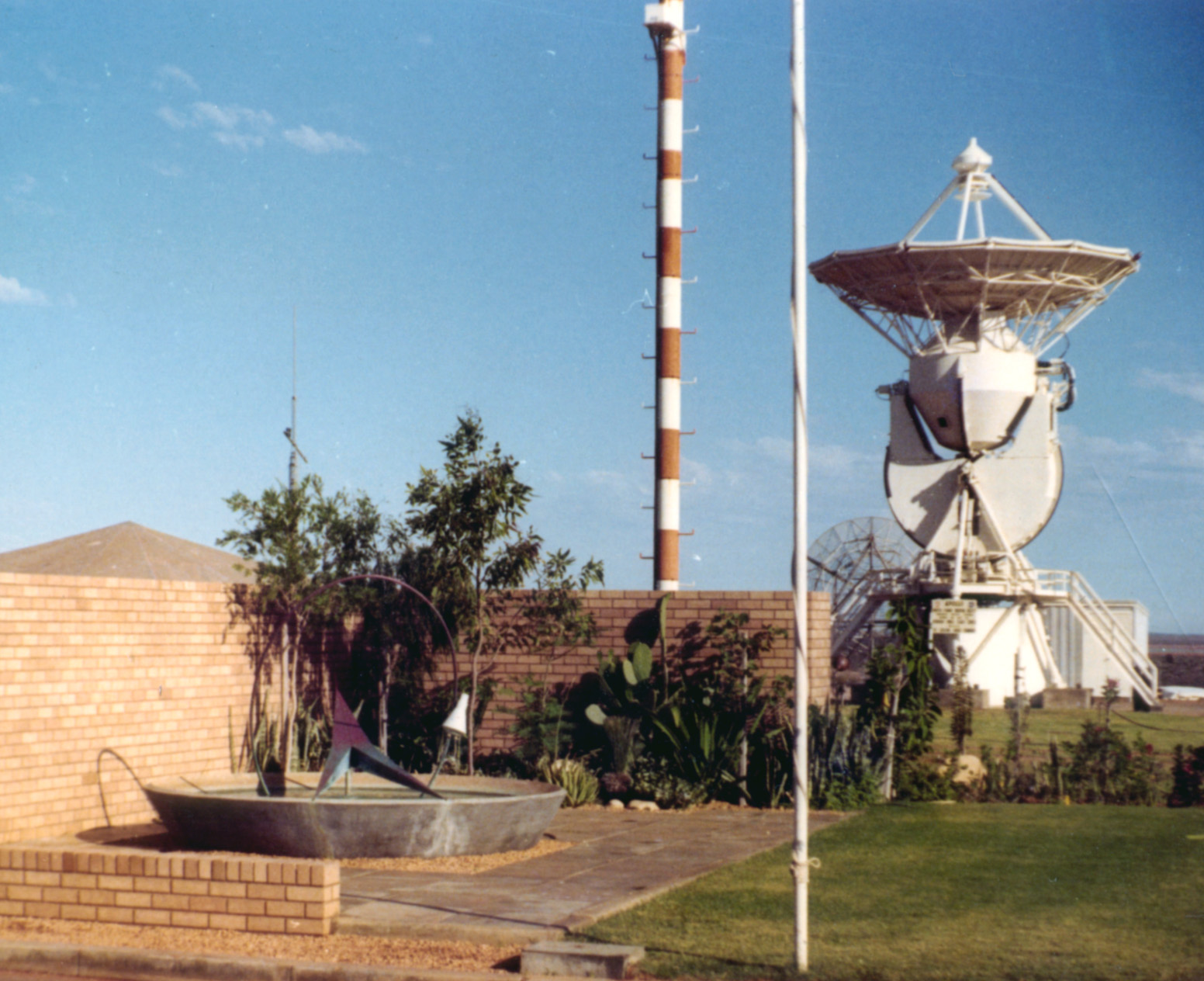
Carnarvon NASA tracking station, circa 1969

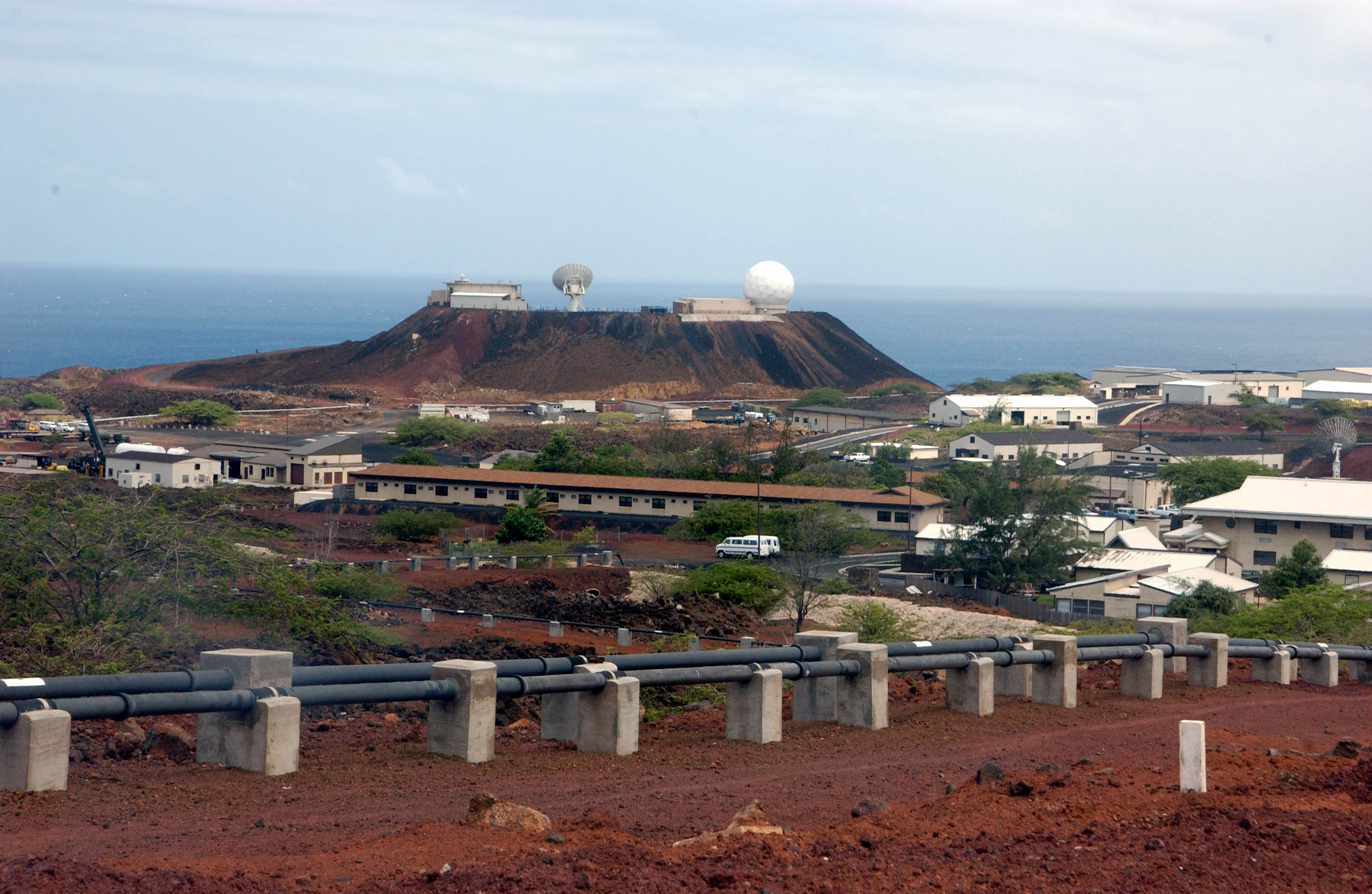
Ascension tracking station in 2005

The network expanded for Project Gemini's longer flights which included rendezvous operations involving two spacecraft. A move toward increased computerization and decreased voice support for Gemini made a more centralized network possible with fewer primary stations and more secondary stations, although those major facilities were better equipped. Some Mercury stations were dropped; many were supplemented with new hardware.

Gemini Network sites:

- Mission Control Center (MCC-K)
- Grand Bahama Island (GBI)
- Grand Turk Island (GTI)
- Bermuda (BDA)
- Antigua (ANT)
- Grand Canary Island (CYI)
- Ascension Island (ASC)
- Kano, Africa (KNO)
- Pretoria, South Africa (PRE)
- Tananarive, Malagasy Republic (TAN)
- Carnarvon, Australia (CRO)
- Woomera, Australia (WOM)
- Canton Island (CTN)
- Kauai Island, Hawaii (HAW)
- Point Arguello, California (CAL)
- Guaymas, Mexico (GYM)
- White Sands, New Mexico (WHS)
- Corpus Christi, Texas (TEX)
- Eglin, Florida (EGL)
- Wallops Island, Virginia (WLP)
- Coastal Sentry Quebec (ship) (CSQ)
- Rose Knot Victor (ship) (RKV)
- Goddard Space Flight Center (GSFC)
- Range Tracker (ship) (RTK)

== The Apollo missions ==
The Manned Space Flight Network (MSFN) during the Apollo era was also known as the Apollo Network. From a NASA technical report on the history of the MSFN:

The technical facts of life were these: the radars of the Mercury and Gemini Networks obviously could not track two spacecraft orbiting the Moon a quarter-million miles away: neither could the small MSFN telemetry antennas hope to pick out the telemetry and voice messages in the weak signals arriving from the vicinity of the Moon. Translated into network hardware terms, Apollo would require at least the following changes in the MSFN:

- A range and range rate tracking system, such as GRARR or the JPL range and range rate system, would have to be incorporated to accurately track the distant spacecraft while it was out of radar range.

- Large dish antennas with high gains, such as the 26-m paraboloids employed in STADAN and the DSN, would have to be added to the MSFN to track and communicate at lunar distances.

- Extant MSFN stations could not properly monitor the very critical mission phases when the spacecraft was inserted into its lunar trajectory and when it plunged into the narrow reentry corridor on the return trip. The result was that the MSFN had to be extended with ships, aircraft, and additional land sites.

- Small paraboloidal antennas would have to be added at some MSFN sites to communicate with the Apollo spacecraft while it was still below the horizon for the 26-m dishes (below about 16,000 km) but beyond the range of the Gemini telemetry antennas.

- The communication traffic during the Apollo missions would be several times that planned for Gemini. NASCOM lines would have to be augmented.

To meet these requirements, the MSFN used a combination of resources. A Jet Propulsion Laboratory (JPL) system called "Unified S-band", or USB, was selected for Apollo communications, which allowed tracking, ranging, telemetry, and voice to all use the same S band transmitter. Near-Earth tracking was provided by upgrading the same networks used for Mercury and Gemini. New large antennas for the lunar phase were constructed explicitly for the MSFN, with Deep Space Network (DSN) large antennas used for backup and critical mission phases.

=== DSN support during Apollo ===
Although normally tasked with tracking uncrewed spacecraft, the Deep Space Network (DSN) also contributed to the communication and tracking of Apollo missions to the Moon, although primary responsibility remained with the Manned Space Flight Network (MSFN). The DSN designed the MSFN stations for lunar communication and provided a second antenna at each MSFN site (the MSFN sites were near the DSN sites for just this reason). Two antennas at each site were needed since the beam widths which the large antennas required were too small to encompass both the lunar orbiter and the lander at the same time. DSN also supplied some larger antennas as needed, in particular for television broadcasts from the Moon, and emergency communications such as Apollo 13.

From a NASA report describing how the DSN and MSFN cooperated for Apollo:

Another critical step in the evolution of the Apollo Network came in 1965 with the advent of the DSN Wing concept. Originally, the participation of DSN 26-m antennas during an Apollo Mission was to be limited to a backup role. This was one reason why the MSFN 26-m sites were collocated with the DSN sites at Goldstone, Madrid, and Canberra. However, the presence of two, well-separated spacecraft during lunar operations stimulated the rethinking of the tracking and communication problem. One thought was to add a dual S-band RF system to each of the three 26-m MSGN antennas, leaving the nearby DSN 26-m antennas still in a backup role. Calculations showed, though, that a 26-m antenna pattern centered on the landed Lunar Module would suffer a 9-to-12 db loss at the lunar horizon, making tracking and data acquisition of the orbiting Command Service Module difficult, perhaps impossible. It made sense to use both the MSFN and DSN antennas simultaneously during the all-important lunar operations. JPL was naturally reluctant to compromise the objectives of its many unmanned spacecraft by turning three of its DSN stations over to the MSFN for long periods. How could the goals of both Apollo and deep space exploration be achieved without building a third 26-m antenna at each of the three sites or undercutting planetary science missions?

The solution came in early 1965 at a meeting at NASA Headquarters, when Eberhardt Rechtin suggested what is now known as the "wing concept". The wing approach involves constructing a new section or "wing" to the main building at each of the three involved DSN sites. The wing would include a MSFN control room and the necessary interface equipment to accomplish the following: 1. Permit tracking and two-way data transfer with either spacecraft during lunar operations. 2. Permit tracking and two-way data transfer with the combined spacecraft during the flight to the Moon 3. Provide backup for the collocated MSFN site passive track (spacecraft to ground RF links) of the Apollo spacecraft during trans-lunar and trans-earth phases. With this arrangement, the DSN station could be quickly switched from a deep-space mission to Apollo and back again. GSFC personnel would operate the MSFN equipment completely independently of DSN personnel. Deep space missions would not be compromised nearly as much as if the entire station's equipment and personnel were turned over to Apollo for several weeks.

The details of this cooperation and operation are available in a two-volume technical report from JPL.

== Current communication with Earth-orbiting spacecraft ==
As of February 20, 2010, three different NASA networks are used - the Deep Space Network (DSN), the Near Earth Network (NEN) and the Space Network/Tracking and Data Relay Satellite System (TDRSS). The DSN tracks probes in deep space (more than 10,000 miles (16,000 km) from Earth), while NEN and TDRSS are used to communicate with satellites in low earth orbit. TDRSS uses a network of 10 geostationary communication satellites, and a single ground station at White Sands Test Facility.

After Apollo, the MSFN no longer needed the large antennas that had been used for lunar communication, which were eventually given over to the DSN. In 1985, the antenna at Honeysuckle Creek Tracking Station was moved to the Canberra Deep Space Communication Complex (CDSCC) DSN site, and the antenna at Fresnedillas was moved to the existing Robledo DSN location. The Goldstone Deep Space Communications Complex antenna is still in its original location.

== See also ==
- Merritt Island Spaceflight Tracking and Data Network station
- NASCOM
