= List of ships of the United States Air Force =

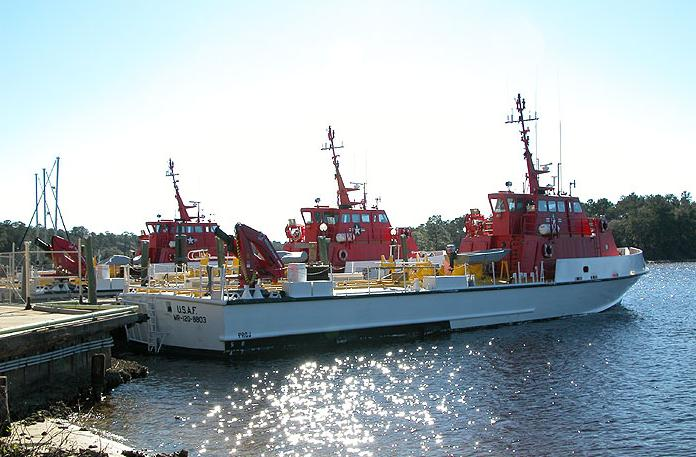
US Air Force ships of the "Tyndall Navy"

Starting in 1957 the US Air Force began operating a small fleet of Missile Range Instrumentation Ships to support missile test ranges. They were designated "ORV" for Ocean Range Vessel. They used the ship name prefix "USAF" (e.g.: USAF Coastal Crusader (ORV-16)). Other ships would use the prefix "USAFS", for "United States Air Force Ship".

The initial twelve Atlantic Missile Range ships were modified World War II cargo vessels. Six were FS-type ships and six were C1-M-AV-1 vessels. All were equipped with telemetry systems. Two of the C1-M-AV-1 types, Coastal Sentry and Rose Knot, were equipped with command/control transmitters.

The smaller FS types were retired by 1960. On 1 July 1964 the USAF tracking ships were transferred to the custody of the Military Sea Transportation Service (MSTS) for operation. (In 1970, the MSTS changed its name to Military Sealift Command (MSC).) The ships were redesignated from USAFS to USNS, along with the hull code "AGM", eg: USAFS Sword Knot (E-45-1852) became USNS Rose Knot (T-AGM-14). MSTS had administrative control of the ships and operational control when the ships were in port. The US Air Force Eastern Test Range had operational control when the ships were at sea. The larger C1-M-AV-1 type ships were redesignated by the Navy as AGM. The original larger ORV were out of service on the Eastern Test Range by 1969.

The US Air Force still operates a small fleet of drone recovery vessels nicknamed the "Tyndall Navy". These ships recover pieces of wreckage from drones and aerial targets from the waters of the Gulf of Mexico. The largest of these vessels are three 120-foot ships operated by the 82nd Aerial Targets Squadron, which is based at Tyndall AFB, Florida.

== US Air Force ship list ==
=== Active ===
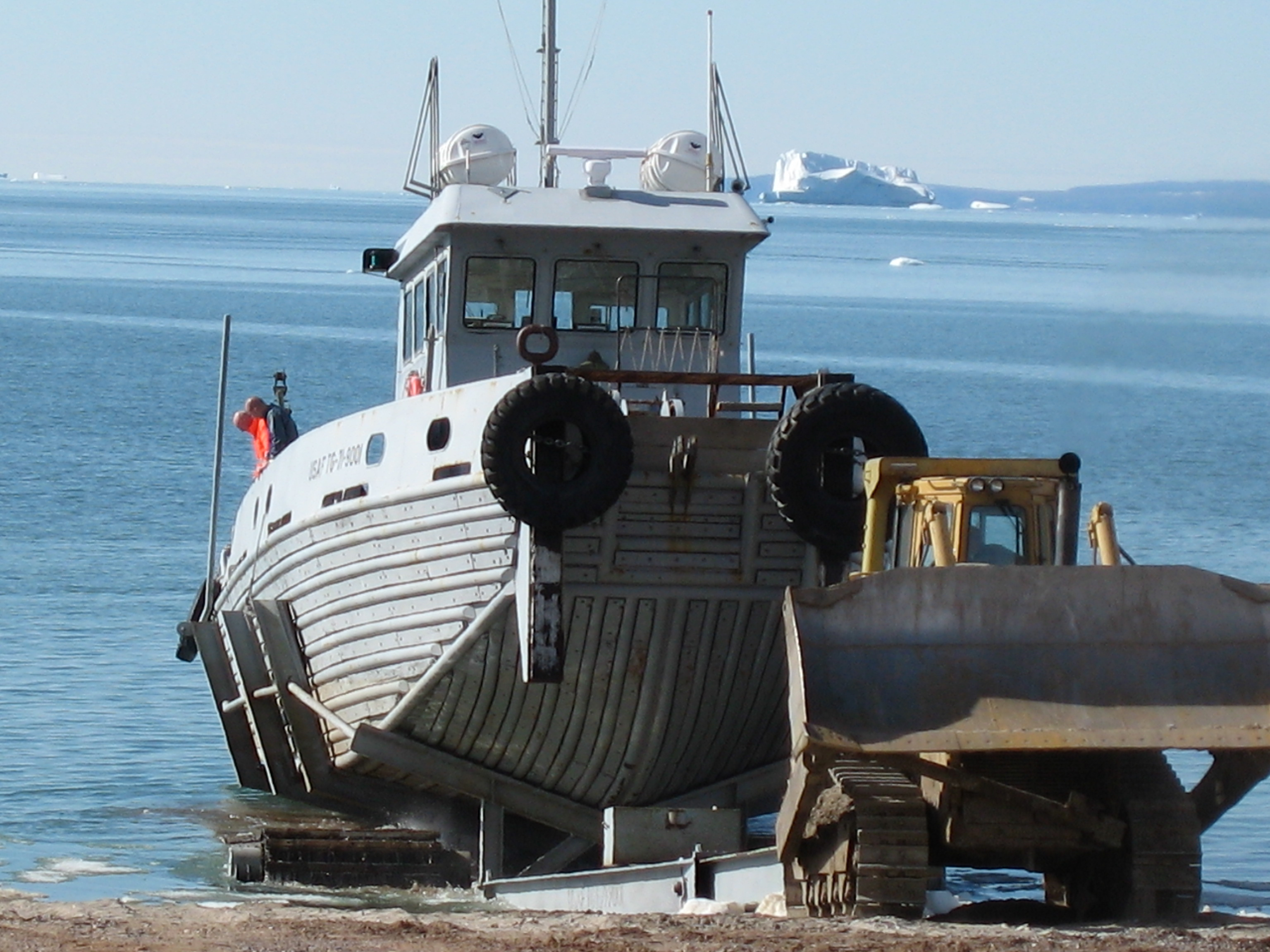
Rising Star

- Thule AB
  - Rising Star tugboat (active as of Aug 2020)
- Tyndall AFB
  - 82nd ATRS drone recovery watercraft (x3 120ft recovery vessels, x2 smaller boats)

=== Inactive ===
- US Army Freight and Supply (FS) Type (all retired)
  - None of the FS type were formally named but were given phonetic call signs and numbers one being E-42-1836.
  - USAF Echo
  - USAF Foxtrot
  - USAF Golf
  - USAF Hotel
  - USAF India
  - USAF Kilo
- C1-M-AV1 Type
  - USAFS Sword Knot (E-45-1852) (scrapped)
  - USAFS Rose Knot (E-45-1850) (disposed)
  - USAFS Coastal Sentry (E-45-1849) (disposed)
  - USAFS Coastal Crusader (E-45-1851, later ORV-16) (disposed)
  - USAFS Timber Hitch (E-45-1848, later ORV-17) (disposed)
  - USAFS Sampan Hitch (E-45-1861, later ORV-18) (scrapped)
- VC2-S-AP3 Type
  - USAF Twin Falls Victory (scrapped)
- C4-S-A1 Type
  - USAFS General Hoyt S. Vandenberg (sunk as artificial reef)
  - USAFS General H. H. Arnold (struck)
- EC2-S-C1 Type
  - USAFS American Mariner (sunk as target)

== See also ==
- Eastern Test Range
- Pan American Airways Guided Missile Range Division
- Missile Test Project
- RAF Marine Branch
