= Missile range =

Missile range may refer to:

- Missile Range Instrumentation Ship
- Pan American Airways Guided Missile Range Division
- Ballistic missiles classified according to their range
- Missile test range

== Locations ==
- Pacific Missile Range Facility
- White Sands Missile Range

== See also ==
- Spaceport
- Pacific Missile Range
