= Joan C. Sherman =

Chemist

- Born: February 13th, 1932; Chicago, Illinois
- Died: March 24, 2025; Indialantic, Florida
- Citizenship: American
- Education: Northwestern University; Florida Institute of Technology
- Awards: Space Coast Outstanding Woman Engineer (1994)
- Scientific career
- Fields: Chemistry
- Workplaces: Harris Corporation

Joan Czerniejewski Sherman was a scientist and Professor of Chemistry. She was considered a pathbreaker by becoming one of the first professors at Florida Institute of Technology (while it was Brevard Engineering College) and one of the first women hired by Radiation Incorporated She became the first woman technical director at Harris Corporation. In 1994, the Society of Women Engineers named her Space Coast Outstanding Woman Engineer. The Town of Indialantic, Florida designated July 21, 2021 as “Joan C. Sherman Day”.

== Early life ==
Sherman was born in Illinois in 1932. She received Bachelor of Science in chemistry from Northwestern University in 1953. She received a Master of Science in Oceanography from Florida Institute of Technology.

== Career ==
She was a research chemist on the Evanston Fluoridation Study and a chemical engineer in the refining Research Department of Universal Oil Company. In 1959, she began working for RCA Service Company in the photography lab of the Missile Test Project. In 1963, she began working at Radiation Incorporated and became a senior engineer. While at Radiation Incorporated, she was a lead chemist at the Micro-Electronics laboratory, where she directed other technicians in development of microelectronics used in the early days of the Space Race.
