= Nevel =

Nevel may refer to:

== People ==
- Ernie Nevel (1918–1988), American baseball player
- Van Nevel, people with that surname

== Places ==
- Nevel Urban Settlement, a municipal formation into which the town of Nevel in Nevelsky District of Pskov Oblast, Russia is incorporated
- Nevel (town), a town in Nevelsky District of Pskov Oblast, Russia
- Lake Nevel, a lake in Nevelsky District of Pskov Oblast, Russia

== Other ==
- Nevel (instrument), a stringed instrument used by ancient Hebrew people
- Nevel (ship), see Tracking ship#Russian Navy / Soviet Navy
- Nevel Papperman, a character in the iCarly American teen sitcom

== See also ==
- Nevelsky (disambiguation)
- Nevele, a municipality in East Flanders Province of Belgium
