= USNS Rose Knot =

United States Navy cargo ship and missile tracker (1945–1968)

- USNS Rose Knot, 1964,

History
- Name: Rose Knot
- Owner: United States Maritime Commission; United States Air Force
- Operator: War Shipping Administration/MC (1945—1954); Military Sea Transportation Service (1955-1956); United States Air Force (1957—1964); Military Sea Transportation Service (1964-1968)
- Builder: Pennsylvania Shipyard Inc., Beaumont, Texas
- Yard number: 334
- Completed: 5 May 1945
- In service: 5 May 1945
- Out of service: 26 March 1968
- Identification: Official number: 247277
- Fate: MARAD approval of sale to China for scrapping in 1987.

General characteristics
- Type: C1-M-AV1; converted to missile range instrumentation ship
- Tonnage: 3,800 GRT; 5,100 DWT
- Length: 338 ft 8 in (103.2 m) LOA
- Beam: 50 ft (15.2 m)
- Draft: 21 ft (6.4 m)
- Depth: 20 ft (6.1 m)
- Propulsion: diesel, 1,700 shp
- Speed: 10.5 kn (12.1 mph; 19.4 km/h)

USNS Rose Knot (T-AGM-14) was a World War II era United States Maritime Commission small cargo ship built in 1945 and delivered to the War Shipping Administration for operation through agent shipping companies and for periods by the Military Sea Transportation Service (MSTS). In 1957 the ship was transferred to the Air Force and converted into a missile range instrumentation ship which operated as USAFS Rose Knot on the U.S. Air Force's Eastern Test Range during the late 1950s and early 1960s. Rose Knot operated under an Air Force contract with Pan American Airways Guided Missile Range Division headquartered in Cocoa Beach, Florida. In July 1964, all Air Force tracking ships were transferred to MSTS for operation with the Air Force in operational control while the ships were at sea as tracking ships. Rose Knot had special facilities for supporting the human spaceflight program and supported the early crewed flights. The ship was owned by the U.S. government until sold for non-transportation use in 1977.

== Characteristics ==
Rose Knot was one of a series of smaller cargo vessels intended for coastal or short routes. The ship was a Maritime Commission (MC) type C1-M-AV1 cargo vessel built by the Pennsylvania Shipyard Inc., Beaumont, Texas as MC hull 2335, yard number 334, official number 247277, was completed and delivered to the War Shipping Administration (WSA) ON 5 May 1945. The C1-M-AV1 ships were named either for types of knots or with "Coastal" being the first part of the name. Rose Knot is a type of decorative knot.

As built the standard C1-M-AV1 cargo ship was 338 ft 8 in (103.2 m) length overall, 50 ft (15.2 m) molded beam, with a molded depth of 20 ft (6.1 m). The vessel was 3,800 GRT, 5,100 DWT with 21 ft (6.4 m) loaded draft. A 1,700 shaft horsepower diesel gave a design speed of 10.5 kn (12.1 mph; 19.4 km/h). (Note: As built. Conversion from cargo to instrumentation ship would change GRT and possibly other specifications.)

== Service history ==
The ship was owned by the U.S. government and operated by government agencies or their agents until sold for non-transportation use 21 June 1977.

=== Cargo ===
Rose Knot was placed in operation by the War Shipping Administration for operation by commercial entities under agreement or charter from 5 May 1945 until 11 May 1955. Lykes Brothers operated the ship under a general agency agreement until 22 April 1946 when Alaska Steamship Company began operation under the same type of agreement. On 17 June 1947, now under the Maritime Commission, the ship was under bareboat charter. Pacific-Atlantic Steamship Company began operating the ship 10 December 1948 again under a general agency agreement until the ship was laid up in the Astoria, Oregon reserve fleet on 3 January 1949. Pacific Atlantic again operated the ship from 19 November 1951 to 11 February 1954 when the ship again went into the Astoria reserve fleet.

On 11 May 1955, the ship came out of reserve for brief operation by the Military Sea Transportation Service (MSTS) through a general agency agreement by West Coast Trans-Oceanic Steamship until 27 October when the ship entered the Olympia, Washington reserve fleet. Rose Knot was briefly back in service under MSTS agreement with West Coast Steamship Company on 18 June through 8 August 1956 when it reentered the Olympia fleet.

=== Range instrumentation ship ===
==== Operators ====
Title to the ship was transferred to the U.S. Air Force on 1 April 1957 and, after conversion, which operation as a range instrumentation ship under Commander, USAF Eastern Test Range (AFETR). The range and its facilities were operated by Pan American World Services and RCA under contract. On 1 July 1964 the USAF tracking ships were transferred to the custody of the Military Sea Transportation Service (MSTS) for operation. MSTS had administrative control of the ships and operational control when the ships were in port. AFETR had operational control when the ships were at sea. At the time of the transfer USNS Rose Knot and USNS Coastal Sentry were to be assigned to Project Gemini.

==== Operations ====
The ship was one of six C1-M-AV1 type vessels joining six converted U.S. Army Freight and Supply (FS) type vessels already supporting missile tests, at the time largely jet-propelled subsonic cruise missiles. (Note: The other five were Timber Hitch; Coastal Sentry; Coastal Crusader; Sword Knot and Sampan Hitch) The FS tracking ships, also known as Ocean Range Vessels (ORV), were nameless, only having their Army FS numeric designations, and had been given phonetic names. (Note: FS Echo; FS Foxtrot; FS Golf; FS Hotel; FS India; FS Kilo) In keeping with that practice USAF Rose Knot, designated E-45-1850 beginning conversion during May 1960, was given the range call sign 'Victor" and is sometimes seen as Rose Knot Victor, abbreviated as RKV, in range and NASA documents.

Rose Knot was one of two ships, the other being Coastal Sentry, assigned to Project Mercury specifically converted to include the tracking equipment and a command transmitter to support human spaceflight as a part of the surface Mercury tracking network. The ship was usually stationed in the Atlantic but also operated in the Pacific.

The ship functioned as a telemetry station located off the coast of Africa at 5N 10W for Mercury-Atlas 6, the February 20, 1962, mission in which John Glenn became the first American to orbit Earth. For Gordon Cooper's May 15–16, 1963, Mercury-Atlas 9 orbital mission, the ship was stationed in the Pacific near Pitcairn Island.

For Project Gemini, it served as a primary tracking station (call sign RKV) off the coast of Peru. During Gemini 8, with Neil Armstrong and David Scott practice-docking with an Agena target vehicle in tests for the Moon missions, the crewed capsule was closing with the Agena over the Pacific and was given the go through communications with Rose Knot. Docking was successful, but the Gemini had to separate and went into a dangerous uncontrolled spin. Armstrong brought the capsule under control, and an emergency recovery was made off Okinawa. An example of the ship's command control function was seen during Gemini 9 when commands sent from the ship disarmed a bus inadvertently left on after the capsule lost signal with the Hawaii ground control station.

Rose Knot, assigned to the South Atlantic Ocean and the Caribbean area, provided the Air Force with metric data on intercontinental ballistic missiles launched from the Cape Canaveral Air Force Station (CCAFS) in Florida.

Rose Knot operated in the intercontinental ballistic missile re-entry area near Ascension Island, and was home-ported out of Recife, Brazil.

== Lay up and disposal ==
Rose Knot was placed in custody of the Suisun Bay reserve fleet on 26 March and permanently transferred 25 October 1968. The ship was sold to King Industrial Development Corporation for non-transportation use for $76,011 on 28 June 1977 with the ship delivered to the buyer 4 August. The MARAD vessel status card has a note dated 2 December 1987 that MARAD approved the sale of Rose Knot by Shipowners, Inc., Bainbridge, Washington for scrapping in China.

== See also ==
- Missile Range Instrumentation Ship
- List of ships of the United States Air Force
- Eastern Test Range
- Pan American Airways Guided Missile Range Division
- Missile Test Project
