= Missile Test Project =

The Missile Test Project (MTP) was a U.S. Air Force program operated by RCA Service Company (RCAS) from Patrick Air Force Base, Florida, under the direction of prime contractor Pan American Guided Missiles Research Division (PAA GMRD) during the 1950s and continuing on for several more decades. Under this program, RCAS instrumented and operated various ships and stations on the Air Force Eastern Test Range with electronic tracking and telemetry equipment. The instrumented ships and stations tracked incoming intercontinental ballistic missiles launched from Cape Canaveral Air Force Station (CCAFS) and, using radar or telemetry, also tracked crewed or uncrewed space vehicles orbiting the Earth.

== Tracking stations ==
MTP instrumented and operated the following tracking stations: CCAFS (designated AFE71), Grand Bahama Island (AFE73), Eleuthera Island (AFE74), San Salvador Island (AFE75), Mayaguana Island (AFE76), Grand Turk Island (AFE77), Antigua Island (AFE86), Chaguaramus, Trinidad (AFE87), Ascension Island (AFE83) and Mahé in the Seychelles in the Indian Ocean (AFE89). The tracking station planned for South Africa was never fully instrumented and eventually found to be redundant.??? The tracking station, Station 13, in South Africa (at Bapsfontein near Pretoria) operated from about 1960 until 1969 and had a tracking radar, telemetry site and GLOTRAC

== Instrumented ships ==
The following small diesel-powered ships were instrumented with tracking equipment: Sword Knot, Rose Knot, Timber Hitch, Coastal Crusader, Coastal Sentry, and Sampam Hitch. In 1964 three very highly advanced instrumented ships were added to the MTP inventory: the USAFS General H. H. Arnold and USAFS General Hoyt S. Vandenberg (both Type C4 ships), as well as the USAS American Mariner (a converted Liberty ship).

These tracking ships, when operated under the direct supervision and operational control of PAA GMRD, were termed "Ocean Range Vessel" (ORV).

== Operations and support ==
The management, logistics and infrastructure of the tracking stations were under the control of PAA GMRD while electronic equipment, such as the tracking radars, was under the control of RCAS personnel. Some bases, such as those at Antigua and at Chagaramus, Trinidad, were located in populated areas and, in some cases, technical personnel were permitted to bring their families with them.

Some tracking stations, such as the one at Ascension Island in the South Atlantic Ocean, were inhospitable and unpopulated and, as a result, it was not feasible for technical personnel to bring their families with them. However, since the Ascension Island tracking station grew to be a very large one and required a large number of maintenance laborers, temporary rotating forces of workers were recruited from tiny Saint Helena Island, located about 800 miles to the south.

Tracking ships were likewise managed by PAA GMRD personnel in areas of operation and logistics. Maintenance and operation of technical equipment, such as radars and related equipment, were under the operational control of RCAS.

Tracking ships normally operated in the South Atlantic Ocean, and the port of Recife, Brazil, contained a small contingent of PAA GMRD and RCAS personnel to assist technical personnel when their vessel arrived in the port for fuel, U.S. mail, logistics, or a recreation period. Providing in-port periods of rest and relaxation for technical personnel and crew members was a priority requirement, since the tracking ships often remained at sea for a month or more. The Vandenberg and Arnold also operated in the Pacific Ocean (North and South). They supported missile launches out of Vandenberg AFB and other locations.

Since RCA employed over a thousand personnel in Florida and downrange on the tracking stations and ships, PAA GMRD provided administrative personnel at each major location to authorize and provide travel orders for the constant movement by air of technical personnel. Air transport on prop-driven aircraft was initially provided by the MATS (Military Air Transport Service) and later by the MAC (Military Airlift Command).

== See also ==
- Radar
- Missile
- Cold War
- Eastern Test Range
- Pan American Airways Guided Missile Range Division
- Patrick Space Force Base
- Air Force Technical Applications Center
- List of ships of the United States Air Force
- USAS American Mariner
