= Mercury Control Center =

Former spacecraft control center at Cape Canaveral, Florida

Coordinates: 28.463082°N 80.582562°W

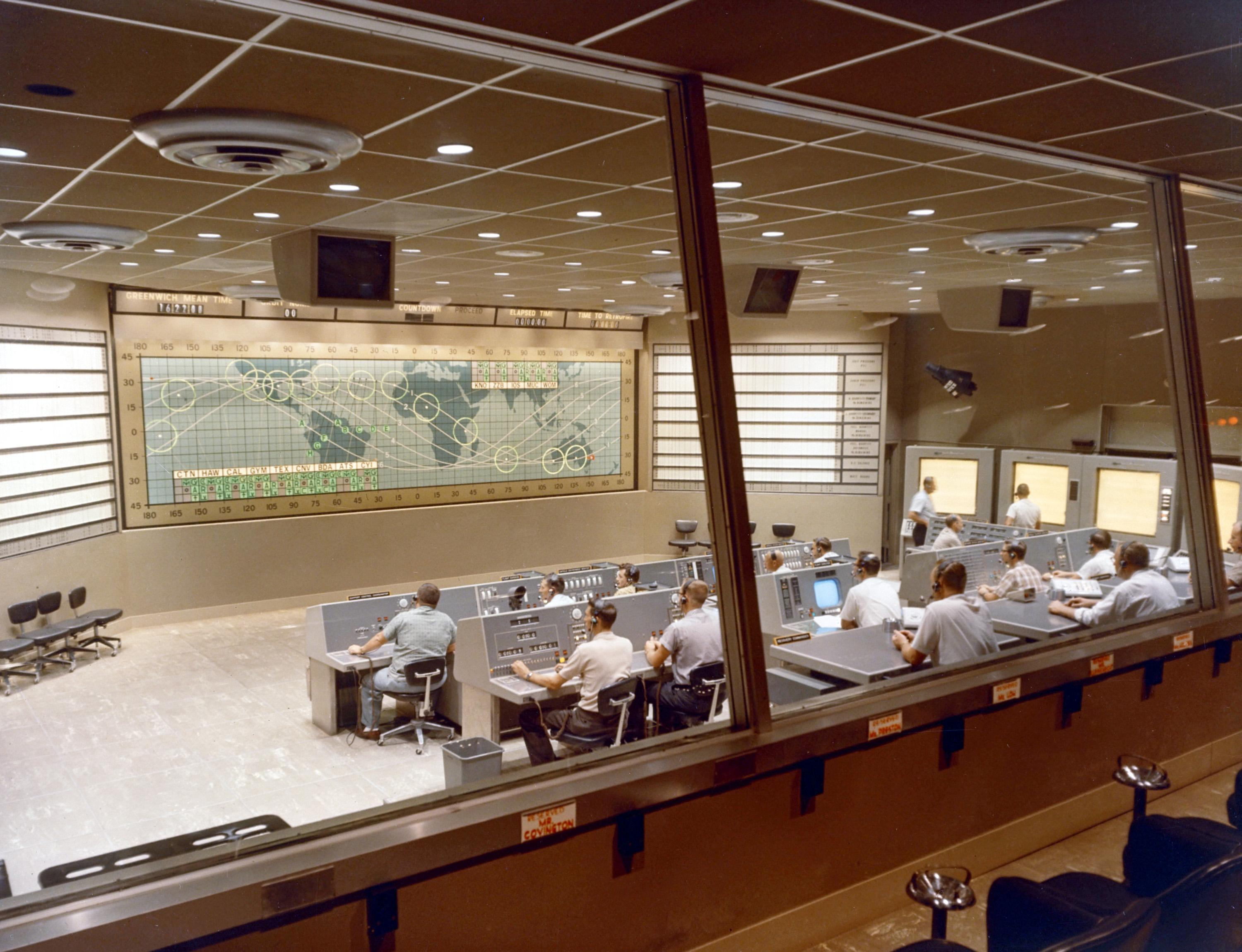
Mercury Control Center during a simulation of the Mercury-Atlas 8 (Sigma 7) flight in 1962

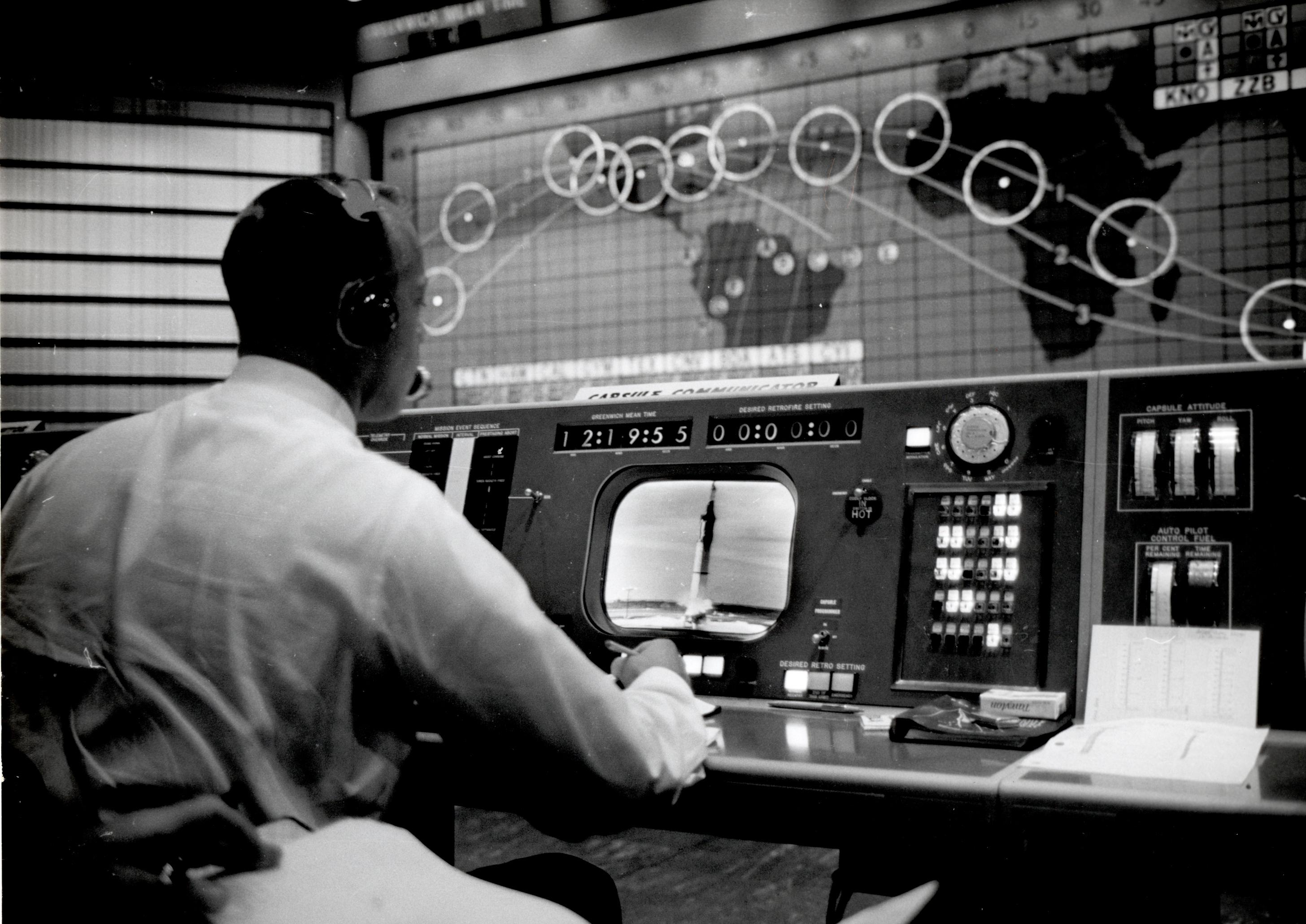
Fellow Mercury astronaut Alan Shepard watches launch at the CAPCOM console in Mercury Control during Gus Grissom's July 21, 1961, Mercury-Redstone 4 (Liberty Bell 7) flight

The Mercury Control Center (also known as Building 1385 or simply MCC) was the facility responsible for control and coordination of NASA’s Project Mercury flight operations, as well as the first three Project Gemini missions (the first two uncrewed). It was located at Cape Canaveral Space Force Station, east of Samuel C. Phillips Parkway.

The facility was expanded in 1963 by contractor Pan American World Airways to support Project Gemini, adding meeting space, data analysis areas, and a Gemini spacecraft trainer.

As mission requirements grew more complex during Gemini and the Apollo program, flight control operations were transferred to the Christopher C. Kraft Jr. Mission Control Center in Houston, Texas. The MCC remained in use for training and meetings, and was opened to public tours on June 1, 1967, continuing in that role through the mid-1990s.

== Configuration ==
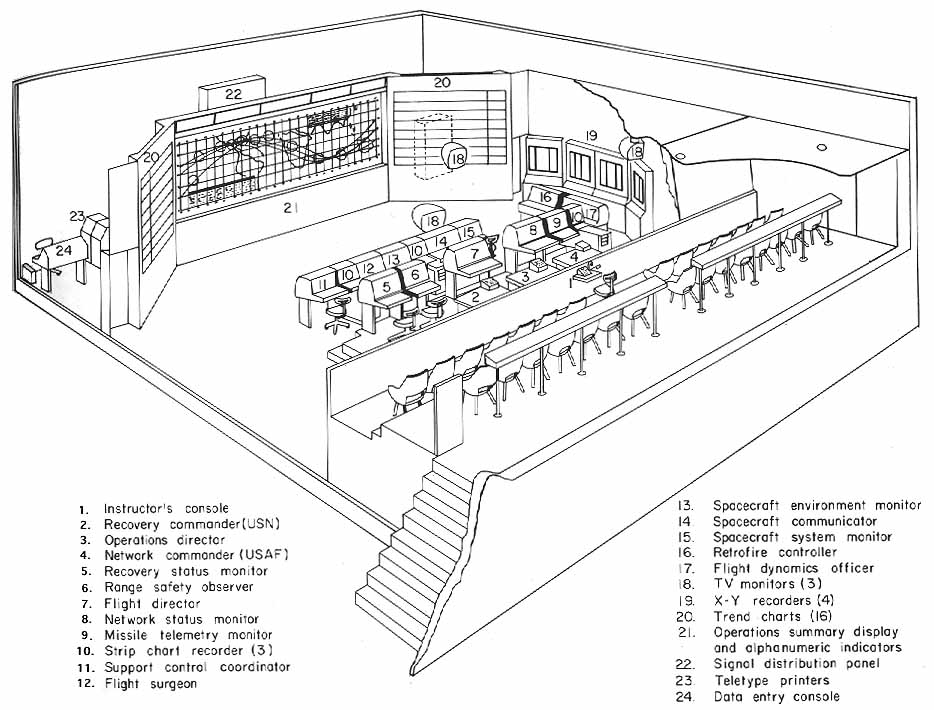
MCC layout

The MCC was organized into three rows and was smaller and simpler than subsequent control centers. It needed only to support a mission of no more than 36 hours with a spacecraft less complex than those used on future missions. Positions included those for monitoring the spacecraft and astronauts during flight as well as positions for supporting the launch and recovery of the capsule.

The MCC also featured a large backlit status map for display of the capsule position. Unlike later mission control centers which featured computer generated graphics, this Mercury-era display operated with a physical two-dimensional representation of the capsule suspended and lit in front of the map.

More modern mission control centers were split between launch control, which is located at the launch site such as Cape Canaveral, and mission control which is located at the Lyndon B. Johnson Space Center for the Apollo and Space Shuttle programs or at the Jet Propulsion Laboratory for unmanned missions.

== Tracking and ground facilities ==
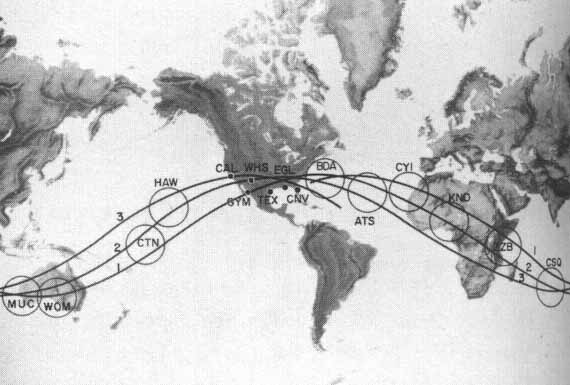
Mercury tracking stations

Though the MCC provided command and control, it was not the only facility involved in supporting Mercury or Gemini flights. The Computing and Communications Center was located at the Goddard Space Flight Center in Greenbelt, Maryland, and provided computing power for missions.

To minimize the time that the spacecraft was out of communications range with the ground, additional ground stations were established at US military facilities, tracking ships, and in cooperation with the governments of Spain, United Kingdom, Nigeria and Australia:

- Cape Canaveral (CNV-MCC)
- Grand Bahama Island (GBI)
- Grand Turk Island (GTI)
- Bermuda (BDA)
- Atlantic Ship (ATS)
- Maspalomas Station, Grand Canary Island (CYI)
- Kano, Nigeria (KNO)
- Zanzibar (ZZB)
- Indian Ocean Ship (IOS)
- Muchea, Australia (MUC)
- Woomera, Australia (WOM)
- Canton island, Kiribati (CTN)
- Kauaʻi, Hawaii (HAW)
- Point Arguello, California (CAL)
- Guaymas, Mexico (GYM)
- White Sands, New Mexico (WHS)
- Corpus Christi, Texas (TEX)
- Eglin Air Force Base (EGL)

== Location ==
The building was erected between 1956 and 1958 and was used throughout Project Mercury (1961–1963) and for Project Gemini through Gemini 3 (1964–1965).

Though the building was listed on the National Register of Historic Places on April 16, 1984, as a contributing property to Cape Canaveral Air Force Station, asbestos removal, other repairs and restoring the center to its original state would have cost $6 million. The decision was made to preserve the consoles and other equipment and destroy the building.

In 1999, consoles, displays and other equipment were moved to the Kennedy Space Center Visitor Complex to a recreation of the MCC inside the Kurt Debus Center. Consoles and displays were reassembled and many are powered on.

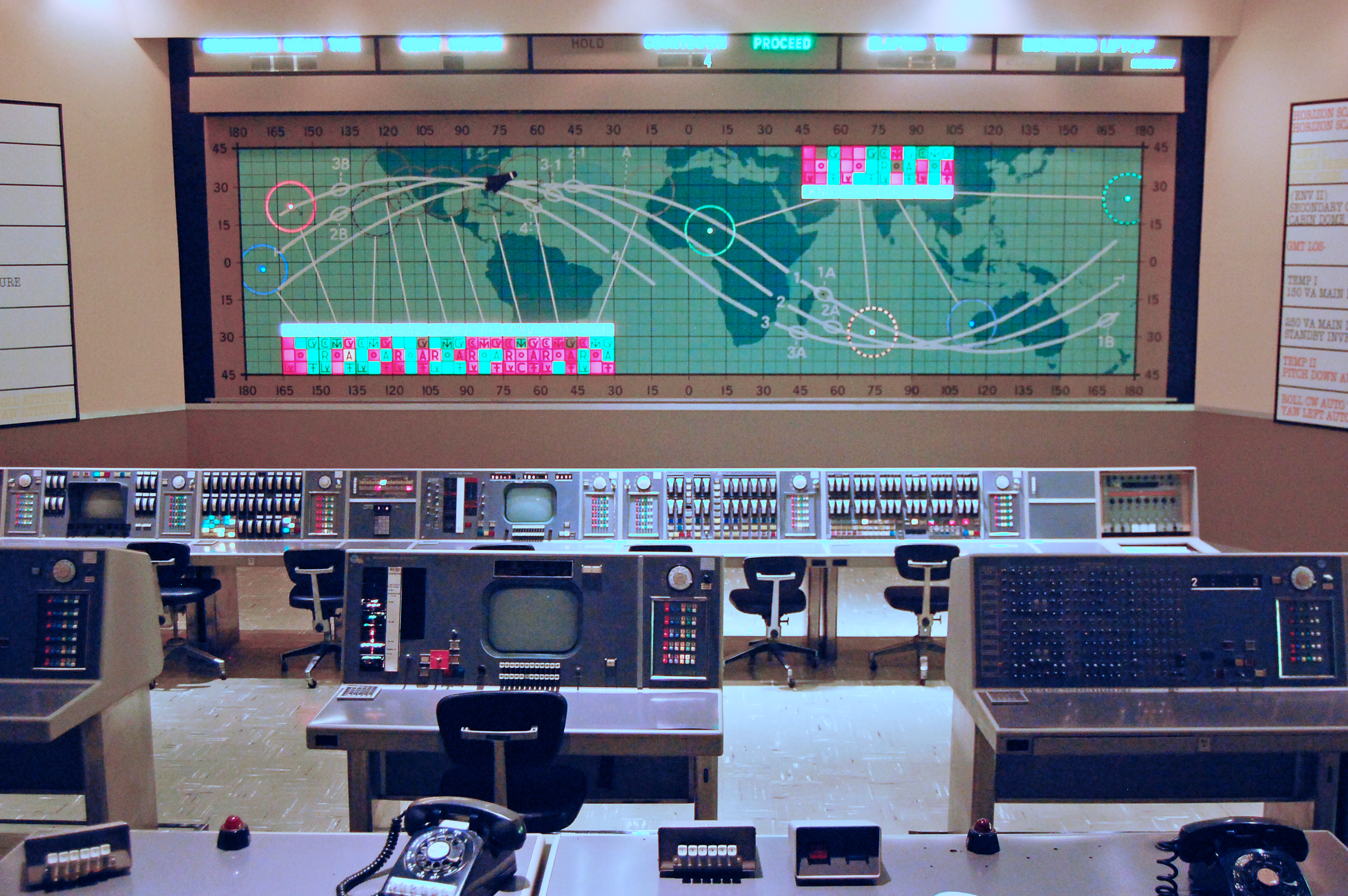
MCC consoles and displays in the Debus Center

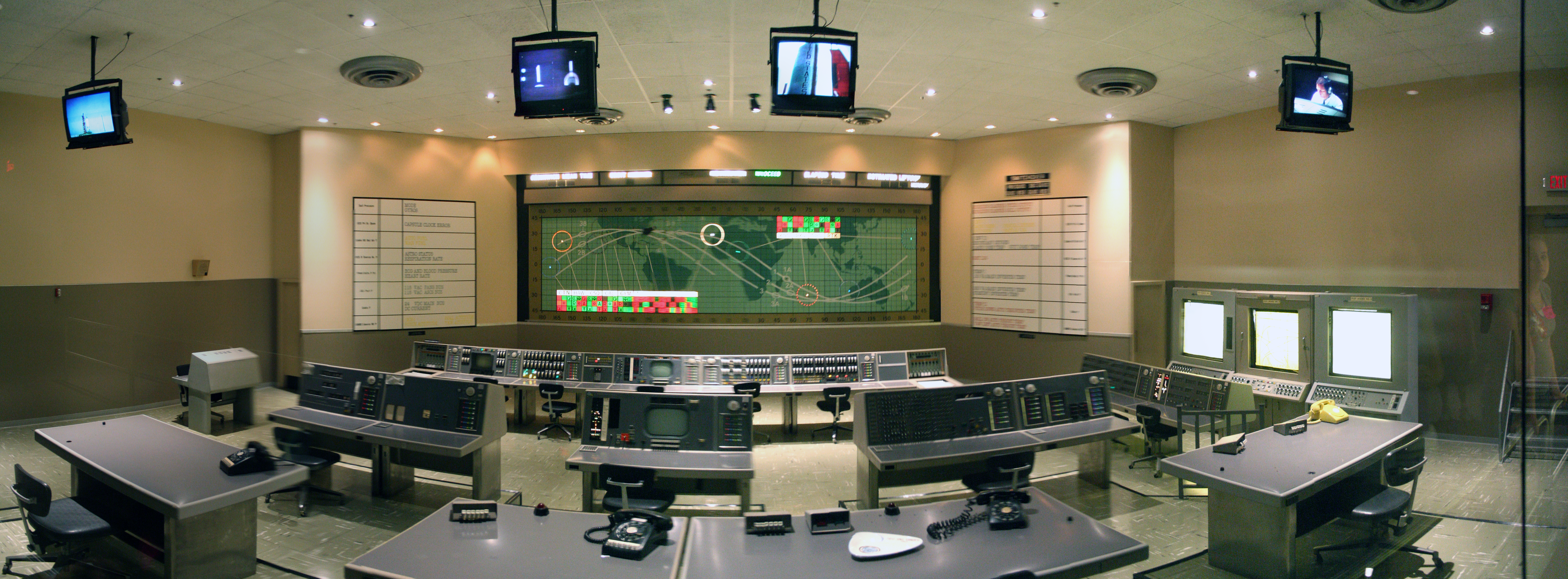
Recreated MCC Flight Control room on exhibit at the Kennedy Space Center Visitors Complex

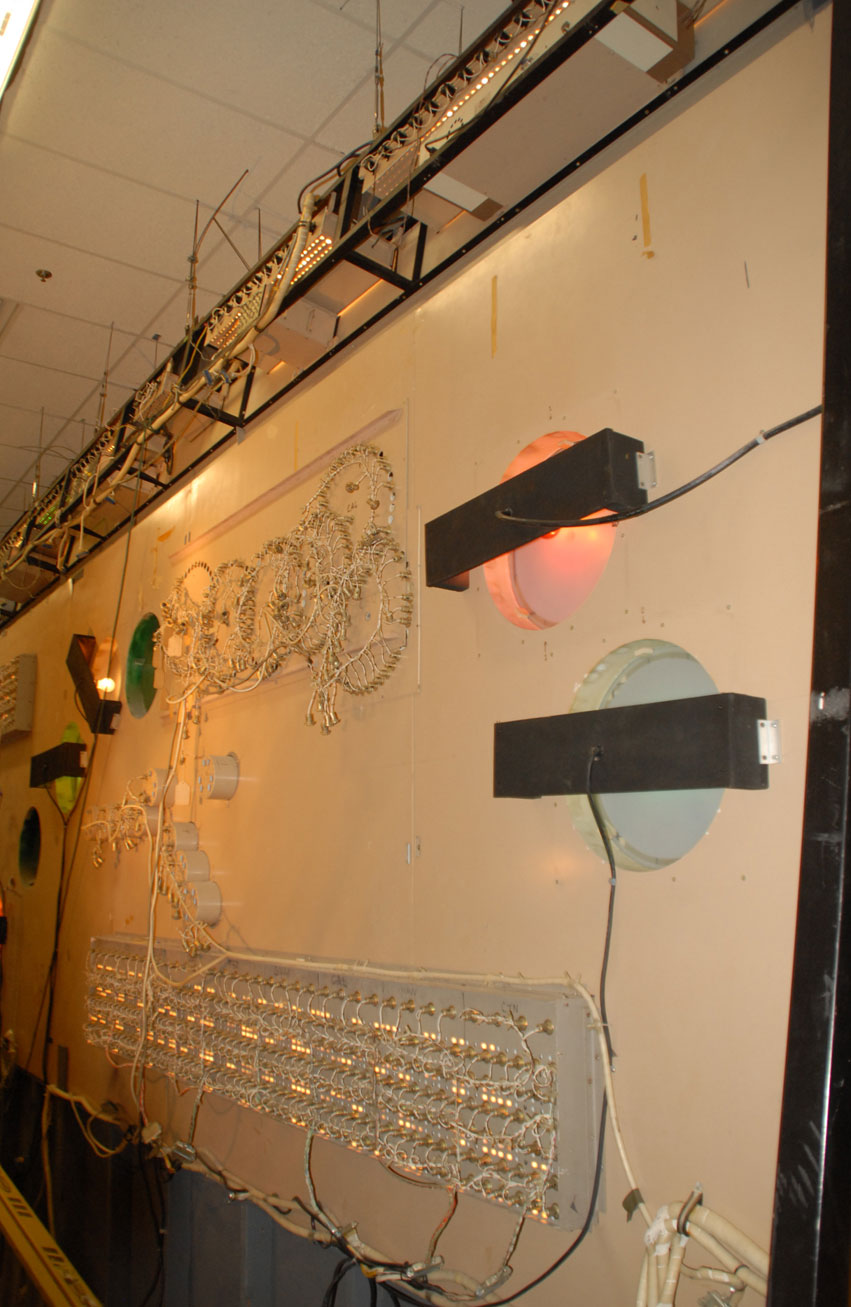
Rear view of status map

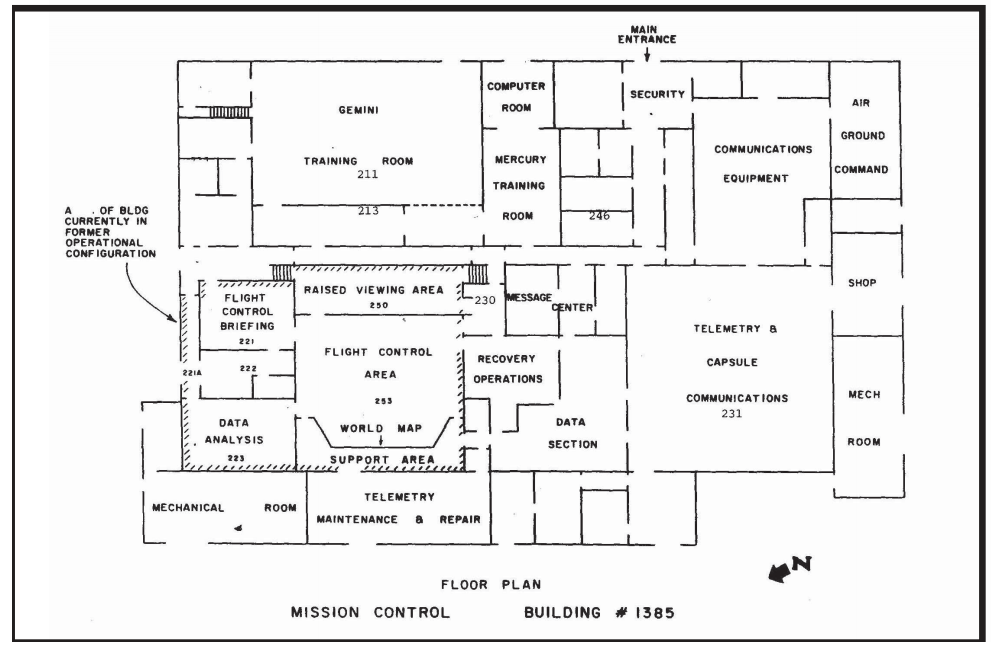
Building floor plan

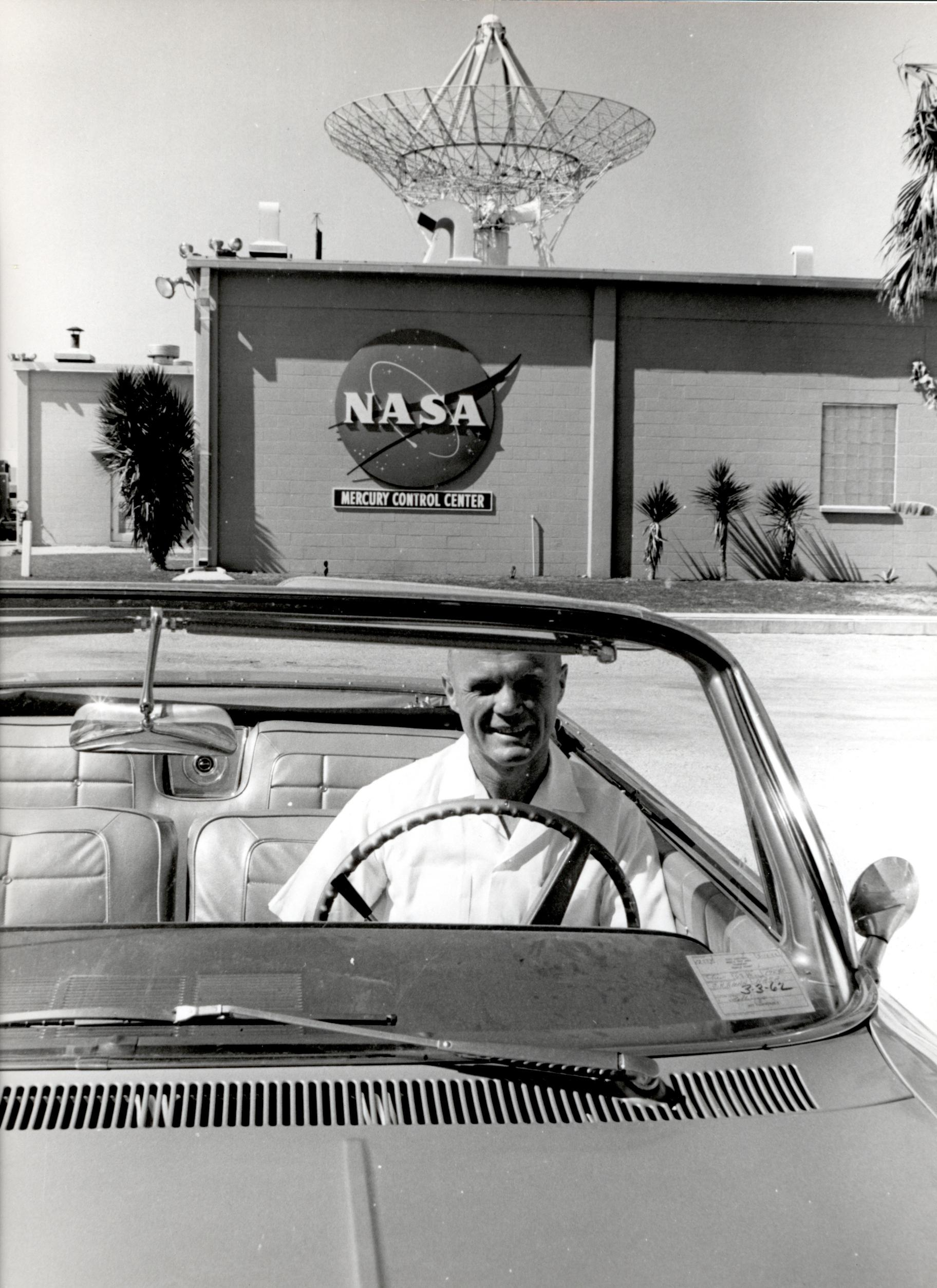
John Glenn in front of Mercury Control

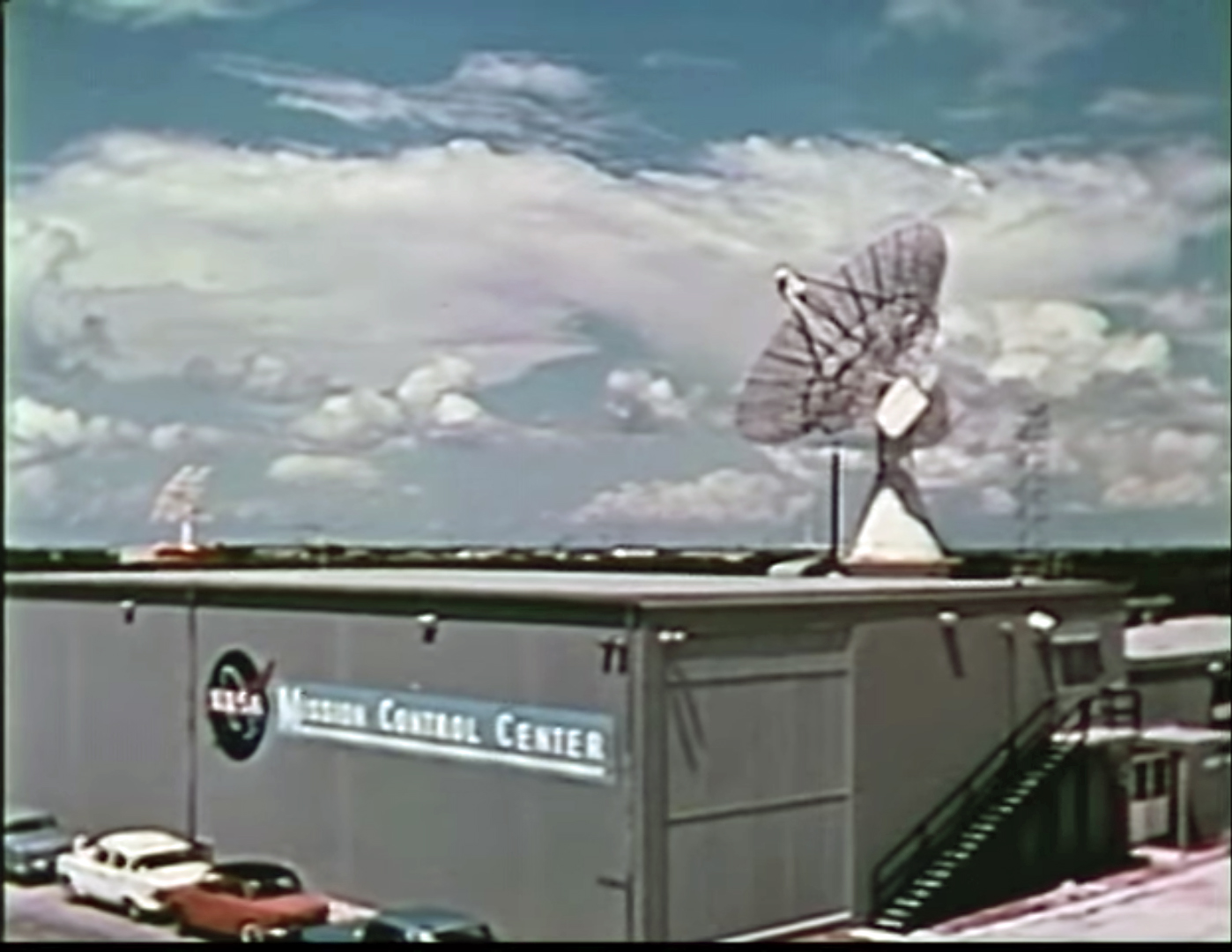
Renamed Mission Control Center
