= RKV =

RKV may refer to:

- Reykjavík Airport (IATA code: RKV), the main domestic airport serving the capital of Iceland
- Rockville station (Amtrak code: RKV), an intermodal train station located in downtown Rockville, Maryland
- USNS Rose Knot (call sign: RKV), a World War II era United States Maritime Commission small cargo ship
- Rahul Vaidya (born 1987; also known as RKV), Indian singer and music composer
- Relativistic kill vehicle, a hypothetical space weapon deriving its destructive power from relativistic phenomena
