= Nevelsky District =

Location of Pskov Oblast in Russia

Location of Sakhalin Oblast in Russia

Nevelsky District is the name of several administrative and municipal districts in Russia:

- Nevelsky District, Pskov Oblast, an administrative and municipal district of Pskov Oblast
- Nevelsky District, Sakhalin Oblast, an administrative district of Sakhalin Oblast

== See also ==
- Nevelsky (disambiguation)
