= Van Nevel =

Van Nevel is a surname. Notable people with the surname include:

- Erik Van Nevel (born 1956), Belgian singer and conductor, nephew of Paul
- Paul Van Nevel (born 1946), Belgian conductor, musicologist, and art historian

== See also ==
- Nevel (disambiguation)
