= USNS Sampan Hitch =

History

United States
- Name: Sampan Hitch
- Namesake: A name retained
- Builder: Walter Butler Shipbuilding Inc., Superior, Wisconsin
- Laid down: date unknown, as a type (C1-M-AV1) hull, MC hull 2133
- Launched: 12 July 1945
- Completed: August 1945
- Acquired: by the U.S. Navy in 1964
- In service: c. 1958
- Out of service: date unknown
- Stricken: date unknown
- Fate: sold for scrapping 23 April 1973 to a South Korean steel firm

General characteristics
- Type: missile range instrumentation ship
- Displacement: 3,366 tons light; 6,090 tons full load
- Length: 338 ft 9 in (103.25 m)
- Beam: 50 ft 4 in (15.34 m)
- Draft: 17 ft 7 in (5.36 m)
- Propulsion: Diesel, single propeller
- Speed: 11.5 knots
- Endurance: 30 days at sea
- Complement: unknown
- Sensors & processing systems: telemetry
- Armament: none

USNS Sampan Hitch (T-AGM-18) was a missile range instrumentation ship which earlier operated as the U.S. Air Force Ocean Range Vessel USAFS Sampan Hitch (ORV-1836) on the U.S. Air Force's Eastern Test Range during the late 1950s and early 1960s. Sampan Hitch operated under an Air Force contract with Pan American Airways Guided Missile Range Division headquartered in Cocoa Beach, Florida.

Sampan Hitch, assigned to the South Atlantic Ocean and the Caribbean area, provided the Air Force with metric data on intercontinental ballistic missiles launched from the Cape Canaveral Air Force Station (CCAFS) in Florida.

Sampan Hitch operated in the intercontinental ballistic missile re-entry area near Ascension Island, and was home-ported out of South Atlantic Fleet Hqtrs, Chagaramus (Port of Spain) Trinidad, BWI.

== Acquisition by the Navy ==
Sampan Hitch was acquired from the U.S. Air Force by the U.S. Navy in 1964.

== Operational data ==
Operational data while on U.S. Navy service during post-1964 period on this vessel is lacking.

== Inactivation ==
Sampan Hitch was struck from the Navy List at an unknown date, and was sold for scrapping 23 April 1973 to Dongkuk Steel Mill Company, Ltd., South Korea. Her subsequent fate is not known.

== See also ==
- Missile Range Instrumentation Ship
- List of ships of the United States Air Force
- Eastern Test Range
- Pan American Airways Guided Missile Range Division
- Missile Test Project
