= USNS Sword Knot =

American tracking ship

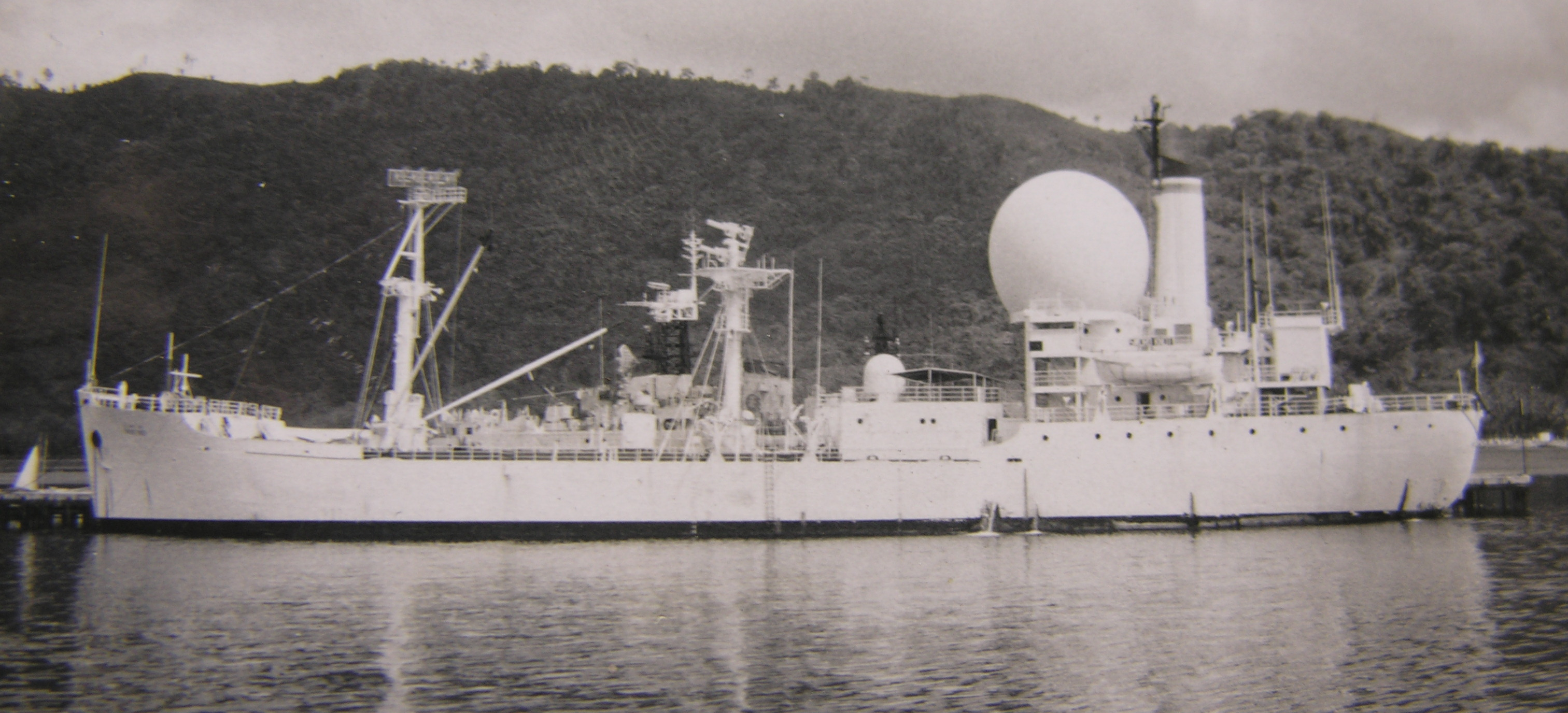
- Sword Knot in Trinidad, 1966

History

United States
- Name: Sword Knot
- Namesake: Sword knot
- Builder: Consolidated Steel Corporation, Wilmington, California
- Launched: 14 March 1945
- Completed: May 1945
- Acquired: 30 May 1945, Maritime Commission
- Acquired: 14 March 1957, U.S. Air Force
- Acquired: 1964, U.S. Navy
- Stricken: 7 April 1971
- Identification: Radio callsign NEBR
- Honors and awards: National Defense Service Medal
- Fate: Sold for scrapping, 15 May 1973; Delivered to Joffe Corp, 22 June 1973

General characteristics
- Type: Type C1-M-AV1, MC hull 2466; Missile range instrumentation ship
- Displacement: 3,366 long tons (3,420 t)
- Length: 338 ft 9 in (103.25 m)
- Beam: 50 ft 4 in (15.34 m)
- Draft: 17 ft 7 in (5.36 m)
- Propulsion: Diesel, single propeller
- Speed: 11.5 knots (21.3 km/h; 13.2 mph)
- Endurance: 30 days at sea

USNS Sword Knot (T-AGM-13) was a missile range instrumentation ship which operated as USAFS Sword Knot on the United States Air Force's Eastern Range during the late 1950s and early 1960s. Sword Knot operated under an Air Force contract with Pan American Airways Guided Missile Range Division headquartered in Cocoa Beach, Florida.

Sword Knot, assigned to the South Atlantic Ocean and the Caribbean area, provided the Air Force with metric data on intercontinental ballistic missiles launched from the Cape Canaveral Air Force Station (CCAFS) in Florida as part of the Missile Test Project. It operated in the intercontinental ballistic missile re-entry area near Ascension Island, and was home-ported out of Recife, Brazil.

After transfer to the U.S. Navy's Military Sea Transportation Service, Sword Knot was reassigned to the Western Range and home-ported in Port Hueneme, California. There, she provided data on missiles launched from Vandenberg Air Force Base.
