= RCA Service Company =

Former American company headquartered in New Jersey

RCA Service Company (RCAS) was headquartered at Cherry Hill, New Jersey, and was a division of the Radio Corporation of America (RCA) created to service appliances and equipment manufactured by RCA.

RCAS was divided into three major groups:

- RCA Technical Services, which serviced the products manufactured by RCA for commercial customers such as broadcast equipment, computers, medical equipment, etc.
- RCA Government Services, which operated administrative government contracts such as the Ballistic Missile Early Warning System (BMEWS) sites around the world. (See below for a list of other contracts.) This division later became known as GE Government Services after General Electric acquired RCA in 1986.
- RCA Consumer Services.

Technical personnel employed by RCA Service Company, prior to it becoming RCA Government Services, were usually categorized as "global field service engineers".

== Consumer services ==
The Consumer Products Division had offices in most major American cities and whose repairmen would service products manufactured for the home by RCA. The division also sold service contracts on the television products sold by RCA.

Effective July 1, 2009 RCA, which was acquired by TTE/TTL, a China company, terminated all of the RCA Authorized Service Companies who have provided repair services for RCA consumer products for over 60 years. RCA also terminated all of their consumer service employees and shut down. TTE/TTL contracted with DEX to provide repair services. DEX does not intend to use independent service companies, but rather their subcontractor computer technicians.

== Contracts held by RCA Service Company ==
Major contracts administered as prime contractor or sub-contractor by RCA Service Company include:

- AEGIS Ballistic Missile Defense System, Dahlgren, Virginia, and Wallops Island, Virginia, Port Hueneme, California, and at other sites.
- Alaskan Radar Warning System (ARWS) Project. Headquartered in Anchorage, Alaska, with 17 locations throughout the state of Alaska.
- Atlantic Fleet Weapons Training Facility (AFWTF) (defunct as of 2003), based out of eastern end of the island of Vieques, Puerto Rico.
- Atlantic Undersea Test and Evaluation Center (AUTEC), Andros Island, Bahamas. Headquartered on Southern Boulevard at the Old Airport building in West Palm Beach, Florida.
- FAA's precision runway monitor, Memphis, Tennessee.
- Goddard Space Flight Center, Special Payloads Project, Greenbelt, Maryland. Headquartered out of Lanham, Maryland.
- Joint Readiness Training Center, Fort Chaffee.
- Marshall Space Flight Center, Huntsville, Alabama.
- Minority Supplier Development Program, Fairfield, Connecticut.
- Missile Test Project (MTP), at Patrick Space Force Base, and at the Cape Canaveral Space Force Station as well as at downrange sites located at Grand Bahama Island, Eleuthera, Grand Turk Island, Antigua, Trinidad, Ascension Island and associated Missile Range Instrumentation Ships. Headquartered at 750 South Orlando Avenue, Cocoa Beach, Florida.
- NASA Lyndon B. Johnson Space Center, Houston, Texas.
- National Training Center, Fort Irwin, California.
- Naval Ocean System Center (NOSC) Low Frequency Active/Critical Sea Test (LFA/CST) System, San Diego, California.
- NOAA/NESDIS CDA Station Project, Fairbanks, Alaska.
- Sea-Based Aerostat Systems Project, West Melbourne, Florida.
- Surveillance Towed Array Sensor System (SURTASS), based out of Norfolk, Virginia.
