= USNS Timber Hitch =

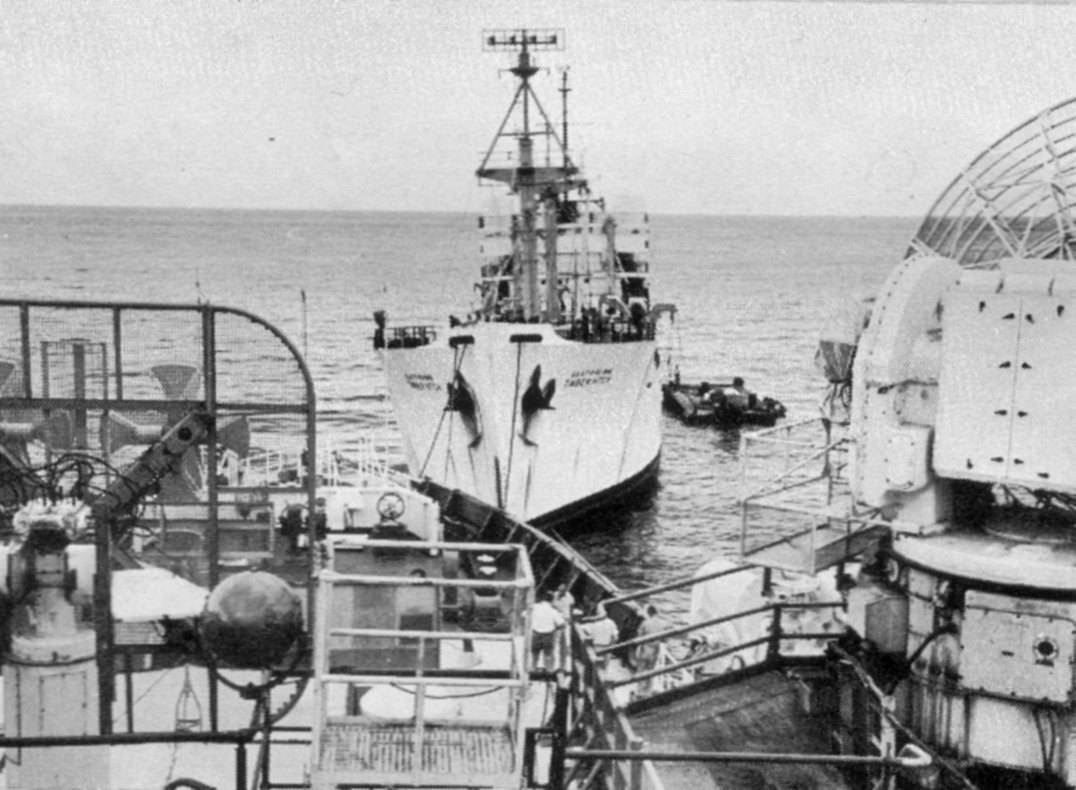
- Timber Hitch receiving fresh water from the USAS American Mariner, Clarence Bay, Ascension Island, in December 1961.

History

United States
- Name: Timber Hitch
- Namesake: Timber hitch
- Owner: War Shipping Administration (WSA)
- Operator: Grace Line Inc.
- Ordered: as a type (C1-M-AV1) hull, MC hull 2315
- Awarded: 17 February 1944
- Builder: Consolidated Steel Corporation, Ltd., Wilmington, California
- Cost: $1,205,427.45
- Yard number: 1220
- Way number: 2
- Laid down: 26 August 1944
- Launched: 12 October 1944
- Sponsored by: Mrs. W. F. Pruden
- Completed: 19 January 1945
- Identification: Call sign: ANAL
- Fate: Laid up in National Defense Reserve Fleet, Astoria, Oregon, 12 September 1949; Laid up in National Defense Reserve Fleet, Olympia, Washington, 23 November 1956; Transferred to the United States Air Force, 2 April 1957

United States
- Name: Timber Hitch
- Owner: United States Air Force
- Reclassified: Ocean Range Vessel
- Identification: ORV-17
- Fate: Transferred to the United States Navy, 1 July 1964

United States
- Name: Timber Hitch
- Owner: United States Navy
- Operator: Military Sea Transportation Service
- In service: 1 July 1964
- Out of service: 1968
- Reclassified: Missile Range Instrumentation Ship
- Stricken: 9 October 1969
- Identification: Hull symbol: T-AGM-17; Call sign: NTIY
- Fate: Laid up in the James River Reserve Fleet, Lee Hall, Virginia, 5 May 1968; Sold for scrapping, 27 July 1977

General characteristics
- Class & type: Alamosa-class Cargo Ship; Timber Hitch-class Missile Range Instrumentation Ship
- Type: C1-M-AV1
- Displacement: 3,366 long tons (3,420 t) (light); 6,090 long tons (6,190 t) (full load)
- Length: 338 ft 9 in (103.25 m)
- Beam: 50 ft 4 in (15.34 m)
- Draft: 17 ft 7 in (5.36 m)
- Propulsion: Diesel, single propeller
- Speed: 11.5 kn (21.3 km/h; 13.2 mph)
- Endurance: 30 days at sea
- Sensors & processing systems: telemetry
- Armament: none

USNS Timber Hitch (T-AGM-17) was a US Navy missile range instrumentation ship which earlier operated as the US Air Force Ocean Range Vessel USAFS Timber Hitch (ORV-17) on the US Air Force's Eastern Test Range during the late 1950s and early 1960s. Timber Hitch operated under an Air Force contract with Pan American Airways Guided Missile Range Division headquartered in Cocoa Beach, Florida.

Timber Hitch, assigned to the South Atlantic Ocean and the Caribbean area, provided the Air Force with metric data on intercontinental ballistic missiles launched from the Cape Canaveral Air Force Station (CCAFS) in Florida.

Timber Hitch operated in the intercontinental ballistic missile re-entry area near Ascension Island, and was home-ported out of Recife, Brazil.

== Construction ==
SS Timber Hitch was laid down 26 August 1944, under a Maritime Commission (MARCOM) contract, MC hull 2315, by the Consolidated Steel Corporation, Ltd., Wilmington, California; she was sponsored by Mrs. Paul N. Mulvany, the wife of the assistant chief of the Construction & Inspection section at the regional office of MARCOM, and was launched on 10 October 1944.

== Acquisition by the Navy ==
Timber Hitch was acquired from the US Air Force by the US Navy, on 1 July 1964.

== Operational data ==
Operational data while on US Navy service during post-1964 period on this vessel is lacking.

== Inactivation ==
Timber Hitch was struck from the Navy List 9 October 1969. She was sold for scrapping, 27 July 1977, along with three other ships, for $309,999. She was withdrawn from the fleet on 21 October 1977.

== See also ==
- Missile Range Instrumentation Ship
- List of ships of the United States Air Force
- Eastern Test Range
- Pan American Airways Guided Missile Range Division
- Missile Test Project

== Bibliography ==
- Priolo, Gary P. (26 February 2021). "USNS Timber Hitch". NavSource.
- Maritime Administration. "Timber Hitch". Ship History Database Vessel Status Card. U.S. Department of Transportation, Maritime Administration.
- "SS Timber Hitch".
