= Nevelsky =

Nevelsky (masculine), Nevelskaya (feminine), or Nevelskoye (neuter) may refer to:

- Nevelsky District, several districts in Russia
- Nevelsky Urban Okrug, a municipal formation which Nevelsky District in Sakhalin Oblast, Russia is incorporated as
- Nevelskoye, a rural locality (a selo) in imeni Lazo District of Khabarovsk Krai, Russia
