= USNS Coastal Crusader =

Cargo ship of the United States Navy

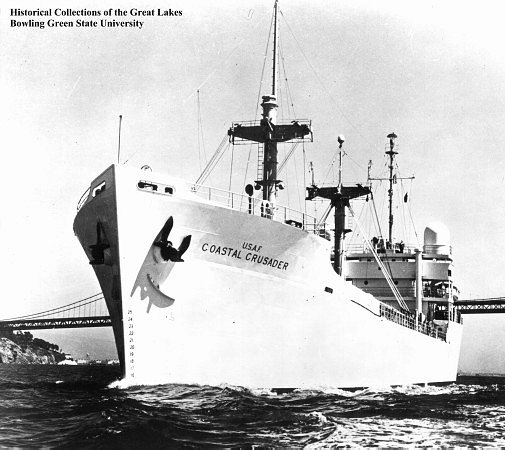
- USAFS Coastal Crusader (ORV-16) underway, date and location unknown.

History

United States
- Name: Wexford (never received name); Coastal Crusader
- Namesake: Wexford County, Michigan
- Ordered: as type (C1-M-AV1) hull, MC hull 2174
- Builder: Leathem D. Smith Shipbuilding Company, Sturgeon Bay, Wisconsin
- Yard number: 340
- Laid down: 12 April 1945
- Launched: 24 June 1945
- Completed: 26 July 1945
- Commissioned: Delivered to the US Maritime Commission (MARCOM) prior to commissioning, July 1945
- Renamed: Coastal Crusader
- Identification: Hull symbol: AK-220 (never received number)
- Fate: Delivered to the US Army, 30 August 1946

United States
- Name: Pvt. Joe R. Hastings
- Namesake: Joe R. Hastings
- Operator: US Army
- In service: 30 August 1946
- Out of service: 27 October 1947
- Fate: Declared surplus, 12 December 1949, delivered to MARCOM

United States
- Name: Coastal Crusader
- Owner: Military Sea Transportation Service (MSTS)
- Operator: Coastwise
- In service: 12 May 1955
- Out of service: 3 November 1955
- Fate: Transferred to US Air Force, 27 August 1956

United States
- Name: Coastal Crusader
- Operator: US Air Force
- In service: 13 March 1957
- Out of service: 1964
- Reclassified: Ocean Range Vessel (ORV-16)
- Fate: Transferred to the US Navy, 1964

United States
- Name: Coastal Crusader
- Owner: US Navy
- Operator: MSTS
- In service: 1964
- Reclassified: Missile Range Instrumentation Ship (T-AGM-16), 1964; Survey Ship (AGS-36), 1969
- Stricken: 30 April 1976
- Fate: Sold for scrap, 12 April 1977

General characteristics
- Class & type: Alamosa-class cargo ship; Coastal Crusader-class Missile range instrumentation ship
- Type: C1-M-AV1
- Tonnage: 5,032 long tons deadweight (DWT)
- Displacement: 2,382 long tons (2,420 t) (standard); 7,450 long tons (7,570 t) (full load)
- Length: 388 ft 8 in (118.47 m)
- Beam: 50 ft (15 m)
- Draft: 21 ft 1 in (6.43 m)
- Installed power: 1 × Nordberg, TSM 6 diesel engine; 1,750 shp (1,300 kW)
- Propulsion: 1 × propeller
- Speed: 11.5 kn (21.3 km/h; 13.2 mph)
- Capacity: 3,945 t (3,883 long tons) DWT; 9,830 cu ft (278 m^{3}) (refrigerated); 227,730 cu ft (6,449 m^{3}) (non-refrigerated)
- Complement: 15 Officers; 70 Enlisted

USNS Coastal Crusader (AK-220/ORV-16/T-AGM-16/AGS-36) was an Alamosa-class cargo ship that was constructed for the US Navy during the closing period of World War II. She was later acquired by the US Army in 1946 and the US Air Force in 1957 before being reacquired by the USN in 1964 and as a missile range instrumentation ship.

== Construction ==
Coastal Crusader, a C1-M-AV1 cargo vessel, was laid down under a US Maritime Commission (MARCOM) contract, MC hull 2174, on 12 April 1945 at Sturgeon Bay, Wisconsin, by the Leathem D. Smith Shipbuilding Company; launched on 24 June 1945; sponsored by Mrs. DeForrest Colburn; and completed on 26 July 1945.

On 25 February 1945, the Navy had assigned the name Wexford and the designation AK-220 to the projected ship; but the contract for her acquisition by the Navy was cancelled in August 1945 because of the cessation of hostilities in the Pacific Ocean and the surrender of Japan. Coastal Crusader thus entered mercantile service, never having borne the name Wexford.

== US Army service ==
The vessel was placed in service 30 August 1946, by the US Army Transportation Service as USAT Private Joe R. Hastings. She was returned to the Reserve Fleet on 27 October 1949.

== US Air Force service ==
Renamed Coastal Sentry, she was acquired by the US Air Force on 13 March 1957, which redesignated her an Ocean Range Vessel, USAFS Coastal Crusader (ORV-16). She operated on the Air Force's Eastern Test Range during the late 1950s and early 1960s.

== US Navy service ==
The US Navy acquired Coastal Crusader from the Air Force in 1964, a placed her in service with the Military Sea Transportation Service (MSTS) and redesignated her a Missile Range Instrumentation Ship, USNS Coastal Crusader (T-AGM-16). Navy records indicate Coastal Crusader was redesignated as a Survey Ship, Coastal Crusader (AGS-36) in 1969, and finally struck from the Navy List on 30 April 1976.

== Inactivation ==
Coastal Crusader was subsequently sold by the Maritime Administration (MARAD) on 12 April 1977. She was scrapped later that year.

== Notes ==
Citations

== Bibliography ==
Online resources

- "Wexford". Dictionary of American Naval Fighting Ships. Naval History and Heritage Command. 18 November 2015. This article incorporates text from this source, which is in the public domain.
- "C1 Cargo Ships". www.ShipbuildingHistory.com. 28 August 2009.
- "Coastal Crusader (AGS-36)". NavSource. 17 April 2015.
- "COASTAL CRUSADER (T-AGM-16)". United States Department of Transportation. Archived from the original on 4 November 2016.
