= Tracking ship =

Class of ships used for tracking missiles and satellites

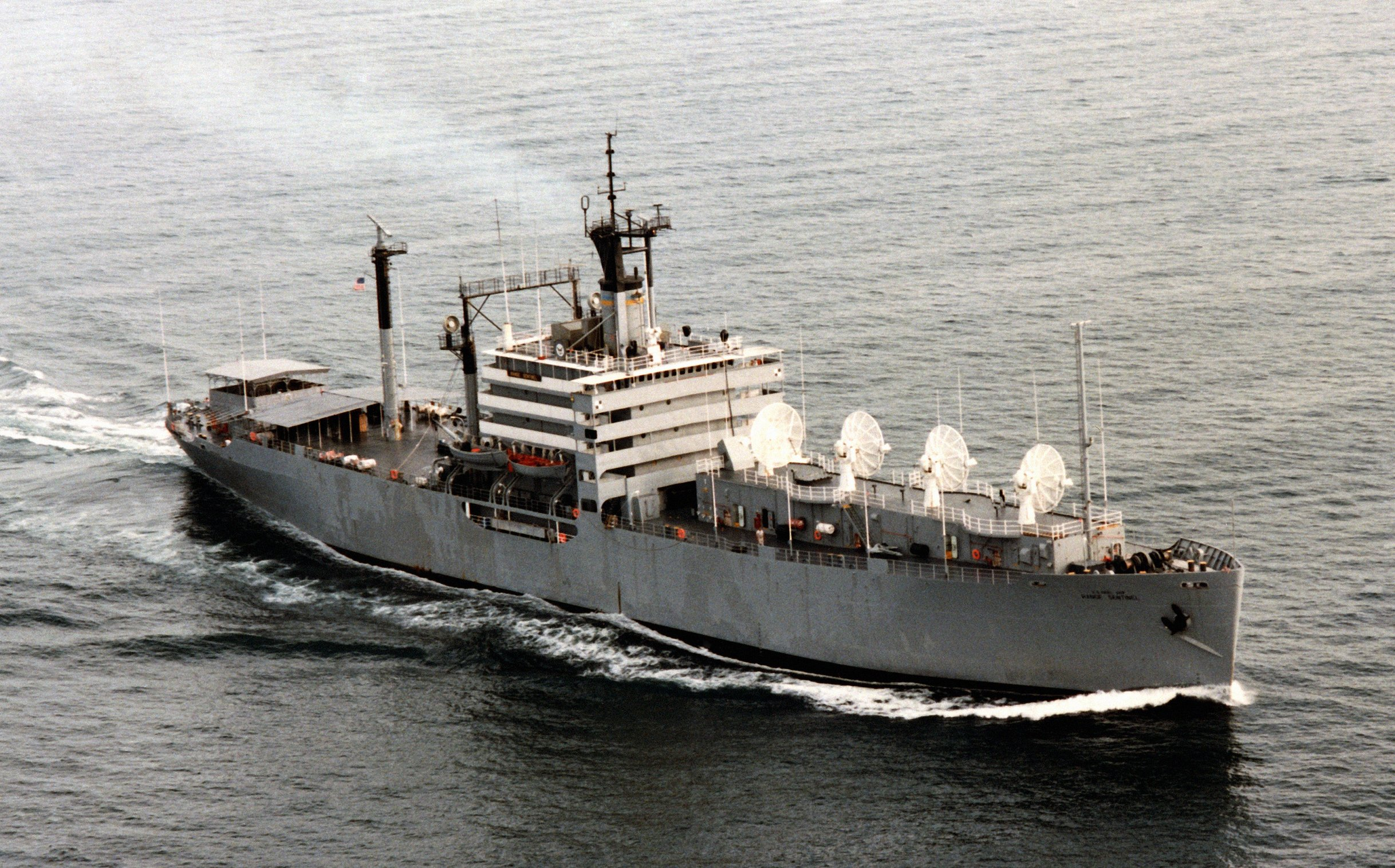
Missile range instrumentation ship USNS Range Sentinel (T-AGM 22)

A tracking ship, also called a missile range instrumentation ship or range ship, is a ship equipped with antennas and electronics to support the launching and tracking of missiles and rockets. Since many missile ranges launch over ocean areas for safety reasons, range ships are used to extend the range of shore-based tracking facilities.

In the United States, the initial tracking ships were constructed by the U.S. Army and then the U.S. Air Force to support their missile programs. They were generally built on a surplus Liberty ship or Victory ship hull. By 1964, the U.S. Navy took over all the range ships and introduced more.

In some Navies, such a ship is also given the type designation "Vigilship" or "Veladora", with the Designation Letter "V" or Letters "VC".

== Missile range instrumentation ships ==
=== People's Liberation Army Aerospace Force ===
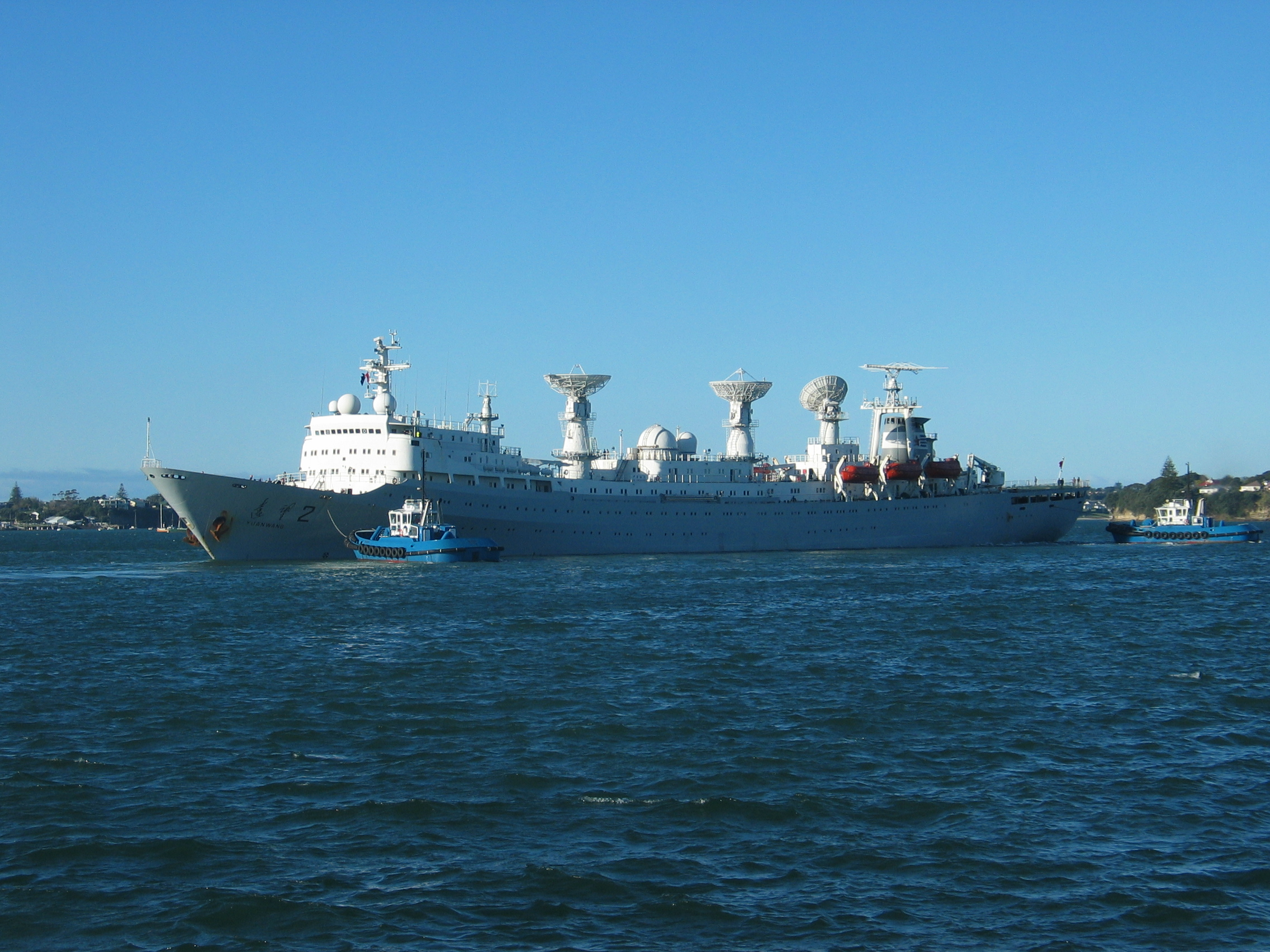
Yuanwang 2

The Chinese ships were purpose built vessels for their role in the navy and the space program.

- Yuanwang class
  - Yuanwang 1, 1977 – present
  - Yuanwang 2, 1978 – present
  - Yuanwang 3, 1995 – present
  - Yuanwang 4, 1999 – 2010
  - Yuanwang 5, 2007 – present
  - Yuanwang 6, 2007 – present
- Liaowang 1, 2023 – present

=== French Navy ===
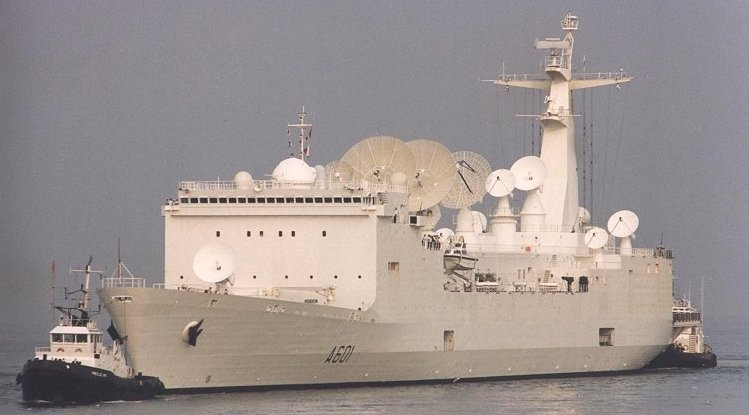
The Monge (A601) of the French Navy, 1999

Inactive

- Henri Poincaré, 1964–1992 — ex-Italian oil tanker

Active

- Monge, 1992–present

=== Indian Navy ===
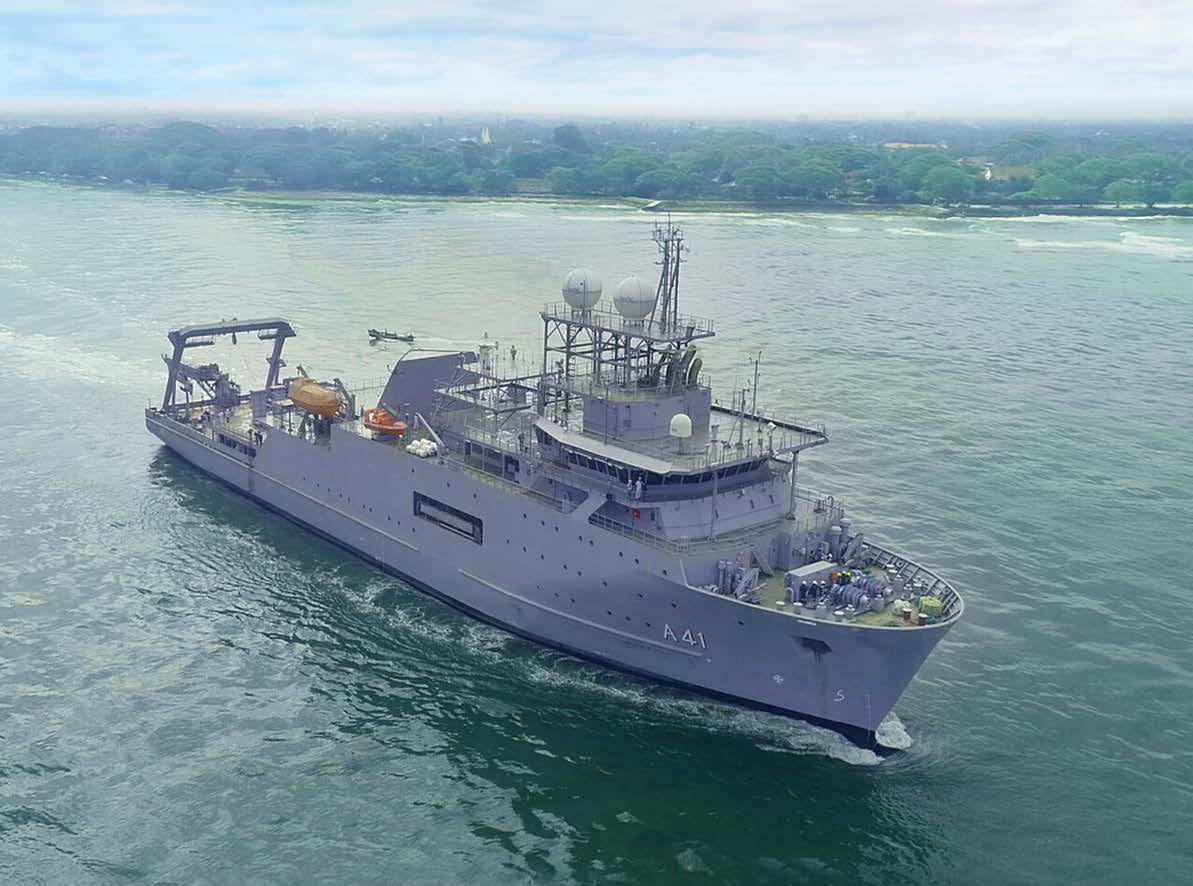
INS Anvesh (A41) of the Indian Navy

- INS Dhruv, 2021–present
- INS Anvesh, 2022–present

=== Pakistan Navy ===
- PNS Rizwan, 2023–present

=== Soviet and Russian Navy ===
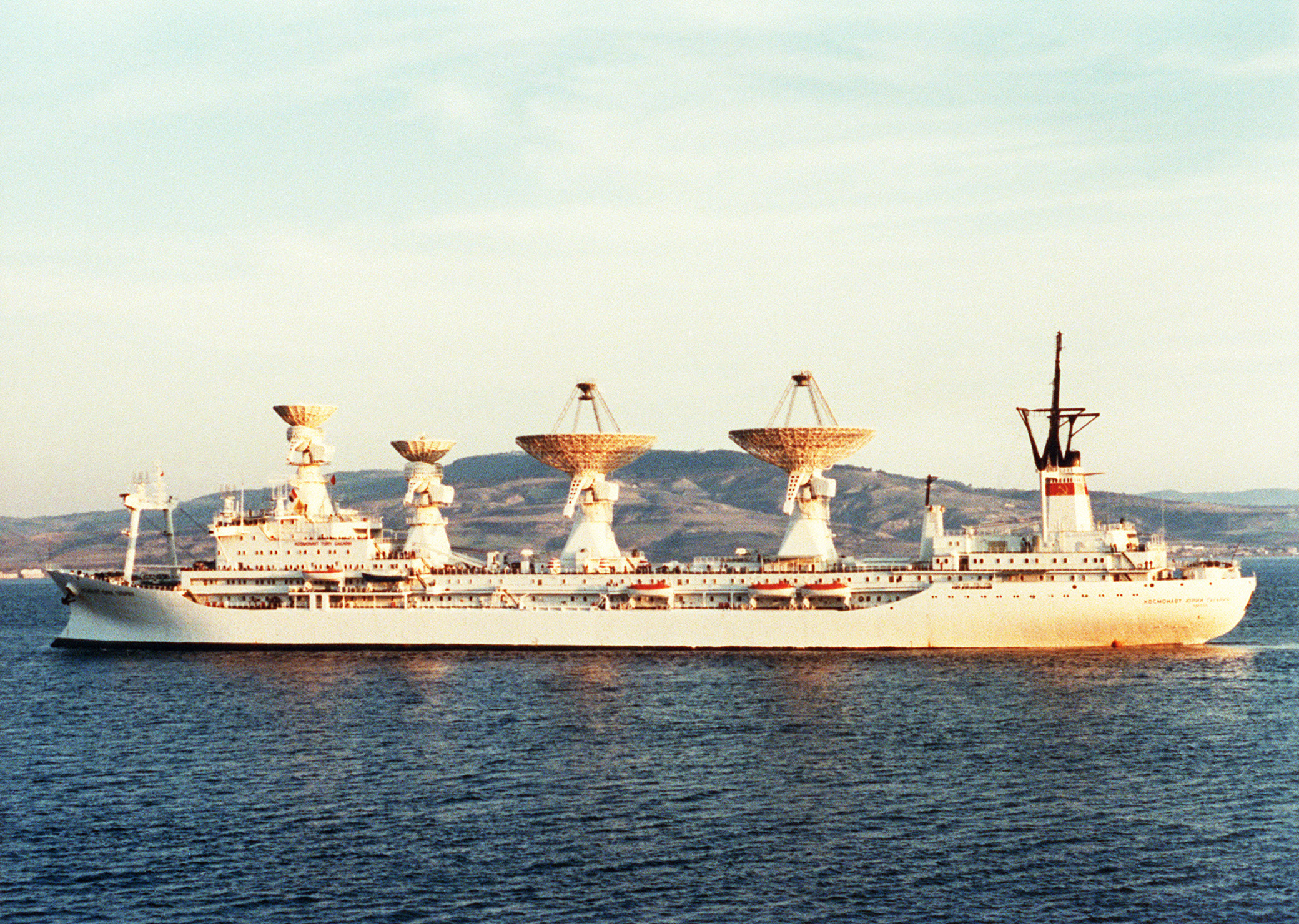
Kosmonavt Yuri Gagarin underway, 1987

The Soviet and later Russian ships were purpose built vessels for their role.

- Kosmonaut Vladimir Komarov, 1966–1989 (scrapped)
- Akademik Sergei Korolev, 1970–1996 (scrapped)
- Kosmonavt Yuri Gagarin, 1971–1996 (scrapped)
- Kosmonavt Viktor Patsaev, 1978–2001 (museum attraction)
- Kosmonavt Georgy Dobrovolsky, 1978–2006 (scrapped)
- Kosmonavt Pavel Belyaev, 1977–2000 (scrapped)
- Kosmonavt Vladislav Volkov, 1977–2000 (scrapped)
- Morzhovetz, 1967–1989 (scrapped)
- Nevel, 1967–1989 (scrapped)
- Borovitchi, 1967–1989 (scrapped)
- Kegostrov, 1967–1989 (scrapped)
- SSV-33 Ural, 1989–2001 (scrapped)
- Marshal Nedelin, 1984–2000 (scrapped)
- Marshal Krylov, 1990

=== United States Navy/United States Air Force ===
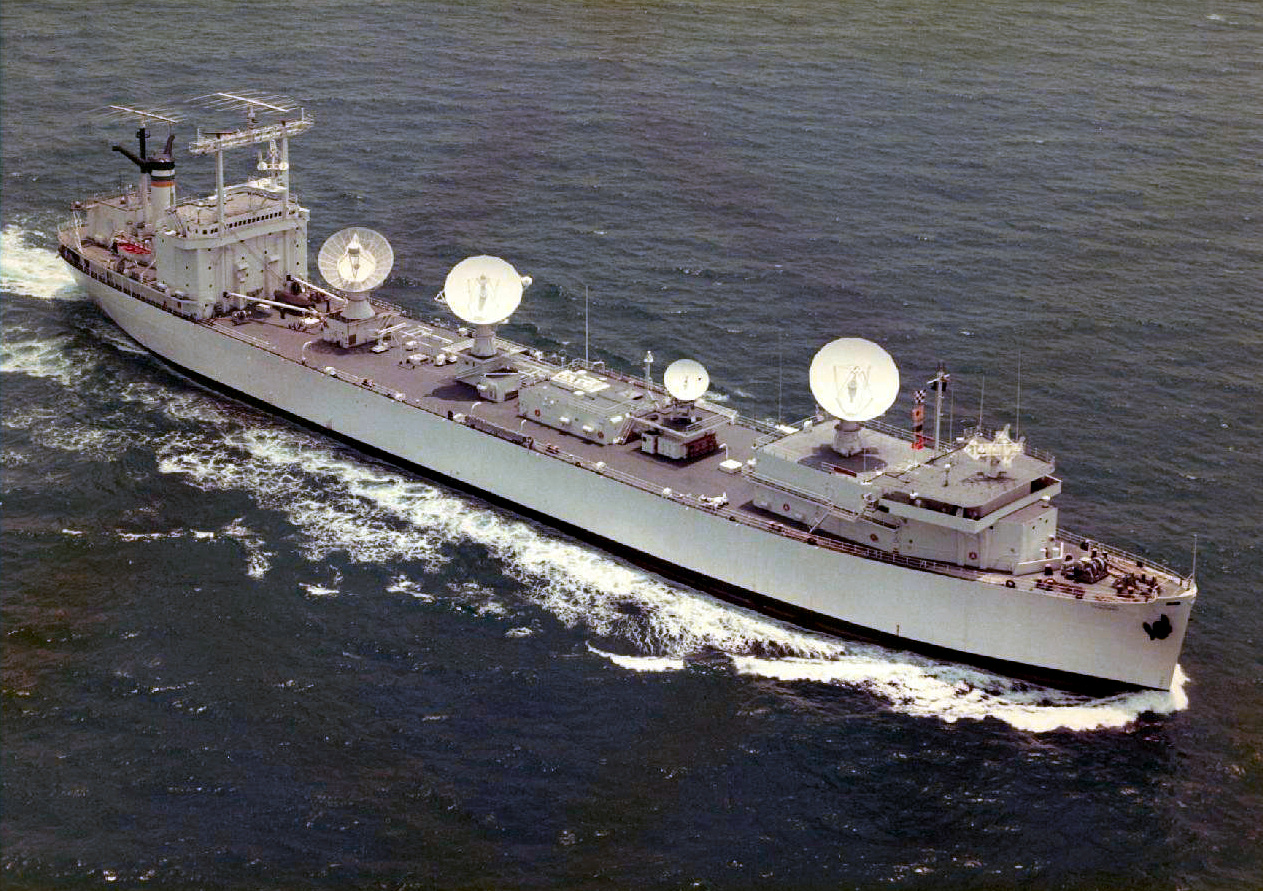
USNS Vanguard underway

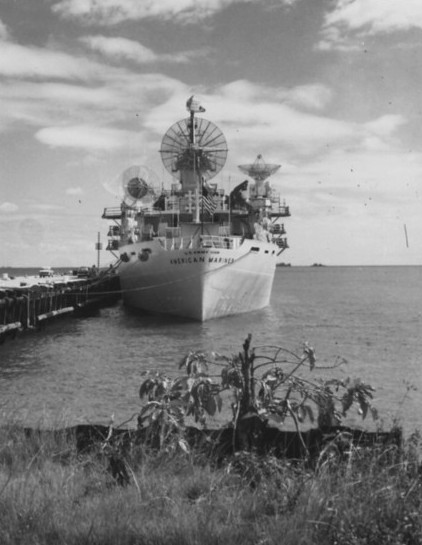
U.S. Army tracking ship (1958–1964) USAS American Mariner docked at Chaguaramus, Trinidad

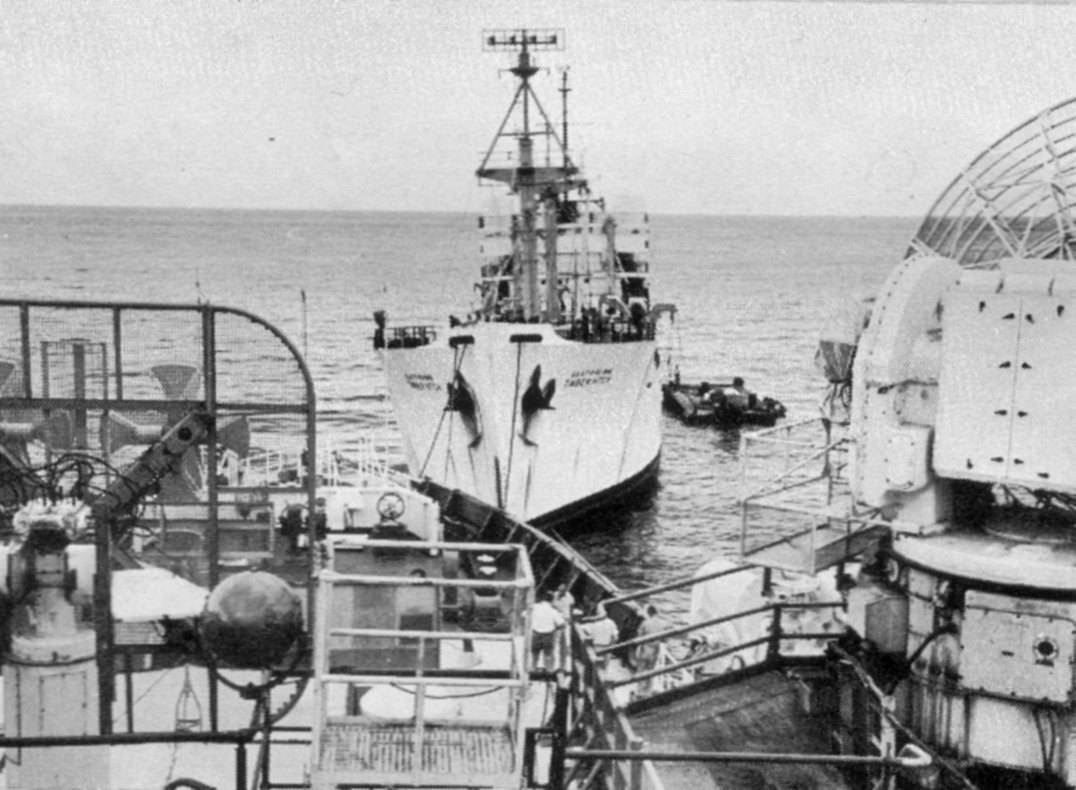
Timber Hitch being supplied with additional fresh water from USAS American Mariner, December 1961

There are currently only two active Instrumentation Ships in the U.S. Navy inventory: USNS Invincible (T-AGM-24) and USNS Howard O. Lorenzen (T-AGM-25). The former is now in the inactive fleet. The latter was delivered in January 2012 to replace USNS Observation Island (T-AGM-23) in 2014. Most of the USN and USAF tracking ships were converted into their role. Some ships were in service with NASA.

==== Inactive ====
- USNS Range Tracker (T-AGM-1), 1961–1969 - built as Victory ship (transport/freighter)
- USNS Range Recoverer (T-AGM-2), 1960–1972 - built for US Army
- USNS Longview (T-AGM-3), 1959–1976? - built as Victory ship
- USNS Richfield (T-AGM-4), 1960–1968 - built as Victory ship
- USNS Sunnyvale (T-AGM-5), 1960–1974 - built as Victory ship
- USNS Watertown (T-AGM-6), 1960–1972 - built as Victory ship
- USNS Huntsville (T-AGM-7), 1960–1974 - built as Victory ship
- USNS Wheeling (T-AGM-8), 1962–1990 - built as Victory ship
- USNS General H. H. Arnold (T-AGM-9), 1961–1982 - built as C4 class troop ship
- USNS General Hoyt S. Vandenberg (T-AGM-10), 1963–1983 - built as C4 class troop ship
- USNS Twin Falls (T-AGM-11), 1964–1972 - built as Victory ship
- USNS American Mariner (T-AGM-12), 1959–1966 - built as Liberty ship (transport/freighter), US Coast Guard training ship
- USNS Sword Knot (T-AGM-13), 1950s–1982 - C1-M cargo ship built for US Maritime Commission
- USNS Rose Knot (T-AGM-14), 1950s–1969 - C1-M cargo ship
- USNS Coastal Sentry (T-AGM-15), 1950s–1972 - C1-M cargo ship
- USNS Coastal Crusader (T-AGM-16), late 1950s–1976 - C1-M cargo ship
- USNS Timber Hitch (T-AGM-17), 1964–1969 - C1-M cargo ship
- USNS Sampan Hitch (T-AGM-18), 1964–1973 - C1-M cargo ship
- USNS Vanguard (T-AGM-19), 1964–1999 - built as Type T2-SE-A2 tanker
- USNS Redstone (T-AGM-20), 1964–1993 - built as Type T2-SE-A2 tanker
- USNS Mercury (T‑AGM‑21), 1964–1974? - built as Type T2-SE-A2 tanker
- USNS Range Sentinel (T-AGM-22), 1969–1974 - USN Haskell-class attack transport (Victory ship variation) Sherburne (APA-205)
- USNS Observation Island (T-AGM-23), 1977–2014 - built as "Mariner" class merchant ship
- SS Pacific Tracker, a U.S. Maritime Administration Ready Reserve Force tracking ship - built as crane ship.

==== Active ====
- USNS Waters (T-AGS-45), 1991–present
- USNS Invincible (T-AGM-24), 2000–present - built as ocean surveillance ship
- USNS Howard O. Lorenzen (T-AGM-25), 2012–present - purpose built to replace Observation Island.
- Pathfinder-class survey ships (T-AGS 60–66), 1994–present

== See also ==
- Eastern Range
- List of ships of the United States Air Force
- List of auxiliaries of the United States Navy § Missile Range Instrumentation Ships (T-AGM)
- Sea-Based X-Band Radar
- Western Launch and Test Range
