= USNS Coastal Sentry =

United States Navy cargo ship and missile tracker (1945–1968)

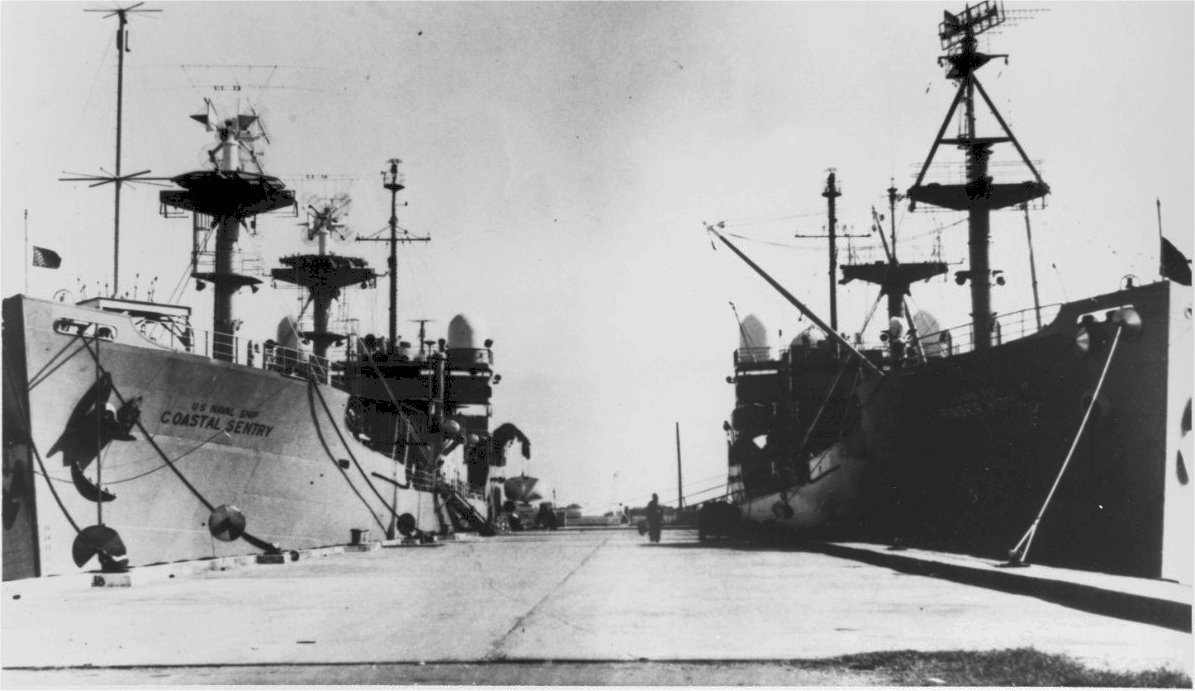
- Coastal Sentry (left) and USNS Timber Hitch (T-AGM-17) docked together during the 1960s

History

United States
- Name: Somerset
- Namesake: Somerset County, Maine, Somerset County, Maryland, Somerset County, New Jersey, and; Somerset County, Pennsylvania
- Ordered: as type (C1-M-AV1) hull, MC hull 2166
- Builder: Leathem D. Smith Shipbuilding Company, Sturgeon Bay, Wisconsin
- Yard number: 332
- Laid down: 9 October 1944
- Launched: 21 January 1945
- Sponsored by: Mrs. Fred Bradley
- Acquired: 20 September 1945
- Commissioned: delivered to the War Shipping Administration (WSA) prior to commissioning
- Stricken: 5 December 1945
- Identification: Hull symbol: AK-212; Code letters: NKOK
- Fate: delivered to WSA for use by the US Army, 2 November 1945

United States
- Name: Coastal Sentry
- Operator: WSA
- Acquired: 2 November 1945
- In service: 2 August 1946
- Out of service: 28 September 1949
- Fate: declared surplus, 12 December 1949 and transferred to the Military Sea Transportation Service MSTS

United States
- Name: Coastal Sentry
- Operator: MSTS
- In service: 15 November 1951
- Out of service: 28 September 1956
- Fate: acquired by the USAF, 29 March 1957

United States
- Name: Coastal Sentry
- Operator: USAF
- Acquired: 29 March 1957
- Refit: as a Missile Range Instrumentation Ship
- Identification: Hull symbol: AGM-15
- Fate: reacquired by the USN, 1 July 1964

United States
- Name: Coastal Sentry
- Operator: MSTS
- Acquired: 1 July 1964
- Out of service: 11 July 1968
- Stricken: 9 October 1969
- Identification: Hull symbol: T-AGM-15; Code letters: CSQ
- Fate: returned to MARAD and sold for scrap, 11 July 1968

General characteristics
- Class & type: Alamosa-class cargo ship; Coastal Sentry-class Missile range instrumentation ship
- Type: C1-M-AV1
- Tonnage: 5,032 long tons deadweight (DWT)
- Displacement: 2,382 long tons (2,420 t) (standard); 7,450 long tons (7,570 t) (full load)
- Length: 388 ft 8 in (118.47 m)
- Beam: 50 ft (15 m)
- Draft: 21 ft 1 in (6.43 m)
- Installed power: 1 × Nordberg, TSM 6 diesel engine; 1,750 shp (1,300 kW)
- Propulsion: 1 × propeller
- Speed: 11.5 kn (21.3 km/h; 13.2 mph)
- Capacity: 3,945 t (3,883 long tons) DWT; 9,830 cu ft (278 m^{3}) (refrigerated); 227,730 cu ft (6,449 m^{3}) (non-refrigerated)
- Complement: 15 Officers; 70 Enlisted
- Armament: 1 × 3 in (76 mm)/50 caliber dual purpose gun (DP); 6 × 20 mm (0.8 in) Oerlikon anti-aircraft (AA) cannons

USS Somerset (AK-212) was an Alamosa-class cargo ship that was constructed for the US Navy during the closing period of World War II. She was later acquired by the US Army in 1946 and the US Air Force in 1957 before being reacquired by the USN as the USNS Coastal Sentry (T-AGM-15), a missile range instrumentation ship.

== Construction ==
The third ship to be so named by the Navy, Somerset was laid down on 9 October 1944, under US Maritime Commission (MARCOM) contract, MC hull 2166, by the Leathem D. Smith Shipbuilding Company, Sturgeon Bay, Wisconsin; launched on 21 January 1945; sponsored by Mrs. Fred Bradley, wife of the Michigan congressman. Initially earmarked to be crewed by the US Coast Guard, Somerset was completed at her building yard on 19 February 1945. After she successfully completed her MARCOM acceptance trials, a Navy sub-board of inspection and survey recommended preliminary acceptance on 22 February 1945.

== US Navy service ==
Broken-down for the voyage via inland waterways, the ship arrived at New Orleans, Louisiana, on 2 May 1945, to be transferred to Pendleton Shipyards at New Orleans for reassembly. Accepted by the Navy on 20 September 1945 within a month of the Japanese surrender, Somerset began the conversion process to a cargo ship on 24 September. Ironically, her prospective commanding officer reported on 28 September that progress of the work was proceeding satisfactorily and that crew deficiencies caused by demobilization had been corrected, when, that same day, 28 September, the ship was earmarked for return to the MARCOM. Her assignment to the US Pacific Fleet was cancelled on 29 September. Her estimated commissioning date had been 15 October. Redelivered to the War Shipping Administration (WSA) at 1500 on 2 November 1945, Somerset was stricken from the Navy Register on 5 December 1945 never having been commissioned.

== War Shipping Administration ==
On the same day the WSA received the cargo vessel, renamed Coastal Sentry, that agency transferred her to the Stockard Steamship Company at New Orleans. Transferred again, to the War Department, on 2 August 1946 at Baltimore, Maryland., the ship entered the Reserve Fleet, berthed at Suisun Bay, California, on 28 September 1949, with the US Army retaining her title. On 12 December 1949, however, Coastal Sentry was declared surplus.

== Merchant service ==
The ship resumed commercial operation under the house flag of the Matson Navigation Company on 15 November 1951. Returned to the Reserve Fleet, this time at Astoria, Oregon, on 17 February 1954, Coastal Sentry was taken out of reserve status on 10 May 1955 to be operated by the West Coast Trans-Oceanic Steamship Line for the Military Sea Transportation Service (MSTS). Another stint of inactivity followed, 19 October 1955 – 22 May 1956, after which she again served under MSTS, this time with the Coastwise Line.

== US Air Force service ==
Placed in reserve at Olympia, Washington, on 28 September 1956, Coastal Sentry was taken out of the Reserve Fleet on 29 March 1957. Retaining her name, she was operated by the US Air Force as a missile range instrumentation ship (AGM). Reacquired by the Navy on 1 July 1964 and reinstated on the Naval Vessel Register, Coastal Sentry was designated as T-AGM 15.

== NASA service ==
Along with Rose Knot, Coastal Sentry not only collected and relayed radio telemetry information from on board spacecraft, but operated in the command-control role, having embarked National Aeronautics and Space Administration (NASA) flight controllers. As an example of that work, Coastal Sentry initiated the necessary re-entry command signals on the Gemini VIII mission when the capsule had to make an emergency landing in the Pacific on 17 March 1966. For the Gemini Program, she served as a primary tracking station, call sign CSQ, in the western Pacific.

Transferred to the Maritime Administration (the successor of MARCOM) on 11 July 1968, the ship was delivered the same day to Fuji Marden and Co of Hong Kong, British Crown Colony, at Fremantle, Australia, for scrapping. Coastal Sentry was stricken from the Naval Vessel Register on 9 October 1969.

== Notes ==
Citations

== Bibliography ==
Online resources

- Cressman, Robert J. (30 June 2015). "Coastal Sentry (T-AGM 15)". Dictionary of American Naval Fighting Ships. Naval History and Heritage Command. This article incorporates text from this source, which is in the public domain.
- "C1 Cargo Ships". www.ShipbuildingHistory.com. 28 August 2009.
- "Somerset (AK-212)". NavSource. 24 June 2011.
- "Coastal Sentry". United States Department of Transportation. Archived from the original on 31 May 2016.
- "To Sponsor Somerset". Daily Globe. Ironwood, Michigan. 22 January 1945. p. 7. "Mrs. Fred Bradley, wife of Congressman Fred Bradley of Rogers City ... Bradley is a member of the merchant marine and fisheries committee."
- Hacker, Barton C.; Grimwood, James M. (1977). "NASA SP-4203: On the Shoulders of Titans – Appendix F". NASA.
