= Pan American Airways Guided Missile Range Division =

Pan American Airways Guided Missile Range Division (PAA GMRD) was a distinct division of Pan American World Airways in the period 1950-1980, responsible as prime contractor of the U.S. Air Force Eastern Test Range, based out of Patrick Air Force Base, Florida. It was responsible for providing operations and maintenance for the Eastern Test Range, but subcontracted operation and maintenance of electronic equipment, such as missile tracking radars on the test range tracking ships and stations to the Missile Test Project of RCA Service Company (RCAS).

PAA GMRD operated under the direction of the U.S. Air Force, and retained operational offices within Patrick Air Force Base at what was then called the Tech Lab and at Building 423, and had administrative offices in Cocoa Beach, at 750 South Orlando Avenue.

Operational and technical personnel requiring travel to downrange sites boarded U.S. Air Force Military Air Transport Service (MATS) aircraft at Hangar 800 on Patrick Air Force Base. Travel by propeller-driven MATS planes was slow at the time. For example, travel by MATS to the South Atlantic Ocean tracking site at Ascension Island required three days of travel: Patrick Air Force Base to Suriname, with an overnight stay, then on to Recife, Brazil, with another overnight stay, and then, finally, the flight from Recife to Ascension Island. If traveling personnel were assigned to a tracking vessel awaiting their arrival in the Ascension Island area, it was necessary to then travel from Clarence Bay at Ascension Island to the vessel by means of motor whaleboat, barge, or other type of small craft, depending on boat schedule and sea condition.

Personnel returning from downrange passed through customs at the same hangar.

== See also ==
- Pan American World Airways
- Eastern Test Range
- Western Test Range
- Missile Test Project
- Patrick Space Force Base
- List of ships of the United States Air Force
