= List of earth stations in Australia =

A number of historic and current Earth (or ground) stations in Australia are used to communicate and track human-made satellites. Many of the sites are associated with overseas government partnerships established generally with the United States, European Union, and Japan. They are generally run by various Australian Government agencies along with NASA, European Space Agency or the US Military.

== List of sites ==
No.	Station	Complex	Location	Overseas country/company involved	Purpose	Active
1	Island Lagoon Tracking Station	Island Lagoon Tracking Station	Woomera, SA	United States	Minitrack Radio Tracking Station; Baker-Nunn Camera Optical Tracking Station. Project Mercury Radio Tracking Stations; Deep Space Probe Radio Tracking Station (85 foot diameter antenna)	No
2	Joint Defense Facility Nurrungar	Island Lagoon Tracking Station	Arcoona, SA	United States	Space based surveillance. Moved to Pine Gap	No
3	Muchea Tracking Station	Muchea Tracking Station	Muchea, WA	United States	Project Mercury (replaced by Carnarvon)	No
4	(Unknown) Adelaide Earth Station	(Unknown) Adelaide Earth Station	Adelaide, SA	United States	Unknown transit Navigational Satellite Program for weather facilities - required an Earth station near Adelaide.	Unknown
5	Canberra Deep Space Communication Complex	Canberra Deep Space Communication Complex	Tidbinbilla, ACT	United States	NASA Deep Space Network	Yes
6	Carnarvon Tracking Station	Carnarvon Earth Stations	Carnarvon, WA	United States	Tracking and Data Acquisition Station for uncrewed scientific and crewed satellites	No
7	OTC Satellite Earth Station Carnarvon	Carnarvon Earth Stations	Carnarvon, WA	Europe	European Space Agency - Space vehicle tracking	Yes
8	(Unknown) Darwin Earth station	(Unknown) Darwin Earth station	Darwin, NT	United States	Unknown Mobile Data Acquisition Station for uncrewed scientific satellites and space vehicles. Possibly Shoal Bay Receiving Station	Unknown
9	Honeysuckle Creek Tracking Station	Honeysuckle Creek Tracking Station	Honeysuckle Creek, ACT	United States	Tracking and Data Acquisition Station, primarily for support of crewed flight	No
10	Cooby Creek Tracking Station	Cooby Creek Tracking Station	South of Toowoomba, QLD	United States	Applications Technology Satellite (ATS) facility	No
11	Parkes CSIRO Earth Station	Parkes CSIRO Earth Station	Parkes, NSW	CSIRO	CSIRO, NASA Deep Space Network.	Yes
12	Orroral Valley Tracking Station	Orroral Valley Tracking Station	Orroral Valley, ACT	United States France	Spacecraft Tracking and Data Acquisition Network, DORIS (geodesy)	No
13	Yatharagga	Yatharagga West Australian Space Centre	Near Yarragadee, WA	United States France	NASA Mobile Laser Ranging Facility and DORIS (geodesy) beacon - now operated by the Swedish Space Corporation	Yes
14	Pine Gap	Pine Gap	Near Alice Springs, NT	United States	Tracking and Data Relay Satellite System, ECHELON, Aquacade tracking	Yes
15	Crib Point Satellite Earth Station at HMAS Cerberus Naval Base	Crib Point Satellite Earth Station at HMAS Cerberus Naval Base	Near Crib Point, VIC	Japan	Meteorological Satellite Earth Station for Japanese and Chinese weather satellites e.g. Himawari Geostationary Meteorological Satellites.	Yes
16	New Norcia Station	New Norcia Station	New Norcia, WA	Europe	ESTRACK for the European Space Agency	Yes
17	Australian Defence Satellite Communications Station	Australian Defence Satellite Communications Station	Geraldton, WA	United States	ECHELON	Yes
18	Dongara Satellite Station	Yatharagga West Australian Space Centre	Near Yarragadee, WA	United States	Earth station Tracking and Data Relay Satellite Facility - now operated by the Swedish Space Corporation	Yes
19	Perth Station	Perth International Telecommunications Centre	Gnangara (Perth), WA	Europe	ESTRACK for the European Space Agency operated by the Overseas Telecommunications Commission (Australia) and Parkes Radiotelescope of the Commonwealth Scientific and Industrial Research	Yes
20	Regency Park Optus Earth Station	Regency Park Optus Earth Station	Regency Park, SA	Optus - SingTel, Intelsat	Intelsat Earth station with 1 tracking and 2 fixed antennae and serves as a Tracking, Telemetry & Control backup site.	Yes
21	Belrose Optus Earth Station	Belrose Optus Earth Station	Belrose, NSW	Optus - SingTel	Belrose is the key operations centre for Optus telecommunications satellite services and controls the Optus satellite fleet. Belrose Satellite Operations comprises teams for satellite control, satellite support, satellite network management, VSAT operations and Earth station support. Belrose also provides launch support and consulting services for non-Optus satellites, whose global operations encompass Norway, Sweden, Malaysia, Indonesia, Thailand and Japan. The site hosts a total of 44 antennae, 8 tracking and 36 fixed. It has 61 high power amplifiers for transmission.	Yes
22	Lockridge Optus Earth Station	Lockridge Optus Earth Station	Lockridge, WA	Optus - SingTel	The Lockridge Earth Station supports international and domestic satellite services. It is continuously staffed as a key Tracking, Telemetry & Control facility. It hosts 12 tracking and 10 fixed antennae.	Yes
23	Oxford Falls Optus Earth Station	Oxford Falls Optus Earth Station	Oxford Falls, NSW	Optus - SingTel, Intelsat	The Oxford Falls Earth Station is Optus' international gateway for voice, data and video services from international news gatherers as well as providing international communications for key Australian government departments and pay TV providers. The 8 antennas (4 tracking) at Oxford Falls are pointed to 2 Intelsat satellites, as well as New Skies and Asiasat satellites.	Yes
24	Tasmanian Earth Resources Satellite Station	Tasmanian Earth Resources Satellite Station	Hobart, TAS	Various	The Tasmanian Earth Resources Satellite Station (TERSS) was an X-band groundstation designed and built in Australia. TERSS was created by a group of partners including: CSIRO Division of Oceanography, CSIRO Office of Space Science and Applications, The University of Tasmania, The Australian Space Office, The Bureau of Meteorology, The Australian Centre for Remote Sensing (ACRES), The Australian Antarctic Division. It was active between 1995 and 2011. The site was demolished in May 2014.	No
25	Uralla Lockheed Martin Earth Station	Uralla Lockheed Martin Earth Station	Uralla, NSW	Lockheed Martin	Lockheed Martin Australia owns and operates this Earth station to provide telemetry, tracking and command services for a wide range of customers.	Yes
26	Mawson Lakes NewSat Earth Station	Mawson Lakes NewSat Earth Station	Mawson Lakes (Adelaide), SA	NewSat	12 antennas from 2.4 to 13 m in diameter, with C and Ku - band capabilities to 12 geosynchronous satellites.	Yes
27	Bassendean NewSat Earth Station	Bassendean NewSat Earth Station	Bassendean (Perth), WA	NewSat	11 antennas from 2.4 to 13 m in diameter, with C and Ku - band capabilities to 9 geosynchronous satellites.	Yes
28	Sydney BoM Earth Station	Sydney BoM Earth Station	Sydney, NSW	BoM	One or more satellite antennas that receive data either in L-band or X-band. The signals are processed by on-site computers and the ingested satellite data is distributed around Australia and internationally.	Yes
29	Melbourne BoM Earth Station	Melbourne BoM Earth Station	Melbourne, VIC	BoM	One or more satellite antennas that receive data either in L-band or X-band. The signals are processed by on-site computers and the ingested satellite data is distributed around Australia and internationally.	Yes
30	Perth WASTAC Earth Station	Perth WASTAC Earth Station	Murdoch (Perth), WA	WASTAC	There is one receiver: an L and X-band receiver at Murdoch University, Murdoch. A microwave link exists between the various WASTAC members: Bureau of Meteorology, Landgate's - Satellite Remote Sensing Services, Curtin University of Technology's - Remote Sensing and Satellite Research Group, CSIRO Space Sciences and Technology, Murdoch University, Geoscience Australia	Yes
31	Shoal Bay Receiving Station	Shoal Bay Receiving Station	Shoal Bay (Darwin), NT	ASD	17 antennas. Possibly ECHELON	Yes
32	Darwin Weather Data Earth Station	Shoal Bay Receiving Station	Shoal Bay (Darwin), NT	BoM	One or more satellite antennas that receive data either in L-band or X-band. The signals are processed by on-site computers and the ingested satellite data is distributed around Australia and internationally.	Yes
33	Casey Station	Casey Station	Casey Station (Antarctica), AAD	BoM, AAD	ANARESAT satellite communications antenna A Himawari-8 satellite tracking antenna	Yes
34	Davis Station	Davis Station	Davis Station (Antarctica), AAD	BoM, AAD	ANARESAT satellite communications antenna A Himawari-8 satellite tracking antenna	Yes
35	Mawson Station	Mawson Station	Mawson Station (Antarctica), AAD	AAD	ANARESAT satellite communications antenna	Yes
36	Macquarie Island Station	Macquarie Island Station	Macquarie Island Station (Antarctica), AAD	AAD	ANARESAT satellite communications antenna	Yes
37	Parkes CSIRO Earth Station	Parkes CSIRO Earth Station	Parkes, NSW	CSIRO	CSIRO, NASA Deep Space Network.	Yes
38	Australian Defence Satellite Communications Station	Australian Defence Satellite Communications Station	Kojarena, near Geraldton WA	United States	signals intelligence facility.	Yes
39	Mount Stromlo Observatory	Mount Stromlo Observatory	Mount Stromlo, ACT	France	DORIS (geodesy) beacon moved from Orroral Valley.	Yes
40	BLUEsat UNSW/ACSER Groundstation, UNSW, Kensington	UNSW	Kensington, NSW	BLUEsat UNSW	Microsatellite Groundstation	Yes
41	Oxford Falls Telstra Earth Station (Sydney Earth Station)	Oxford Falls Telstra International Telecommunication Centre	Oxford Falls, NSW	Telstra International - Telstra,	The Oxford Falls Earth Station (Sydney Earth Station) is a Telstra International gateway for voice, data and video services. It provides diverse international and domestic services to private enterprise and Australian government departments, remote sites, mobility providers and pay TV providers. This site has 22 antennas which are pointed to a variety of satellite positions in the Asia-Pacific Region.	Yes
42	Gnangara Telstra Earth Station (Perth Earth Station)	Perth Telstra International Telecommunication Centre	Landsdale, Western Australia	Telstra International - Telstra,	The Gnangara Earth Station (Perth Earth Station) is a Telstra International gateway for voice, data and video services. It provides diverse international and domestic services to private enterprise and Australian government departments, remote sites, mobility providers and pay TV providers. This site has 20 antennas which are pointed to a variety of satellite positions in the Asia-Pacific and Indian Ocean Regions.	Yes
43	HMAS Harman	Defence Communications Station (DEFCOMMSTA) Canberra	Harman, ACT	Royal Australian Navy	Defence communications (35.3505°S 149.1994°E)	Yes
44	Optus		Hume, ACT	Optus	35.3953°S 149.1662°E	Yes
45	Telstra - Bendigo	Telstra	Bendigo, Vic	Telstra	30 Short St, Bendigo VIC 3550	Yes
46	Telstra - Hawthorn	Telstra	Hawthorn, Vic	Telstra	-37.82221719521082, 145.03660961011317	Yes

== Treaties ==
A number of treaties and other instruments associated with the stations:

Date	Country	Details	Station
7 June 1957	United States	United States Naval Research Laboratory and the Department of Supply of the Government of the Commonwealth of Australia to establish the Minitrack Radio Tracking Station at Woomera.	Island Lagoon Tracking Station
12 September 1957	United States	Smithsonian Astrophysical Observatory of the Smithsonian Institution and the Department of Supply of the Government of the Commonwealth of Australia to establish Baker-Nunn Camera Optical Tracking Station at Woomera.	Island Lagoon Tracking Station
26 February 1960	United States	The first formalised agreement between the US and Australia on Space Vehicle and Communication establishing the early tracking stations of 1957 as well as new stations at Woomera and Perth for Project Mercury, as well as a Deep Space Probe Radio Tracking Station (85 foot diameter antenna) at Woomera.	Island Lagoon Tracking Station, Muchea Tracking Station
5 June 1961	United States	Transit Navigational Satellite Program for weather facilities - required an Earth station near Adelaide.	Unknown
11 February 1963	United States	Extending the 1960 agreement to cover Carnarvon, Darwin and what would become Tidbinbilla/Orroral Valley Tracking Station for NASA Deep Space Radio Tracking.	Canberra Deep Space Communication Complex, Orroral Valley Tracking Station Carnarvon Tracking Station, Darwin Earth Station
22 October 1963	United States	Further formalisation of Tibinbilla and Orroral Valley Tracking Station for a Deep Space Radio Tracking Facility and a Wide Band Command and Data Acquisition Facility.	Canberra Deep Space Communication Complex, Carnarvon Tracking Station, Orroral Valley Tracking Station
10 February 1965	United States	Addition of a "Tracking and Data Acquisition Station, primarily for support of crewed flight, to be located near Canberra" (Honeysuckle Creek Tracking Station).	Honeysuckle Creek Tracking Station
7 December 1965	United States	Addition of an "Applications Technology Satellite (ATS) facility at Cooby Creek, Darling Downs near Toowoomba." (Cooby Creek Tracking Station)	Cooby Creek Tracking Station
26 February 1970	United States	Confirming the present sites, and adding that a 210-foot-diameter antenna shall be established at the Tidbinbilla Deep Space Station	Canberra Deep Space Communication Complex
7 July 1977	Japan	Turn Around Ranging Station (unspecified) supporting the first Geostationary Meteorological Satellite (GMS or Himarwari 1)	Unspecified
27 June 1978	United States	Adding Yatharagga to US agreement.	Yatharagga
15 June 1979	Europe	Agreement between the Government of Australia and the European Space Agency for a Co-operative Space Vehicle Tracking Program	OTC Satellite Earth Station Carnarvon, Perth International Telecommunications Centre
26 May 1980	United States	Confirming the list of active sites.	no new sites
22 September 1981	Japan	Turn Around Ranging Station (unspecified) supporting Geostationary Meteorological Satellite-2 (GMS or Himarwari 2)	Unspecified - possibly Crib Point Satellite Earth Station
1 May 1985	Japan	Turn Around Ranging Station (unspecified) supporting Geostationary Meteorological Satellite-3 (GMS or Himarwari 3)	Unspecified - possibly Crib Point Satellite Earth Station
21 January 1987	Europe	Further to the agreement of 1979 identification of sites as Carnarvon (OTC Satellite Earth Station Carnarvon) and Gnangara (Perth) (Perth International Telecommunications Centre) operated by the Overseas Telecommunications Commission (Australia) and Parkes Radiotelescope of the Commonwealth Scientific and Industrial Research Organisation.	OTC Satellite Earth Station Carnarvon, Perth International Telecommunications Centre
16 November 1988	United States	Extending Pine Gap	Pine Gap
2 May 1990	United States	Update of active stations to: Canberra Deep Space Communication Complex, Yarragadee, and Alice Springs (Pine Gap)	Canberra Deep Space Communication Complex, Yatharagga, Pine Gap
8 August 1990	Japan	Agreement to support the Geostationary Meteorological Satellite-4 (GMS or Himarwari 4) through a Turn Around Ranging Station (at Crib Point Satellite Earth Station)	Crib Point Satellite Earth Station
18 October 1994	France	DORIS Beacon agreements	Yatharagga, Orroral Valley Tracking Station, Mount Stromlo Observatory
20 October 1997	Japan	Agreement to support the Geostationary Meteorological Satellite-5 (GMS or Himarwari 5) through a Turn Around Ranging Station (at Crib Point Satellite Earth Station)	Crib Point Satellite Earth Station
4 June 1998	United States	Extension of Pine Gap arrangement	Pine Gap
4 August 2000	United States	Removal of Yarragadee from the agreement.	Yatharagga
16 February 2007	United States	Agreement with the US on what would become project ECHELON at the Australian Defence Satellite Communications Station	Australian Defence Satellite Communications Station
23 August 2007	Europe	General agreement	Unspecified
25 February 2010	United States	Addition of a Tracking and Data Relay Satellite Facility at Dongara.	Dongara Satellite Station
11 January 2012	United States	Extension of 2010 agreement to 2014.	N/A
27 March 2014	United States	Extension of 2012 agreement to 2018.	N/A
