= Island Lagoon Tracking Station =

First deep space station in Australia

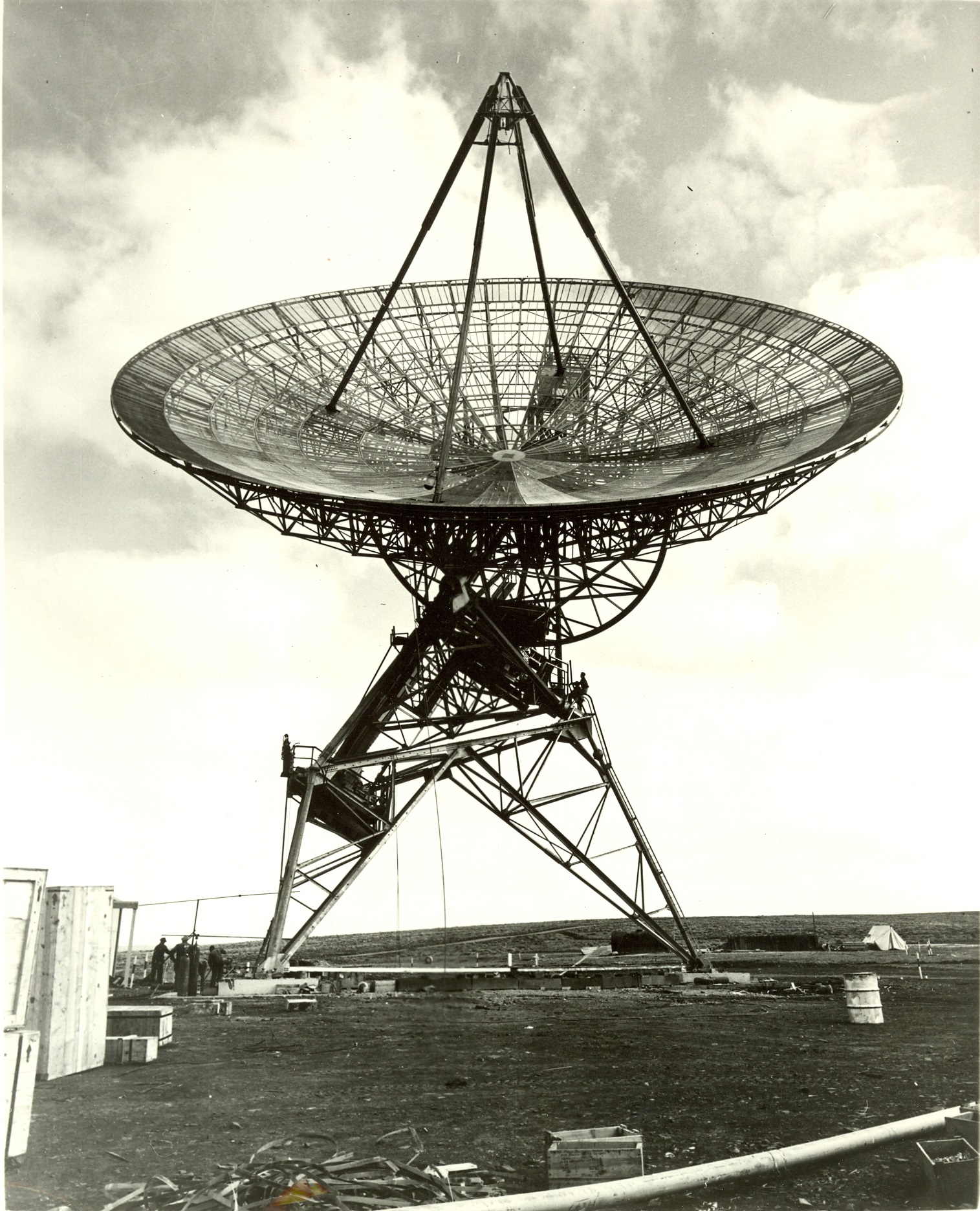
- The 26 metre antenna at the tracking station
- Alternative names: Deep Space Station 41
- Location(s): South Australia, AUS
- Coordinates: 31°22′54″S 136°53′14″E
- Diameter: 26 m (85 ft 4 in)
- Location of Island Lagoon Tracking Station
- Related media on Commons

The Island Lagoon Tracking Station (Deep Space Station 41), an Earth station in Australia, was the first deep space station to be established outside of the United States, near Woomera, South Australia in November 1960.

This area was chosen as the Australian government was working with the government of the United Kingdom on rocket and satellite research at the nearby Woomera Rocket Range.

The tracking station began as a trailer installation, and was operational in time for the International Geophysical Year of 1957. By the 1960s, the station consisted of permanent buildings and was a major unit in the network. During the American Project Mercury program, it served as station No. 9 in NASA's Manned Space Flight Network.

The station was operated by the Australian Department of Supply and provided support for deep space missions until 22 December 1972.

Subsequent tracking stations built by NASA in Australia were:

- Carnarvon, Western Australia
- Muchea, Western Australia
- Cooby Creek, Queensland
- Honeysuckle Creek, ACT
- Orroral Valley, ACT
- Tidbinbilla, ACT

== See also ==
- List of earth stations in Australia
