= Joint Defense Facility Nurrungar =

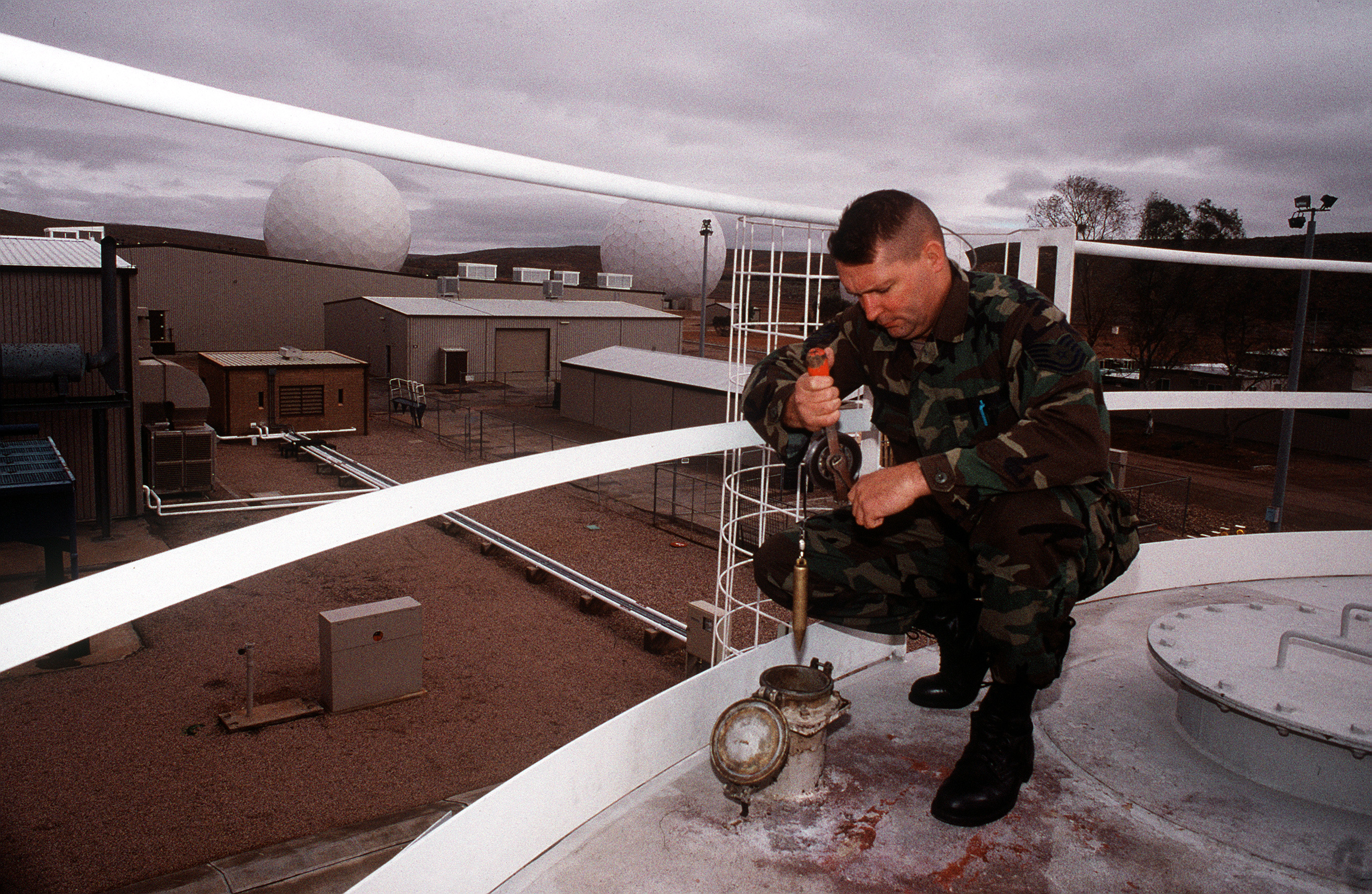
- A member of the United States Air Force conducts maintenance at Nurrungar in December 1996

- Coordinates: 31°19′30″S 136°46′34″E
- Country: Australia
- State: South Australia
- City: Arcoona

Joint Defence Facility Nurrungar (JDFN) was an Earth station in Australia located on the edge of Island Lagoon, approximately 15 km south of Woomera, South Australia, operated jointly by the Australian Department of Defence and the United States Air Force from 1969 through to 1999. Its official area of emphasis was space-based surveillance, in particular the early detection of missile launches and nuclear detonations using U.S. Defense Support Program satellites in geostationary orbits. The name Nurrungar derives from an aboriginal term meaning "listen".

== History ==
=== Cold War ===
During the Cold War the site was crucially important to America's defences, being a facility for providing "launch on warning" surveillance of enemy ICBM and other rocket launches. Not surprisingly, it was also regarded as one of the Soviets' top ten targets in the event that such an attack would actually take place.

Politically it was both a symbol of U.S.-Australian relations, and highly controversial in Australia. This was mainly due to fears that the site could prompt a nuclear attack on Australian soil, and antipathy towards the US alliance amongst the Australian political left. Political demonstrations were staged at the facility in 1989, 1991 and 1993. Despite allegations that Australians were restricted from areas crucial to the facility's intelligence gathering capabilities, Australian military personnel were fully integrated into the site's operations. The public in general was not even aware of its existence until November 1970, a full year after it had been in operation. Its precise location did not leak out until some time later.

=== Vietnam War ===
Leaked Department of Defence documents have revealed that satellites controlled by the Pine Gap and Nurrungar facilities were used to pinpoint targets for bombings in Cambodia.

=== Decommissioning ===
After September 1999 its operations were moved to the Joint Defense Facility Pine Gap, near Alice Springs, and ownership of the premises was transferred to the Woomera Test Range (headquartered in Adelaide). The ADF now uses the site occasionally for army test and evaluation work under the approval of the Woomera Test Range.

The Woomera Test Range has taken some new steps with the announcement of Project JP3024, "Remediation of the Woomera Test Range". While Nurrungar is not specifically included in that project, Army and Air Force have been jointly using the site off and on since 2009. The site is surrounded by a high-security perimeter fence and still includes one of the old (believed heritage-listed) large radome structures. The radome still has the old satellite dish inside but it is believed all the operating mechanisms have long since been stripped out and sold for scrap. "

== See also ==
- List of earth stations in Australia
