= Joint Geological and Geophysical Research Station =

Military station in Alice Springs, Australia

- Part of United States Atomic Energy Detection System
- Schwarz Crescent, Alice Springs, Northern Territory, Australia
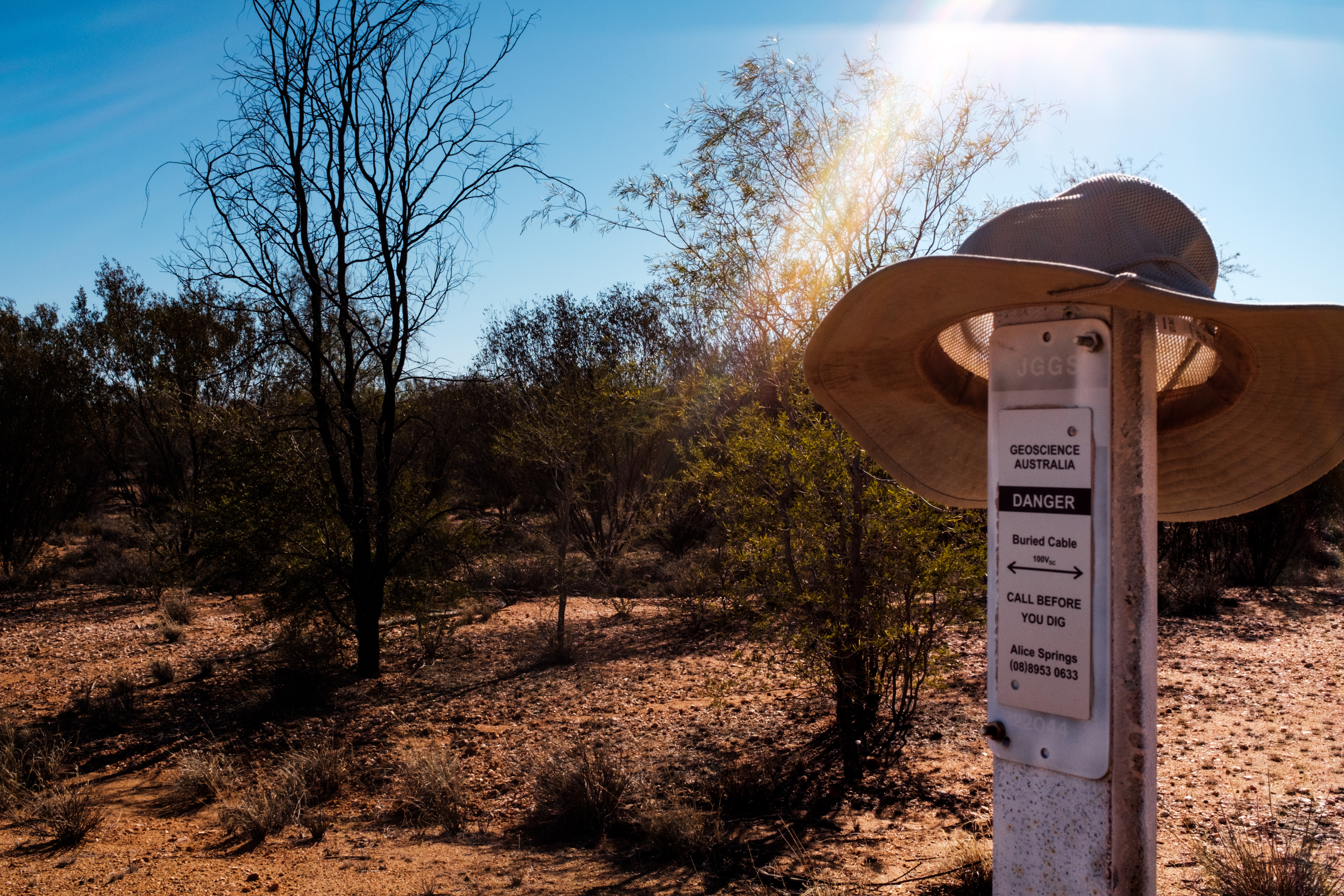
- Detachment 421 marker outside the station (2020)

Site information
- Type: Seismic monitoring and nuclear-detonation detection station
- Code: Station ID ASAR
- Owner: United States Air Force / Australian Department of Defence
- Operator: Air Force Technical Applications Center (AFTAC)
- Controlled by: United States Air Force
- Open to the public: No
- Condition: Operational
- Primary mission: Nuclear detonation detection; regional seismology

Location
- Location in the Northern Territory JGGRS (Australia)
- Coordinates: 23°41′33″S 133°53′0″E

Site history
- Built: 1955
- Built by: United States Air Force and Bureau of Mineral Resources
- In use: 1955 – present

Garrison information
- Garrison: Detachment 421, 709th Technical Maintenance Squadron

The Joint Geological and Geophysical Research Station (JGGRS) is a seismic monitoring and nuclear detonation detection system operated by the United States Air Force (USAF) in cooperation with Australia. Located at the foot of ANZAC Hill in Alice Springs, Northern Territory, it was established in 1955 as part of a global network to identify clandestine underground nuclear explosions. The station is affiliated with the Preparatory Commission for the Comprehensive Nuclear-Test-Ban Treaty Organization (CTBTO) and additionally provides seismic data to support Australian hazard-monitoring programs. It is one of several acknowledged joint U.S.–Australian military intelligence installations.

== History ==
The Joint Geological and Geophysical Research Station (JGGRS) was established in 1955 as a United States Air Force (USAF) seismic outpost for detecting clandestine nuclear weapons testing. Decades later, during the Fraser government led by Prime Minister of Australia Malcolm Fraser, the facility’s joint-operation arrangements with Australia were formalised. Former Prime Minister Bob Hawke argued that sites such as JGGRS and Pine Gap should not be cited as evidence of American nuclear deterrence unless Australia also contributed tangible support, for example by hosting the enabling infrastructure. The station was initially operated by the United States Air Force in partnership with the Australian Bureau of Mineral Resources (BMR), which later evolved into Geoscience Australia.

The BMR described JGGRS in 1990 as:

"Australian Seismological Centre within the BMR receives all of the seismic data from JGGRS over a dedicated telecom (sic) landline. These data, which are unclassified, are processed in Canberra and are used to provide information both to Australian seismologists and international seismological agencies. As well, it provides one source of seismic information used by the Australian government in its capacity to independently monitor underground nuclear explosions as a positive contribution to the attainment of a Comprehensive Test Ban Treaty (CTBT)." (BMR, pers comm, 1990).

Author Tom Gilling, writing in Project Rainfall: The Secret History of Pine Gap, was cited by Alice Springs News as warning of an “existential threat to Alice Springs” arising from the proximity of Pine Gap and JGGRS. M. R. A. Ström, in The Role of the Defence Sector in the Regional Economy of Central Australia for Australian National University, concluded that JGGRS was located for strategic rather than economic reasons and provided minimal direct benefit to the host community. It is one of four publicly acknowledged joint American-Australian military intelligence installations. The others include Joint Defence Facility Pine Gap in nearby Hugh, Naval Communication Station Harold E. Holt in Exmouth, Western Australia and the Australian Defence Satellite Communications Station (ADSCS) near Kojarena, Western Australia.

== Administration ==
Australian and U.S. officials agreed in 1978 that Bureau of Mineral Resources (BMR) personnel could take part in the station's operations, and a second Exchange of Notes in 1984 amended that agreement. In 2007 the Minister for Defence, Brendan Nelson, stated that JGGRS was "jointly operated by Geoscience Australia and the US Air Force." Richard Tanter has described the facility as nominally jointly managed by Geoscience Australia and the Air Force Technical Applications Center (AFTAC), but his field research reports that Geoscience Australia has no role in operations at the seismic station and that the facility is in practice run entirely by AFTAC's Detachment 421; United States Air Force reporting identifies Detachment 421, based near Alice Springs, as part of the 709th Technical Maintenance Squadron responsible for maintaining the station's seismic array.

== Function and design ==
JGGRS is a monitoring station for nuclear incidents used by the United States. The facility is also a comprehensive seismological observatory, recording earthquakes, volcanic eruptions and man-made explosions. Data from JGGRS is immediately transferred to American AFTAC facilities at Patrick Space Force Base in Brevard County, Florida, United States. The same stream is then forwarded to Geoscience Australia and the Comprehensive Nuclear-Test-Ban Treaty Organization (CTBTO) in Vienna, Austria.

Up to twenty boreholes exist around Schwarz Crescent; each houses a broadband seismometer buried to depths of about 30 metres (98 ft) that feed continuous waveform data to Detachment 421’s operations centre, as reported by Engineers Australia. On 3 September 2017, JGGRS detected that year's nuclear weapons test by North Korea at the Punggye-ri Nuclear Test Site, which was first detected by China at Mudanjiang.

== See also ==
- Five Eyes
- Protected areas of the Northern Territory
- United States Army Air Forces in Australia
