= Leioproctus nicholsoni =

Scientific classification
- Kingdom: Animalia
- Phylum: Arthropoda
- Clade: Pancrustacea
- Class: Insecta
- Order: Hymenoptera
- Family: Colletidae
- Genus: Leioproctus
- Species: L. nicholsoni

Binomial name
- Leioproctus nicholsoni (Cockerell, 1929)

Synonyms
- Paracolletes nicholsoni Cockerell, 1929

Species of bee

Leioproctus nicholsoni, or Leioproctus (Leioproctus) nicholsoni, is a species of bee in the family Colletidae and subfamily Colletinae. It is endemic to Australia. It was described by British-American entomologist Theodore Dru Alison Cockerell in 1929.

== Description ==
Female body length is nearly 7 mm. Colouration is mainly black, the hair is white to grey.

== Distribution and habitat ==
The species occurs in Western Australia. The type locality is Kojarena.

== Behaviour ==
The adults are flying mellivores. Flowering plants visited by the bees include Caladenia species.
