= Muchea Tracking Station =

Earth station in Australia

- Part of Manned Space Flight Network
- Muchea, Western Australia

Site information
- Type: Tracking station
- Controlled by: Weapons Research Establishment, Australian Department of Supply

Location
- Location of Muchea Tracking Station
- Coordinates: 31°36′12.24″S 115°55′49.80″E

Site history
- In use: March 1961 – February 1964

Muchea Tracking Station was an Earth station in Australia located close to Muchea in the Shire of Chittering, about 60 km (37 mi) north of Perth, Western Australia, built specifically for NASA's Project Mercury.

== History ==
Muchea was established in 1960, and became operational in March 1961. It was Station No. 8 of the 14 Manned Space Flight Network sites around the world used throughout the project. The only other Australian site was Station No. 9, the Island Lagoon Tracking Station at Woomera, South Australia. These stations were managed and operated by the Weapons Research Establishment of the Australian Department of Supply on behalf of NASA.

Muchea was equipped with a "VERy LOng Range Tracking" (VERLORT) S band radar operating between 2700 and 2900 MHz. This was an upgraded version of the SCR-584, with its range increased from 650 km (400 mi) to 4,000 km (2,500 mi), and the diameter of the dish increased from 1.8 m (5 ft 11 in) to 3 m (9 ft 10 in). It was also equipped with acquisition aid tracking systems, telemetry reception, and air-to-ground voice communications facilities. Because of its position, close to the antipodes of Cape Canaveral, it was also selected to have a command facility. Information about the range, bearing and elevation of the spacecraft was automatically relayed to the Goddard Space Flight Center by teleprinter.

During each mission a NASA team consisting of two flight controllers and a flight surgeon were sent to Muchea. The Senior Flight Controller, usually another astronaut, acted as capsule communicator (CAPCOM).

Muchea Communications Technician Gerry O'Connor became the first Australian to speak with an astronaut on 20 February 1962, when he contacted John Glenn aboard Friendship 7 on his first pass over the West Australian coast. A small plaque has been installed on the spot occupied by the Communications Technician's console which reads: "This plaque is to mark the spot where an Australian first spoke to a space traveller".

Muchea was closed in February 1964, after the end of the Mercury Project. It was replaced by the Carnarvon Tracking Station for the Gemini and Apollo projects. Although the Muchea Tracking Station no longer exists, the Shire of Chittering has erected a small display about its history.

== Missions ==
The following missions were supported by the Muchea Station:

Date	Mission	Crew	Orbits	Senior Flight Controller
13 September 1961	MA4	Unmanned	1	Scott Carpenter
29 November 1961	MA5	Enos	2	Wally Schirra
20 February 1962	MA6	John Glenn	3	Gordon Cooper
24 May 1962	MA7	Scott Carpenter	3	Deke Slayton
3 October 1962	MA8	Wally Schirra	6	Eugene Duret
15–16 May 1963	MA9	Gordon Cooper	22	Chuck Lewis

== See also ==
- List of radio telescopes
