= Yatharagga =

Area in Western Australia

Coordinates: 29.046246°S 115.3448523°E

Location in Western Australia

Yatharagga is an area associated with a homestead in the mid west of Western Australia (WA) near Yarragadee Station. It is located about 24 kilometres (15 mi) north-west of Mingenew and about 100 kilometres (62 mi) south-east of Geraldton.

The area is also associated with two Australian Earth stations and a geodetic observatory with space related tracking systems at the West Australian Space Centre.

== Homestead ==
The Yatharagga is a homestead listed by the Gazetteer of Australia.

== Yatharagga Satellite Station ==
Yatharagga Satellite Station also known as West Australian Space Centre is owned and run by the Swedish Space Corporation (SSC)'s subsidiary SSC Space Australia, and services a number of government agencies and commercial organisations. It commenced operations under SSC in 2012.

== Dongara Satellite Station ==
Dongara Satellite Station is adjacent to Yatharagga Satellite Station, and acts as mutual backup to the site. It is also part of the Swedish Space Corporation, but is owned by the US subsidiary.

== Yarragadee Geodetic Observatory ==
Near the homestead is Geoscience Australia's Yarragadee Geodetic Observatory. It hosts and operates NASA's MOBLAS 5 Satellite Laser Ranging (SLR) station originally established by an agreement between the United States of America and Australia effective 27 June 1978 to establish a NASA Temporary Mobile Satellite Laser Tracking Facility.

=== DORIS ===
Near the MOBLAS facility is a DORIS (geodesy) beacon, provided by France's CNES.

=== VLBI radio telescope ===
The site also hosts an AuScope 12m VLBI radio telescope since 2011.
