= Carnarvon Tracking Station =

Former tracking station in Western Australia

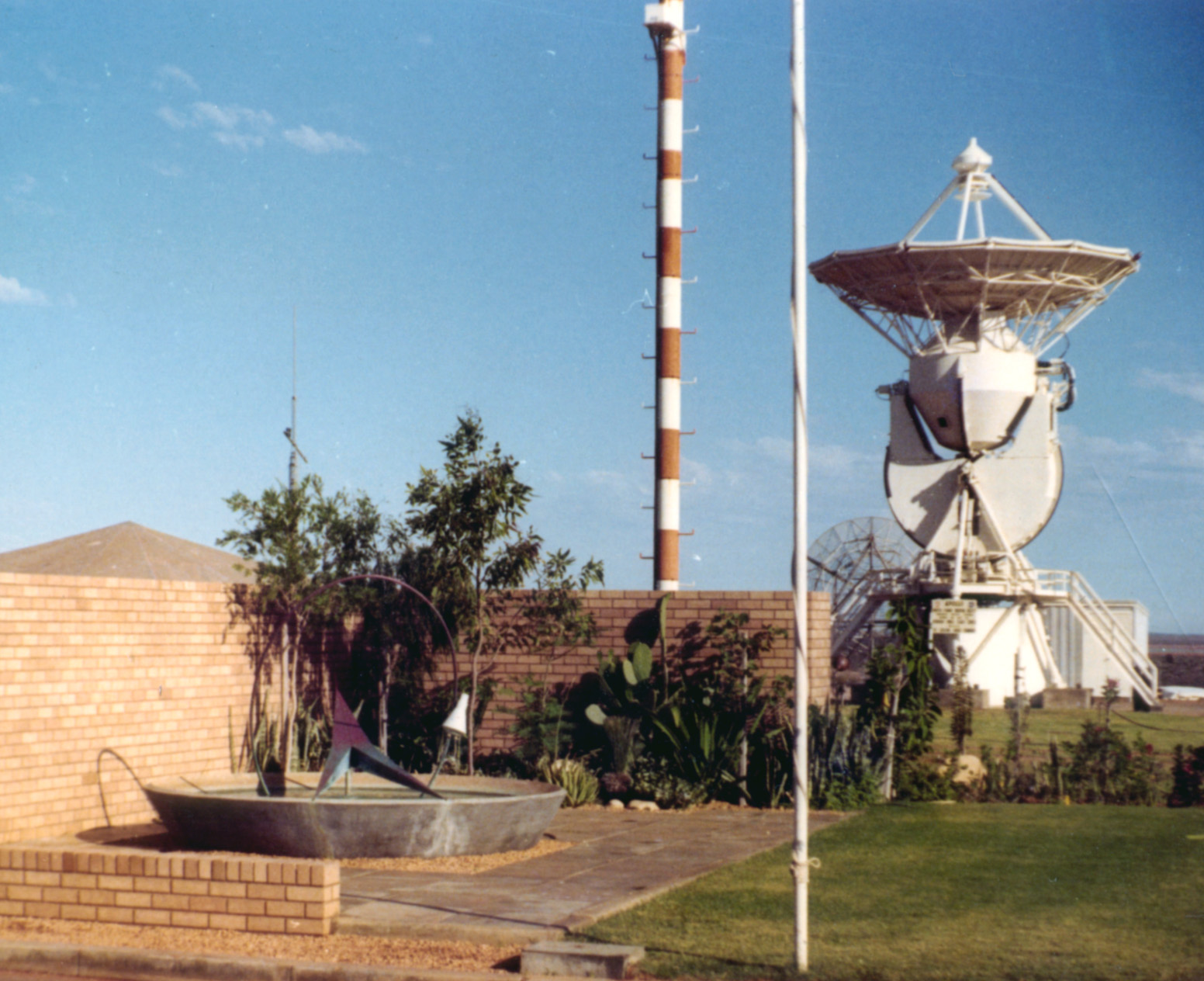
- Carnarvon NASA tracking station.
- Location(s): Western Australia, AUS
- Coordinates: 24°54′15″S 113°43′16″E
- Location of Carnarvon Tracking Station
- Related media on Commons

The Carnarvon Tracking Station was an Earth tracking station in Australia, located 10 kilometres (6.2 miles) south of Carnarvon, Western Australia. It operated from 1963 until 1975, during which it supported the Gemini, Apollo and Skylab space programs.

== History ==
The station was built in 1963 for use by NASA for the Gemini program, the second step for NASA's plan to put a human on the Moon. It replaced the Muchea Tracking Station and used some of the equipment from Project Mercury.

The station also included an FPQ-6 precision tracking radar, a Spacecraft Tracking and Data Acquisition Network (STADAN) scientific satellite tracking facility, a planet Jupiter monitoring system, and a Solar Particle Alert Network (SPAN) facility. Together, these facilities formed the largest station in the NASA network outside mainland USA.

After the conclusion of the Gemini program, the Tracking Station provided extensive support for the Project Apollo missions to the Moon. Because of Carnarvon's unique geographical position, it was used to uplink the trans-lunar injection command to the Apollo spacecraft and was the prime link for the last hours of re-entry to Earth.

To enhance critical communications between the station and the Houston Control Centre, NASA funded the establishment of the nearby OTC Satellite Earth Station Carnarvon in 1966.

After Project Apollo finished, the Tracking Station was used to support the Skylab project. When that project finished, the station ceased routine operations immediately after an Atmosphere Explorer-C satellite pass on 4 October 1974, but sufficient capability was retained for one final mission − the trans-solar insertion of Helios-A on 10 December 1974. The final closure of the gates, and the exodus of the last five staff members, took place on 18 April 1975.

The main building was then used by Radio Australia, which was looking for a home after Cyclone Tracy put its Darwin installation out of commission in December 1974. It closed this facility in June 1996. All tracking station equipment was removed and/or buried, and all buildings, with the exception of one small one now used by Telstra, were razed. Only the foundations of what is a historical site remain.

Solar scientific research, originally carried out at the Carnarvon Tracking Station, is now carried out on the adjacent OTC Satellite Earth Station site, which hosts a node of the Birmingham Solar Oscillations Network.

== Engineering heritage award ==
The station received an Engineering Heritage International Marker from Engineers Australia as part of its Engineering Heritage Recognition Program.

== See also ==
- Honeysuckle Creek Tracking Station
- Orroral Valley Tracking Station
- Canberra Deep Space Communication Complex
