= Shoal Bay Receiving Station =

Signals intelligence-gathering facility in Northern Territory, Australia

- 19 km (12 mi) from Darwin CBD in Australia

Site information
- Controlled by: Australian Signals Directorate
- Open to the public: No

Location
- Location within Northern Territory
- Coordinates: 12°21′32″S 130°58′56″E
- Area: 60 square kilometres (23 sq mi)

Shoal Bay Receiving Station is a signals intelligence-gathering facility in the Northern Territory of Australia located on the shores of Shoal Bay about 19 kilometres (12 mi) north-east of the Darwin CBD. The site is managed by the Australian Signals Directorate (ASD).

== History ==
One of the major purposes of the station has been to intercept and monitor Indonesian satellite communications and gather intelligence on the activities of the Indonesian military. The station was a major source of intelligence on the role played by the Indonesian military and associated militia groups in the violence in East Timor following the 1999 Referendum of Independence. The site may also have intercepted conversations regarding the planned murder of Australian journalists in East Timor by the Indonesian military, in 1975, prior to the killings taking place.

The site is suspected to be a part of the global SIGINT network ECHELON, operated under the UKUSA Agreement. It is also a major contributor to the U.S. National Security Agency's surveillance program codenamed XKeyscore.

== Facilities ==
As of 2005, the Shoal Bay Receiving Station operated 17 antennas.

While the ASD manages the site, it is staffed by a combination of Royal Australian Navy, Australian Army, Royal Australian Air Force and civilian personnel. As of 2007 it had a staff of 73 personnel, which was lower than the staffing of 85 personnel in 2005 and 120 to 150 personnel during the East Timor crisis in 1999.

== Bureau of Meteorology ==
The Bureau of Meteorology installed three weather satellite receiving antenna systems at Shoal Bay in October 2016 through a subcontractor, Av-Comm. According to Av-Comm, these accessed China's Feng Yun-2 series of geostationary satellites, Feng Yun 2E and Feng Yun 2G as well as Japan Meteorological Agency's HimawariCast service broadcast from a Himawari 8 Satellite.

== See also ==
- Pine Gap, near Alice Springs
- Australian Defence Satellite Communications Station, at Geraldton
- HMAS Harman, outside Canberra
- Waihopai Station
- BoM's Crib Point Satellite Earth Station at HMAS Cerberus Naval Base
