= Canberra Deep Space Communication Complex =

Interplanetary radio communication station

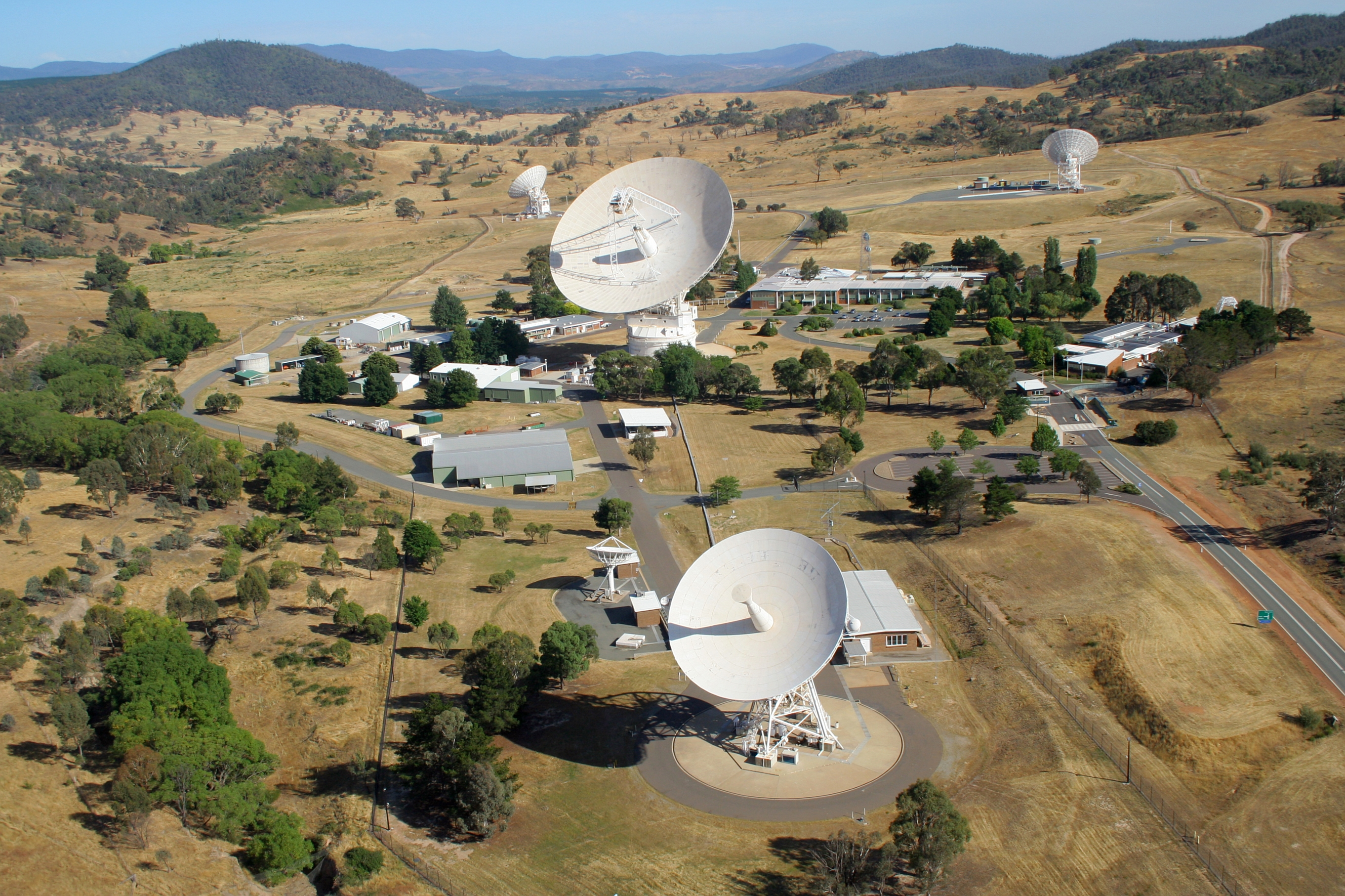
- The Canberra Deep Space Communication Complex in 2010
- Alternative names: CDSCC
- Organization: CSIRO / NASA / JPL
- Location: Tidbinbilla, Australian Capital Territory, Australia
- Coordinates: 35°24′05″S 148°58′54″E
- Altitude: 550 m (1,800 ft)
- Established: 19 March 1965
- Website: www.cdscc.nasa.gov
- Telescopes: DSS 34; DSS 35; DSS 36; DSS 43; Parkes Radio Telescope

Telescopes
- Related media on Commons

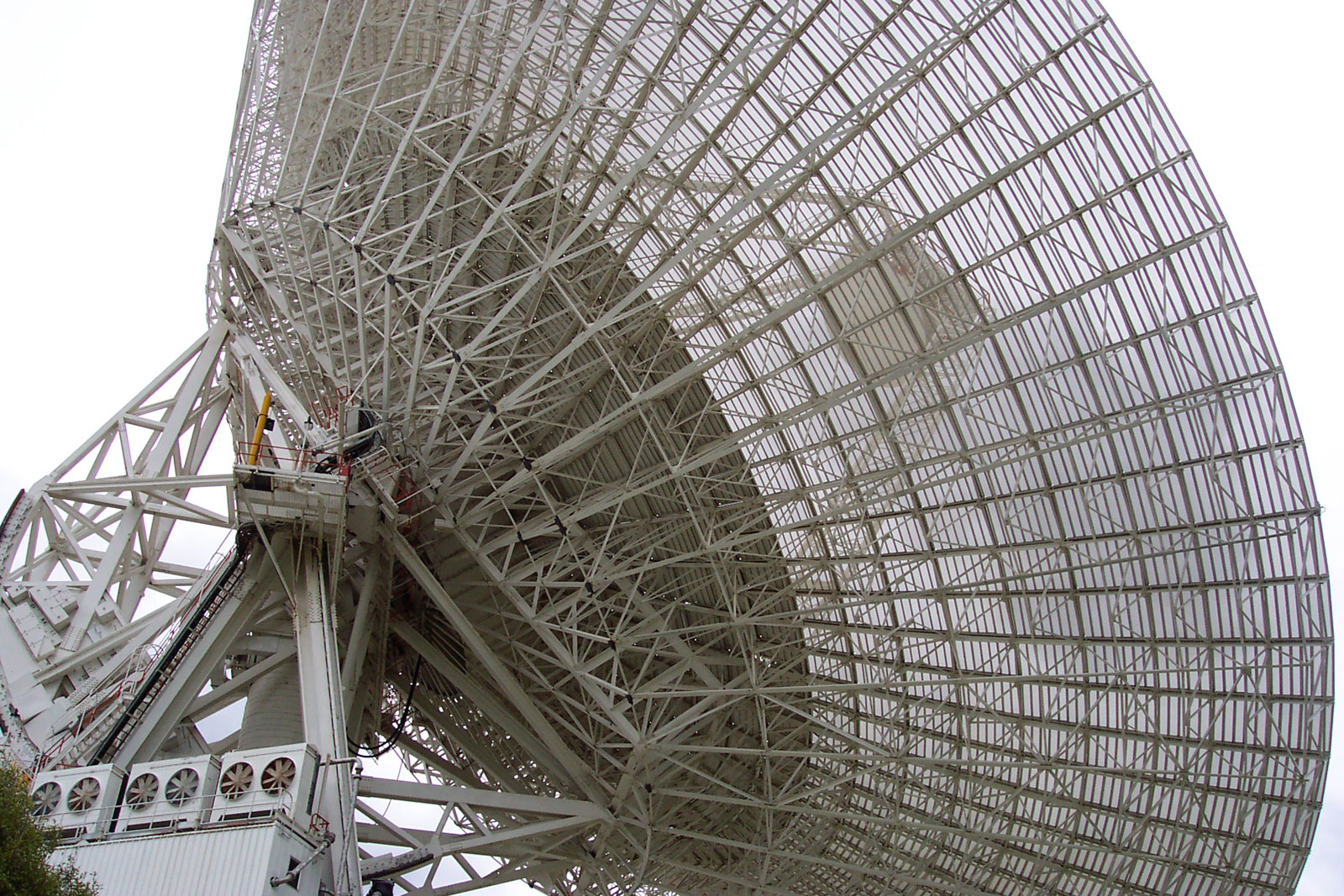
70m DSS-43 telescope at the Canberra Deep Space Communication Complex

The Canberra Deep Space Communication Complex (CDSCC) is a satellite communication station, part of the Deep Space Network of NASA's Jet Propulsion Laboratory (JPL), located at Tidbinbilla in the Australian Capital Territory. Opened in 1965, the complex was used for tracking the Apollo Lunar Module, and along with its two sister stations at Goldstone, California, and Madrid, Spain is now used for tracking and communicating with NASA's spacecraft, particularly interplanetary missions. Its DSS-43 antenna is the only antenna on Earth that can send commands to the Voyager 2 spacecraft. It is managed in Australia by the CSIRO for NASA’s Space Communications and Navigation program (SCaN) at NASA Headquarters in Washington D.C.

== Location ==
The complex is located in the Paddys River (a tributary of the Cotter River) valley, about 20 km from Canberra in the Australian Capital Territory. The complex is part of the Deep Space Network run by NASA's Jet Propulsion Laboratory (JPL). It is commonly referred to as the Tidbinbilla Deep Space Tracking Station and was officially opened on 19 March 1965 by the prime minister of Australia, Robert Menzies.

The station is separated from Canberra by the Murrumbidgee River and, more importantly, the Coolamon Ridge, Urambi Hills, and Bullen Range, which help shield the dishes from the city's radio frequency (RF) noise. Located nearby is the Tidbinbilla Nature Reserve.

== Management ==
The CSIRO manages most of NASA's activities in Australia.

In February 2010 CSIRO took over direct management of the site with the establishment of CASS (CSIRO Astronomy and Space Science). Previous to this CDSCC had been managed by external sub-contractor organisations, such as Raytheon Australia from 2003 to 2010; BAE Systems Australia 1990–2003; AWA Electronic Services -1990.

== History ==
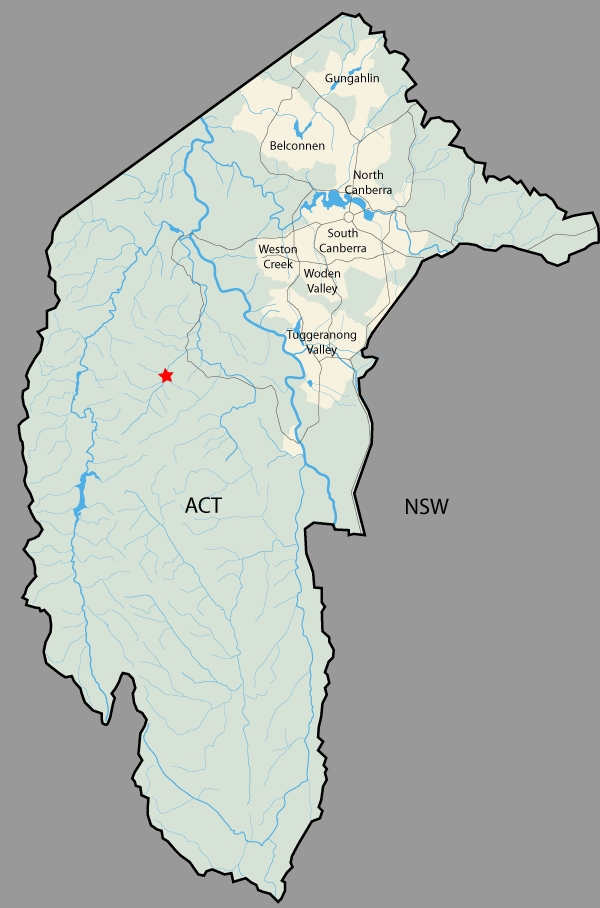
Tidbinbilla Locality Map, the site is marked with the red star.

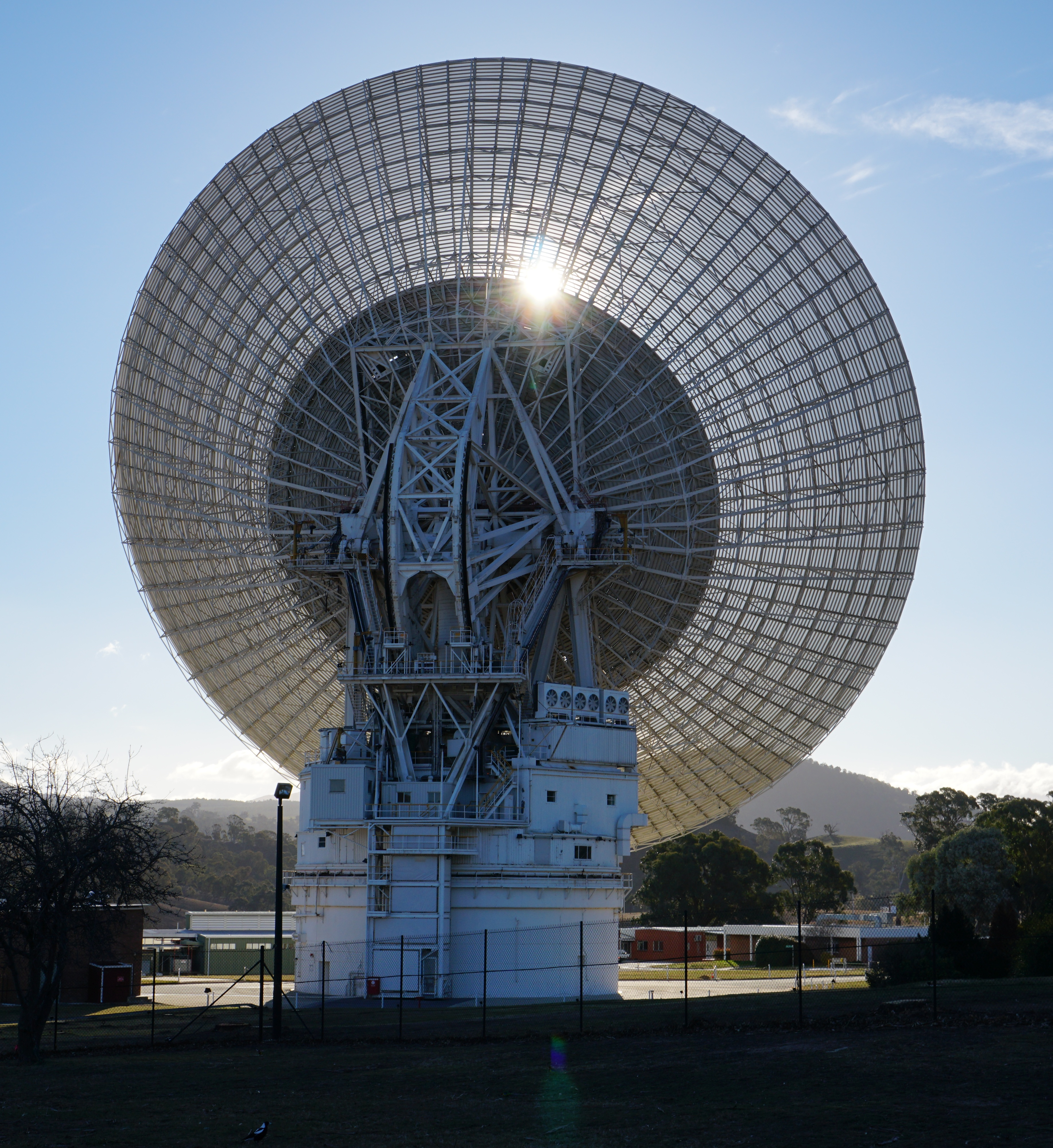
The 70m DSS-43 dish at the CDSCC

During the mid 1960s NASA built three tracking stations in the Australian Capital Territory.

- The Tidbinbilla Tracking Station (now known as CDSCC) was opened in 1965 and is the only NASA tracking station in Australia still in operation. During the Apollo program, Tidbinbilla was used for tracking the Apollo Lunar Module.
- The Orroral Valley Tracking Station (35°37′43″S 148°57′20.8″E) was opened in May 1965 in what is now part of Namadgi National Park. Its role was orbiting satellite support, although it also supported the Apollo-Soyuz Test Project in 1975. It was closed in 1985.
- Honeysuckle Creek Tracking Station (35°35′1″S 148°58′36″E) opened in 1967 and was built primarily to support the Apollo Moon missions, mainly communications with the Apollo Command Module. After the cancellation of the Apollo Project the station supported Skylab until its re-entry in 1979 when the station joined the Deep Space Network in support of the Viking and Voyager projects. 1981 saw the closure of the station and its 26 m antenna was moved to CDSCC to become known as Deep Space Station 46. After the antenna was removed the rest of the facility was dismantled and knocked down. Its foundation, access road and parking area are all that remains of the facility.

== Antennas ==
As of late 2016 the station has five large antennas, called Deep Space Stations (DSS), each identified by a number: DSS-34, DSS-35, DSS-36, DSS-43, and DSS-45. The CDSCC also uses the Parkes radio telescope in central New South Wales at busy times to receive data from spacecraft (then designated DSS-49). There has been ongoing construction since 2010 building additional 34 m beam waveguide antenna. Construction of DSS-35 began in July 2010. The station's collimation tower is located approximately 3 km to the north-west, on Black Hill.

| Photo | Name | Diameter | Date operational | Date decommissioned | Notes | Bands |
|---|---|---|---|---|---|---|
| | DSS-33 | 11m | 1996 | 2008 | Small Azimuth-Elevation-Train antenna, moved to Norway in 2008 for atmospheric research | X, S |
| | DSS-34 | 34m | 1997 | | Beam waveguide antenna, receiving/transmitting hardware underground | Transmit: X (7145-7235 MHz), S (2025-2120 MHz); Receive: X (8200-8600MHz), S (2200-2300 MHz), K (25.5-27.0 GHz), Ka (31.8-32.3 GHz), X-Band Acquisition Aid (8400-8500MHz) |
| | DSS-35 | 34m | 2014 | | Operational late 2014, officially opened March 2015. Beam waveguide antenna, receiving/transmitting hardware underground. The design uses 'night sky cooling' to cool the transmitter. | Transmit: X (7145-7235 MHz); Receive: X (8200-8600MHz), Ka (31.8-32.3 GHz) |
| | DSS-36 | 34m | 2016 | | Beam waveguide antenna, receiving/transmitting hardware underground. Dish installed August 2015, operational late 2016, officially opened November 3, 2016. | Transmit: X (7145-7235 MHz), S (2025-2120 MHz); Receive: X (8200-8600MHz), S (2200-2300 MHz), Ka (31.8-32.3 GHz) |
| | DSS-42 | 34m | 1964 | 2000 | "Hour angle/declination" antenna, original 26m antenna, later expanded to 34m, dismantled shortly after decommissioning. | |
| | DSS-43 | 70m | 1973 | | Originally 64m, enlarged 1987. Largest steerable parabolic antenna in Southern Hemisphere. Only antenna capable of communicating with Voyager 2. Weighs 3000+ tonnes, 1,272 aluminum panels. In its spare time the dish is used for radio astronomy. | Transmit: X (7145-7190 MHz), S (2090-2120 MHz; Receive: X (8183-8633 MHz), S (2270-2300 MHz), L (1610-1705 MHz), K (18.0-26.5 GHz) |
| | DSS-45 | 34m | 1986 | 2016 | Was constructed for Voyager 2 Uranus flyby. Decommissioned after DSS-36 became operational | Transmit: X(7145-7190MHz); Receive: X (8200-8600MHz), S (2200-2300MHz) |
| | DSS-44/DSS-46 | 26m | 1966 | 2009 | X-Y axes antenna. Originally HSK at Honeysuckle Creek for Apollo program. Transferred to DSN as DSS-44 in 1974, moved to CDSCC as DSS-46 in 1983. AIAA Historical Aerospace Site | Transmit: S (2025-2120MHz); Receive: S (2200-2300MHz), S-Band Acquisition Aid (2200-2300MHz), X-Band Acquisition Aid (8400-8500MHz) |
| | DSS-49 | 64m | 1961 | | Parkes Observatory radio telescope, is sometimes used to assist with DSN operations as a receiver, with no transmission capability. | |

== Funding ==
CDSCC costs about A$20 million per year to run, and is funded by NASA.

== See also ==
- Carnarvon Tracking Station
- OTC Satellite Earth Station Carnarvon
- Parkes Observatory
