= Australian Defence Satellite Communications Station =

Signals intelligence listening station in Western Australia

Coordinates: 28°41′42″S 114°50′32″E

The Australian Defence Satellite Communications Station (ADSCS), an Earth station in Australia is located at Kojarena 30 km (19 mi) east of Geraldton, Western Australia. The ADSCS is part of the US signals intelligence and analysis network ECHELON.

This Defence facility contributes to Australia's National Security and Defence. The Proposal to develop the station was announced in March 1987, work commenced on site in 1988 and was completed in 1993. The buildings, Antennas and other station facilities occupy about 26 hectares.

The surrounding buffer zone of 442 hectares is also owned by the Commonwealth and provides protection for the station against external electrical interference. The buffer zone land is farmed under license by the former land owners.

Australian Construction Services, part of the Department of Administrative Services, managed the construction of the site buildings and services. The antennas, of Australian design, were erected by a joint venture between AWA Defence Industries and Baulderstone Engineering. The site's construction workforce peaked at 170 in mid-1990.

The station has four satellite tracking dishes which intercept communications from Russian, Chinese, Japanese, Indian and Pakistani regional satellites and international communications satellites (Intelsats and COMSATs), throughout the Indian Ocean and South-East Asian regions. Staff are drawn from the U.S. National Security Agency (NSA) and the Australian Signals Directorate (ASD), and the site is operated under the UKUSA Agreement.

In 2007, after signing an agreement it was announced that an additional but separate US military communications facility would be built within the grounds of the ADSCGS. It will consist of three 19 m (62 ft) antennas and two smaller antennas making up a joint US-Australian ground station for the US Department of Defense Mobile User Objective System, a narrow-band networked satellite constellation for Ultra-High-Frequency satellite communications enabling secure all-weather and all-terrain 3-G mobile telecommunications.

== See also ==
- Joint Geological and Geophysical Research Station
