= Muchea, Western Australia =

Muchea
- Town
- Interactive map of Muchea
- Coordinates: 31°34′44″S 115°58′04″E
- Country: Australia
- State: Western Australia
- LGA: Shire of Chittering
- Location: 57 km (35 mi) N of Perth; 13 km (8.1 mi) NNW of Bullsbrook
- Established: 1904

Government
  - State electorate: Moore
  - Federal division: Durack

Area
  - Total: 215.1 km^{2} (83.1 sq mi)
- Elevation: 95 m (312 ft)

Population
  - Total: 762 (UCL 2021)
- Postcode: 6501

Muchea is a town in the Shire of Chittering, located 43 km (27 mi) north north-east of Perth. Its postcode is 6501.

The town's name comes from the Aboriginal word "Muchela" meaning 'water hole' in the Noongar language, referring to the abundance of water in the region.

== History ==
The area was first surveyed as farmland in 1845 as part of a property to be owned by George Moore.

The opening of a railway siding in the area between 1892 and 1898 by the Midland Railway caused permanent structures to be built and by 1903 farm lots were surveyed close to the siding. The opening of the railway is attributed to the change of the area's name from the original Muchela to Muchea by way of a misprint in the first train timetables which propagated to station signage. Following the establishment of the railway precinct, the townsite was later gazetted in 1904.

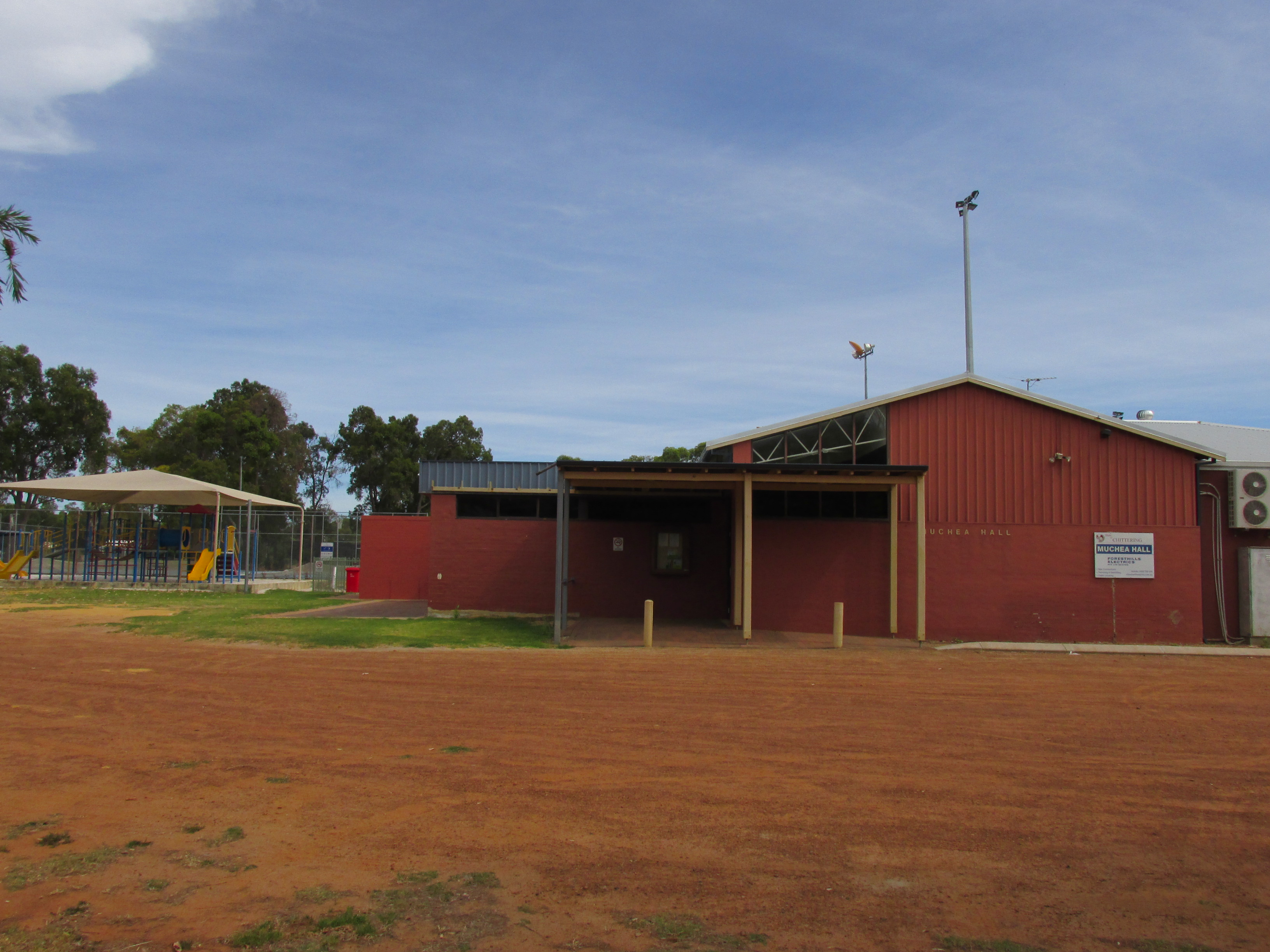
Community hall in Muchea

In 1960, the Muchea Tracking Station was established about 4 kilometres (2 mi) SSW outside of town as part of NASA's Mercury project. In 1962, the first Australian to speak with a space traveller did so from the Muchea facility. The tracking station was closed in 1964.

Western Power has a substation in the area to which a 164 MW / 905 MWh grid battery is being built.
