= Cooby Creek Tracking Station =

Earth station in Queensland, Australia

Coordinates: 27°23′46″S 151°56′20″E

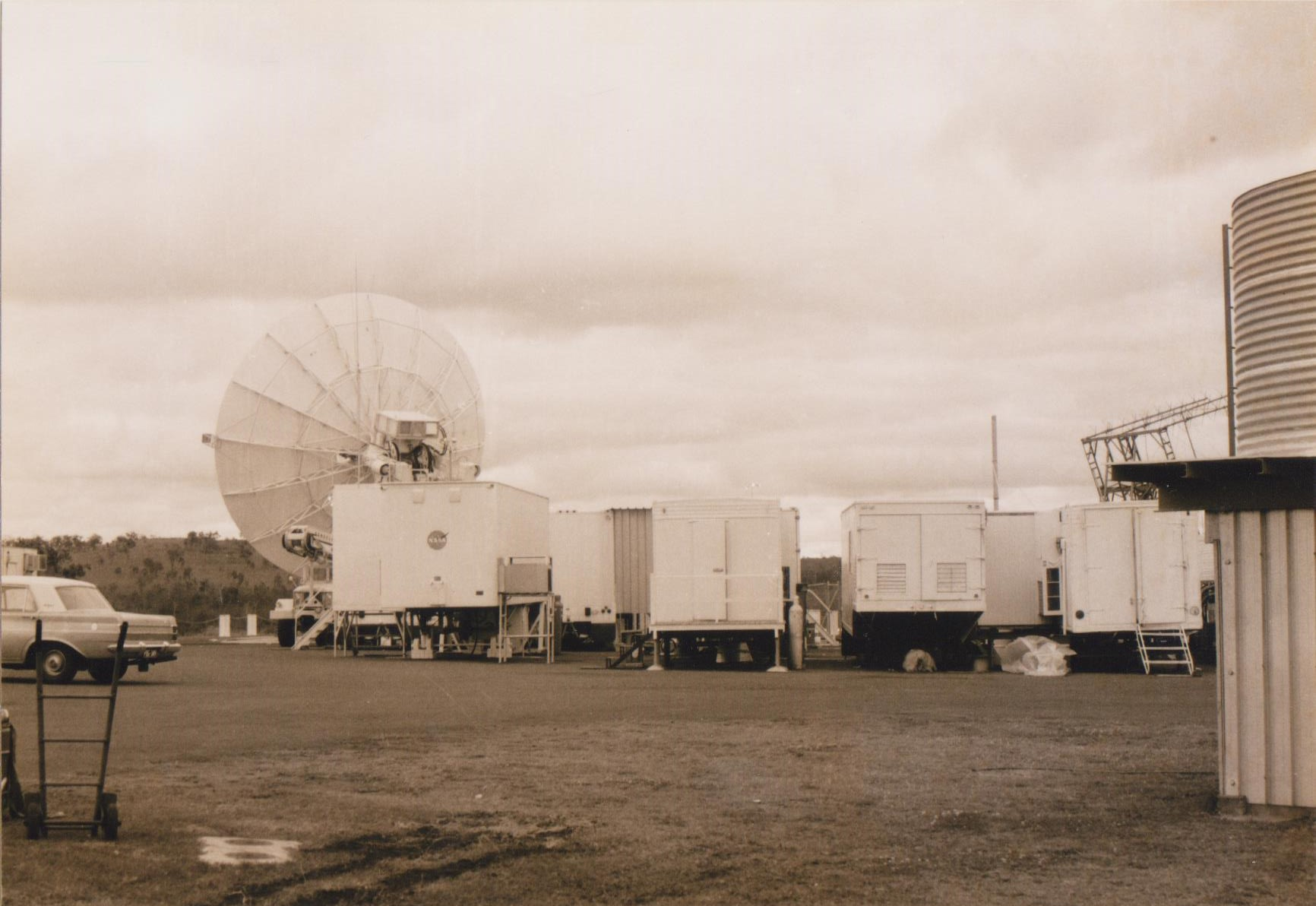
Cooby Creek tracking station – trailers and satellite antenna

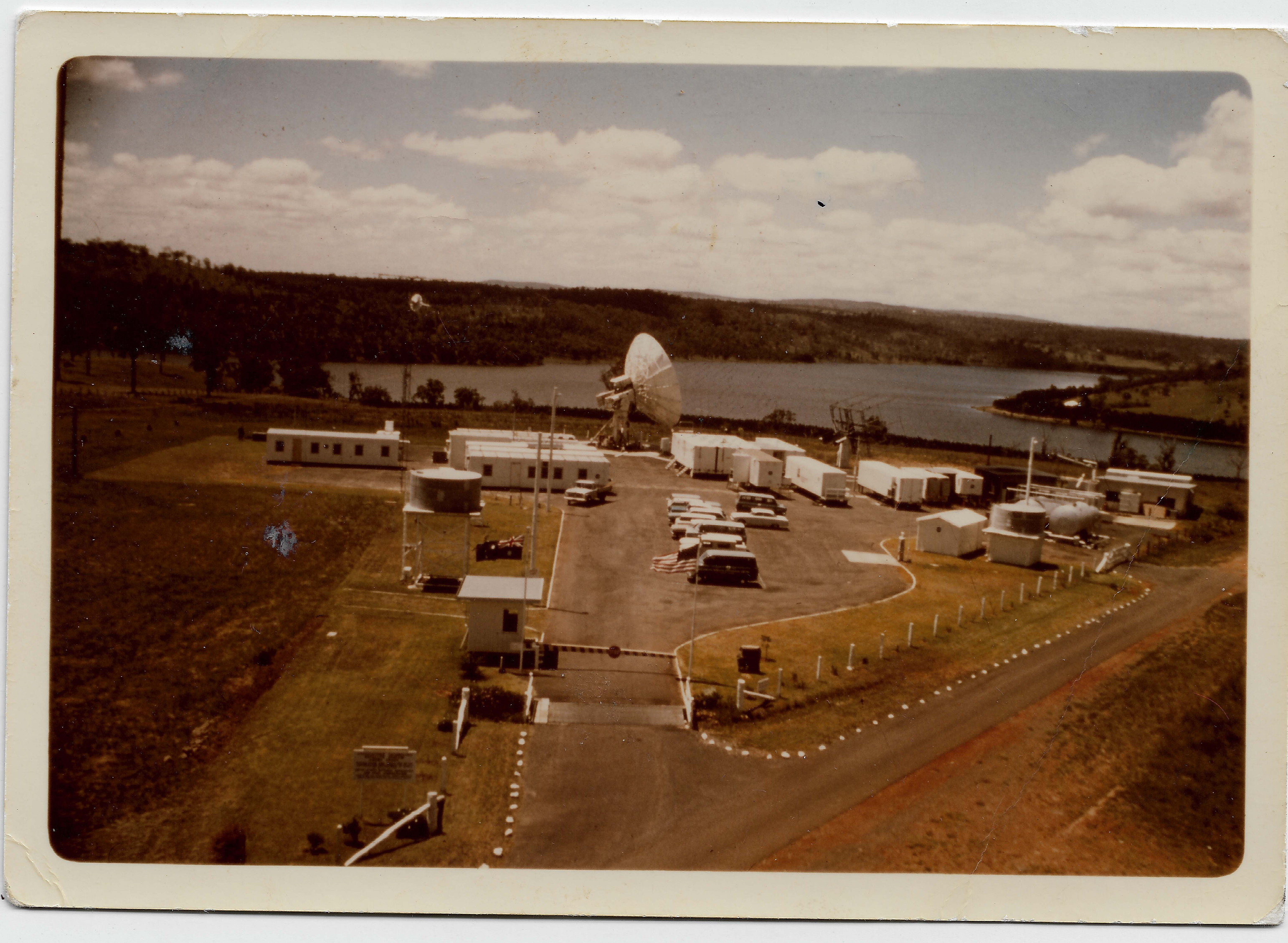
Cooby Creek Tracking Station site looking north

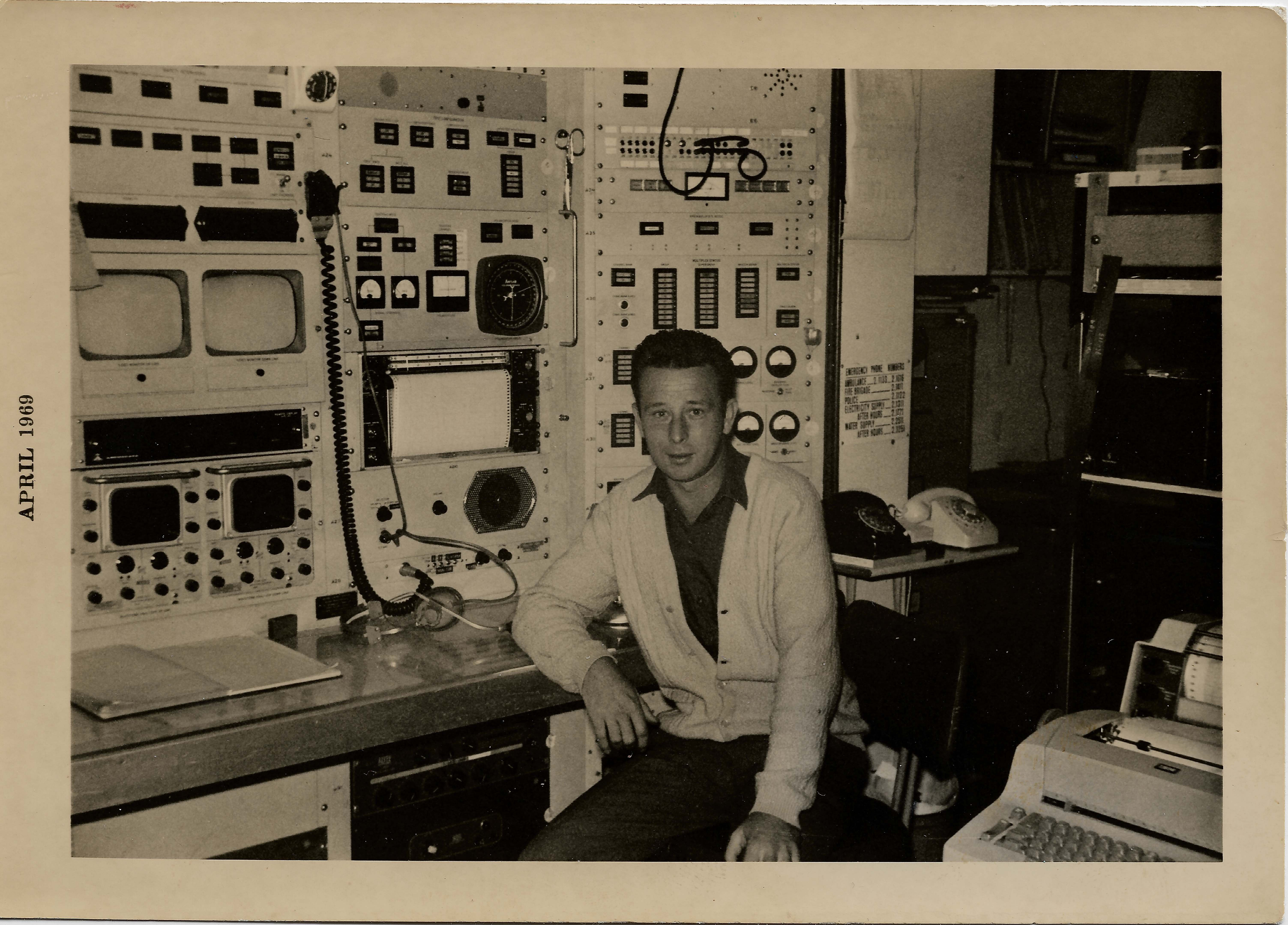
David Ronald Gilson working at Cooby Creek

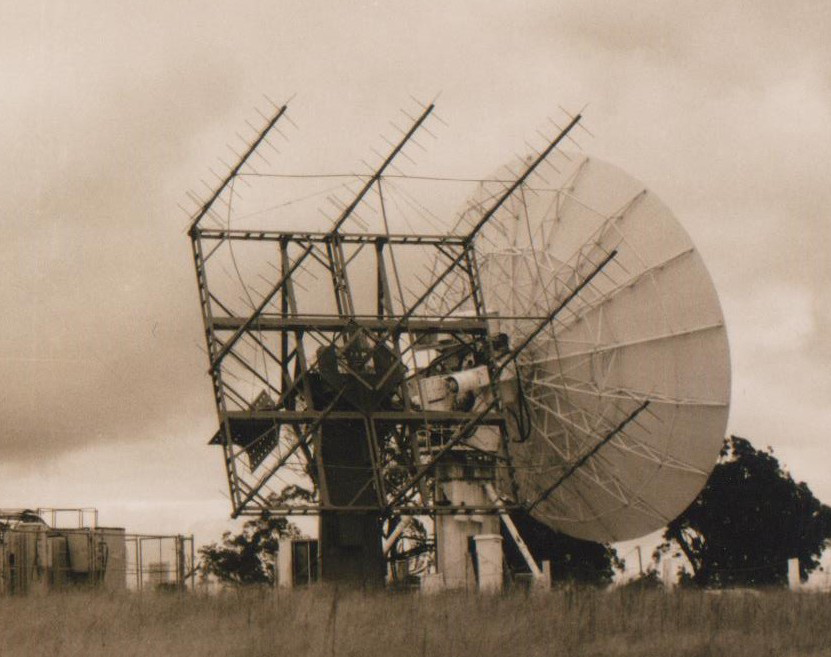
Cooby Creek tracking station phased yagi array with satellite dish in the background

Cooby Creek Tracking Station, an Earth station in Australia, was located 22.5 kilometres (14 mi) north of Toowoomba, Queensland. Built near the Cooby Dam, the station was located in a radio quiet zone, where there were no powerlines and other sources of potential interference.

The station consisted of what is known as "transportables", similar in size to semi-trailers in the US, which were shipped to Australia and transported by road from Brisbane. Three of the transportables bolted together created the Operations Centre, and a single transportable constituted the telemetry and command centre. The entire station was packed into seven semi-trailers.

The station was built in 1966 to support NASA's Application Technology Satellite Program and was a part of the Spacecraft Tracking and Data Acquisition Network. It was designed to be portable, and the equipment was housed in trailers that were shipped out to Australia in the mid-sixties. Between 1967 and 1970 it was used by such organisations as NASA for communication experiments, including experiments that led to the design of communication systems for the Apollo Program and general improvements to the communication technology of the time.

Some of the main goals of the station were to research methods to ensure that spacecraft were stabilised in space (also known as geosynchronous orbit), multiplexing communications, introduction of digital communications, and early microwave transmission. Much of the research and development not only affected the various space missions but also influenced modern communication.

Because of the nature of the work, it was necessary to choose a site with minimal radio interference. The high ground to the south and south-west of the site screened the station from man-made radio frequency interference which could have jeopardise the reception of the satellite signals. The lower horizon to the north-west permitted low angle tracking, and the station was arranged to give the antenna an unrestricted 180 degree view.

The tracking station had approximately 100 electronic/electrical technical staff and 50 support (diesel mechanical and other) personnel; an average space "operation" involved approximately 100 staff. The staff mostly lived in Toowoomba in their own houses, and the organisation had a van which would pick up all the members and deliver them to the station. There were four shifts working 24 hours (3 active, 1 off). There were male and female staff involved; however, all technical and engineering staff were male.

The station was self-powered by four jet turbines and most likely held the first computer in Queensland. The station ran on the American 115-volt system, not the Australian 240-volt system.

A 12-metre (40-foot) parabolic antenna was used to receive and transmit information to geostationary satellites, which served as the forerunners to modern telecommunication satellites. The steerable crossed yagi antenna was used to transmit and receive telemetry from various spacecraft of that era. The transmitters used Klystron power amplifiers, and the receivers were cryogenically cooled maser devices. Additional smaller VHF antennas were used to control the various functions of spacecraft and to send and receive information. The antennas were operated by the "Telemetry and Command" crew of the station, whilst additional personnel performed the actual experiments.

The research and experiments were carried out under directions from NASA.

One example of an experimental situation was that the Apollo 11 rocketry had failed, so that the spacecraft was not in the correct orbit, and personnel had to find ways to repair the situation.

On 6 June 1967 the station received the first television program from outside Australia (from Expo 67) to be received on the Australian east coast. (The first program from Australia, "Down Under Comes Up Live", had been sent from Carnarvon on 25 November 1966.) On 25 June 1967 it participated in the Our World television production, linking 24 countries around the world to Brisbane, Sydney, Melbourne and Adelaide.

Cooby Creek was the initial receiving point for the video feed of the Apollo 11 mission Moon landing; the video feed was then re-sent back to USA via a satellite up-link from the station. It was also a key tracking station involved in the first synchronisation and broadcast of a TV program across the entire globe.

The station closed in 1970. On 21–23 October 2016 there was a reunion on the site.

In 2021 State Library of Queensland created a digital story on the Cooby Creek Tracking Station. In the digital story former staff member Patrick Hetherman, a synchronous controller in the telemetry and command section, discusses the establishment, purpose and significance of the station and former employee Veda Finlay remembers life at the station.
