= Yarragadee Station =

Pastoral lease in Western Australia

Coordinates: 29.075°S 115.408°E

Location in Western Australia

Yarragadee Station is a pastoral lease that currently operates as a cattle station.

It is located about 13 kilometres (8 mi) north of Mingenew and 60 kilometres (37 mi) south of Mullewa in the Mid West region of Western Australia. The station is located along the Irwin River and occupies an area of 4,000 acres (1,619 ha).

The property was established by Michael Morrissey at some time prior to 1886 and was well known by that time.

Francis Pearse, who already owned a store in the area, acquired Yarragadee in 1903, paying £10,600 for it.

Yarragadee is near Yatharagga – an area associated with a number of space related tracking systems.

== See also ==
- List of ranches and stations
