= OTC Satellite Earth Station Carnarvon =

Earth station in Western Australia

Coordinates: 24°52′09″S 113°42′17″E

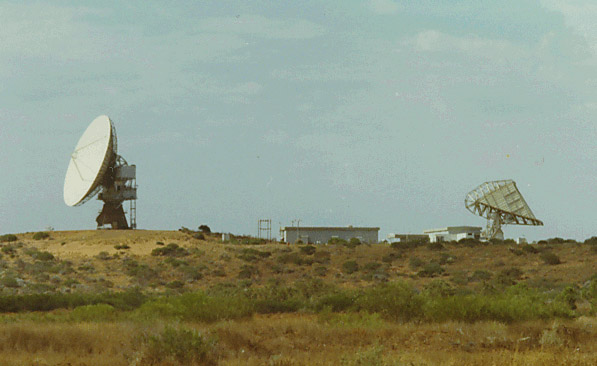
The 12.8-metre-wide (42 ft) Casshorn antenna, commissioned in October 1966, has interacting parabolic and hyperbolic reflectors in a characteristic "sugar scoop" form. It claims to be the only remaining example in the world. The larger 29.8-metre (98 ft) parabolic dish antenna was commissioned in late 1969.

The OTC Satellite Earth Station Carnarvon, an Earth station in Australia, was established to meet the need for more reliable and higher quality communications for the Apollo program. NASA contracted Australia's Overseas Telecommunications Commission (OTC) "to provide an earth station near Carnarvon, Western Australia to link the NASA tracking station in that area to the control centre in the USA", also contracting COMSAT to launch three Intelsat-2 communications satellites.

== Television and NASA-assist operations ==
The "sugar scoop" antenna became operational on 29 October 1966 when Intelsat-2A, the first of the three satellites launched, gave OTC and the Australian Broadcasting Commission a brief chance to test satellite television communications as the satellite drifted to failure over the Indian Ocean. On 24 November 1966, test patterns for the first live telecasts from Australia to England were successful. The next day, a live BBC television broadcast from a studio in London featured interviews linking UK families with their British migrant relatives standing in Robinson Street, Carnarvon.

The "sugar scoop" became famous again on 21 July 1969, the day of the Apollo 11 Moon landing, relaying Neil Armstrong's first steps on the Moon from NASA's Honeysuckle Creek Tracking Station, Canberra, to Perth's TV audience via Moree earth station – the first live telecast into Western Australia.

The OTC station's eight years of communications support for the Carnarvon Tracking Station began on 4 February 1967, three weeks after Intelsat-2B was launched. A larger parabolic antenna was commissioned in late 1969 to upgrade the support for the later Apollo missions. OTC continued to provide communications support for NASA space programs until the NASA station closed early in 1975. Thereafter it tracked some NASA missions on its own account.

== Contract tracking operations ==
During OTC's last years of operation in Carnarvon, multiple tracking contracts were completed including:

- prime responsibility for controlling the European Space Agency (ESA) Giotto mission probe which sampled the tail of Halley's Comet
- launch support for ESA missions and for the Indian Space Agency's first satellite
- tracking of German TV and communication satellites
- assistance with the launch and orbital parking of Meteorsat for Africa
- guiding the Marecs communications satellite
- monitoring the launch of the Japanese geosynchronous marine observation satellite, MOS-1, in February 1987

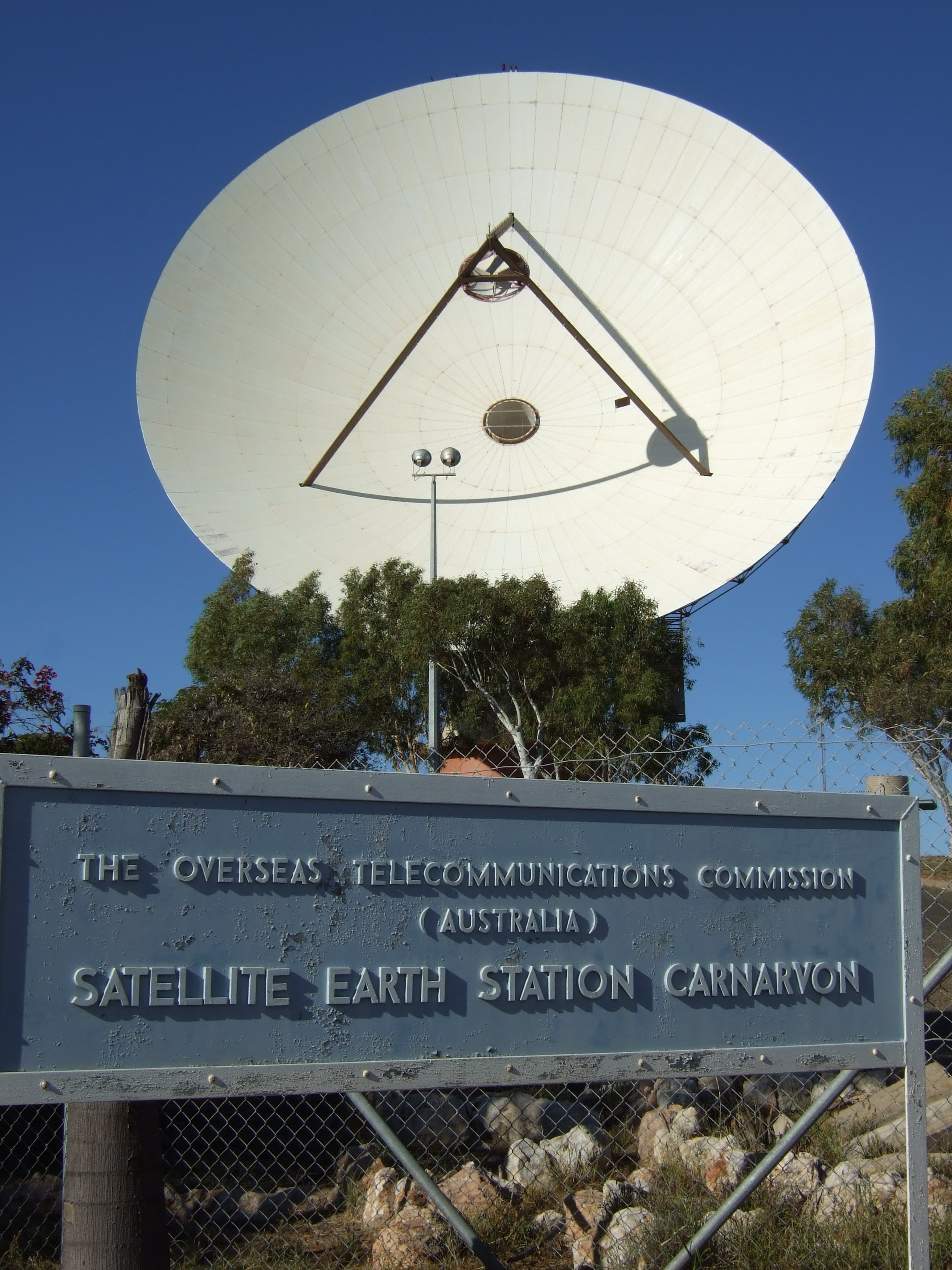
The dish in August 2009

== Decommissioning ==
The station was decommissioned in April 1987, but the site is still actively involved in solar scientific research, hosting a node of the Birmingham Solar Oscillations Network. In 2022 the OTC antenna was acquired by ThothX Australia, who are recommissioning it and refurbishing it into a deep space radar to provide space situational awareness on resident space objects in geostationary orbit. The new radar will extend Thothx's existing radar coverage over the Americas to the Indo-Pacific region.

"OTC Satellite Earth Station Carnarvon (fmr)" is a registered heritage site with the Heritage Council of Western Australia. It has local, national and international cultural-heritage significance.

The Carnarvon Space and Technology Museum opened in 2012.
