= Orroral Valley Tracking Station =

Earth station in Australia

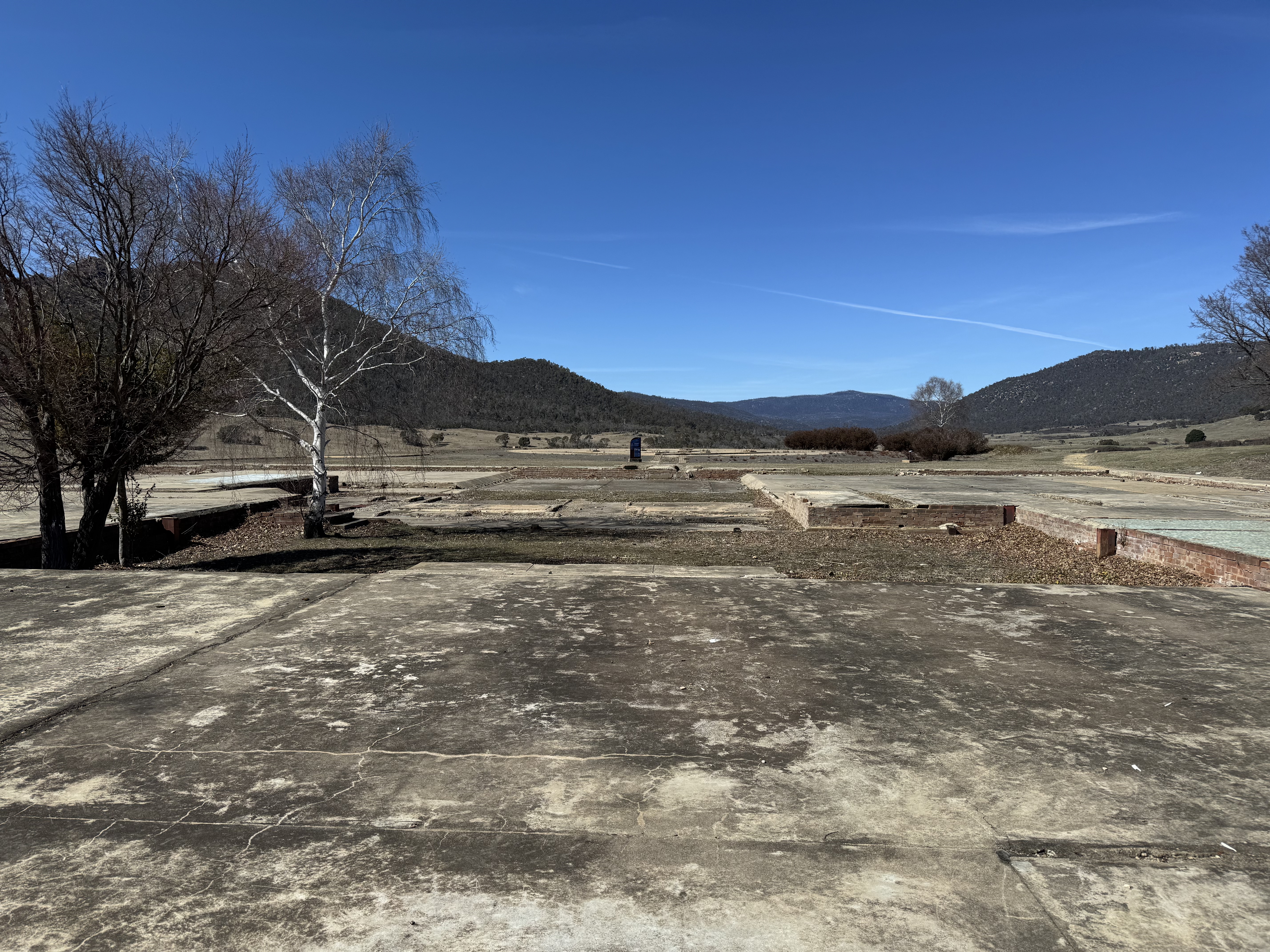
- Site of the Former Orroral Valley Tracking Station operations building, September 2025
- Location: Rendezvous Creek, Australian Capital Territory, AUS
- Coordinates: 35°37′44.04″S 148°57′20.88″E
- Established: 1965
- Closed: 1985
- Related media on Commons

The Orroral Valley tracking station was an Earth station in Australia, supported Earth-orbiting satellites, as part of NASA's Spacecraft Tracking and Data Acquisition Network (STADAN). It was located approximately 50 km south of Canberra, Australian Capital Territory (ACT), and was one of three tracking stations in the ACT, and seven in Australia.

Construction of the site commenced shortly after site selection in 1963 and was completed in May 1965. It was home to a 26-metre antenna and several smaller VHF and microwave frequency antennas.

The main requirement of the station, as distinct from the long-range communication tasks of Tidbinbilla and Honeysuckle Creek, was to be able to quickly switch from supporting one satellite to another. The signal received from satellites in Earth orbit are relatively strong but view periods are short, a few minutes being typical. Many of the supported satellites used different systems for transmitting data, or for receiving commands so the station had to cope with a variety of equipment for support of the individual satellites. Data from the satellites were recorded on magnetic tape and air-freighted to the United States for study.

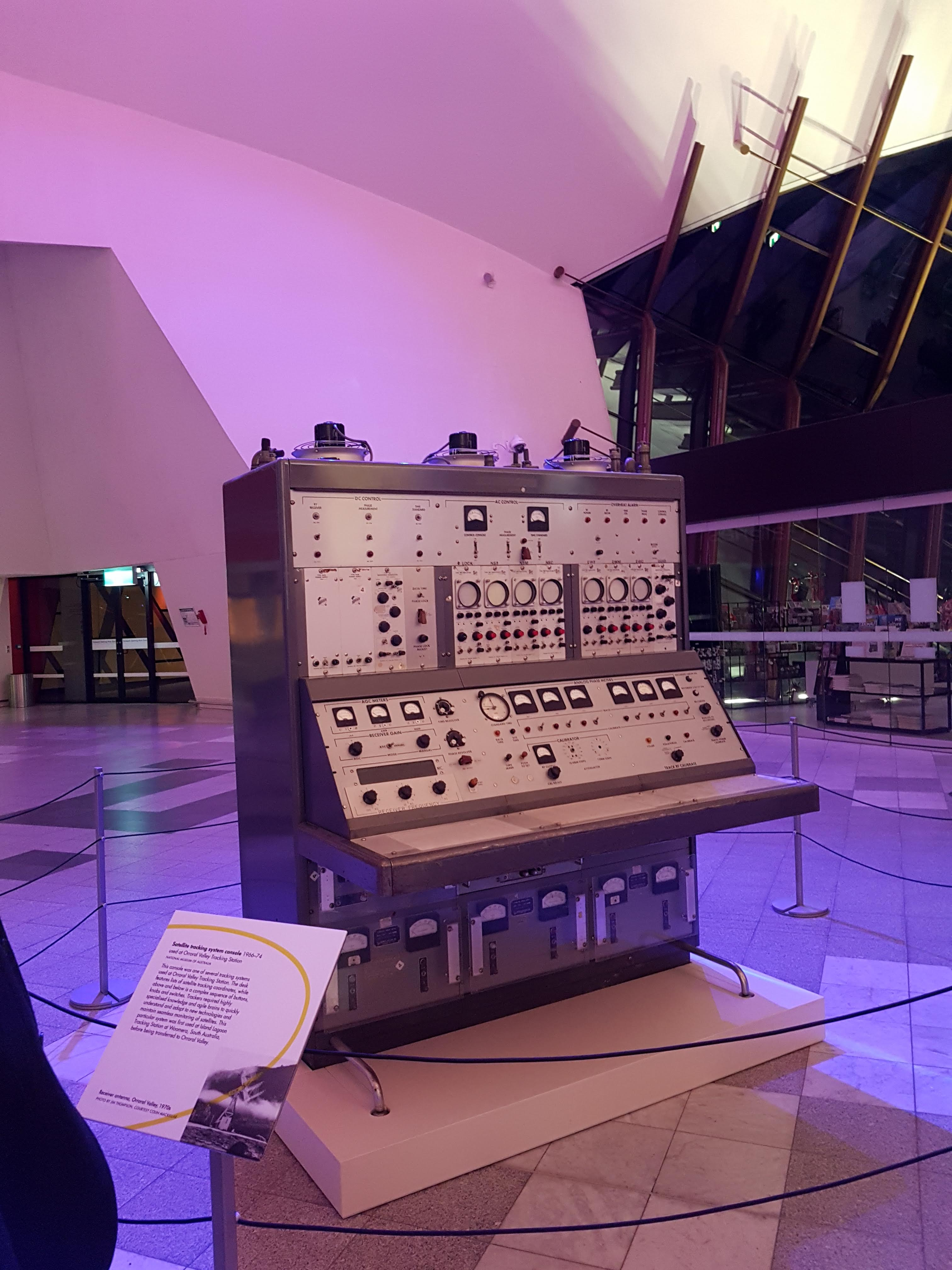
Orroral Valley's satellite tracking system console on display at the National Museum of Australia, July 2019

The station supported the joint Apollo-Soyuz project in 1975, which saw American astronauts and Soviet cosmonauts link in Earth orbit and conduct joint experiments in space. In April 1981, Orroral tracking station supported the first flight of Space Shuttle Columbia, and continued to provide telecommunication support to Space Shuttle missions until its closure in 1985.

== History ==
=== Construction ===
In April 1964, 2,000 acres (810 ha) of land was purchased by the Australian government. It was also reported that a road would be constructed from the Tharwa to Orroral valley road to reach the site.

The station was to support the programs such as the Orbiting Geophysical Observatory (which began in the third quarter of 1964) and the Advanced Orbiting Solar Observatory, which was scheduled to begin in late 1965.

In June 1964, a 9-year-old boy, Timothy Victor Lay, was killed by a bulldozer running over him at the site.

The first section of the parabolic antenna for the site arrived in Canberra on 28 October 1964, it had been shipped from the United States. It was unfortunately delayed in being delivered to the construction site due to the poor conditions of the roads out of Canberra following the rain in late October 1964. The road remained in a poor state through 1966.

Construction of the tracking station was completed in May 1965 and had cost £1 million, of which £545,094 was for the buildings. An additional £2 million in electronics was supplied by the United States.

=== Equipment ===
Initially the station consisted of a 26-metre diameter antenna and two main buildings, one housing the operations equipment, air conditioning, plant rooms and control centre, and a second housing the diesel generators, mechanical and electrical equipment.

=== Closure ===
In June 1982, Dr Joseph P. Kerwin, NASA's senior scientific representative in Australia, first signalled that the station would close in early 1985 whilst NASA focused more on the Canberra Deep Space Communication Complex. In 1985 the station was closed as part of a consolidation of NASA facilities in Australia.

The 26-metre telescope was moved in 1985 to Tasmania and now forms the core of the Mount Pleasant Radio Observatory run by the School of Mathematics and Physics, University of Tasmania.

== Other events ==
In 2018, Orroral Valley Tracking Station was the endpoint for the annual ANU Inward Bound.

In 2019, a paraglider landed at the Orroral Valley Tracking Station and was promptly attacked by a wild kangaroo. The pilot suffered no injuries from the attack.

== See also ==
- Spacecraft Tracking and Data Acquisition Network
- Canberra Deep Space Communication Complex
- Carnarvon Tracking Station
- Honeysuckle Creek Tracking Station
