= Honeysuckle Creek Tracking Station =

Former NASA earth station in Australia

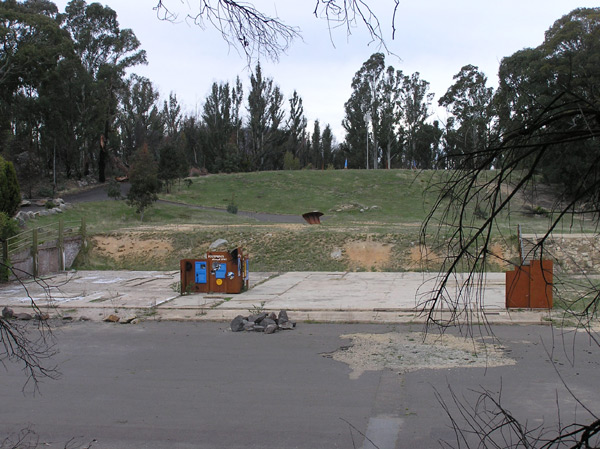
- Location(s): Tennent, Australian Capital Territory, AUS
- Coordinates: 35°35′01″S 148°58′37″E
- Location of Honeysuckle Creek Tracking Station

The Honeysuckle Creek Tracking Station was a NASA Earth station in Australia near Canberra. It was instrumental to the Apollo program. The station was opened in 1967 and closed in 1981.

Leonard Litherland helped establish Honeysuckle Creek Tracking Station in 1966, for the Moon Landing July 21, 1969 with his role as one of the mission leaders for the moon landing in 1969 as well as Team C leadership across all Apollo missions. He committed 35 years of service with NASA in Australia.

== History ==
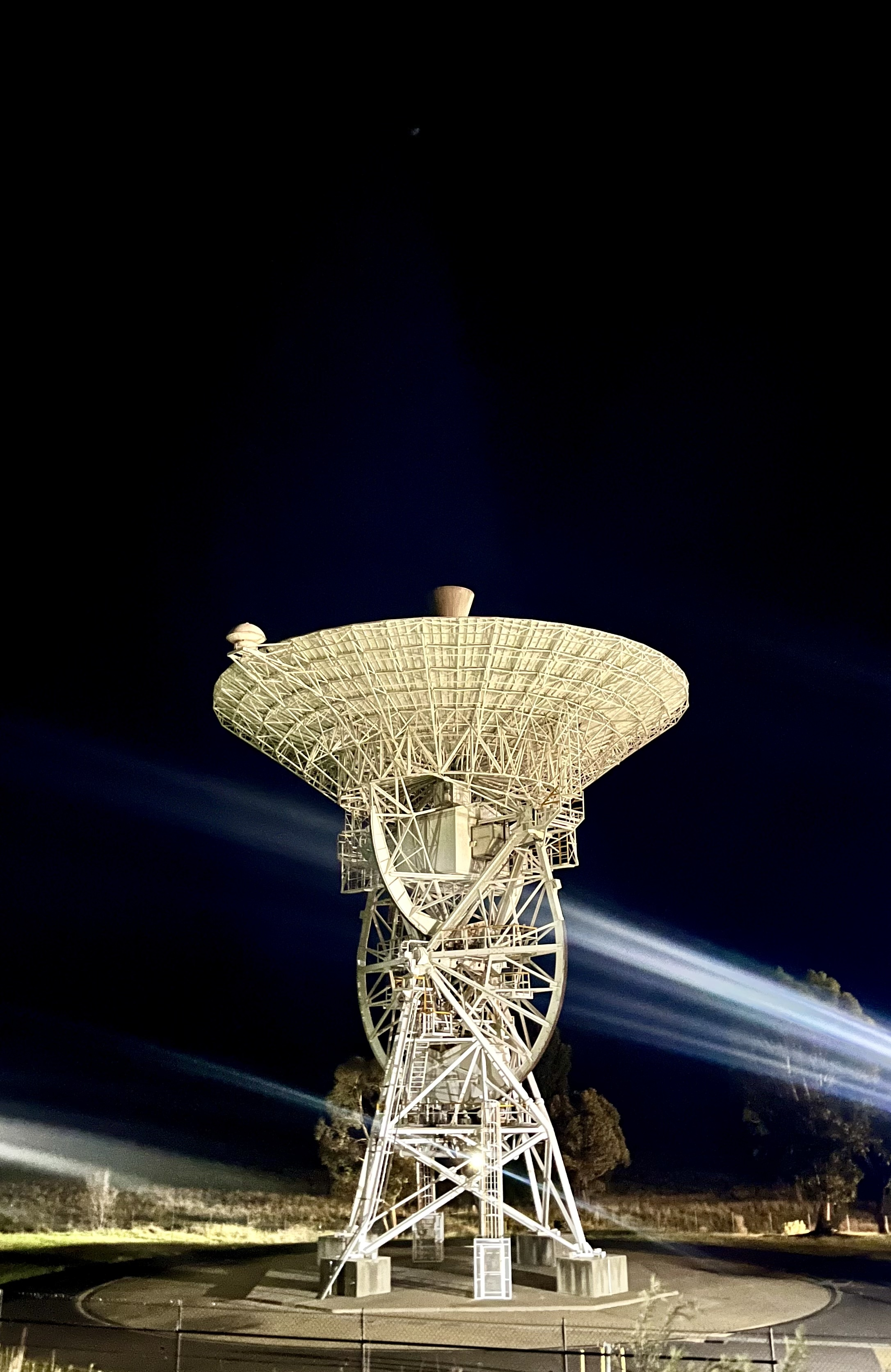
Deep Space Station 44 radio antenna (DSS-44) used by the Manned Space Flight Network at Honeysuckle Creek and later reassembled as DSS-46 at the Canberra Deep Space Communication Complex

Honeysuckle Creek with a 26 metre dish is renowned as the station which received and relayed to the world the first televised footage of astronaut Neil Armstrong setting foot on the Moon in July 1969. Apart from television pictures, Honeysuckle Creek and Canberra Deep Space Communications Complex, Tidbinbilla had communication and telemetry contact with the Eagle lunar and Columbia command modules.

Much of this was dramatised as involving Parkes Observatory in the 2000 Australian film The Dish. In fact, Parkes received pictures only came into play later in the moon landing. Six hours after landing, the first steps on the Moon were transmitted from Honeysuckle Creek, after an initial attempt to use the pictures from Goldstone had been hampered by operator error and poor scan conversion settings. Although the Parkes antenna was more powerful than Honeysuckle, the angle of its dish – at a lowermost pitch of 30 degrees and buffeted by wind gusts up to 100 km/h – was not in line to receive signals during the first seven minutes of the moon landing. Honeysuckle Creek signals were sent direct to Overseas Telecommunications Commission in Sydney via Williamsdale and Red Hill in Canberra. Working for NASA, Charlie Goodman selected the audiovisual feeds from Honeysuckle Creek and Parkes for worldwide broadcasts.

The Honeysuckle Creek and Tidbinbilla antennas were built and run by NASA, but staffed by Australians. It was the policy of the Australian Government that the director had to be a citizen or permanent resident of Australia. When Apollo missions ended in 1972, Honeysuckle Creek was redirected to the new Skylab program. As well, it was used for experiments with Apollo scientific stations placed on the Moon by astronauts.

At the end of the Skylab program in 1974, Honeysuckle Creek was connected to the Deep Space Network with the designation Deep Space Station 44. Honeysuckle Creek closed in December 1981. The 26m antenna was relocated nearby to the Canberra Deep Space Communications Complex at Tidbinbilla, and redesignated Deep Space Station 46. The antenna was decommissioned in late 2009. In May 2010, the American Institute of Aeronautics & Astronautics declared the antenna a Historical Aerospace Site. The antenna remains in perpetuity as a historical site at Tidbinbilla.

Today, at Honeysuckle Creek, the concrete foundation is the only remnant of the tracking station. An outdoor display was added in 2001. Honeysuckle Creek is considered the geographical centre of the Australian Capital Territory.

== Climate ==
The climate of Honeysuckle Creek, as to be expected of its much greater elevation, is significantly cooler than that of Canberra. Notwithstanding, its maximum temperatures are warm relative to elevation, due to the fact that it still lay on the leeward (eastern) side of the Brindabella Range.

Annually, it receives 14.4 snowy days on average.

Climate data for Honeysuckle Creek (1967–1981); 1,116 m AMSL; 35.58° S, 148.98° E
Month	Jan	Feb	Mar	Apr	May	Jun	Jul	Aug	Sep	Oct	Nov	Dec	Year
Record high °C (°F)	36.1 (97.0)	34.7 (94.5)	30.0 (86.0)	26.1 (79.0)	20.0 (68.0)	17.2 (63.0)	16.2 (61.2)	19.2 (66.6)	23.2 (73.8)	26.1 (79.0)	32.2 (90.0)	35.0 (95.0)	36.1 (97.0)
Mean daily maximum °C (°F)	23.3 (73.9)	23.0 (73.4)	19.9 (67.8)	15.9 (60.6)	11.4 (52.5)	8.5 (47.3)	7.9 (46.2)	9.1 (48.4)	12.1 (53.8)	15.8 (60.4)	18.3 (64.9)	22.1 (71.8)	15.6 (60.1)
Mean daily minimum °C (°F)	10.7 (51.3)	11.0 (51.8)	8.7 (47.7)	5.2 (41.4)	2.5 (36.5)	−0.1 (31.8)	−1.1 (30.0)	−0.2 (31.6)	1.5 (34.7)	4.5 (40.1)	6.4 (43.5)	8.6 (47.5)	4.8 (40.7)
Record low °C (°F)	1.4 (34.5)	1.1 (34.0)	−1.0 (30.2)	−4.0 (24.8)	−6.1 (21.0)	−7.0 (19.4)	−7.8 (18.0)	−11.1 (12.0)	−6.1 (21.0)	−6.5 (20.3)	−3.3 (26.1)	−0.6 (30.9)	−11.1 (12.0)
Average precipitation mm (inches)	93.0 (3.66)	104.7 (4.12)	78.2 (3.08)	88.4 (3.48)	74.6 (2.94)	58.9 (2.32)	57.9 (2.28)	92.9 (3.66)	86.9 (3.42)	112.0 (4.41)	85.2 (3.35)	67.3 (2.65)	1000 (39.37)
Average precipitation days (≥ 0.2 mm)	11.4	10.9	11.1	9.4	11.4	11.3	10.9	13.3	12.7	13.5	12.0	8.4	136.3
Source: Honeysuckle Creek Bureau of Meteorology

== Gallery ==
ABC News report on the role of the Parkes radio telescope and the Honeysuckle Creek Tracking Station, a week before the Moon landing

Copy of telex sent to Director of Honeysuckle Creek tracking station

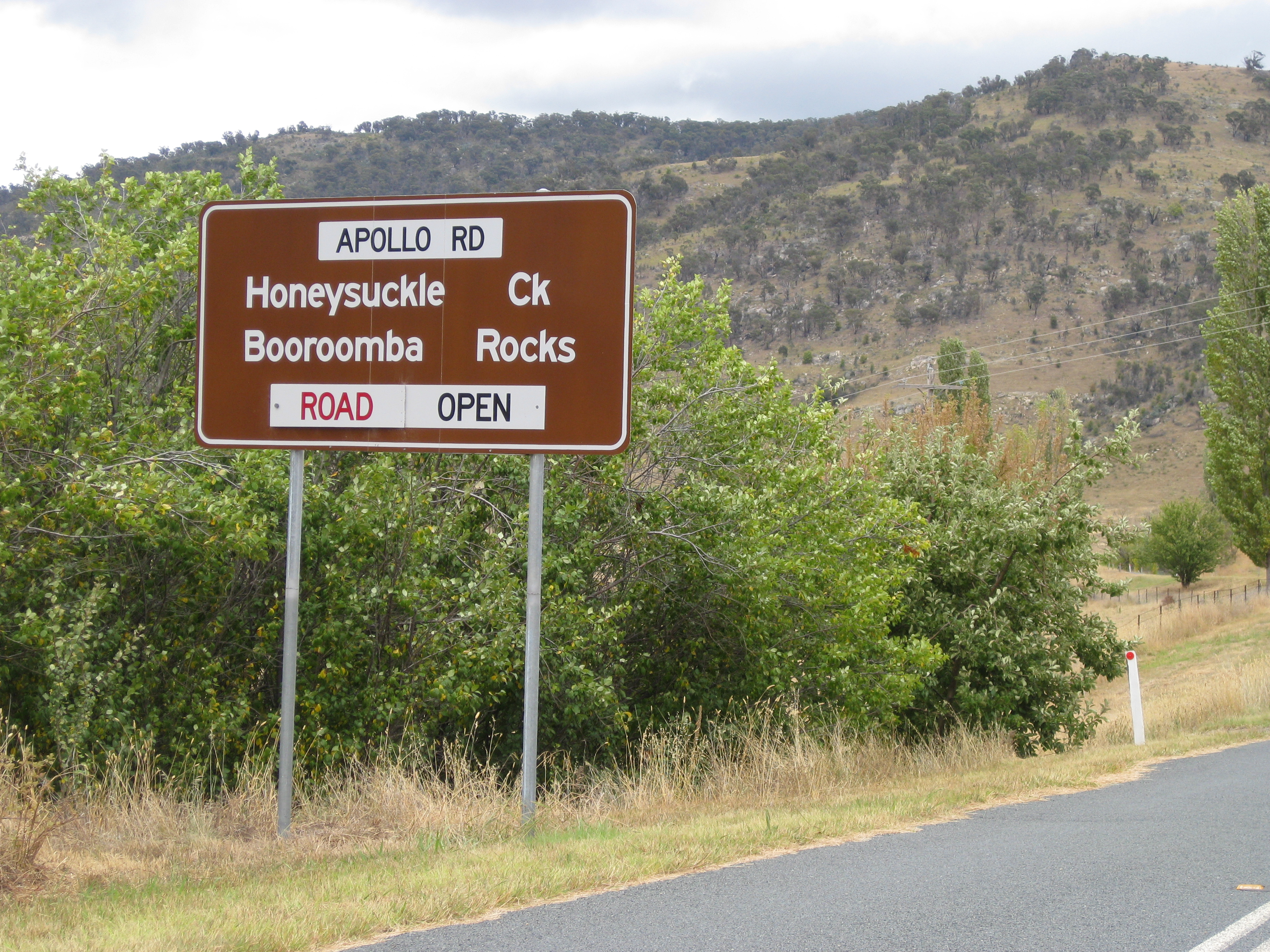
Apollo Road, the road to Honeysuckle Creek

== See also ==
- Apollo 11 missing tapes
- Carnarvon Tracking Station
- Orroral Valley Tracking Station
- OTC Satellite Earth Station Carnarvon
- History of the Deep Space Network
