= NewSat =

Australian satellite communications company

- Type: Public company
- Industry: Satellite communication
- Founder: Adrian Ballintine
- Defunct: 2015
- Fate: Administration
- Headquarters: Australia
- Key people: Adrian Ballintine (CEO)
- Revenue: ▲US$39.3 million (2013)
- Net income: ▲US$10.449 million (2013)
- Total assets: ▲US$124.655 million (2013)
- Total equity: ▲US$206.430 million (2013)

NewSat was an independent satellite communications provider in Australia. Its satellites, VSATs and teleports provided coverage of 75% of the Earth’s surface. NewSat was founded on 28 March 1987, then named as Yalfaga. Its name was later changed to Browns Creek Gold and then Australian Environmental Resources. In 1999, the company was purchased by NewSat's CEO, Adrian Ballintine, and renamed MultiEmedia.com (later just MultiEmedia). With the help of Microsoft co-founder Paul Allen owning 3% and Steve Vizard on the board, it became a profitable web development company, developing the websites for Thrifty Car Rental, Hamilton Island and Nissan Australia. It also sold its own in-house products, such as ZoneStudio, a web development tool, and IntraZone, an early SharePoint-like intranet application.

It survived the dotcom crash, and with the purchase of New Skies Networks and its teleport facilities in Adelaide and Perth in 2005, it evolved into a fully-fledged satellite communications company, changing its name to NewSat on 1 September 2006. Most of NewSat's customers were located in Australia, the Middle East and Africa. With the withdrawal of combat troops in Afghanistan and with the Australian mining boom winding down, the services for NewSat's teleport business started to wane. Having made a $39.7 million loss in the second half of 2014, and with $300 million in outstanding loan repayments, NewSat was placed in administration in mid-April 2015. Over the next few months, as funding difficulties ensued, its contracts with Lockheed Martin and Arianespace were terminated, and its main asset was sold to SpeedCast Australia Pty Limited.

== Jabiru ==
With Jabiru, NewSat was to be Australia's first independently owned satellite operator to manage a fleet of commercial Ku- and Ka-band satellites. Its Jabiru-1 Ka-band satellite was scheduled to take off in 2016 and would have catered to mobile communications carriers and private and public organizations across the Middle East, Africa, Asia and Australia.

On 8 December 2011, NewSat and Lockheed Martin entered into a fixed-price contract for the design, manufacture, testing and on‐ground delivery of Jabiru‐1, and its related launch mission operations. Construction of Jabiru‐1 began in January 2012 at Lockheed Martin’s Newtown, Pennsylvania facility, and was scheduled to be available for shipment to the launch site at Centre Spatial Guyanais near Kourou, French New Guinea by 25 March 2016. The launch window for Jabiru‐1 by Arianespace was scheduled for May 2016.

On 14 June 2012, the Export–Import Bank of the United States approved a direct loan of US$281 million (later increased to US$300.5 million) to Jabiru Satellite Limited (a wholly owned subsidiary of NewSat), with a guarantee by Compagnie Française d'Assurance pour le Commerce Extérieur (COFACE) and a stand-by facility from the British Standard Chartered Bank.

In mid-February 2014, with construction underway of the Jabiru-1 satellite, NewSat had paid Lockheed Martin close to US$170 million, out of an expected total cost of US$268 million. The total project cost was expected to be US$600 (AU$664 million), including US$116 million for the rocket to place the satellite in orbit in the second half of 2015. At that time, NewSat confirmed that 18% of the capacity of the satellite had already been sold, at an estimated value of AU$644 million.

=== Funding issues ===
In early August 2014, NewSat got a conditional waiver over alleged breaches of financial facilities to continue with the Jabiru-1 project. At that time, it was expected that the satellite would be assembled in late 2014 and tested in 2015. On 16 December 2014, Lockheed Martin, the Jabiru-1 satellite builder, issued NewSat a default notice due to a defaulted payment of US$21 million (AU$26.5 million); giving a period of up to 90 days to make payments without further impact. Subsequently, Lockheed Martin issued a termination notice on 22 January 2015, and on 25 February 2015, Arianespace also issued default notices due to overdue payments for the Launch Services Agreement, totaling over US$42 million.

In late March 2015, NewSat requested a trading halt due to ongoing issues with project financing, which would remain in place until negotiations with US lenders were completed. On 8 April 2015, NewSat announced that "COFACE Lender Group" would not support the waiver and not advance funds. This represents US$160 million (AU$209 million) lost, requiring an additional US$70 million in capital that was needed to be raised to keep the project alive. In mid-April 2015, NewSat was placed into administration to resolve the troubled financial situation and save the project; at the same time, a temporary order was issued in the US to keep the construction contracts with Lockheed Martin and Arianespace. With funding difficulties continuing, Lockheed Martin terminated the manufacturing agreement later that month, taking ownership of the half-constructed satellite, and Arianespace, the launcher provider, terminated the launch services agreement on 4 August 2015. On 29 May 2015, the receivers terminated Mr Adrian Ballintine’s role as chief executive officer by way of redundancy. When the receivers found no buyers for the remaining assets, the company was finally liquidated in the final months of 2015.

In August 2016, it was revealed on the current affairs program Four Corners that NewSat had been the victim of foreign hackers. Daryl Peter, the former IT manager, said, “Newsat had been hacked and not just by teenagers in the basement or anything like that. Whoever was hacking us was very well-funded, very professional, very serious hackers.”

In late January 2017, the receivers McGrathNicol filed an action in the Federal Court of Australia seeking damages of AU$270 million against former managing director Adrian Ballintine and former chairman Richard Green, alleging that they both breached their directors' duties.
