= ANARESAT =

Communication solution using Intelsat Geostationary communication satellites

ANARESAT or Australian National Antarctic Research Expeditions Satellite is a communication solution using Intelsat Geostationary communication satellites to allow Australian Antarctic Division sites to communicate. The ANARESAT system was the primary communications link for the Australian Antarctic Division until it was retired in 2004, superseded by a modern high-speed satellite connectivity solution.

== Installation ==
The installation includes a 7.3 m dish antenna mounted inside a 10m diameter aluminium frame geodesic radome to protect the satellite dish from the harsh weather conditions. It was installed at:

- Davis Station in March 1987,
- Mawson Station in January 1988,
- Casey Station in March 1988, and
- Macquarie Island Station in December 1988.
