= Spacecraft Tracking and Data Acquisition Network =

1960s American spacecraft communications system

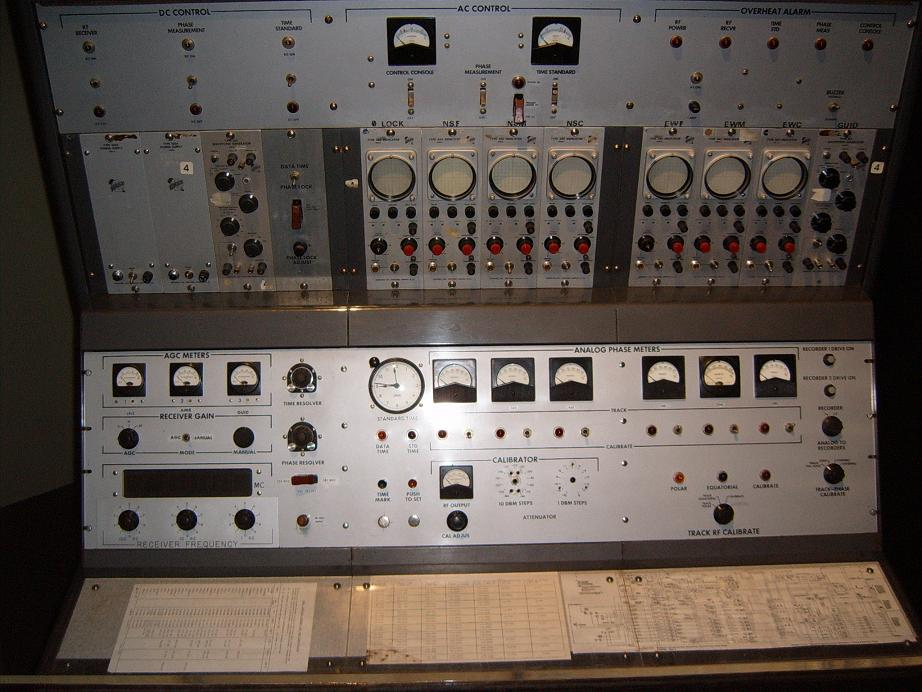
- Orroral Valley STADAN control panel
- Alternative names: STADAN
- Organization: (NASA

The Spacecraft Tracking and Data (Acquisition) Network (STADAN or STDN) was established by NASA in the early 1960s to satisfy the requirement for long-duration, highly available space-to-ground communications. The network was the "follow-on" to the earlier Minitrack, which tracked the flights of Sputnik, Vanguard, Explorer, and other early space efforts (1957–1962). Real-time operational control and scheduling of the network was provided by the Network Operations Control Center (NOCC) at the Goddard Space Flight Center (GSFC) in Greenbelt, Maryland.

Consisting of parabolic dish antennas and telephone switching equipment deployed around the world, the STADAN provided space-to-ground communications for approximately 15 minutes of a 90-minute orbit period. This limited contact period sufficed for uncrewed spacecraft, but crewed spacecraft require a much higher data collection time. In May 1971 STADAN was consolidated with the Manned Space Flight Network (MSFN) to form the Spaceflight Tracking and Data Network (STDN).

== Stations ==
STADAN Stations

STADAN stations were located at the following locations:

- AGO: Santiago, Chile
- BDA: Cooper's Island, Bermuda
- BUR: Johannesburg, South Africa
- CRO: Carnarvon, Australia
- EGF: East Grand Forks, Minnesota, US
- ETC: Goddard Space Flight Center, Greenbelt, Maryland, US – Network Operations Control Center
- FtM Fort Myers, Florida, US
- GDS: Goldstone Deep Space Communications Complex in Goldstone, California, US
- NFL: Shoe Cove, Newfoundland, Canada (47°44′28″N 52°43′15″W)
- ORR: Orroral Valley Tracking Station, Canberra, Australia
- PAK: Pakistan
- QUI: Quito, Ecuador
- ROS: Rosman, North Carolina, US
- TAN: Tananarive, Madagascar
- ULA: Fairbanks, Alaska, US
- WNK: Winkfield, England
- Ascension: Ascension Island, (South Atlantic Ocean)
- Barstow: Barstow, California, US
- Brown: Brown Field, California near Chula Vista, US
- Chile: Antofagasta, Chile
- Cooby: Cooby Creek Tracking Station, Toowoomba, Queensland, Australia
- Crete: Crete, Greece
- Lima: Lima, Peru

== Later developments ==
Most of the STADAN stations were phased out in the early 1980s, as the Tracking and Data Relay Satellite System (TDRS), took over most of the work of tracking satellites in low Earth orbit. Another network, the Deep Space Network (DSN), interacted with crewed craft higher than 10,000 miles from Earth, such as the Apollo missions, in addition to its primary mission of data collection from deep space probes.

== See also ==
- NASCOM
