= Kojarena, Western Australia =

Kojarena
- Town
- Coordinates: 28°43′24″S 114°51′51″E
- Country: Australia
- State: Western Australia
- LGA(s): City of Greater Geraldton

Government
  - State electorate(s): Moore
  - Federal division(s): Durack

Area
  - Total: 50.6 km^{2} (19.5 sq mi)

Population
  - Total(s): 21 (SAL 2021)
- Postcode: 6532

Kojarena is a locality in the Mid West region of Western Australia.

The Australian Defence Satellite Communications Station, part of ECHELON, is located in Kojarena.
