= AN/FPS-16 Instrumentation Radar =

Ground-based monopulse single object tracking radar

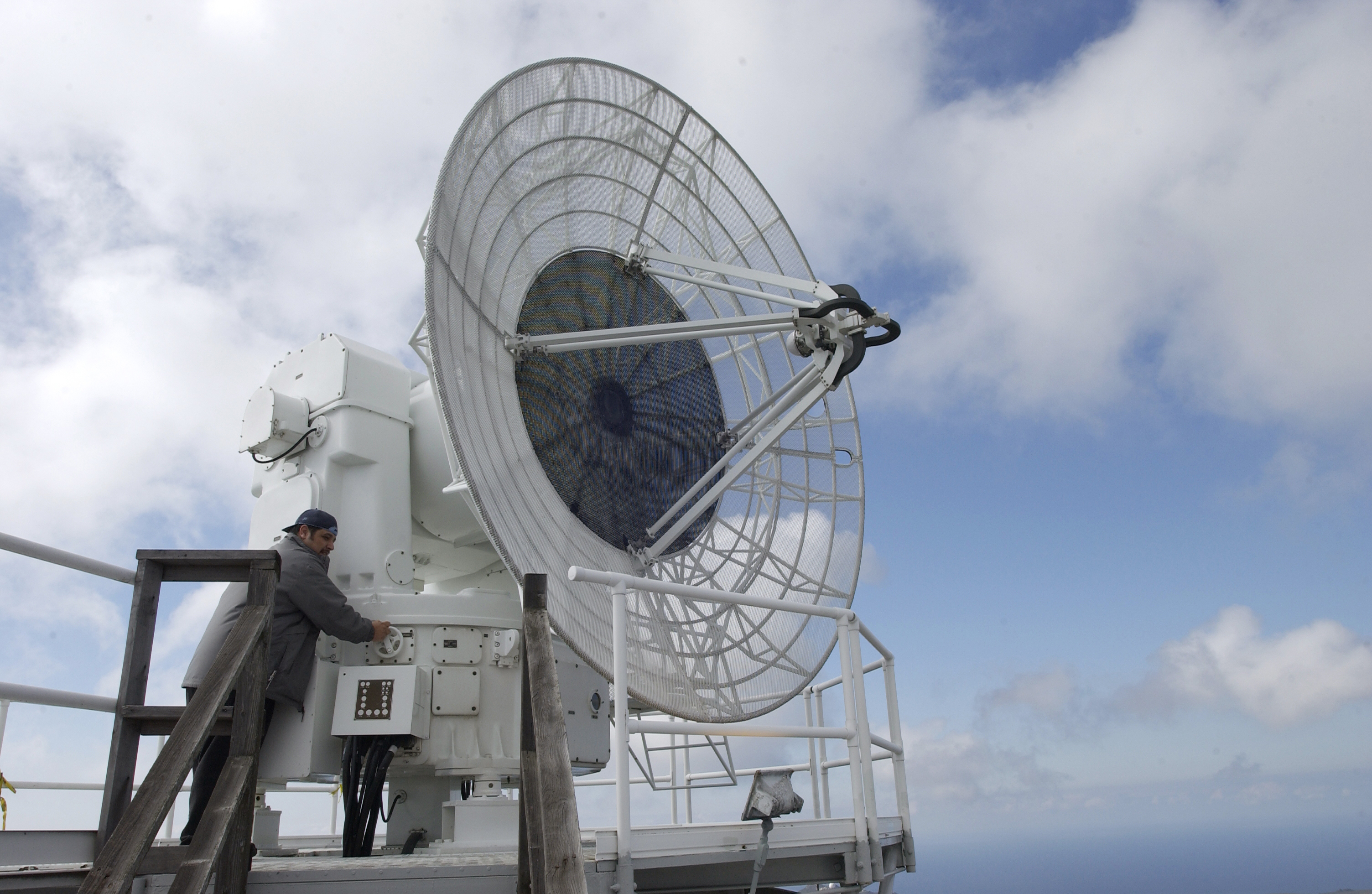
The FPS-16 radar sits atop Tranquillon Peak overlooking all of Vandenberg Air Force Base in California, including Space Launch Complex-6, and the shoreline. Tranquillon Peak's elevation of 2,126 feet (648 m) is the highest point on Vandenberg AFB. The radar provides data and range safety for missile launches. This radar, along with its data system, is used for tracking the Minuteman III ICBM.

The AN/FPS-16 is a highly accurate ground-based monopulse single object tracking radar (SOTR), used extensively by the NASA crewed space program, the U.S. Air Force and the U.S. Army. The accuracy of Radar Set AN/FPS-16 is such that the position data obtained from point-source targets has azimuth and elevation angular errors of less than 0.1 milliradian (approximately 0.006 degree) and range errors of less than 5 yards (5 m) with a signal-to-noise ratio of 20 decibels or greater.

== Classification of radar systems ==
In accordance with the Joint Electronics Type Designation System (JETDS), all U.S. military electronics are assigned a unique identifying alphanumeric designation. The letters “AN” (for Army-Navy) are placed ahead of a three-letter code.

- The first letter of the three-letter code denotes the type of platform hosting the electronic device, where A is used for Aircraft, F for Fixed (land-based), S for Ship-mounted, T for Ground transportable, etc.
- The second letter indicates the type of equipment, where P is used for Radar (pulsed), Q for Sonar, and R for Radio, etc.
- The third letter indicates the function or purpose of the device, where G means Fire control, R means Receiving, S means Search, and T means Transmitting, and so on.

Thus, the "AN/FPS-16" designation represents the 16th design of an Army-Navy “Fixed, Radar, Search” electronic device.

== FPS-16 Monopulse Tracking Radar ==
The first monopulse radar was developed at the Naval Research Laboratory (NRL) in 1943 to overcome the angular limitations of existing designs. The monopulse technique makes angular determinations simultaneously on each individual received pulse. This improvement in radar technology provides a tenfold increase in angular accuracy over previous fire and missile control radars at longer ranges. The monopulse radar is now the basis for all modern tracking and missile control radars. Although monopulse radar was developed independently and secretly in several countries, Robert Morris Page at the NRL is generally credited with the invention and holds the U.S. patent on this technique.

The monopulse technique was first applied to the Nike-Ajax missile system, an early U.S. continental air defense weapon. Many improvements were made to provide a more compact and efficient monopulse antenna feed and lobe comparison waveguide circuitry, such that monopulse tracking radar became the generally accepted tracking radar system for military and civilian agencies, such as NASA and the FAA.

The NRL's work on monopulse radars eventually led to the AN/FPS-16, developed jointly by NRL and RCA as the first radar designed especially for missile ranges. The AN/FPS-16 was used to guide the first U.S. space satellite launches, Explorer 1 and Vanguard 1, at Cape Canaveral in 1958.

== FPS-16 and Project Mercury ==
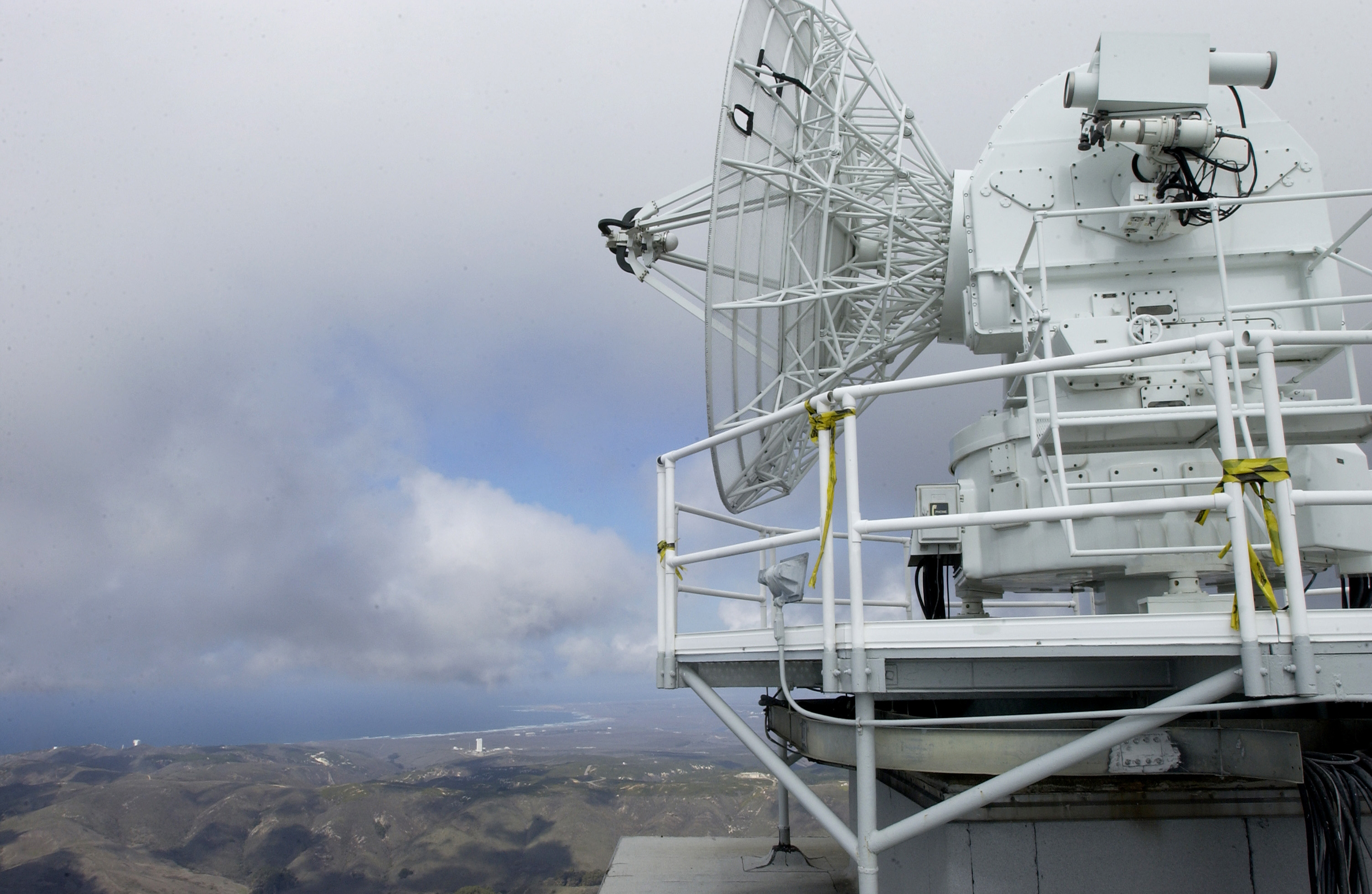
The FPS-16 radar at Vandenberg AFB, California has been used for tracking NASA space vehicles since the 1960s.

The C-band monopulse tracking radar (AN/FPS-16) used in the Project Mercury was inherently more accurate than its S-band conically scanned counterpart, the Very Long Range Tracking (VERLORT) radar system. The AN/FPS-16 radar system was introduced at the Atlantic Missile Test Range with installations including Cape Canaveral, Grand Bahama, San Salvador, Ascension and East Grand Bahama Island between 1958 and 1961. The FPS-16 located on the Australian Weapons Research Establishment Range at Woomera, in South Australia was also linked to the NASA network for Mercury and later missions. NASA Acq aid and telemetry systems were co-located with the Australian radar.

To obtain reliability in providing accurate trajectory data, the Mercury spacecraft was equipped with C-band and S-band cooperative beacons. The ground radar systems had to be compatible with the spacecraft radar beacons. The FPS-16 radar in use at most national missile ranges was selected to meet the C-band requirement. Although it originally had a range capability of only 250 nautical miles (460 km), most of the FPS-16 radar units selected for the project had been modified for operation up to 500 nautical miles (900 km), a NASA requirement, and modification kits were obtained for the remaining systems. In addition to the basic radar system, it was also necessary to provide the required data-handling equipment to allow data to be transmitted from all sites to the computers.

The FPS-16 system originally planned for the Project Mercury tracking network did not have adequate displays and controls for reliably acquiring the spacecraft in the acquisition time available. Consequently, a contract was negotiated with a manufacturer to provide the instrumentation radar acquisition (IRACQ, Increased RAnge Acquisition) modifications. For the near earth spacecraft involved a major limitation of the FPS-16 was its mechanical range gear box, a wonderful piece of engineering. However, for a target at a range typically, say, 700 nautical miles (1,300 km; 810 mi) at acquisition of signal [AOS], the radar was tracking second time around, that is, the pulse received in this interpulse period was that due to the previously transmitted pulse, and it would be indicating a range of 700 nmi (1,300 km; 810 mi). As the range closed the return pulse became closer and closer to the time at which the next transmitter pulse should occur. If they were allowed to coincide, remembering that the transmit-receive switch disconnected the receive (Rx) and connected the transmit (Tx) to the antenna at that instant, track would be lost. So, IRACQ provided an electronic ranging system, the function of which was to provide the necessary gating pulses to the Az and El receiver channels so that the system would maintain angle track. The system utilized a voltage controlled crystal oscillator [VCXO] as the clock generator for the range counters. An early/late gate system derived an error voltage which either increased [for a closing target] or decreased [for an opening target] the clock frequency, thus causing the gates to be generated so as to track the target. It also, when the target reached an indicated range of less than 16,000 yd (15 km), took over the generation of transmitter trigger pulses and delayed these by 16,000 yd (15 km), thus enabling the received pulses to pass through the Big Bang, as it was called, of normally timed Tx pulses. The radar operator, would, while IRACQ maintained angle track be slewing the range system from minimum range to maximum so as to regain track of the target at its true range of <500 nmi (900 km). As the target passed through point of closest approach (PCA) and increased in range the process was repeated at maximum range indication. The most difficult passes were those in which the orbit was such that the target came to PCA at a range of, say 470 nmi. That pass required the radar operator to work very hard as the radar closed, and then opened in range through the Big Bang in short order. The IRACQ Console contained a C-scope associated with which was a small joy stick which gave C-scope operator control of the antenna angle servo systems so that he could adjust the pointing angle to acquire the signal. IRACQ included a scan generator which drove the antenna in one of several pre-determined search patterns around the nominal pointing position, it being desirable that IRACQ acquire the target as early as possible. An essential feature of this modification is that it allows examination of all incoming video signals and allows establishment of angle-only track. Once the spacecraft has been acquired, in angle range. Other features of the IRACQ system included additional angle scan modes and radar phasing controls to permit multiple radar interrogation of the spacecraft beacon. The addition of a beacon local oscillator wave meter permitted the determination of spacecraft-transmitter frequency drift.

Early in the installation program, it was realized that the range of the Bermuda FPS-16 should be increased beyond 500 miles (800 km). With the 500-mile (800 km)-range limitation, it was possible to track the spacecraft for only 30 seconds prior to launch-vehicle sustainer engine cut-off (SECO) during the critical insertion phase. By extending the range capability to 1,000 miles (2,000 km), the spacecraft could be acquired earlier, and additional data could be provided to the Bermuda computer and flight dynamics consort. This modification also increased the probability of having valid data available to make a go/no-go decision after SECO.

The VERLORT radar fulfilled the S-band requirement with only a few modifications. Significant ones were the addition of specific angle-track capability and additional angular scan modes. At Eglin Air Force Base in Florida, the MPQ-31 radar was used for S-band tracking by extending its range capability to meet Project Mercury requirements. The data-handling equipment was essentially the same as for the FPS-16. Coordinate conversion and transmitting equipment was installed at Eglin to allow both the MPQ-31 and the FPS-16 to supply three-coordinate designate data to the Atlantic Missile Range (AMR) radars via central analog data distributing and computing (CADDAC).

== C-Band Radar Transponder ==
The C-Band Radar Transponder (Model SST-135C) is intended to increase the range and accuracy of the radar ground stations equipped with AN/FPS-16, and AN/FPQ-6 Radar Systems. C-band radar stations at the Kennedy Space Center, along the Atlantic Missile Range, and at many other locations around the world, provide global tracking capabilities. Beginning with Vehicles 204 and 501, two C-band radar transponders will be carried in the instrumentation unit (IU) to provide radar tracking capabilities independent of the vehicle attitude. This arrangement is more reliable than the antenna switching circuits necessary if only one transponder would be used.

=== Transponder operation ===
The transponder receives coded or single pulse interrogation from ground stations and transmits a single-pulse reply in the same frequency band. A common antenna is used for receiving and transmitting. The transponder consists of five functional systems: superheterodyne receiver, decoder, modulator, transmitter, and power supply. The duplexer (a 4-port ferromagnetic circulator) provides isolation between receiver and transmitter. Interrogating pulses are directed from the antenna to the receiver, and reply pulses are directed from the transmitter to the antenna. The preselector, consisting of three coaxial cavities, attenuates all RF signals outside the receiving band. The received signal is heterodyned to a 50 MHz intermediate frequency in the mixer and amplified in the IF amplifier which also contains the detector. In case of coded transmission, the decoder module provides a pulse output only if the correct spacing exists between pulse pairs received. The shaped-pulse output of the decoder is directed to the modulator which converts it into a high-power, precisely shaped and precisely delayed pulse which is applied to the magnetron to produce the reply pulse. Six telemetry outputs are provided: input signal level, input pulse repetition frequency (PRF), temperature, incident power, reflected power, and reply PRF.

Semiconductors are used in all circuitry, with the exception of the local oscillator and magnetron.

== Radar ground station operation ==
The radar ground stations determine the position of the vehicle C-band transponder by measuring range, azimuth angle, and elevation angle. Range is derived from pulse travel time, and angle tracking is accomplished by amplitude-comparison monopulse techniques. As many as four radar stations may track the beacon simultaneously.

== NASA Manned Space Flight Network (MSFN) C-band Radar ==
The NASA Manned Space Flight Network (MSFN) land based C-band pulse radar types consist of the AN/FPS-16, AN/MPS-39, AN/FPQ-6 and the AN/TPQ-18. The MPS-39 is a transportable instrument using space-fed-phased-array technology; the TPQ-18, a transportable version of the FPQ-6. The indicator AN (originally "Army–Navy") does not necessarily mean that the Army, Navy or Air Force use the equipment, but simply that the type nomenclature was assigned according to the military nomenclature system. The meaning of the three letter prefixes; FPS, MPS, FPQ and TPQ are:

- FPS - fixed; radar; detecting and/or range and bearing
- MPS - ground, mobile; radar; detecting and/or range and bearing
- FPQ - fixed; radar; special, or combination of purposes
- TPQ - ground, transportable; radar; special, or combination of purposes.

AN/FPS-16 RADAR SET
TYPICAL TECHNICAL SPECIFICATIONS
------------------------

Type of presentation: Dual-trace CRT,
   A/R and R type displays.

Transmitter data -
   Nominal Power: 1 MW peak (fixed-frequency magnetron); 
                  250 kW peak (tunable magnetron).
   Frequency
      Fixed: 5480 plus or minus 30 MHz
      Tunable: 5450 to 5825 MHz

Pulse repetition frequency (internal):
   341, 366, 394, 467, 569, 682, 732, 853,
   1024, 1280, 1364 or 1707 pulses per second

Pulse width: 0.25, 0.50, 1.0 μs

Code groups: 5 pulses max, within 0.001 duty cycle limitation of transmitter.

Radar receiver data -
   Noise Figure: 11 dB
   Intermediate Frequency: 30 MHz
   Bandwidth: 8 MHz
   Narrow Bandwidth: 2 MHz
   Dynamic Range of Gain Control: 93 dB

Gate width
   Tracking: 0.5 μs, 0.75 μs, 1.25 μs
   Acquisition: 1.0 μs, 1.25 μs, 1.75 μs

Coverage
   Range: 500 to {{convert|400000|yd|m|-5|abbr=on}}
   Azimuth: 360° continuous
   Elevation: minus 10 to plus 190 degrees

Servo bandwidth
   Range: 1 to 10 Hz (var)
   Angle: 0.25 to 5 Hz (var)

Operating power requirements: 115 V AC,
   60 Hz, 50 kV·A, 3 phase

== Principles of operation ==
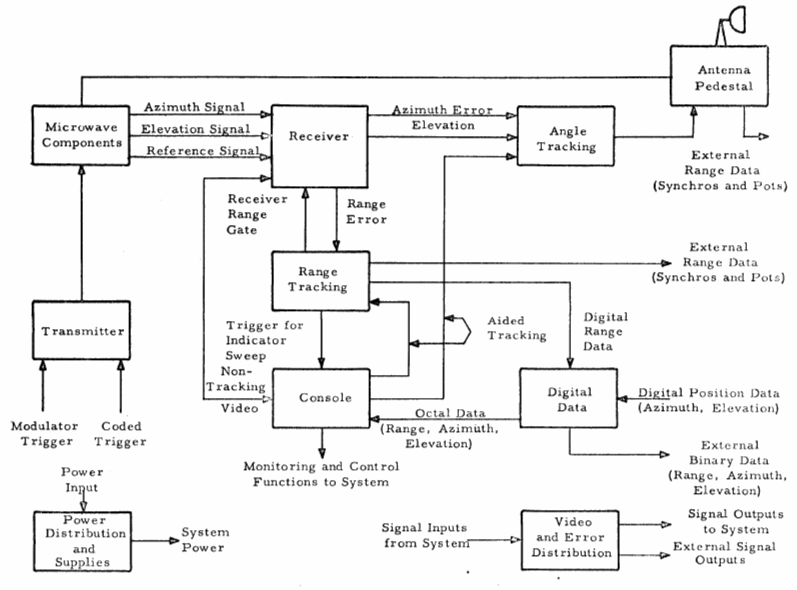
AN/FPS-16 Radar Set block diagram.

The AN/FPS-16 is a C-band monopulse radar utilizing a waveguide hybrid-labyrinth comparator to develop angle track information. The comparator receives RF signals from an array of four feed horns which are located at the focal point of a 12-foot (4 m) parabolic reflector. The comparator performs vector addition and subtraction of the energy received by each horn. The elevation tracking data is generated in the comparator as the difference between the sums of the top two horns. The azimuth tracking error is the difference between the sums of the two vertical horn pairs. The vectorial sums of all four horns is combined in a third channel. Three mixers with a common local oscillator, and three 30 MHz IF strips are used; one each for the azimuth, elevation, and sum signals.

The same four-horn cluster is used for RF transmission. The transmitter output is delivered to the comparator labyrinth, which now acts to divide the outgoing power equally between all four horns. The receivers are protected by TR tubes during the transmit time.

The horn cluster is located approximately at the focal point of a 12-foot (4 m) parabolic reflector. During the transmission cycle, the energy is distributed equally among the four horns. During the receive cycle, the outputs of the elevation and azimuth comparator arms represent the amount of angular displacement between the target position and electrical axis. Consider an off-axis target - the image is displaced from the focal point, and the difference in signal intensity at the face of the horns is indicative of angular displacement. An on-target condition will cause equal and in-phase signals at each of the four horns and zero output from the elevation and azimuth arms.

The sum, azimuth, and elevation signals are converted to 30 MHz IF signals and amplified. The phases of the elevation and azimuth signals are then compared with the sum signal to determine error polarity. These errors are detected, commutated, amplified, and used to control the antenna-positioning servos. A part of the reference signal is detected and used as a video range tracking signal and as the video scope display. A highly precise antenna mount is required to maintain the accuracy of the angle system.

The FPS-16 antenna pedestal is a precision-machined item, engineered to close tolerances, assembled in dust-free, air-conditioned rooms to prevent warping during mechanical assembly. The pedestal is mounted on a reinforced concrete tower to provide mechanical rigidity. The electronic equipment is mounted in a two-story concrete building, which surrounds the tower to decrease tower warping due to solar radiation.

The radar utilizes a 12-foot (4 m) parabolic antenna giving a beamwidth of 1.2 degrees at the half-power points. The range system uses 1.0, 0.5, or 0.25-microsecond wide pulses. Pulse width and prf can be set by pushbuttons. Twelve repetition frequencies between 341 and 1707 pulses per second can be selected. A jack is provided through which the modulator can be pulsed by an external source. By means of external modulation, a code of 1 to 5 pulses may be used.

Data rake-offs are provided for potentiometer, synchro, and digital information in all three coordinates. The azimuth and elevation digital data is derived from optical-type analog-to-digital encoders. Two geared coders with ambiguity resolution are used for each parameter. The data for each angle is a Gray code 17-bit word in serial form. The overlapping ambiguity bits are removed, and the data is transformed from cyclic Gray code to straight binary before recording for transmission to the computer. The range servo presents a 20-bit straight binary word in serial form after ambiguity resolution and code conversion. The same type optical encoders are used.

The AN/FPS-16 antenna pedestal is mounted on a 12-by-12-foot (4 by 4 m) concrete tower which extends 27 feet (8 m) above grade level. The center of the emplaced antenna is approximately 36 feet (11 m) above grade level. The electronic equipment, auxiliary system, maintenance section, etc., are housed in a 66 by 30 by 24 ft (20×9×7 m) two-story concrete block building. The building surrounds, but is not attached to, the pedestal tower. This method of construction places the tower within the air conditioned environment of the equipment building and provides protection from solar radiation and other weather effects which would dilute the inherent accuracy of the system. Power requirements for each station are: 120/208 volts, ±10 volts, 4-wire, 60 Hz; 175 kV·A.

== Models of the AN/FPS-16 ==
The AN/FPS-16 and AN/FPQ-6 are C-band tracking radar systems. Their key characteristics are compared in the following table.

Radar Ground Station Characteristics
	AN/FPS-16	AN/FPQ-6
Frequency band	5.4–5.9 GHz (5.6–5.1 cm)	5.4–5.9 GHz (5.6–5.1 cm)
Peak power	1.3 MW	3.0 MW
Antenna size	13 ft (3.9 m)	30 ft (9.2 m)
Antenna gain	47 dB	52 dB
Receiver noise figure	6.5 dB	8 db
Angle precision (units)	0.15	0.1
Range precision	15 ft (4.5 m)	9.8 ft (3.0 m)

== AN/FPS-16 (XN-I) ==
The first experimental model was made with an X-band RF system and a lens-type antenna. It later was changed to C-band with a reflector antenna. This radar was further modified for use on Vanguard and is now installed at the Atlantic Missile Range, Patrick AFB, Florida.

== AN/FPS-16 (XN-2) ==
Two of this model were made. One was installed on Grand Bahama Island, BWI, and one remained at RCA (now Lockheed Martin), Moorestown, N.J. These radars are almost identical to later production models.

== AN/FPS-16 (XN-3) ==
This was an experimental version of AN/FPS-16 (XN-2) that includes a 3-megawatt modification kit, a circular polarization kit, a data correction kit, and a boresight television kit. This radar was installed at RCA, Moorestown, N.J.

== AN/FPS-16AX ==
This is a production AN/FPS-16 modified according to (XN-3). Three radars located at White Sands Missile Range, and one located at Moorestown, New Jersey, have been so modified. AN/MPS-25 is the nomenclature of a trailer-mounted production model AN/FPS-16.

== AN/FPQ-4 ==
This is an adaptation of AN/FPS-16 that was made for use as a target tracker in the land-based Talos system. Two models were installed at WSMR. Two more models, with modifications, were installed on a ship for use in the Atlantic Missile Range on the Project DAMP. A fifth such radar was installed at RCA, Moorestown, N.J. as a part of the Project DAMP research facility.

AN/FPS-16 Radar, Principle Components and Physical Characteristics
Components	QTY	Dimensions (in/cm)	Unit Weight
Amplifier Electronic Control; AM-1751/FPS-16	1	3.1 in × 3.7 in × 10.4 in (7.9 cm × 9.4 cm × 26.4 cm)	6 lb (2.7 kg)
Tuning Drive; TG-55/FPS-16	1	3.1 in × 3.1 in × 10 in (7.9 cm × 7.9 cm × 25.4 cm)	3 lb (1.4 kg)
Control Electrical Frequency; C-2278/FPS-16	1	3.7 in × 4.7 in × 19.2 in (9.4 cm × 11.9 cm × 48.8 cm)	6 lb (2.7 kg)
Control Amplifier; C-2276/FPS-16	1	3.7 in × 1.7 in × 17.2 in (9.4 cm × 4.3 cm × 43.7 cm)	5 lb (2.3 kg)
Amplifier Filament Supply	13	3.7 in × 3.7 in × 5 in (9.4 cm × 9.4 cm × 12.7 cm)	1 lb (0.45 kg)
Angle Compensation Amplifier; Azimuth & Elevation)	2	8.2 in × 15.5 in × 19.5 in (21 cm × 39 cm × 50 cm)	24 lb (11 kg)
Angle Control Unit; AM-1760/FPS-16	1	8.2 in × 15.5 in × 19.5 in (21 cm × 39 cm × 50 cm)	20 lb (9.1 kg)
Angle Error Amplifier; Azimuth & Elevation	2	8.2 in × 13.7 in × 19.5 in (21 cm × 35 cm × 50 cm)	21 lb (9.5 kg)
Angle Servo Preamplifier; Azimuth Servo; Elevation Servo	2	2.5 in × 6 in × 19.5 in (6.4 cm × 15.2 cm × 49.5 cm)	10 lb (4.5 kg)
Angle Summing Amplifier; Azimuth & Elevation	2	12.2 in × 15.5 in × 19.5 in (31 cm × 39 cm × 50 cm)	24 lb (11 kg)
Azimuth Driver Amplifier; AM-1759/FPS-16	1	8.2 in × 13.7 in × 19.5 in (21 cm × 35 cm × 50 cm)	21 lb (9.5 kg)
Air Conditioner	1	32 in × 56 in × 73 in (81 cm × 142 cm × 185 cm)	1,500 lb (680 kg)
Air Conditioner	1	18 in × 72 in × 76 in (46 cm × 183 cm × 193 cm)	1,500 lb (680 kg)

== Upgrade Modifications ==
Significant improvements and updates were incorporated in numerous AN/FPS-16 & TPQ-18 systems through and beyond the 1960s.

=== Digital Ranging Machine (DIRAM, ADRAN) ===
The electro-mechanical range servo tracking machine was replaced with a hard-wired digital logic Range tracking subsystem (a couple of generations). Analog receiver inputs of early-late gate range error signals integrated to produce count-up/down increments to the Range Counter which was decoded to produce tracking gates and display triggers to about ~5.25 MHz (~190 nSec) resolution. Similar counting and decoding was used to generate transmit timing (T0, PRF, etc.). Some higher resolution timing was generated with a tapped delay-line technique.

=== Doppler Velocity Extraction System (DVES) ===
This modification included the Digital Ranging modification, added a general purpose digital computer and a sub-set of the AN/FPQ-6 CSP (coherent signal processor) Doppler Velocity tracking sub-system (see AN/FPQ-6). The FPS-16 (and MPS-36) omitted CSP function was the received signal I&Q IF integration in very narrow crystal filters. The coherent transmit and LO receive and Doppler Velocity tracking servo loops were included for clean un-ambiguous velocity data. The general purpose digital computer provided the pulse doppler ambiguity resolution filtering, implemented the angle servo loop-closure for Az-El tracking, and other functions.

== See also ==
- List of radars
- List of military electronics of the United States
