= Electoral results for the district of Eastwood =

Election results for Eastwood, New South Wales, Australia

Eastwood, an electoral district of the Legislative Assembly in the Australian state of New South Wales had two incarnations, from 1927 to 1930, and from 1950 to 1999.

First incarnation (1927–1930)
Election	Member	Party
1927	David Anderson	Nationalist
Second incarnation (1950–1999)
Election	Member	Party
1950	Eric Hearnshaw	Liberal
1953	Eric Hearnshaw	Liberal
1956	Eric Hearnshaw	Liberal
1959	Eric Hearnshaw	Liberal
1962	Eric Hearnshaw	Liberal
1965	Jim Clough	Liberal
1968	Jim Clough	Liberal
1971	Jim Clough	Liberal
1973	Jim Clough	Liberal
1976	Jim Clough	Liberal
1978	Jim Clough	Liberal
1981	Jim Clough	Liberal
1984	Jim Clough	Liberal
1988	Andrew Tink	Liberal
1991	Andrew Tink	Liberal
1995	Andrew Tink	Liberal

== Election results ==
=== Elections in the 1990s ===
==== 1995 ====
1995 New South Wales state election: Eastwood
Party	Candidate	Votes	%	±%
Liberal	Andrew Tink	18,867	55.7	−6.7
Labor	Steve Gurney	8,981	26.5	+1.6
Greens	Alex Lepelaar	2,124	6.3	+6.3
Democrats	Chris Dunkerley	2,051	6.1	−2.7
Against Further Immigration	Rodney Smith	1,667	4.9	+4.9
Natural Law	Tim Carr	192	0.6	+0.6
Total formal votes		33,882	96.3	+2.9
Informal votes		1,306	3.7	−2.9
Turnout		35,188	93.6	
Two-party-preferred result
Liberal	Andrew Tink	20,649	64.2	−4.5
Labor	Steve Gurney	11,507	35.8	+4.5
Liberal hold		Swing	−4.5	

==== 1991 ====
1991 New South Wales state election: Eastwood
Party	Candidate	Votes	%	±%
Liberal	Andrew Tink	20,341	62.4	−0.9
Labor	John Quessy	8,133	24.9	−2.7
Democrats	Chris Dunkerley	2,856	8.8	−0.4
Independent	Zero-Population-Growth	1,291	4.0	+4.0
Total formal votes		32,621	93.4	−3.8
Informal votes		2,319	6.6	+3.8
Turnout		34,940	94.1	
Two-party-preferred result
Liberal	Andrew Tink	21,609	68.7	+1.4
Labor	John Quessy	9,850	31.3	−1.4
Liberal hold		Swing	+1.4	

=== Elections in the 1980s ===
==== 1988 ====
1988 New South Wales state election: Eastwood
Party	Candidate	Votes	%	±%
Liberal	Andrew Tink	18,660	63.3	+3.6
Labor	Colleen Logan	7,881	26.7	−5.2
Democrats	Christopher Dunkerley	2,958	10.0	+1.6
Total formal votes		29,499	97.1	−1.1
Informal votes		877	2.9	+1.1
Turnout		30,376	93.9	
Two-party-preferred result
Liberal	Andrew Tink	19,635	67.6	+3.1
Labor	Colleen Logan	9,400	32.4	−3.1
Liberal hold		Swing	+3.1	

==== 1984 ====
1984 New South Wales state election: Eastwood
Party	Candidate	Votes	%	±%
Liberal	Jim Clough	17,937	60.0	+5.0
Labor	Joyce Tuckwell	9,404	31.5	−5.3
Democrats	Christopher Dunkerley	2,545	8.5	+0.2
Total formal votes		29,886	98.2	+0.5
Informal votes		548	1.8	−0.5
Turnout		30,434	93.3	+1.0
Two-party-preferred result
Liberal	Jim Clough		64.8	+5.1
Labor	Joyce Tuckwell		35.2	−5.1
Liberal hold		Swing	+5.1	

==== 1981 ====
1981 New South Wales state election: Eastwood
Party	Candidate	Votes	%	±%
Liberal	Jim Clough	15,857	55.0	+3.6
Labor	Jeff Shaw	10,601	36.8	−5.7
Democrats	Peter Chambers	2,387	8.3	+2.3
Total formal votes		28,845	97.7	
Informal votes		685	2.3	
Turnout		29,530	92.3	
Two-party-preferred result
Liberal	Jim Clough	16,857	59.7	+5.2
Labor	Jeff Shaw	11,401	40.3	−5.2
Liberal hold		Swing	+5.2	

=== Elections in the 1970s ===
==== 1978 ====
1978 New South Wales state election: Eastwood
Party	Candidate	Votes	%	±%
Liberal	Jim Clough	15,715	51.4	−13.3
Labor	Jan Murray	12,992	42.5	+7.2
Democrats	Phillip Cockell	1,846	6.0	+6.0
Total formal votes		30,553	98.3	−0.5
Informal votes		537	1.7	+0.5
Turnout		31,090	92.8	−1.4
Two-party-preferred result
Liberal	Jim Clough	16,638	54.5	−10.2
Labor	Jan Murray	13,915	45.5	+10.2
Liberal hold		Swing	−10.2	

==== 1976 ====
1976 New South Wales state election: Eastwood
Party	Candidate	Votes	%	±%
Liberal	Jim Clough	19,875	64.7	+2.2
Labor	Robert Cummins	10,865	35.3	+35.3
Total formal votes		30,740	98.8	+1.5
Informal votes		380	1.2	−1.5
Turnout		31,120	94.2	+1.4
Liberal hold		Swing	−1.7	

==== 1973 ====
1973 New South Wales state election: Eastwood
Party	Candidate	Votes	%	±%
Liberal	Jim Clough	17,980	62.5	+3.3
Australia	John Butterworth	7,956	27.7	+27.7
Democratic Labor	Paul Burton	2,834	9.8	+9.8
Total formal votes		28,770	97.3	
Informal votes		788	2.7	
Turnout		29,558	92.8	
Two-candidate-preferred result
Liberal	Jim Clough	19,397	67.4	−0.9
Australia	John Butterworth	9,373	32.6	+32.6
Liberal hold		Swing	−0.9	

==== 1971 ====
1971 New South Wales state election: Eastwood
Party	Candidate	Votes	%	±%
Liberal	Jim Clough	15,491	59.2	−10.5
Labor	John McMahon	8,211	31.4	+1.1
Independent	Olwyn Mackenzie	2,454	9.4	+9.4
Total formal votes		26,156	98.1	
Informal votes		518	1.9	
Turnout		26,674	93.0	
Two-party-preferred result
Liberal	Jim Clough	16,960	64.8	−4.9
Labor	John McMahon	9,196	35.2	+4.9
Liberal hold		Swing	−4.9	

=== Elections in the 1960s ===
==== 1968 ====
1968 New South Wales state election: Eastwood
Party	Candidate	Votes	%	±%
Liberal	Jim Clough	17,589	69.7	+16.2
Labor	George Keniry	7,636	30.3	+4.6
Total formal votes		25,225	97.0	
Informal votes		773	3.0	
Turnout		25,998	94.1	
Liberal hold		Swing	+3.0	

==== 1965 ====
1965 New South Wales state election: Eastwood
Party	Candidate	Votes	%	±%
Liberal	Jim Clough	15,264	53.5	−13.7
Labor	George Keniry	7,323	25.7	−7.1
Independent	Marion Hearnshaw	4,569	16.0	+16.0
Democratic Labor	Doris Brauer	1,361	4.8	+4.8
Total formal votes		28,517	98.5	−0.5
Informal votes		441	1.5	+0.5
Turnout		28,958	93.6	−0.4
Two-party-preferred result
Liberal	Jim Clough	19,551	68.6	+1.4
Labor	George Keniry	8,966	31.4	−1.4
Liberal hold		Swing	+1.4	

==== 1962 ====
1962 New South Wales state election: Eastwood
Party	Candidate	Votes	%	±%
Liberal	Eric Hearnshaw	18,137	67.2	−0.5
Labor	Robert Mayhew	8,833	32.8	+0.5
Total formal votes		26,970	99.0	
Informal votes		282	1.0	
Turnout		27,252	94.0	
Liberal hold		Swing	−0.5	

=== Elections in the 1950s ===
==== 1959 ====
1959 New South Wales state election: Eastwood
Party	Candidate	Votes	%	±%
Liberal	Eric Hearnshaw	17,702	72.7	
Labor	William Browne	6,649	27.3	
Total formal votes		24,351	98.8	
Informal votes		298	1.2	
Turnout		24,649	93.6	
Liberal hold		Swing		

==== 1956 ====
1956 New South Wales state election: Eastwood
Party	Candidate	Votes	%	±%
Liberal	Eric Hearnshaw	unopposed		
Liberal hold				

==== 1953 ====
1953 New South Wales state election: Eastwood
Party	Candidate	Votes	%	±%
Liberal	Eric Hearnshaw	12,757	59.0	
Labor	Francis Corcoran	5,525	25.6	
Independent	Francis Collings	3,335	15.4	
Total formal votes		21,617	98.4	
Informal votes		340	1.6	
Turnout		21,957	93.2	
Two-party-preferred result
Liberal	Eric Hearnshaw	15,132	70.0	
Labor	Francis Corcoran	6,485	30.0	
Liberal hold		Swing		

==== 1950 ====
1950 New South Wales state election: Eastwood
Party	Candidate	Votes	%	±%
Liberal	Eric Hearnshaw	14,275	71.4	
Labor	John Birchall	5,712	28.6	
Total formal votes		19,987	98.2	
Informal votes		360	1.8	
Turnout		20,347	92.2	
Liberal notional hold				

District recreated

==== 1930 - 1950 ====
District abolished

=== Elections in the 1920s ===
==== 1927 ====
1927 New South Wales state election: Eastwood
Party	Candidate	Votes	%	±%
Nationalist	David Anderson	7,770	65.5	
Labor	Alan McNamara	3,630	30.6	
Protestant Labour	William Featherstone	463	3.9	
Total formal votes		11,863	98.8	
Informal votes		143	1.2	
Turnout		12,006	81.7	
Nationalist win		(new seat)		
