= AN/FPQ-6 =

US long-range C-band instrumentation radar

The AN/FPQ-6 is a fixed, land-based C-band radar system used for long-range, small-target tracking. The AN/FPQ-6 instrumentation radar located at the NASA Kennedy Space Center was the principal C-Band tracking radar system for the Apollo program.

In accordance with the Joint Electronics Type Designation System (JETDS), the "AN/FPQ-6" designation represents the 6th design of an Army-Navy electronic device for stationary ground radar special or combination equipment. The JETDS system is now used to name all Department of Defense and select NATO electronic systems.

RCA Corporation's Missile and Surface Radar Division developed the FPQ-6 skin tracking C-Band radar as a successor to the AN/FPS-16 radar. The FPQ-6 can provide continuous spherical coordinate information at ranges of 32,000 nautical miles (37,000 mi; 59,000 km) with an accuracy of plus or minus 6 feet (1.8 m). The AN/FPS-16 was range limited to 500 nmi (580 mi; 930 km) with an accuracy of 15 ft (4.6 m), although it could be modified to a maximum range of 5,000 nmi (5,800 mi; 9,300 km).

== Radar ground station characteristics ==
	AN/FPQ-6	AN/FPS-16
Frequency	5.4–5.9 GHz (5.6–5.1 cm)	5.4–5.9 GHz (5.6–5.1 cm)
Peak power	2.8 MW	1.3 MW
Antenna size	29 feet (8.8 m)	13 feet (3.9 m)
Antenna gain	51 dB	47 dB
Receiver noise figure	7.5 dB	6.5 dB
Angle precision (units)	0.1	0.15
Range precision	9.8 feet (3 m)	15 feet (4.5 m)

The AN/FPQ-6 radar employed a 2.8 megawatt peak power (4.8 kilowatt average), broad band transmitter with a frequency stability of 1×10^{8}. The 29-foot diameter parabolic antenna, using a Cassegrain antenna feed, had a 0.4° beamwidth and a gain of 51 decibels. Its monopulse, 5 horn feed system permitted the reference and error antenna patterns to have their gains independently established as well as the slope of the error patterns optimized while supplying target return signals to the receiving system with a minimum of insertion loss.

The three channel signal outputs of the antenna feed system were supplied directly to the receiving system without undergoing any additional loss-inducing signal manipulation with bandwidths optimized for the specified pulse widths of 0.5, 0.75, 1.0 and 2.4 microseconds and the receiver noise figure of 7.5 dB was improved to 3.5 dB through the addition of closed-cycle parametric RF amplifiers. This system ensured a dynamic range in excess of 120 dB.

The receiving system provided simultaneous presentation of the skin and beacon returns to the console operator so that skin tracking could be used if the beacon signal was lost.

The antenna pedestal was a high precision, two-axis mount, using a hydrostatic bearing in azimuth and phase roller bearings in elevation providing mobility and support to the counterbalanced, solid surface antenna. The antenna was positioned through anti-backlash dual drive pedestal gearing via a high torque-to-inertia electro-hydraulic valve motor system. A viscous coupling unit located between the valve motor and pedestal drive gearing damped out undesired mechanical resonances.

The AN/FPQ-6 had a self-contained digital computer, an RCA FC-4101, whose primary purpose was to correct dynamic lag in the angular output data. As designed, both the AN/FPQ-6 and AN/TPQ-18 radars were provided with a built-in data processor referred to as the RCA 4101 Computer.

The ground floor of the two story building contained the air-conditioning, transmitter heat exchanger controls, equipment load center data input junction box and ex-Mercury atomic time standard. The first floor contained the eight equipment racks, the console, and the 3 megawatt transmitter.

== Functional description ==
The AN/FPQ-6 missile test range instrumentation set is a fixed station long-range precision tracking system for tracking intercontinental ballistic missiles for range safety and range user's trajectory measurement data. It will also be used for tracking during staging and parking orbit (trilateration) of a synchronous satellite, The operational objective is to provide a fixed station radar capable of skin tracking a square metre target to ranges in excess of 300 nmi (560 km).

The FPQ-6 radar at Patrick Air Force Base, Florida, has a circular polarized antenna with a diameter of 29 ft (8.8 m) and a gain of 51 decibels. Transmitting with a peak power of 3 MW, at 1 μs pulse width, the 1.6 MHz (190 m) bandwidth receiver has a 4 dB noise figure. The system has an unambiguous range of 32,000 miles (28,000 nmi; 51,000 km). The nominal frequency range is 5.4 to 5.9 GHz (0.056 to 0.051 m).

== Coherent signal processor ==
At least two of the AN/FPQ-6 systems were given a coherent signal processor (CSP) modification. This added a synthesized transmit signal frequency and Local Oscillator frequency exciter, a traveling-wave tube (TWT) and crossed-field amplifier transmitter, an I/Q pulse-Doppler receiver with very narrow intermediate frequency (IF) crystal filters, a Doppler velocity sensor tracking servo loop that digitally tuned the LO synthesizer, a real-time digital computer program to resolve pulsed-doppler frequency/velocity ambiguity (compared to noisy range-rate data), a hardwired logic Doppler acquisition processor that generated time compressed ambiguous velocity and acceleration profiles for correlation against stored, time compressed, replayed I/Q received samples to detect the best match to initiate ambiguous track (until ambiguity resolution corrected the track).

== Operational description ==
The AN/FPQ 6 radar was built by RCA and was a development of the AN-FPS 16. It was an amplitude comparison monopulse C-band radar with a 2.8 MW peak klystron transmitter tunable from 5.4 to 5.8 GHz (5.6 to 5.2 cm), and had a 30 ft (9 m) parabolic antenna. The antenna had 52 dB gain, a 0.6 degree beam width utilizing a Cassegrain feed with a five horn monopulse comparator. The system had an unambiguous maximum range of 32,768 nautical miles (37,709 mi; 60,686 km) with uncooled parametric amplifiers and a system noise temperature of 440 K (167 °C; 332 °F) giving it a noise figure of 4 dB.

A major feature of the radar was its maximum unambiguous range, despite a pulse-repetition frequency (PRF) of some hundreds of pulses per second (160, 320, 640, sometimes 80 and 1280). To combine these two features requires that the radar carry out N^{th} time around tracking. That is, it had to be able to track an echo resulting from a transmitted pulse other than that sent as the start of the same PRF period in which the echo was received. In order to do so, the range system employed a 2-second time base allowing the system to determine the number of PRF periods elapsing before an echo, resulting from a particular transmit pulse (Tx) received. The range system carried out a find process, then a verify process before entering the auto-tracking mode.

The FIND process is first carried out where two successive Tx trigger pulses are delayed by a time equivalent to an RF wave go-and-return distance of 16,000 yards (15,000 m). Then the range gate triggers are delayed by an equivalent time. The delayed Tx trigger pulses are counted in a zone counter, until target video pulses are detected in the delayed range gates. At this point the zone counter contains the number of PRF periods corresponding to the N^{th} time around.

The VERIFY process mode is where one Tx pulse is delayed for a 16,000 yards (15,000 m) equivalent distance. The range gate in the zone determined in the earlier FIND mode is also delayed to match the Tx delay. This sequence is repeated until four video returns, from eight attempts, are received. When the four returns are detected, automatic tracking is maintained. The contents of the zone counter are added to the apparent range, the range reported in the current PRF period, to determine the actual range of the target. If, during the VERIFY process four returns are not found after eight tries the FIND process is re-initiated.

As an example, if a PRF of 142 PPS is assumed, and a target at a range of 4,883,072 yards (4,465,081 m) is to be acquired, the operator initiates the FIND mode. The system carries out that process by delaying triggers, and counting zones, and finds that the zone counter has stored a count of four. The VERIFY mode then takes place, resulting in confirmation of the zone count. The target will appear, on the radar display to be at a range of 265,200 yards (242,500 m). That is the difference between four PRF period equivalents plus the additional range. The range reported will be the actual target range of 4,883,072 yards (4,465,081 m), the figure displayed on the range read-out.

As the radar was designed to track moving objects the need arose to handle targets which, in closing or opening range during N^{th} time around tracking, came into coincidence with the next Tx pulse. So, the radar had to be capable of tracking “through the Big Bang” (aka the Main Bang). This arises from the fact that the antenna serves both the Tx and Rx. To allow this to happen a device called the transmit-receive switch (T/R switch) is used. The antenna is connected to the receiver until the transmitter is pulsed. The T/R switch detects the Tx pulse and transfers the antenna to transmit for the duration of the pulse. At the instant the receiver is disconnected from the antenna the range system will lose track.

In order for an N^{th} time around tracking system to work, there has to be some arrangement to cover the loss of received signal for the transmitted pulse period. In the FPQ-6, this is achieved when the target pulse reaches an apparent range of ±16,000 yards (15,000 m) of the Tx pulse, a number of Tx pulse being the zone count, are delayed by a time equivalent to 32,000 yards (29,000 m). In the above example, when the range of the target closes to 4,633,872 yards (4,237,213 m), that is 16,000 yards (15,000 m) greater than the 4 zones, the 32,000 yards (29,000 m) delay is introduced into the Tx system. After 4 pulses the delay is transferred into the range gate generation system, and the target continues to be tracked. After the target has reached a range of 4,601,872 yards (4,207,952 m), 4 zones minus 16,000 yards (15,000 m), the delay is removed from the system. At that point the range is such that the zone counter will have been decremented by 1 and the apparent range will be 1,138,468 yards (1,041,015 m), but with the target at a real range of 3 zones plus the apparent range. Obviously, for an opening target the zone counter will be incremented and the apparent range will be slightly more than 16 yards (15 m).

== See also ==
- AN/FPS-16 Instrumentation Radar
- List of radars
- List of military electronics of the United States
