= Peak power (disambiguation) =

Peak power refers to the maximum of the instantaneous power waveform.

Peak power may also refer to:

- the maximum power rating of electronic device
- Audio peak power, power handling in audio equipment
- Watt-peak in electrical generation systems
- Peaking power plant of electric utilities
