= Tom Reid (electrical engineer) =

Thomas Reid MBE
- Born: March 14, 1927; Glasgow, Scotland
- Died: October 2, 2010 (aged 83); Canberra, Australian Capital Territory, Australia
- Education: University of Glasgow
- Occupation: Electrical Engineer
- Spouse(s): Betty McKenna, Margaret McLachlan (Senator Margaret Reid)
- Children: 4 children

Director of Honeysuckle Creek Tracking Station
- In office 4 August 1967 – 3 April 1970

Thomas Reid MBE (14 March 1927 – 2 October 2010) was the director of the Honeysuckle Creek Tracking Station outside Canberra, Australia, which in July 1969 transmitted live television of Neil Armstrong stepping onto the Moon to a world-wide audience of 600 million people.

== Early years ==
Born in Glasgow, Scotland, Reid served in the Royal Navy from 1944 to 1947 and then obtained a first-class honours degree in electrical engineering from the University of Glasgow winning the Howe Prize in Electrical Engineering. Migrating to Australia in 1952, Reid served for five years as an electrical lieutenant in the Royal Australian Navy.

== Space tracking career ==
Appointed officer-in-charge of telemetry at the Woomera Rocket Range in 1958, Reid helped test British medium-range ballistic missiles. The following year, he was put in charge of Woomera’s RCA AN/FPS-16 Instrumentation Radar which tracked NASA's Project Mercury spacecraft. After leaving Woomera in 1962, Reid became a senior lecturer in electrical engineering at the South Australian Institute of Technology. In 1964, he was appointed inaugural director of NASA's Orroral Valley Tracking Station, south of Canberra. Because of management problems at the nearby Honeysuckle Creek Tracking Station, Reid was transferred there as director in 1967 to provide firm leadership. Honeysuckle’s role was to supply uplink and down link communications between Apollo astronauts and mission control. Just before 1 pm on 21 July 1969, AEST, Honeysuckle’s 85-foot dish was providing backup to a 210-foot dish in Goldstone, California, including a backup TV link with the Apollo Lunar Module, Eagle. Due to technical difficulties, Goldstone could not relay broadcast quality TV of Neil Armstrong as he descended the Eagle's ladder to the Moon’s surface. At the last minute, mission control switched over to Honeysuckle which transmitted to what was then the largest TV audience in history the footage of Armstrong stepping onto the Moon.

In 1970, Reid became director of the nearby Tidbinbilla Tracking Station, which maintained communications with spacecraft travelling to the outer edges of the Solar System and beyond. After overseeing communications with spacecraft from the Pioneer Program, Mariner Program and Voyager Program, Reid retired in 1988.

== Honours and awards ==
For his work as a space tracker, Reid was appointed as a Member of the Order of the British Empire (MBE) in 1970 and in 1989 he was presented with the NASA Exceptional Public Service Medal.

== Personal life ==
In 1952, Reid married Betty McKenna and they had four children. Following Betty's death in 1965, he married Margaret McLachlan. As Senator Reid, Margaret later went into politics, rising to become the first female president of the Australian Senate.

== Note ==
This article is based almost completely on a book written by former politician Andrew Tink and published in 2018. Tink became a personal friend of Tom Reid and his family while Tink was a law student at the Australian National University, Canberra, in the 1970s. The particulars of the book are as follows:

- Andrew Tink: HONEYSUCKLE CREEK: The story of Tom Reid, a little dish and Neil Armstrong's first step: NewSouth Publishing: ISBN 9781742236087 (paperback): ISBN 9781742244297 (ebook): ISBN 9781742248721 (ebooks)

== See also ==
- The Dish, 2000 film
