= Margaret Reid (politician) =

Australian politician (born 1935)

The Honourable Margaret Reid AO
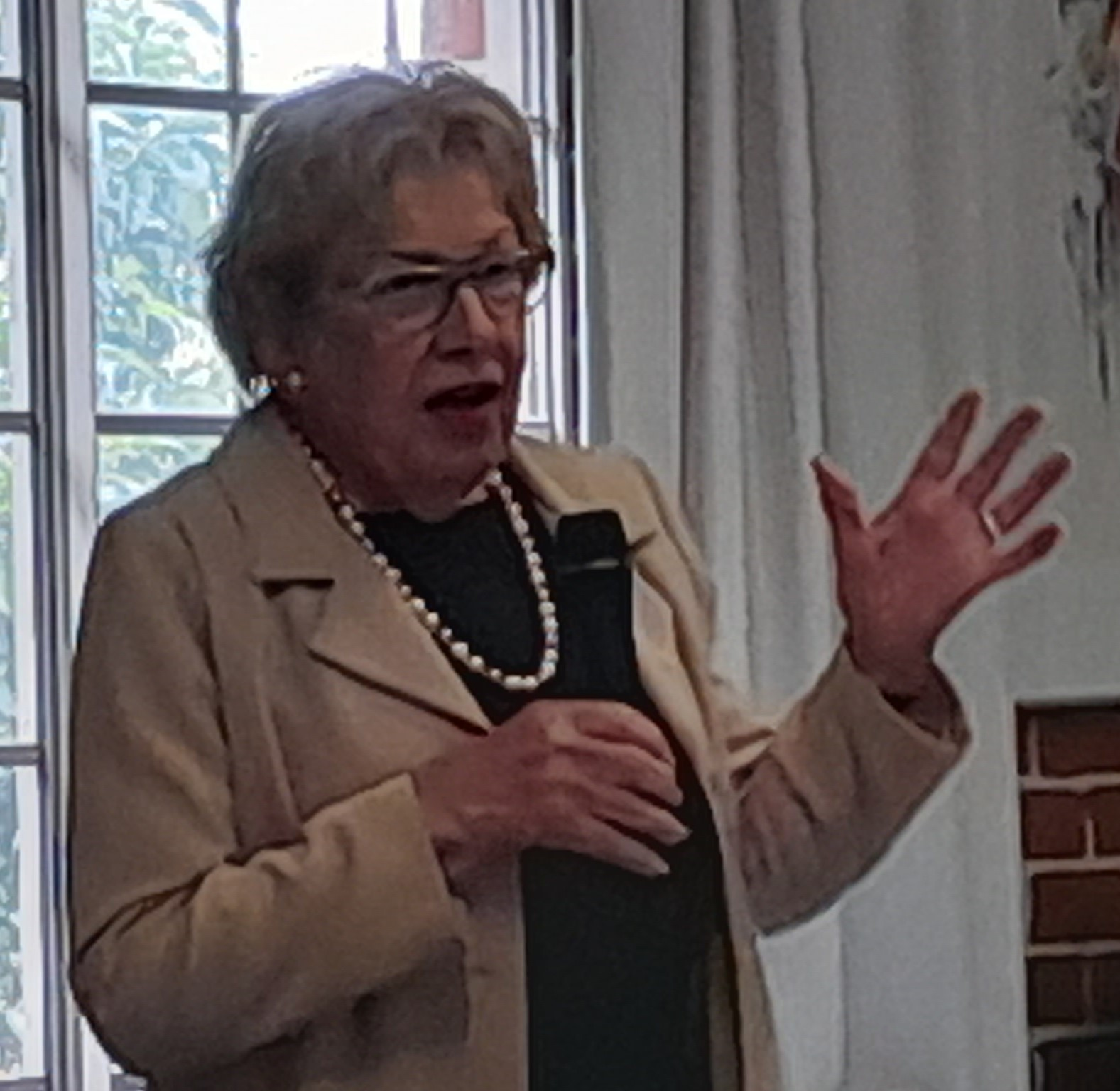
- Reid in 2021

President of the Australian Senate
- In office 20 August 1996 – 18 August 2002
- Preceded by: Michael Beahan
- Succeeded by: Paul Calvert

Senator for Australian Capital Territory
- In office 5 May 1981 – 14 February 2003
- Preceded by: John Knight
- Succeeded by: Gary Humphries

Personal details
- Born: Margaret Elizabeth McLachlan; 28 May 1935 (age 91) Crystal Brook, South Australia
- Party: Liberal
- Spouse: Tom Reid (m. 1967; died 2010)
- Education: University of Adelaide
- Profession: Barrister

Margaret Elizabeth Reid AO (née McLachlan; born 28 May 1935) is an Australian former politician who served as a Senator for the Australian Capital Territory from 1981 to 2003, representing the Liberal Party. She held her seat for nearly 22 years, winning eight consecutive elections. Reid is the first woman to have served as President of the Senate.

== Early years ==
Born Margaret Elizabeth McLachlan (Note: While some sources spell her birth name MacLachlan her parliamentary biography spells it McLachlan and her 1961 election results are listed under this spelling.) on 28 May 1935 in Crystal Brook, South Australia, Reid was educated at Balaklava Primary School, Methodist Ladies' College and the University of Adelaide, where she was president of the debating society. The speeches of Prime Minister Robert Menzies stirred her interest in politics. She joined the Liberal Party in 1954 and became president of the Adelaide University Liberal Club, the Australian Universities Liberal Federation, and the South Australia Young Liberals. She graduated from the University of Adelaide with a law degree in 1959.

== Legal career ==
Reid was admitted as a barrister and solicitor in the Supreme Court of South Australia in 1960 and worked in a family law practice in Adelaide.

In 1961, Reid ran as the Liberal candidate for the Division of Bonython, a Labor Party stronghold in South Australia. Her campaign improved upon the previous Liberal vote, though she later admitted she had "no possibility of winning".

In 1965, Reid moved to Canberra to join the law firm of Davies Bailey and Carter, initially in the fields of workers' compensation and third-party litigation before returning to family law. She worked at the firm until 1981.

== Political career ==
=== Party work and first term ===
Reid was active with the Australian Capital Territory (ACT) Liberal Party and held a number of senior positions, including election to party president in 1976. While continuing to practise law, Reid worked for Liberal Party Senator John Knight, the first senator for the ACT.

When Knight died in office in March 1981, Reid stepped forward as one of ten candidates hoping to fill the casual vacancy. The ACT Liberal Party endorsed Reid to replace Knight over other candidates including experienced politicians John Haslem and Greg Cornwell. (Note: John Haslem was a former Member of the House of Representatives for Canberra. Greg Cornwell was a Member of the Australian Capital Territory House of Assembly.) On 5 May 1981, Reid was appointed to the senate by a joint sitting of the Parliament of Australia. (Note: The rules for filling a casual vacancy were changed in 1974 so that a replacement senator was appointed by the relative territory's legislative assembly.)

During her first term, Reid served as chair of the Joint Committee on the ACT, successfully petitioned the prime minister to establish a Cabinet sub-committee on the ACT, and was elected Deputy Whip in the senate. Reid has stated that she took this role because it was only active while Parliament was in session, and did not seek a ministry or position on a major standing committee as such would limit the time she could work with her electorate, which in turn could affect her chances at re-election.

The Liberal–National Coalition government was defeated by Labor in the 1983 federal election. Reid failed to secure a quota (Note: Under Australia's instant-runoff voting system, the quota is the threshold of votes required to win on first preference. Failing to meet the quota means relying on the second, third or fourth preferences of voters.) and had to wait two weeks for the Electoral Office to confirm her victory.

=== Opposition Whip ===
For thirteen years while the Liberals were in opposition, Reid continued to hold her senate seat through three elections. She served as Opposition Deputy Whip and, from 1987 to 1995, Opposition Whip. She continued to serve on the Joint Standing Committee on the ACT, and also served on committees examining the Family Law Act and related issues; Senate estimates; transport, communications and infrastructure; legislation procedures; and the Australian Archives. Reid took part in major international government conferences including those of the Inter-Parliamentary Union (IPU) and Commonwealth Parliamentary Association (CPA) and on Parliamentary delegations.

Reid became Deputy President and Chair of Committees (Senate) in July 1995, after Noel Crichton-Browne was forced to resign from the position due to allegations of domestic violence. Crichton-Browne had been poised to take the Senate Presidency on a Liberal–National Coalition victory in the 1996 election; in his absence, Reid was seen as a replacement that party members could work with. On 20 August 1996 she became the first woman President of the Senate.

=== Senate President ===
Reid served as President of the Senate for a six-year term from 1996 to 2002. In the role, she often chaired committees, represented the parliament at international conferences and led parliamentary delegations abroad. She was president of the CPA and worked to promote democracy in developing nations. She worked on committees examining the broadcast of parliamentary sessions; parliamentary procedure; the parliamentary library; and appropriations and staffing. During her term as Senate President, Reid was re-elected twice, including her most-difficult contest in 1998, when the federal Liberal Party had lost popularity in the ACT. She received a final vote of 34.1 per cent over a quota of 33.4 per cent. The Democrats considered an appeal to the Court of Disputed Returns due to last-day campaign irregularities (Note: It took weeks before Democrat candidate Rick Farley conceded defeat.) but ultimately did not pursue this.

In 2002, Reid lost party support as the Senate President in a contest with Alan Ferguson and Liberal whip Paul Calvert, with Calvert ultimately chosen to succeed her. Reid retired from politics on 14 February 2003 after 22 years as a senator for the ACT.

== Personal life ==
Shortly after moving to Canberra, Reid met Tom Reid at a Christmas party. They married in 1967, and Reid adopted and helped raise his four children. By 2001, they had seven grandchildren. Tom Reid died in 2010.

== Honours and awards ==
- 1977 Queen Elizabeth II Silver Jubilee Medal (Australia)
- 1987 Order of Polonia Restituta (Poland) (Note: In her valedictory speech at the senate, Reid stated that she protested outside the Polish Embassy during the Cold War. She led a parliamentary delegation to Poland in 1996, where she delivered a speech on the country's transition to democracy.)
- 1996 Honorary Life Membership of the Returned and Services League of Australia
- 2000 Centenary Medal
- 2001 Victorian Honour Roll of Women
- 2004 Officer of the Order of Australia for her service to the Australian Parliament and the community.
- 2006 Honorary doctorate, Charles Sturt University
- Liberal Party Distinguished Service Award

== Footnotes ==
=== References ===
Political offices
Preceded by Michael Beahan	President of the Australian Senate; 1996–2002	Succeeded by Paul Calvert
Parliament of Australia
Preceded by John Knight	Senator for the Australian Capital Territory; 1981–2003; Served alongside: Susan Ryan, Bob McMullan, Kate Lundy	Succeeded by Gary Humphries
