= USAS American Mariner =

United States Army research vessel

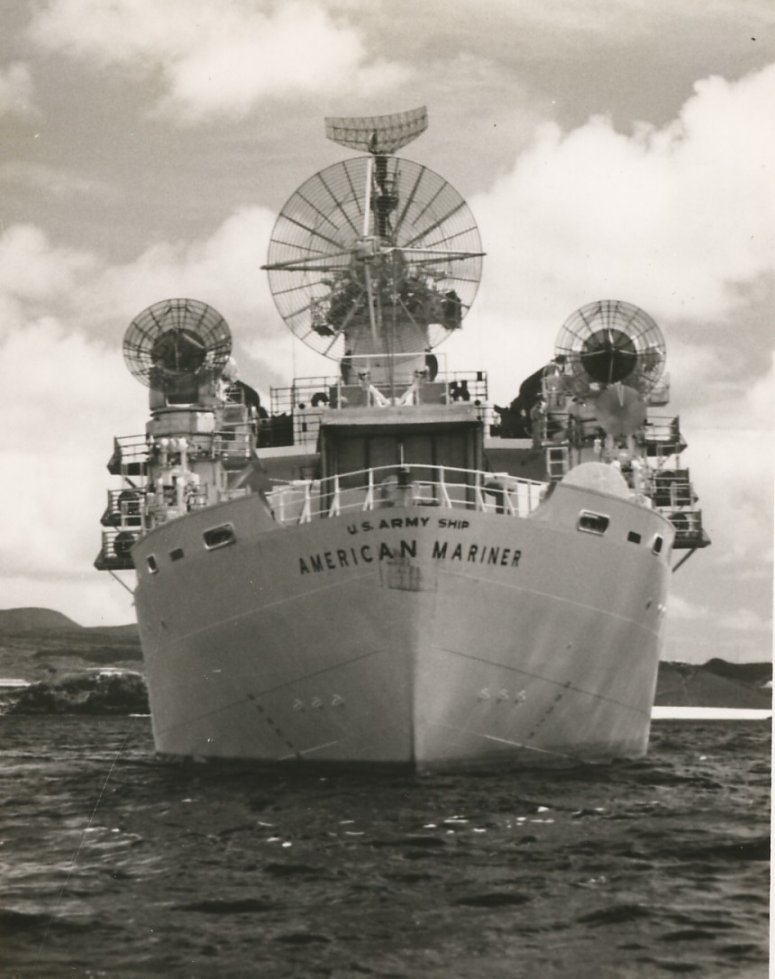
- USAS American Mariner

History

United States
- Name: George Calvert; American Mariner
- Namesake: George Calvert
- Owner: War Shipping Administration (WSA)
- Operator: United States Coast Guard (1941–1942); Maritime Commission (MARCOM) (1942–1945); Massachusetts Maritime Academy (AMA) (1946)
- Ordered: as type (EC2-S-C1) hull, MCE hull 20
- Awarded: 14 March 1941
- Builder: Bethlehem-Fairfield Shipyard, Baltimore, Maryland
- Cost: $4,021,748
- Yard number: 2007
- Way number: 7
- Laid down: 15 August 1941
- Launched: 30 December 1941
- Sponsored by: Miss Margaret E. Voss
- Completed: 12 February 1942
- Commissioned: 30 December 1941 (USCG)
- Decommissioned: 31 August 1942 (USCG)
- Renamed: American Mariner, 30 December 1941
- Reclassified: Z3-EC2-S-C1 Training Ship
- Identification: Call sign: KEST
- Fate: Transferred to US Army, 18 June 1958

United States
- Name: American Mariner
- Owner: US Army
- Acquired: 18 June 1958
- Refit: Brooklyn Navy Yard, 1961
- Identification: Call sign: NCVN
- Fate: Transferred to Military Sea Transportation Service, 7 January 1964

United States
- Name: American Mariner
- Owner: Military Sea Transportation Service
- Acquired: 1964
- In service: 7 January 1964
- Out of service: 7 January 1966
- Stricken: 7 January 1964
- Identification: Hull symbol: T-AGM-12; Call sign: NCVN
- Fate: Intentionally grounded for use as a target ship, October 1966

General characteristics
- Type: Z3-EC2-S-C1 Training Ship
- Displacement: 3,380 long tons (3,434 t) (light); 14,245 long tons (14,474 t) (max)
- Length: 441 feet 6 inches (135 m) oa; 416 feet (127 m) pp; 427 feet (130 m) lwl
- Beam: 57 feet (17 m)
- Draft: 24 ft 7 in (7.49 m)
- Installed power: 2 × Oil fired 450 °F (232 °C) boilers, operating at 220 psi (1,500 kPa); 2,500 hp (1,900 kW)
- Propulsion: 1 × triple-expansion steam engine, (manufactured by General Machinery Corp., Hamilton, Ohio); 1 × screw propeller
- Speed: 11.5 knots (21.3 km/h; 13.2 mph)
- Range: 23,000 mi (37,000 km)
- Endurance: 45 days
- Capacity: 9,507 barrels bunker C
- Complement: 12 officers, 55 crew, 50 RCA engineers
- Sensors & processing systems: C-band, L-Band/UHF-band radar; Infra-red systems, optics; 70 mm cameras, AGAVE

USAS American Mariner was a United States Army research vessel from January 1959 to 30 September 1963. She was originally assigned to the DAMP Project by the Advanced Research Projects Agency (ARPA) to attempt to collect radar signature data on incoming intercontinental ballistic missiles in the Caribbean, the South Atlantic Ocean, and the Indian Ocean. Her initial operations involved providing radar track on the Atlas missile, which was under development at the time. Subsequently, she provided track on other types of missiles as they proceeded through their development and operational stages. In September 1963 the original contract was transferred to the USAF until the completion of the testing phase in 1964.

Laid down in 1941 as the Liberty ship SS George Calvert (MC #20), she first saw service as the United States Coast Guard training ship TS American Mariner, as which she served until 1953, when she was placed in reserve. After her Army career, she was transferred to the United States Air Force on 1 October 1963, and was redesignated USAFS American Mariner. After Air Force service, she was transferred to the United States Navy on 7 January 1964 and designated USNS American Mariner (T-AGM-12). The mission was not essentially changed as a result of transfer of vessel management. On 1 January 1966 the vessel was stricken from the Navy list and returned for disposal. On 1 October 1966 title to the vessel was transferred to the Navy for disposal and later in the month she was scuttled in shallow water in the Chesapeake Bay about 5 nautical miles (9.3 km) northwest of Ewell, Smith Island, Maryland, for use for a target ship.

She appears to have been the only ship to have served in the U.S. Coast Guard, the U.S. Army, the U.S. Air Force, and the U.S. Navy after being built for service with the United States Merchant Marine.

== History ==
=== Initial construction and early history ===
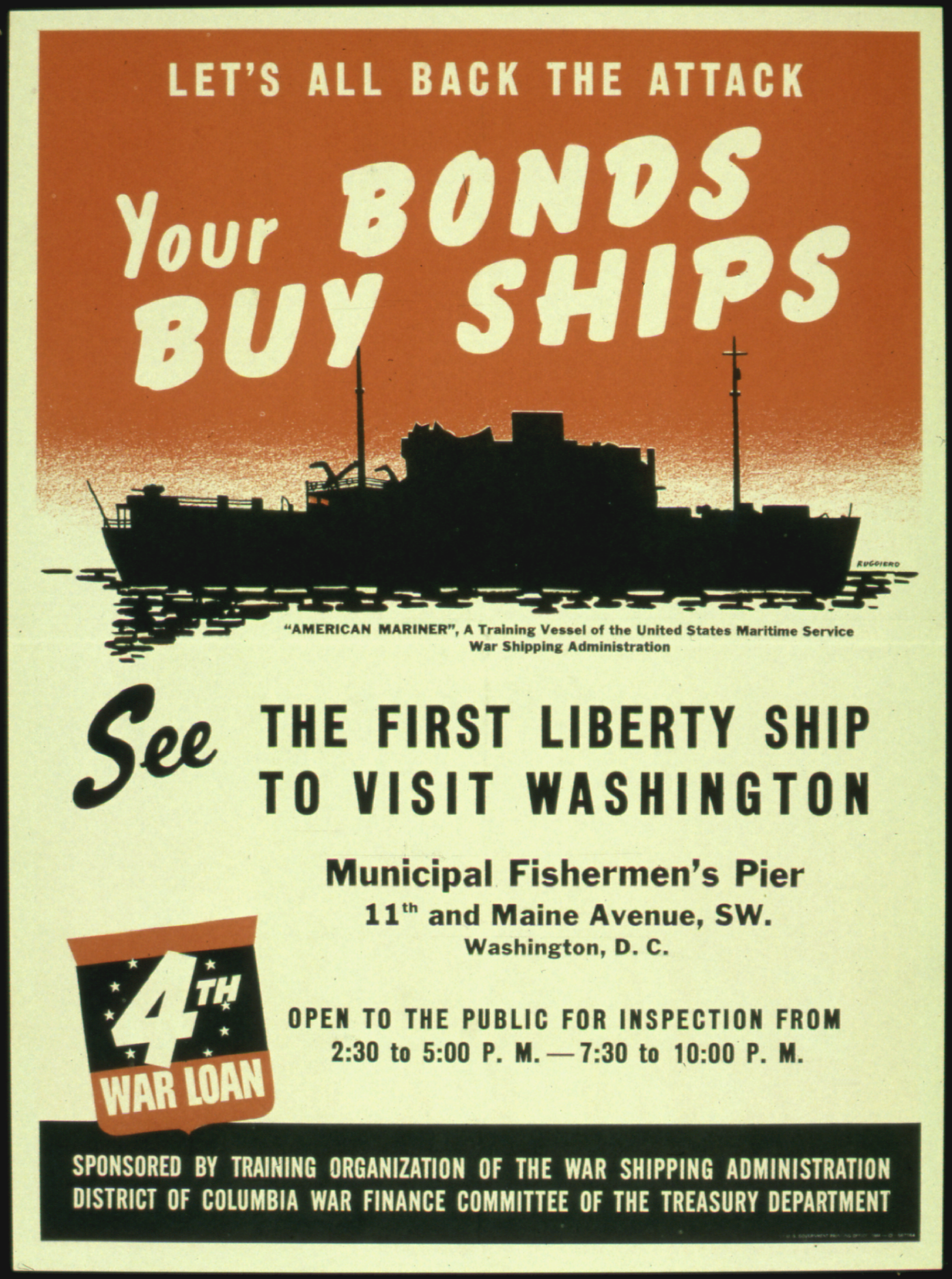
World War II poster with American Mariner

The keel for SS George Calvert (build number 2007/MC Hull 20) was laid on 15 August 1941 in the Bethlehem-Fairfield Shipyard, Baltimore, Maryland. She was launched 30 December 1941, sponsored by Miss Margaret E. Voss. At 65.4% complete, she was transferred for conversion to a training vessel. She had additional superstructure added to accommodate more personnel and was renamed TS American Mariner.

The conversion was completed 10 March 1943 and she was delivered to the War Shipping Administration – Division of Training. She then served the U.S. Coast Guard as a cadet training ship, together with SS American Seaman and SS American Sailor. After this service to the U.S. Coast Guard she was placed in a standby status on the Hudson River as she was no longer needed for the war effort. In 1950 she was transferred to the United States Merchant Marine Academy in Kings Point, New York for use as a training ship. She was returned to the Hudson River reserve fleet on 9 December 1953.

=== Conversion to missile tracking ship ===
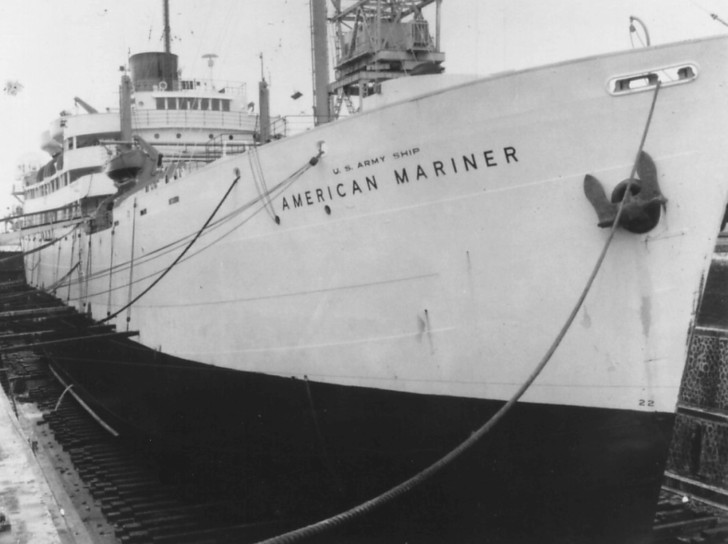
American Mariner at the start of her new career

On 18 June 1958 she was removed from the Hudson River, and transferred to the U.S. Army. and outfitted in early 1959 with state-of-the-art C-band-frequency narrow-beam radar tracking equipment for the Army.

The ship, re-designated USAS American Mariner, was then assigned to Mathiesen Tankers Industry, which provided the crew for the ship, and to RCA Service Company, which provided the necessary radar and computer equipment and technical personnel, and Barnes Engineering Company, which provided the necessary optical equipment and technical personnel for the ship's new DAMP Project assignment.

=== Atlantic missile test operations ===
During her years on the DAMP Project USAS American Mariner operated various types of long-distance, narrow-beam radars to gather data on intercontinental ballistic missiles. This period (1959–1963) represented the infancy of the "space race" and ballistic missiles in particular, and it was necessary, for security reasons, for the U.S. to determine if missiles could be identified in space (from a radar signature, for example) before they re-entered the atmosphere. Her home berth was Port Canaveral during this period.

It was hoped that various types of missiles would provide different radar signatures, something not known at the time. This would be important for distinguishing American missiles from those of other countries. This, if such data could be provided and fed into the computers of that era, would lead to the development of American anti-ballistic-missile defense systems, such as Nike-Zeus, which was a part of Project Nike.

During her Atlantic Ocean operations, USAS American Mariner gathered radar signature data of ballistic missiles launched by the Cape Canaveral Air Force Station into the Broad Ocean Area located off of the coast of Florida, as well as intercontinental ballistic missiles launched into the South Atlantic Ocean near Ascension Island. Collection of signature data of each missile type was important during the in-flight portion of the missile. This was especially true during the missile re-entry as the missile descended through the atmosphere to its designated target point in the ocean, which is where USAS American Mariner was usually positioned with its narrow-beam radars activated and searching in order to "lock on" to the missile.

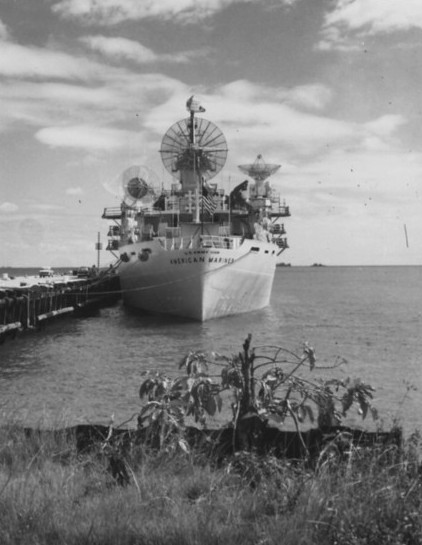
American Mariner at Trinidad

Tracking of missiles during re-entry was often difficult since, at times, the missile contained decoy pods which would be ejected during re-entry to deceive tracking personnel at the target test location. As a result, it was difficult to ensure that the vessel's radars were tracking the actual vehicle and not one of the decoys. The decoys were intended to deceive the "enemy" and not necessarily the test vessel's radars; however, those who designed the decoys needed to know how effective they actually were. All such data was very important at this critical time in early space and missile development during the early years of the "Cold War. The primary tracking radars were CBAND radars, which once locked onto their target were accurate within 6.1 metres (20 ft) at a distance of 2,000 kilometres (1,200 mi). These radars, however, could not search for targets on their own, requiring that they be designated to their target area by computers. There were two designation computers, one was a digital computer named RADAP, for Radar Designation, Acquisition, and Programmer(a militarized version of the commercial RCA 601), and an Analog computer, both used to point the radars to their target vicinity prior to actual lock-on"

=== Pacific missile test operations ===
In the Pacific Ocean in 1962, American Mariner gathered radar signature data of missiles launched during Operation Dominic and Operation Fishbowl atmospheric nuclear testing. The ship operated in the Johnston Island area and, during one major test, the nuclear event exploded in the upper atmosphere directly over the vessel in order to determine if the radars on the USAS American Mariner could track and identify missiles in the nuclear cloud. The cloud itself was "mapped" by the very large (30-foot, 9.1 m diameter) L-Band radar system employed. The photo to the right shows the L-Band radar dish straddled by the twin C-Band radar dishes.

While investigating reports of foreign missile testing in the North Pacific Ocean in November 1962, USAS American Mariner became caught up in Typhoon Karen, which caused significant rolling, and some flooding, of the top heavy ship, which was quickly repaired.

After completing test operations in the Pacific Ocean, USAS American Mariner navigated to the North Pacific where it investigated and tracked Russian missile tests, after which it returned to the Eastern Test Range in the Atlantic Ocean, by transiting the Panama Canal in January 1963.

=== Support of NASA ===
While in the Pacific Ocean, USAS American Mariner was temporarily assigned in late September 1962 to NASA in support of NASA's Project Mercury. During Wally Schirra's MA-8 transits over the Pacific Ocean, USAS American Mariner successfully provided radar track of the capsule. While assigned to this mission, all data provided by the ship's radars was processed by the RADAP computer which produced tape output which was then transmitted via teletype to mission control in accordance with NASA mission principles. The data provided a prediction of splashdown location, enabling the aircraft carrier Kearsarge to sail to that location, facilitating recovery of the capsule.

=== Vessel support ===
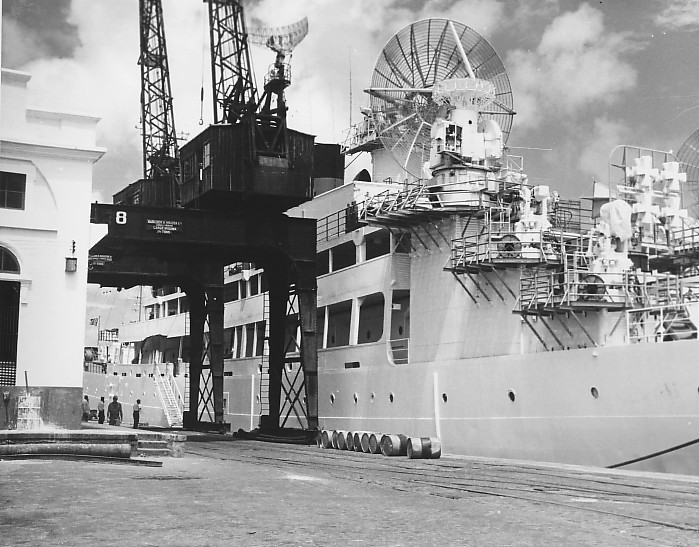
American Mariner being provisioned at Recife, Brazil.

While performing her missile-tracking operations, American Mariner was re-provisioned in various ports in both the Atlantic and Pacific Oceans:

In the Atlantic Ocean, shore-side support was generally provided at San Juan, Puerto Rico; Antigua Island; Chagaramus, Trinidad; Recife, Brazil; Monrovia, Liberia; Dakar, Senegal; and Cape Town, South Africa.

During Pacific Ocean operations, support, including logistics, mail, embarkation and transfer of technical personnel, occurred at Pearl Harbor, in Hawaii, at Midway Island, and at Johnston Island.

=== Vessel and equipment overhaul ===
Since American Mariner remained at sea for approximately four years under U.S. Army service, the ship regularly required shipyard service on her hull and her electronic equipment.

Extensive shipyard overhauls and drydocking were conducted in Brooklyn, New York; Baltimore, Maryland; San Juan, Puerto Rico; Long Beach, California; Pearl Harbor, Hawaii and Dakar in Senegal, Africa. Extensive technical enhancements in equipment [28-foot-diameter (8.5 m) L-band and UHF-band radar dish installation] were conducted in Cape Town, South Africa with the assistance of local technical personnel.

Prior to participating in nuclear testing operations during the Spring and Fall of 1962 under Operation Dominic, USAS American Mariner was outfitted at Pearl Harbor, Hawaii, with protective anti-radiation equipment, including emergency warning lights and a water spraying system that, when turned on during an atomic event, would cover the ship with a fine spray of water intended to remove and wash away nuclear contamination.

=== Retirement ===
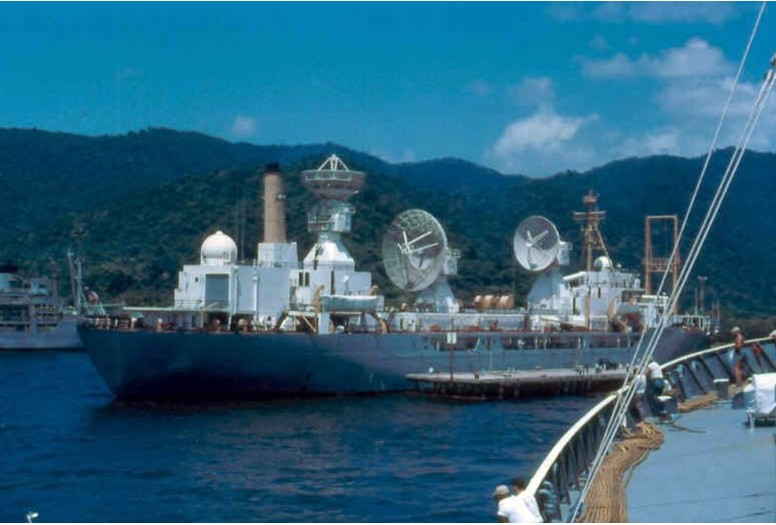
ARIS-type ships (center) replaced American Mariner

The operations of American Mariner, a radar-signature data gathering ship, was replaced, in mid-1964, by two U.S. Air Force ships, USNS General H. H. Arnold and USNS General Hoyt S. Vandenberg, both Advanced Research Instrumentation Ships (ARIS) which gathered and provided metric data to the Air Force. These ships were based in Cape Canaveral.

== Fate ==
In October 1966, she was scuttled in shallow water with demolition charges by Navy Underwater Demolition Team #22. Settling upright in 20 feet (6.1 m) of water, she appears to be merely anchored there. The hull is still used for target practice by naval aviators flying out of Naval Air Station Patuxent River, Maryland. Her hull is still visible in the Chesapeake Bay, at 38°02′25″N 76°09′17″W, roughly midway between Point Lookout and Smith Island.

== Bibliography ==
- "Bethlehem-Fairfield, Baltimore MD". ShipbuildingHistory.com. 14 August 2008.
- "SS George Calvert".
- "USNS American Mariner (T-AGM-12)". 1 March 2019.
- "MARAD Vessel History Database – AMERICAN MARINER (AGM-12)".
