= DAMP Project =

United States ARPA project to study missile reentry

The Downrange Anti-missile Measurement Program or DAMP was an applied research project to obtain scientific data, just prior to and during re-entry, on intermediate- and intercontinental-range ballistic missiles as they returned to earth. The program was funded by the Advanced Research Projects Agency (ARPA) under the technical direction of the Army Ordnance Missile Command (AOMC) during the period 1 January 1959 through 30 September 1963.

== Project organization ==
The downrange facility was a Liberty-class merchant vessel renovated and converted for its technical assignment and renamed the USAS American Mariner. Its measurement equipment complex included C-band, L-band and UHF radars; digital and analog recorders; gyroscope stabilization; timing generators; mode switching; telemetry acquisition apparatus; radiometers and riometers; boresight cine-TV and other photographic systems; communications and Transit Satellite navigation system.

As a complementary measurement facility to the DAMP ship, the Electromagnetic Research Laboratory at Moorestown, New Jersey, contained C- and L-band radar measurement equipment complete with digital and analog recording system in a range-support-tower combination for full-scale cross-section measurements under static conditions with orthogonal polarizations. Recorded analog data from this facility were provided for immediate use.

Data from both measurement facilities underwent necessary processing at the Riverton, New Jersey, data reduction center, a part of the Data Analysis Laboratory.

Foremost among DAMP Program objectives were to:

- Support AMM system designs.
- Support penetration aids program.
- Support AICBM weapon-system evaluation
- Provide scientific information on space environments and hypersonic flight
- Advance the general fund of knowledge on re-entry physics and dynamics and the plasma phenomena association with re-entry.
- Develop new data acquisition and processing techniques for expanded data quality.

== USAS American Mariner ==
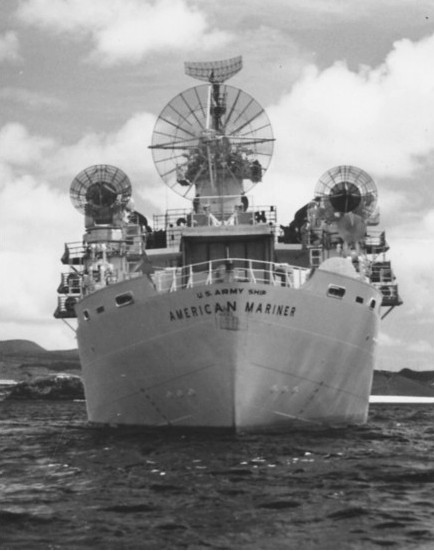
The DAMP Project ship, USAS American Mariner at anchor Clarence Bay, Ascension Island, 1962

The DAMP ship, USAS American Mariner, was essentially a floating measurements laboratory that employed various types of sensors, recording apparatus, and technical support equipment. It operated under conventional maritime regulations in the impact area of ballistic missile test firings, primarily in the Caribbean area and in the South Atlantic Ocean, near Ascension Island. During 1962, however, it operated in the Pacific Ocean in order to perform tracking duties during Operation Dominic atomic testing.

The shipboard crew, provided by Mathiasen Tankers Corp., was complemented by approximately sixty technical personnel provided by RCA and Barnes Engineering Corporation, who operated and maintained the radar and support equipment. Each mission required a minimum of 36 hours of on-station preparation and pre- and post-flight calibration. Targets were those of opportunity fired on missile ranges as part of the overall ballistic missile test program, which at the time was in its infancy.

The DAMP ship participated in numerous missile test operations on the Atlantic Missile Range, as well as on the Pacific Missile Range during 1962 in support of the Operation Dominic atomic tests with emphasis on radio frequency and radar electromagnetic effects. In addition, the DAMP ship served in support of the Ranger Program on the Atlantic Missile Range for the National Aeronautics and Space Administration (NASA). Activities included vehicle tracking during and subsequent to final burnout to supply designation data for the Deep Space Instrumentation Facility.

During its operation in the Atlantic Missile Range, the DAMP ship stopped at various ports for logistical support and requirements. Such ports included Recife, Brazil; Antigua, West Indies; Cape Town, and Monrovia and Senegal in Africa. While on the Pacific Missile Range, the DAMP ship was based out of Honolulu, Hawaii, and operated in the Johnston Island area.

== Electromagnetic Research Laboratory ==
The Electromagnetic Research Laboratory (ERL) was located near the Missile and Surface Radar Division plant of RCA in Moorestown, New Jersey. The C-band, low-power, cross-section-measurement system in conjunction with two static range configurations was used for full-scale targets weighing up to 4,000 pounds rotated through 360 degrees. Since measurements must be made on targets as if they were located in free space, returns from other than the target were reduced to 10^{−5} m^{2}, the general background level of one tower-terrain combination. The low-power radar was capable of transmitting any linear, circular, or elliptical polarization at C-band frequencies. It could receive the horizontal and vertical components of backscattered energy simultaneously. Cross-section data was recorded in analog form on Sanborn and Scientific Atlanta strip-chart recorders and on Ampex magnetic tape. Digital cross sections were also recorded on a specially designed CEC magnetic tape recorder.

Other important functions of the ERL were the training of technical personnel, development and checkout of new equipment and techniques, and satellite tracking using a modified FPQ-4 radar. L-band measurement capability, similar to the C-band equipment, was introduced in late 1963.

== Data Analysis Laboratory ==
The Data Analysis Laboratory (DAL) was, in general, devoted to preparation of DAMP data for dissemination to the many users. These data are submitted to many forms that require numerous reduction processes. Thus, the DAL was divided into three basic operational areas, namely: (1) the Data Reduction Center in Riverton, New Jersey, (2) the Data Interpretation Group in Moorestown, New Jersey, and (3) the Plasma Analysis Group in Moorestown, New Jersey.

Raw data from the DAMP ship's sensors was delivered to the data reduction center for reduction, smoothing, and conversion to forms appropriate to interpretation. Equipment used in this data processing cycle included a digital tape translator, an IBM 709 computer, an analog computer, various tape and card converters and card punches, analog and digital playback equipment, data plotters, chart and film readers, oscilloscope cameras and oscilloscopes, a photo darkroom, and miscellaneous support equipment.

The processed data would be disseminated directly or would be submitted to the Data Interpretation Group for study, interpretation, correlation, and comparison with theory. The data interpretation group was concerned with annotating basic data with interpretative comments to aid the ultimate data user. Objectives were to investigate every avenue for enhanced data output and maximum data accuracy and usefulness. Theoretical studies and experiments were made to augment the data comparisons and evaluations; such studies embraced the computational areas of numerical, mathematical, and statistical analysis, analog and digital simulation, and computer programming as well as the many physical sciences associated with missile flight and atmospheric re-entry.

One of the most important facets of re-entry physics is the interaction of plasmas and ionized wakes with electromagnetic waves. Work was being conducted in both the theoretical and practical nature of plasma physics as related to radar and associated phenomena; the following subcontract organization and consultants were active in support of phases of this research:

1. RCA Victor, Ltd. Research Laboratories, Montreal, Canada.
2. Keller and Lewis, New York University under the technical cognizance of Plasma and Space Applied Physics, RCA, Princeton, New Jersey.
3. General Applied Science Laboratories, Inc., Westbury, New York.

To evaluate the effects of plasma and wake on EM propagation, flow field studies were performed to generate plasma density contours. These theoretical results were used for comparison with measured data for analysis. Laboratory experiments and simulation studies were conducted to investigate complex phenomena such as turbulence in the plasma flow field.

== DAMP ship instrumentation ==
The DAMP ship was instrumented with various systems designed to locate and track incoming ballistic missiles in the predicted impact area, as well as instrumentation to record raw data.

=== Radar ===
One of the two AN/FPQ-4 radars aboard the DAMP ship permitted the tracking of beacon-carrying targets to an unambiguous range of 1,000 nautical miles (2,000 km). The L-band and UHF radars, which shared a common antenna, permitted observation of the target by illumination to supplement the C-band. The AN/FPS-12 radar permitted surveillance of the general vicinity of the DAMP ship as well as vectoring of aircraft which may be assigned to the ship.

The telemetry acquisition system was a passive acquisition aid operated on the interfereometer principle which gives angular position of the target relative to the ship. It was not a direct source of range information. Telemetry data was recorded on Magnetic tape at 7.5, 15, 30 and 60 ips from Nems Clark 1432 receiver.

The acquisition director, which comprised the RADAP-C Computer together with associated input and output devices, served as an acquisition aid, as means for checkout and calibration of associated electronic equipment, and, in the TRANSIT mode, as an aid to the navigation of the DAMP ship.

The Transit system of navigation consisted of the Transit satellite, a worldwide network of tracking stations to observe and determine the orbital elements of the satellite, and suitable receivers and Autonetics Recomp computers aboard the navigating vessel to receive the stable frequency radio signals broadcast by the satellite, to observe the Doppler frequency shift, and from this information, plus the approximate location of the vessel, compute to within one mile (1.6 km) the exact location of the vessel.

The quartz Reference Oscillator was the heart of the shipboard system, and operated at 1 MHz and 100 KC with a short term stability of 5 parts in 10 to the tenth averaged over a one-second interval, and a long term stability of 5 parts in 10 to the tenth per day.

=== Data recording ===
The Video Integrator accepted the radar video signal returns from a pulsed, range-gated radar system (AN/FPQ-4) and improved the signal-to-noise ratio of the radar video, thereby extending the acquisition range of the radar system. The video is continuously integrated and the output is in realtime.

In order to utilize fully the data gathering capabilities of the DAMP ship, it was necessary that the data gathered be stored in a form which permitted easy retrieval at the data analysis facility. Therefore, all data obtained at the DAMP ship was stored only on certified and designated CEC digital recorders, Ampex recorders, a Sanborn recorder, an RCA video recorder and a Mincom recorder. Timing was provided by two Hermes Hycon Eastern timing generators, one primary and one back-up. Timing signal outputs were 24-bit pulse absence code, 17-bit pulse absence code, and 13-bit pulse width code. Both generators were synchronized with Bureau of Standards, WWV, time standard.

Raw test data recorded included time, sync and control, tracker 1 and 2 radar data, L-band and UHF radar data, gyro and server data, telemetry, voice, video and any other data designated by the test director.

One of the two Mk 51 Mod 3 gun directors, suitably modified and fitted with M-7 elbow telescopes (8-power, 6" field) was employed to furnish designation information to the AN/FPQ-4 tracking radars in "optical" mode. These directors had an azimuth travel of plus/minus 370 degrees and elevated from -20 degrees to +90 degrees. Azimuth and elevation data output was furnished at 1- and 36-speed from two (size 23) 400-cycle synchros. Maximum position error was 0.5 mil.

=== Communications equipment ===
Communications aboard the DAMP ship served several purposes: to communicate with administrative offices in New Jersey, to receive, immediately after launch, predicted impact data from the launch agency firing the ballistic or intercontinental missile, and, after completion of impact tracking, to report "quicklook" data back to the ERL in New Jersey so that it could be evaluated and a summary report be forwarded on to the project sponsor, ARPA.

During this period of operation, communications via satellite did not yet exist. As a result, communications between the DAMP ship and New Jersey was through the use of single-sideband (SSB) radio, generally through the use of a 10 kW transmitter. The DAMP ship generally transmitted upper sideband (USB) voice and/or lower sideband (LSB) frequency-shift keying radioteletype in the area of 16 and 22 MHz when atmospheric conditions were favorable. When communications became difficult because of atmospheric conditions, the DAMP ship shifted to carrier wave (CW) transmission using standard Morse Code. In addition, because the ship could be out to sea for extended periods, such as a month or so, the DAMP ship carried an amateur radio room and equipment, which technical personnel could use to communicate with their families back home in the States via short wave radio.

For local area communicating – for example, when in the Ascension Island area in the Atlantic or the Johnston Island area in the Pacific – the DAMP vessel had the capability of transmitting and receiving USB voice and LSB radioteletype to/from such island locations. The DAMP ship could also communicate with aircraft and nearby islands using various VHF or UHF radio configurations.

Various antenna were employed to obtain maximum range from ship-to-shore. The UHF transceiver used a discone, while the VHF transceivers used ground plane antennas. The 1 kW HF transmitter used a remotely tuned 35-foot (11 m) whip antenna, while the 3 kW HF transmitter used a vertical cage antenna., and the 10 kW transmitter employed a discone antenna. The vessel contained numerous state-of-the-art receivers, which were fed from an antenna distribution system from three 18-foot (5 m) whips.

The DAMP ship also carried advanced cryptographic equipment which could be used to encode or decode messages of a confidential or secret nature. Details of such equipment is classified and not described here.

As required by law, the ship's Merchant Marine Master had a radio room and a radio operator who was responsible for ship's business but was not associated in any way with the operation of the radio system used for technical purposes.

== Tracking pedestals ==
Four modified TALOS AN/FPW-2 Guidance Pedestals were slaved to either or both of the AN/FPQ-4 tracking radars in order to provide optical, infra-red and other supplementary instrumentation for the observation of re-entry bodies.

== Mission completion ==
On September 30, 1963, the U.S. Army Advanced Research Projects Agency DAMP mission and contract expired, and the U.S. Air Force assumed operational control of American Mariner. On January 1, 1964, it became an integral, but temporary, part of the U.S. Air Force's Eastern Test Range in the Atlantic Ocean, and was placed under the control of the Missile Test Project (MTP) based out of Patrick Air Force Base, Florida. (See Eastern Test Range for details.) Eventually, the ship was removed from missile tracking service and sunk in the Chesapeake Bay while being used as a target by U.S. Navy pilots from the Patuxent River Naval Air Station.

== Bibliography ==
- Hahn, Herbert Paul (1990). American Mariner a documentary biography of her role as: Liberty Ship, Training Ship, Missile Instrumentation Ship, Mystery Ship, Test Target. Kings Point, New York: American Merchant Marine Museum Foundation. ISBN 1-879180-00-6.

== See also ==
- Radar
- Missile
- Cold War
- Army Ballistic Missile Agency
- Missile and Space Intelligence Center
- Eastern Test Range
- Missile Test Project

=== Lists ===
- List of radars
- List of ships of the United States Air Force
- List of military electronics of the United States
