= Andrew Tink =

New South Wales politician

Andrew Tink AM
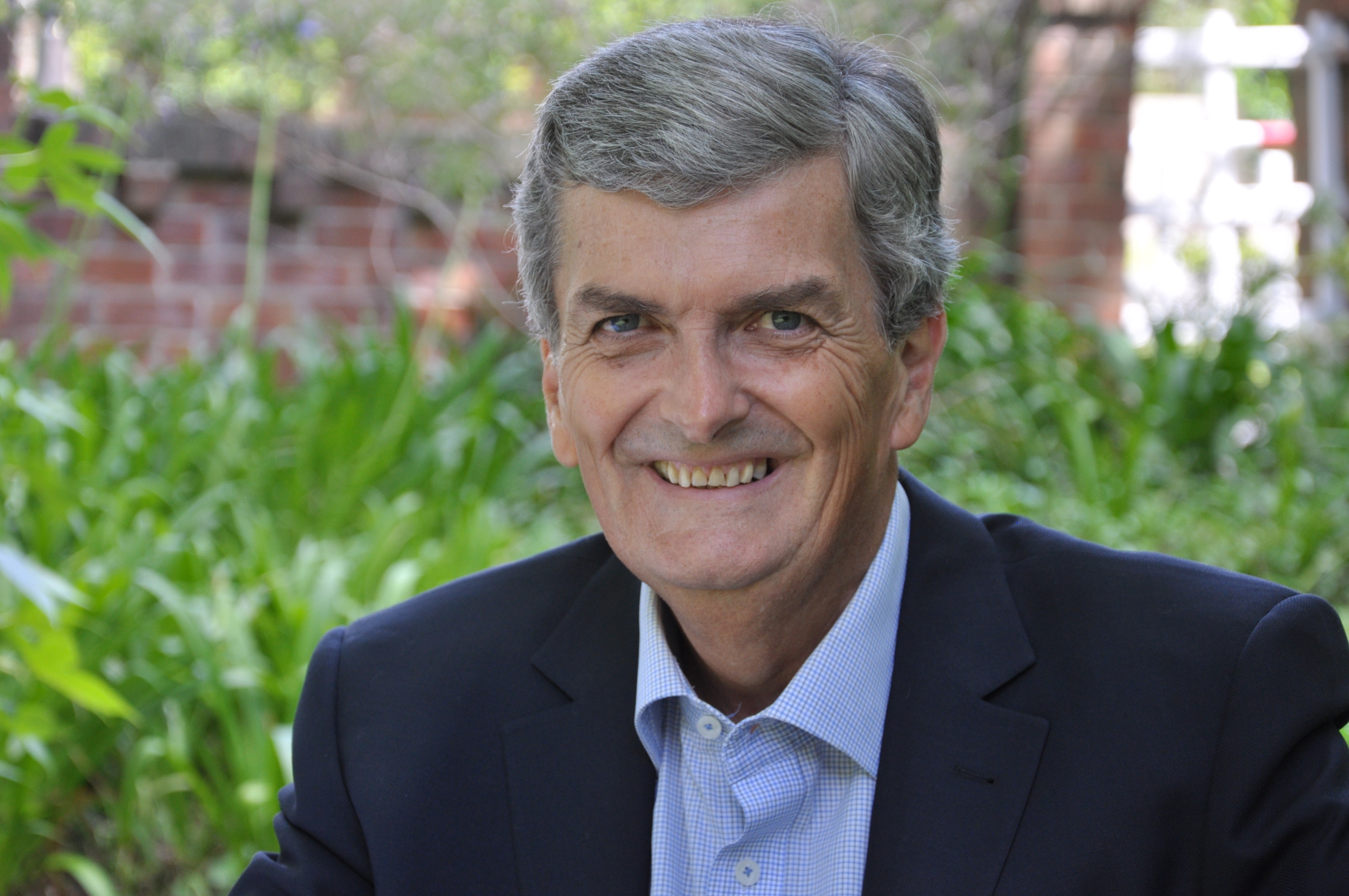

Member of the New South Wales Legislative Assembly for Epping
- In office 19 March 1999 – 2 March 2007
- Preceded by: New seat
- Succeeded by: Greg Smith

Member of the New South Wales Legislative Assembly for Eastwood
- In office 19 March 1988 – 19 March 1999
- Preceded by: Jim Clough
- Succeeded by: Seat abolished

Personal details
- Born: 13 July 1953 (age 73) Sydney, New South Wales, Australia
- Party: Liberal Party
- Spouse: Kerry
- Children: 2 sons
- Occupation: Writer
- Profession: Barrister
- Website: http://www.andrewtink.com

Andrew Arnold Tink AM (born 13 July 1953) is a former Australian politician, having served as a member of the New South Wales Legislative Assembly for the Liberal Party from 1988 to 2007. He was in the shadow cabinet from 1995 until March 2006. He has written two political biographies, a third book on the events and political consequences of a fatal plane crash, a fourth on Australian history, culture and society in the 20th century and a fifth on the involvement of Honeysuckle Creek Tracking Station in the first Moon landing. Since leaving politics, Tink has been appointed a visiting fellow and adjunct professor at Macquarie University, as a trustee of the Historic Houses Trust of New South Wales (Sydney Living Museums) and president of the Library Council of New South Wales. He is an honorary Doctor of Letters honoris causa from Macquarie University.

== Early life and family ==
Tink was educated at Sydney Grammar School. He competed in sailing, for Australia against New Zealand, in the 1967 Interdominion Cherub Championships. During 1970–1971, Tink was an exchange student at Los Altos High School, in Silicon Valley, California. There he was elected vice-president of the student body, later becoming president. Tink graduated as a Bachelor of Arts (1975) and Bachelor of Laws (1977) from the Australian National University where he was senior tutor at John XXIII College in 1976. Before being elected to the New South Wales Parliament, he practised as a barrister. He is married with two sons.

== Political career ==
Tink represented the seat of Eastwood from 1988 to 1999, and then the seat of Epping from 1999 to 2007, for the Liberal Party. In 1983 he had been one of the members of a "new guard" in the NSW Liberal Party pressing for change after the party had suffered a number of humiliating defeats at the hands of NSW Labor Premier Neville Wran. After defeating long serving incumbent Liberal Member Jim Clough in party preselection, Tink entered the New South Wales Legislative Assembly.

In 1992, Tink led an enquiry into the police complaints system. As a result, minor complaints came to be dealt with internally by the police, while the Ombudsman was given greater powers to investigate serious matters.

While Tink was Chairman of the Parliamentary Public Accounts Committee, the Committee published over twenty major reports achieving cross party agreement on a number of extremely contentious issues. They included ground breaking reports on public-private partnerships in the provision of infrastructure, as well as proposals for greater public transparency in infrastructure contracts relating to the Sydney 2000 Olympics.

The Committee also released a report unanimously recommending numerous reforms to curtail the burgeoning $300 million a year cost of the government subsidised free School Student Transport Scheme. The Committee proposed including swipe cards to monitor accurately the number of students using the Scheme. It also proposed including an annual $40 co-contribution to the fares from parents. Despite support in principle from subsequent NSW governments, as at 2012 these measures have not been put in place

Liberal Premier John Fahey appointed Tink as Parliamentary Secretary to the Premier in 1994. After the Liberals lost office in 1995, the new Liberal Opposition Leader Peter Collins immediately appointed Tink to the Shadow Cabinet as spokesperson for Family and Community Services

Later as shadow Minister for Police and then as shadow Attorney General, Tink sponsored over 30 private member's bills. Among them was one to give magistrates power to confiscate the passports of people charged with serious crimes, a measure supported by the government. Another, providing for 11-1 majority jury verdicts in criminal trials, was opposed by the government for a decade, before finally becoming law in 2006. A third, to establish a parliamentary oversight committee for the director of public prosecutions was blocked by the legal profession, despite a similar committee having successfully operating in the House of Commons in Great Britain for some years.

In his valedictory speech to Parliament on 22 November 2006, Tink proposed that juries should play a role in sentencing. If a jury returned a guilty verdict for a crime carrying a standard non-parole period set by Parliament, the jury would be asked whether, on the evidence it had heard during the trial, the standard non-parole period should apply. If the answer was 'yes', the judge would use the non-parole period as the minimum starting point for sentencing and if 'no' then there would be no such restriction.

Shadow Leader of the House for four years, Tink became known for his aggressive yet humorous question time performances and his flair for theatrical debate. Premier Morris Iemma nicknamed him 'the chainsaw'. After John Brogden stepped down as Opposition Leader in August 2005, Tink declined repeated requests that he stand for the leadership including being the choice of Liberal Prime Minister John Howard. He resigned as shadow Attorney General on 20 March 2006, citing health and personal reasons, and did not contest the 2007 State election. He was succeeded by Liberal candidate Greg Smith SC who reclaimed the seat in the 2007 state election.

== Political biographer and writer ==
In 2009, Tink completed the first comprehensive biography of William Charles Wentworth (1790–1872), Australian explorer, barrister, newspaper publisher, politician and landowner, published by Allen & Unwin. In November 2010, for the work entitled William Charles Wentworth: Australia's Greatest Native Son, Tink won the Nib CAL Waverley Library Award for Literature.

In 2011, Tink's second book and the first comprehensive biography on the subject, Lord Sydney: The Life and Times of Tommy Townshend, was published by Australian Scholarly Publishing. Lord Sydney (1733–1800) was a British cabinet minister and statesman. Sydney in Nova Scotia, Canada, and Sydney in New South Wales, Australia were named in his honour, in 1785 and 1788 respectively.

Tink's third book was published in April 2013, Air Disaster Canberra: The Plane Crash That Destroyed a Government. It covers the events and consequences, both personal and political, of the Canberra air crash of 13 August 1940. The crash killed three senior cabinet ministers in the first Menzies government, Brigadier Geoffrey Austin Street, James Valentine Fairbairn and Sir Henry Somer Gullett as well as Fairbairn's Private Secretary. General Sir Cyril Brudenell Bingham White, Lieutenant Colonel Francis Thornthwaite and four other service personnel were also killed.

Australia 1901–2001: A Narrative History, Tink's fourth book was published in November 2014 by NewSouth Publishing. It tells the story of Australia in the 20th century, from Federation to the Sydney 2000 Olympics. It was a century marked by the trauma of war and the despair of the Depression, but balanced by extraordinary achievements in sport, science and the arts.

In November 2018, NewSouth Publishing released Tink's fifth book, Honeysuckle Creek: The Story of Tom Reid, a Little Dish and Neil Armstrong's First Step. The book is about Tom Reid, who was the director of Honeysuckle Creek Tracking Station, just south of Canberra, when it tracked the first moon landing.

== Subsequent appointments ==
In 2006, Tink was appointed a visiting fellow at Macquarie University's law school and in 2012, a member of the Library Council of New South Wales from 11 January 2012 to 31 December 2014 (inclusive): [new appointment].

Later in 2012, Tink was appointed as trustee of the Historic Houses Trust of New South Wales for a period of three years commencing from 20 July 2012. Vaucluse House, once the home of Wentworth, the subject of Tink's first biography, is one of the properties managed by the Trust.

In February 2013, Tink was recognised for his significant contributions to the cultural and political life of New South Wales with a Doctor of Letters honoris causa from Macquarie University.

On 1 July 2013, Tink was appointed as an adjunct professor at the Macquarie University Law School and Centre for Legal Governance in Sydney until 31 May 2018. This appointment has been extended to 31 May 2023.

In 2014 Tink was appointed a Member of the Order of Australia (AM) 'for significant service to the Parliament of New South Wales, to local history, and to the law'.

In May 2014 NSW Premier Mike Baird included Tink as part of a three-person expert panel to review NSW election funding laws following controversial revelations about political donations by an ICAC inquiry. The panel, chaired by Kerry Schott, Chair of Sydney Water included former Labor Deputy Premier John Watkins

On 1 January 2015 Tink commenced a three-year appointment as president of the Library Council of New South Wales, but due to ill heath, he stepped down on 23 March 2016.

By letters patent dated 20 May 2015, the New South Wales Government commissioned Tink to examine ways in which oversight of the NSW Police Force and NSW Crime Commission could be streamlined and strengthened. On 26 November 2015, Troy Grant, Deputy Premier of New South Wales and Minister for Justice and Police, announced that the Government accepted Tink's report dated 31 August 2015 entitled Review of Police Oversight. The report recommended a single civilian body to oversee the NSW Police Force and NSW Crime Commission to be called the Law Enforcement Conduct Commission. The new body would replace the Police Integrity Commission, the Police Division of the Office of the Ombudsman and the Inspector of the NSW Crime Commission. Later in the year, Troy Grant released Tink's report and announced the Government accepted his recommendations for a single civilian oversight body. In 2017 the Law Enforcement Conduct Commission was established.

== Notes ==
New South Wales Legislative Assembly
Preceded by Jim Clough	Member for Eastwood; 1988–1999	District abolished
District created	Member for Epping; 1999–2007	Succeeded by Greg Smith
