= Peak power =

Highest transmissible power level

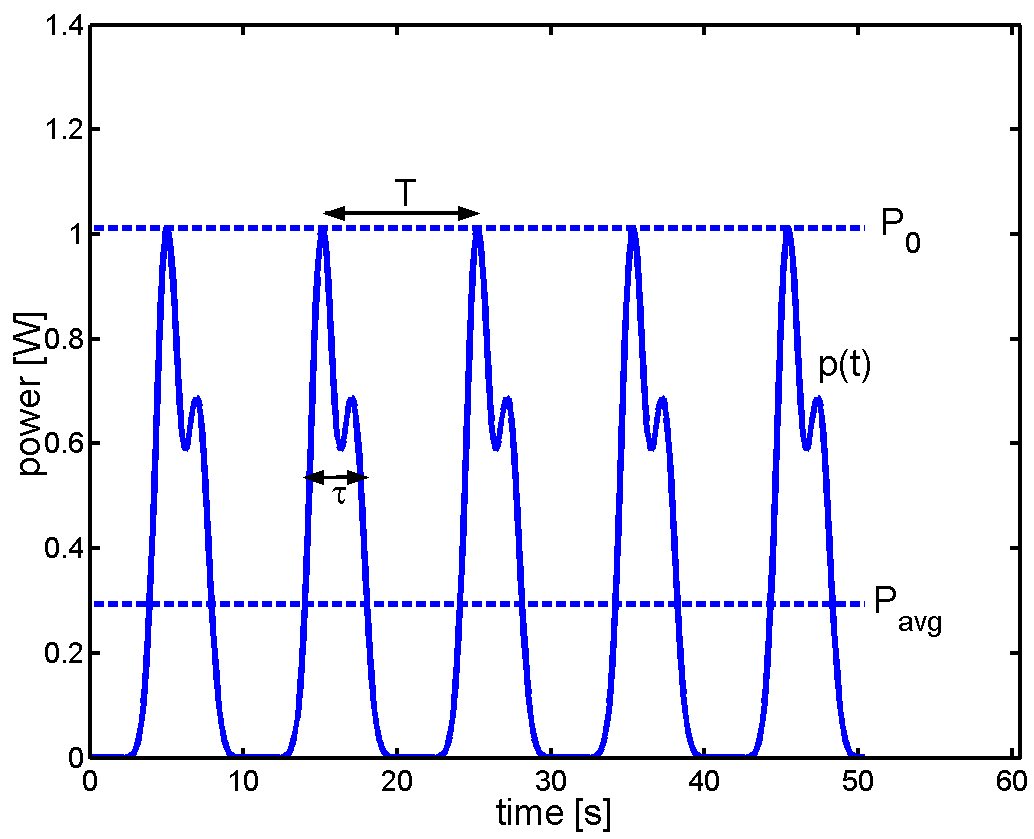
A periodic function. Its peak power is illustrated by the horizontal line P_{0}.

Peak power refers to the maximum of the instantaneous power waveform, which, for a sine wave, is always twice the average power. For other waveforms, the relationship between peak power and average power is the peak-to-average power ratio (PAPR). It always produces a higher value than the average power figure, however, and so has been tempting to use in advertising without context, making it look as though the amp has twice the power of competitors .

Peak power is a fundamental concept in electrical engineering, relevant to various types of waveforms, including alternating current (AC) and other signal forms. It represents the maximum instantaneous power level that a system can handle or produce. This article explores the significance of peak power across different applications and waveforms.

The peak power of an amplifier is determined by the voltage rails and the maximum amount of current its electronic components can handle for an instant without damage. This characterizes the ability of equipment to handle quickly changing power levels, as many audio signals have a highly dynamic nature.

== Radio frequency ==
Peak power is the highest power level that a transmitter can achieve during its operation. Unlike average power, which is the mean power output over a period, peak power represents the maximum power output at any given instant. This distinction is crucial in applications where signal peaks can significantly exceed the average power level. Peak power is a critical parameter in the field of radio frequency (RF) and telecommunications. It refers to the maximum instantaneous power level that a transmitter can output. Understanding peak power is essential for designing and operating efficient and effective communication systems.

== Importance ==
Peak power is a fundamental concept in the design and operation of transmitters. It plays a crucial role in ensuring signal integrity, system performance, and component reliability. By understanding and managing peak power, engineers can design more efficient and effective communication systems.

1. Signal Integrity: High peak power ensures that the transmitted signal can overcome noise and interference, maintaining signal integrity over long distances.
2. System Performance: In systems like radar and communication transmitters, peak power is vital for achieving the desired range and clarity.
3. Component Stress: Understanding peak power helps in designing components that can withstand these power levels without damage.

== Measurement of Peak Power ==
Measuring peak power involves capturing the highest power level within a specified time frame. This can be done using specialized equipment like peak power meters, which can accurately track and record these peaks. The measurement process must account for various factors, including signal type and modulation.

== Applications of Peak Power ==
1. Radar Systems: In radar systems, peak power determines the maximum range and resolution. Higher peak power allows for better detection and imaging of distant objects.
2. Communication Systems: In communication systems, peak power ensures that signals can be transmitted over long distances without significant loss of quality.
3. Broadcasting: In broadcasting, peak power is crucial for maintaining signal strength and quality, especially in areas with high interference.

== Challenges and Considerations ==
1. Heat Dissipation: High peak power levels can generate significant heat, requiring efficient cooling systems to prevent damage.
2. Intermodulation Distortion: Non-linearities in the transmitter can cause intermodulation distortion, affecting signal quality. Proper design and calibration are necessary to minimize these effects.
3. Regulatory Compliance: Transmitters must comply with regulatory limits on peak power to avoid interference with other communication systems.
