= Patrick Space Force Base =

U.S. Space Force base near Cocoa Beach, Florida

- Near Cocoa Beach, Florida in the United States
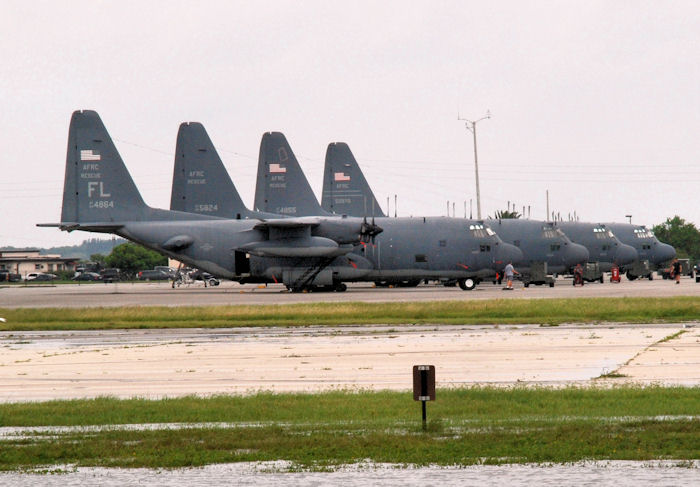
- HC-130 Hercules of the 920th Rescue Wing based at Patrick SFB

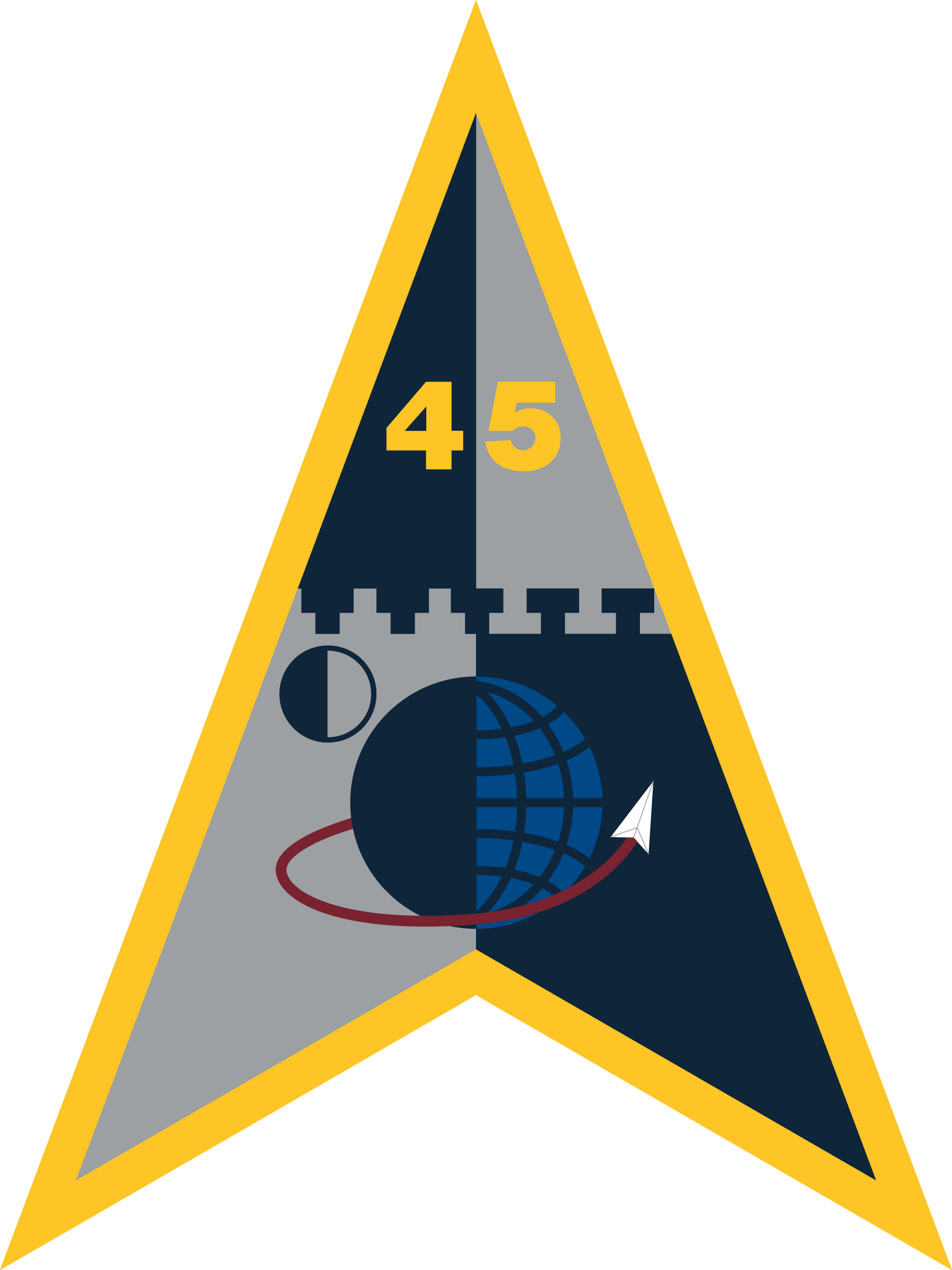
- Emblem of Space Launch Delta 45

Site information
- Type: US Space Force Base
- Owner: Department of Defense
- Operator: United States Space Force
- Controlled by: Space Launch Delta 45
- Condition: Operational
- Website: www.patrick.spaceforce.mil

Location
- Location within Florida Location within the United States Location within North Atlantic
- Coordinates: 28°14′06″N 80°36′36″W

Site history
- Built: 1940 (as Naval Air Station Banana River)
- In use: 1940 – 1947; 1948 – present

Garrison information
- Current commander: Maj Gen Stephen G. Purdy, Jr.
- Garrison: Space Launch Delta 45 (host wing)

Airfield information
- Identifiers: IATA: COF, ICAO: KCOF, FAA LID: COF, WMO: 747950
- Elevation: 2.4 metres (7 ft 10 in) AMSL
Runways
Direction	Length and surface
03/21	2,744.1 metres (9,003 ft) Asphalt/Concrete
11/29	1,219.2 metres (4,000 ft) Asphalt
- Source: Federal Aviation Administration

Patrick Space Force Base (IATA: COF, ICAO: KCOF, FAA LID: COF) is a United States Space Force installation located between Satellite Beach and Cocoa Beach, in Brevard County, Florida, United States. It is named in honor of Major General Mason Patrick, USAAC. It is home to Space Launch Delta 45 (SLD 45), known as the 45th Space Wing (45 SW) when it was part of the Air Force. In addition to its "host wing" responsibilities at Patrick SFB, the 45 SW controls and operates Cape Canaveral Space Force Station (CCSFS) and the Eastern Range.

The base was originally opened and operated from 1940 to 1947 as Naval Air Station Banana River, a United States Navy airfield. It was then deactivated as a naval installation in 1947 and placed in caretaker status until it was transferred to the United States Air Force in late 1948. After briefly taking on the name Joint Long Range Proving Ground, the base was known as the Patrick Air Force Base beginning in 1950. The base took on its current name in 2020 upon its transfer to the recently established U.S. Space Force.

Additional tenant activities at Patrick SFB include the 920th Rescue Wing, the Air Force Technical Applications Center, and the Defense Equal Opportunity Management Institute (DEOMI). Total employment is 10,400. There are 13,099 military, dependents, civilian employees, and contractors on base.

The base is a census-designated place (CDP) and had a resident population of 1,642 as of the 2020 census, up from 1,222 at the 2010 census. It is part of the Palm Bay—Melbourne—Titusville, Florida Metropolitan Statistical Area.

The base also administers the Malabar Annex in Palm Bay.

== History ==
=== Naval use in World War II ===
Authorized by the Naval Expansion Act of 1938, Naval Air Station Banana River was commissioned on 1 October 1940 as a subordinate base of the Naval Air Operational Training Command at Naval Air Station Jacksonville, Florida. The Navy bought 1,900 acres (770 ha) of scrub land south of Cocoa Beach.

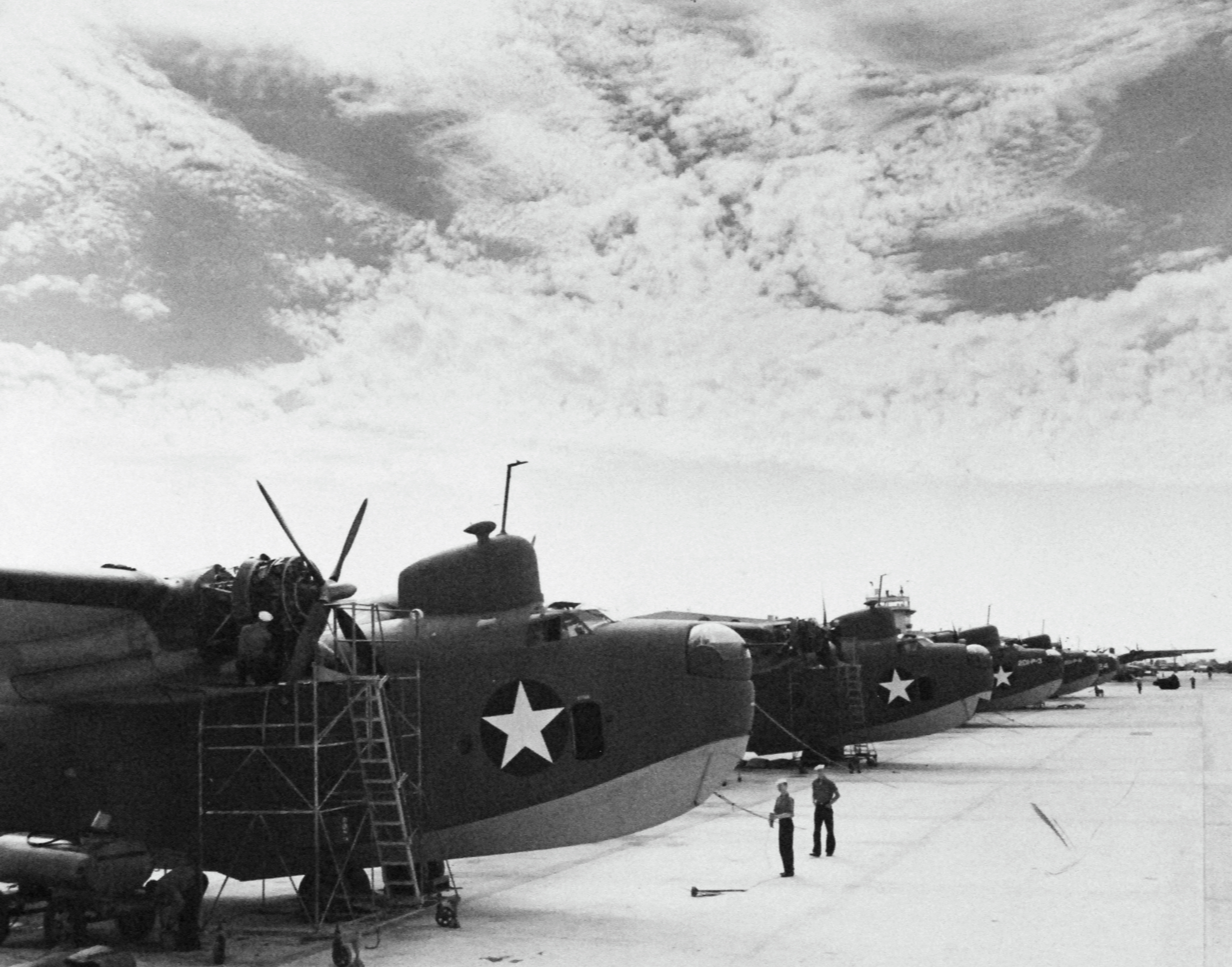
PBM-3Cs of Patrol Squadron 201 (VP-201) at NAS Banana River, late 1942

With the advent of war with Japan and Germany in December 1941, the Navy began anti-submarine patrols along the Florida coast using PBY Catalina and PBM Mariner seaplanes based at this facility. PBMs returned to training duty in March 1942 when replaced on patrol by OS2U Kingfisher seaplanes. Landing strips were constructed in 1943, allowing shore-based aircraft to operate concurrently. The Free French Naval Air Service officers also trained in PBMs at NAS Banana River. Various military-related activities took place at NAS Banana River, including maritime patrol aviation operations against German U-boats, air search and rescue operations, patrol bomber bombardier training, seaplane pilot training, and communications research. Other activities included a blimp squadron detachment, an Aviation Navigation Training School, and an experimental training unit termed Project Baker, a confidential program that developed and tested instrument landing equipment. NAS Banana River hosted a significant aircraft repair and maintenance facility. Later in the war, a small detachment of German POWs from Camp Blanding worked at NAS Banana River on cleanup details. At its peak, the base complement included 278 aircraft, 587 civilian employees, and over 2,800 officers and enlisted personnel.

==== Units ====
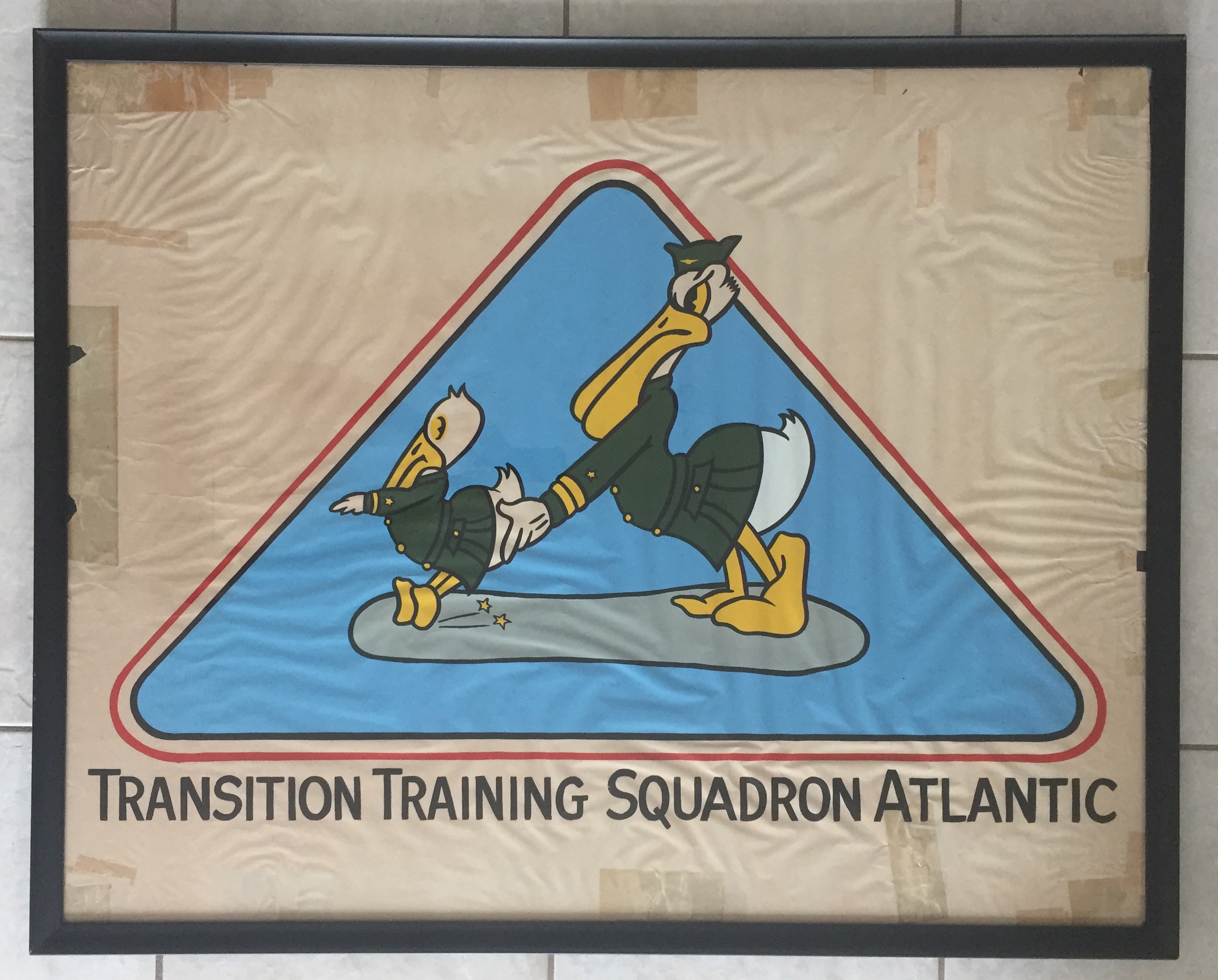
Transition Training Squadron emblem while at Naval Air Station Banana River

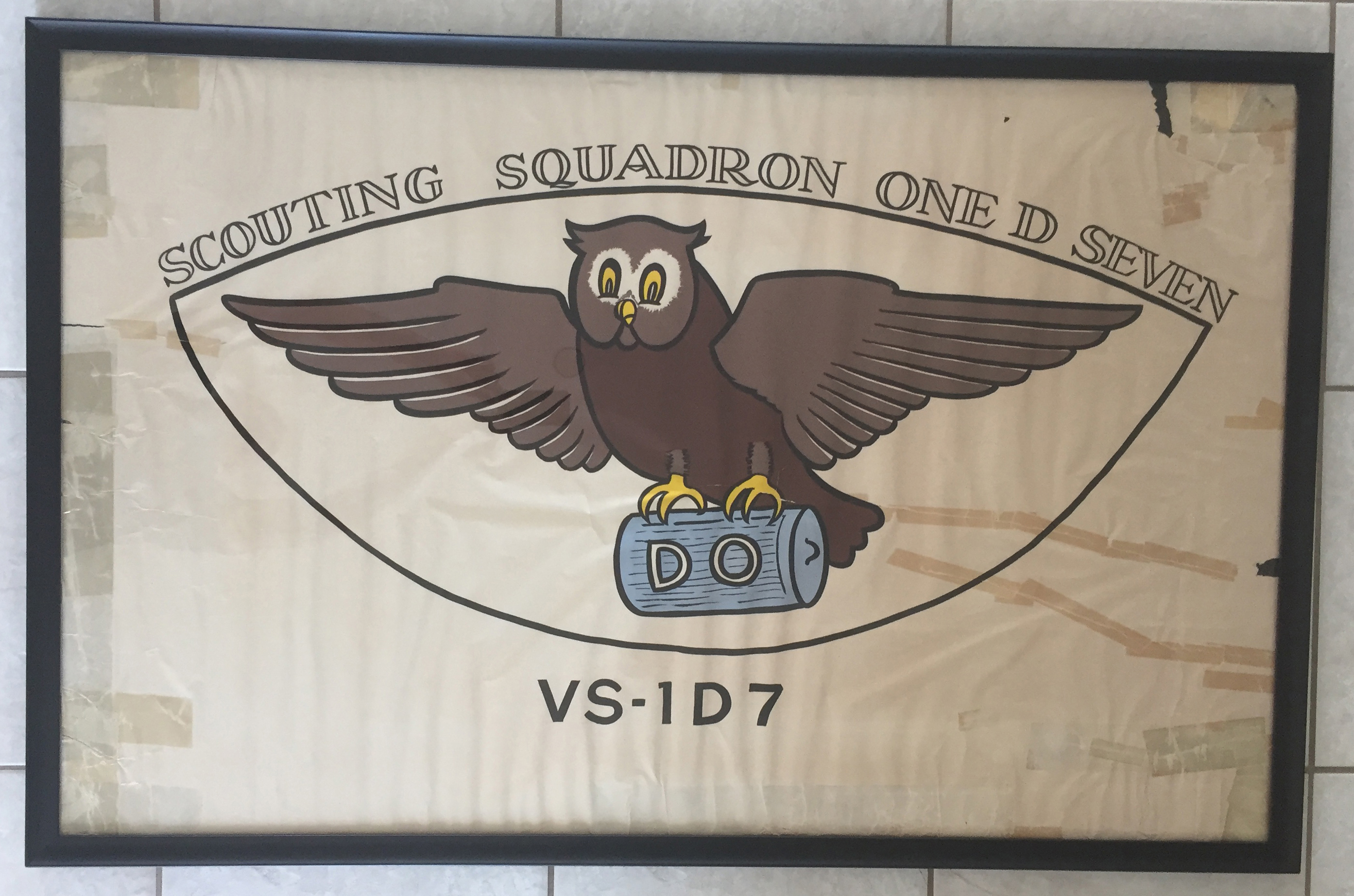
VS-1D7 Squadron emblem while at Naval Air Station Banana River

- Transition Training Squadron Atlantic (detachment)
- VS-1D7

==== Flight 19 probe ====
Three months after the end of World War II, on 5 December 1945, NAS Banana River had an ancillary role in the search for Flight 19, five TBM Avenger torpedo bombers that had departed Naval Air Station Fort Lauderdale, Florida on a routine over-water training mission. When the flight failed to return to home station, multiple air and naval units undertook a search and rescue operation. After sunset on 5 December, two PBM Mariner seaplanes from NAS Banana River, originally scheduled for their own training flights, were diverted to perform square pattern searches in the area west of 29°N 79°W/29, -79. One of these aircraft, a PBM-5, Bureau Number (BuNo) 59225, took off at 19:27 Eastern Time from NAS Banana River, called in a routine radio message at 19:30 Eastern Time, and was never heard from again.

At 19:50 Eastern Time, the tanker SS Gaines Mills reported seeing a mid-air explosion, then flames leaping 100 feet (30 m) high and burning on the sea for 10 minutes. The position was 28°35′N 80°15′W / 28.59, −80.25. Captain Shonna Stanley of the SS Gaines Mills reported searching for survivors through a pool of oil but found none. The escort carrier USS Solomons (CVE-67) reported losing radar contact with an aircraft at the same position and time. No wreckage of PBM-5 BuNo 59225 was ever found.

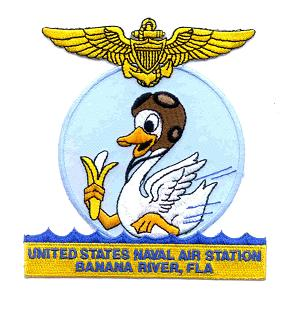
NAS Banana River patch

During a board of inquiry investigation regarding the entire Flight 19 incident, attention was given to the loss of the NAS Banana River-based PBM. Several witnesses from both NAS Banana River and other PBM Mariner operating locations were questioned concerning occurrences of aviation gasoline (AvGas) fumes collecting in the bilges of PBM series aircraft and associated no-smoking regulations, which were reportedly well posted and rigidly enforced aboard all PBMs. Although the board's report is not a verbatim record and no accusations were made, there seems to be enough inference present to cause one to suspect that the board was aware of the PBM's nickname as "the flying gas tank." As such, it is possible that the PBM-5 was destroyed by an explosion resulting from either (a) violation of the no-smoking regulations in the aircraft or (b) a stray electrical spark in the lower aircraft hull that may have ignited AvGas fumes in the bilges.

==== Land pollution ====
The Navy buried its solid waste southeast of the base, on private land, from 1942 to 1947. The dump was estimated at up to 52 acres (21 ha), of which 25 acres (10 ha) may be eligible for a federal government funding cleanup. Discarded material probably included munitions and practice bombs.

Contractors bought the land, naming it "South Patrick Shores". They constructed housing on it from 1956 to 1961. Homeowners had no mandatory solid waste removal until 1982.

Residents reported health complaints starting in the 1990s and again in 2018. Responding to these complaints, the U.S. Army Corps of Engineers investigated the site to determine whether a cleanup was necessary.

==== Transition ====
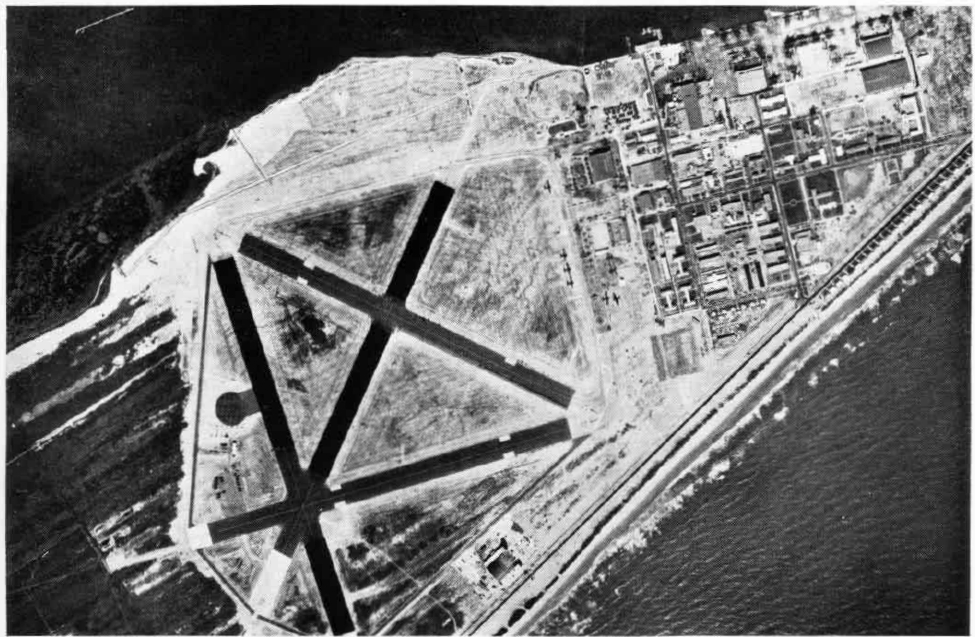
Aerial view of NAS Banana River in the mid-1940s

NAS Banana River closed in September 1947 after a gradual deactivation and was placed in a caretaker status. In September 1948, the facility was transferred to the U.S. Air Force. Several of NAS Banana River's original structures, including runway segments, particular hangars, support buildings, seaplane parking areas and seaplane ramps into the Banana River remain part of modern-day Patrick Space Force Base.

=== Use under the United States Air Force ===
NAS Banana River was transferred to the United States Air Force on 1 September 1948 and renamed the Joint Long Range Proving Ground on 10 June 1949. The installation was renamed Patrick Air Force Base in August 1950.

From 1966 to 1975, the Space Coast was the second-most-visited spot by VIPs, after Washington, D.C., due to the Space Program. A protocol officer was assigned to Patrick to coordinate these visits, about three weekly, consisting of 10 to 150 people.

In 1971, the Defense Equal Opportunity Management Institute (DEOMI) was established at Patrick AFB.

Five of the victims of the Khobar Towers bombing in 1996 were home stationed at Patrick AFB as part of the 71st Rescue Squadron (71 RQS). The 71 RQS relocated to Moody AFB, Georgia, in 1997.

The 9/11 attacks prompted the Air Force to close the heavily used four-lane State Road A1A, which ran immediately in front of the AFTAC Headquarters building. A1A was later reopened to two-lane traffic with car inspections, followed by two-lane traffic without inspections until a barrier was constructed in front of the building, and the building was reinforced with steel and concrete with the windows sealed.

In February 2005, the Patrick AFB Officers Club was destroyed by an accidental fire.

In 2010, the Air Force announced its intention to replace the existing AFTAC building in front of State Road A1A with a new facility costing $100 million to $200 million. At the time of this announcement, this constituted the largest single military construction (MILCON) project in the United States for the Air Force. Completed in 2014, the new facility is a 276,000-square-foot (25,600 m^{2}) multistory command and control building with a 38,000-square-foot (3,500 m^{2}) radiochemistry laboratory, 18,000-square-foot (1,700 m^{2}) central utility plant and a 600-space 180,000-square-foot (17,000 m^{2}) parking garage located approximately 1/4 mile (0.40 km) west of the original AFTAC headquarters building.

US Navy Boeing E-6 Mercury aircraft, part of Operation Looking Glass, were sometimes seen at Patrick AFB during the 2010–2011 time frame and were often mistaken by onlookers for the previously retired VC-137 Presidential aircraft (i.e. Air Force One), which looks similar.

=== Use under the United States Space Force ===
Following the establishment of the United States Space Force on 20 December 2019, the base was transferred from the Air Force. The facility was due to be renamed Patrick Space Force Base in February or March 2020, but this was postponed due to the COVID-19 pandemic. The facility, alongside Cape Canaveral SFS, became the first two facilities to bear the name of the new branch at a ceremony with Vice President Mike Pence on 9 December 2020.

== Operational history ==
On 17 May 1950, the base was renamed the "Long Range Proving Ground Base" but three months later was renamed "Patrick Air Force Base", in honor of Major General Mason Patrick.

On 3 May 1951, the Long Range Proving Ground Division was assigned to the newly created Air Research and Development Command. The following month the division was redesignated the Air Force Missile Test Center.

Cost comparison studies in the early 1950s indicated the desirability of letting contractors operate the station. Pan American World Services signed the first range contract on 31 December 1953. The Air Force Missile Test Center began transferring property and equipment to Pan American World Services at the end of that year. Pan American operated under contract to the Air Force for the next 34 years (until early October 1988). In 1988, the old range contract was divided into the Range Technical Services (RTS) and the Launch Base Services (LBS) contracts. The RTS contract was awarded to Computer Sciences Raytheon (CSR) in June 1988, and the LBS contract was awarded to Pan American World Services (later known as Johnson Controls) in August 1988.

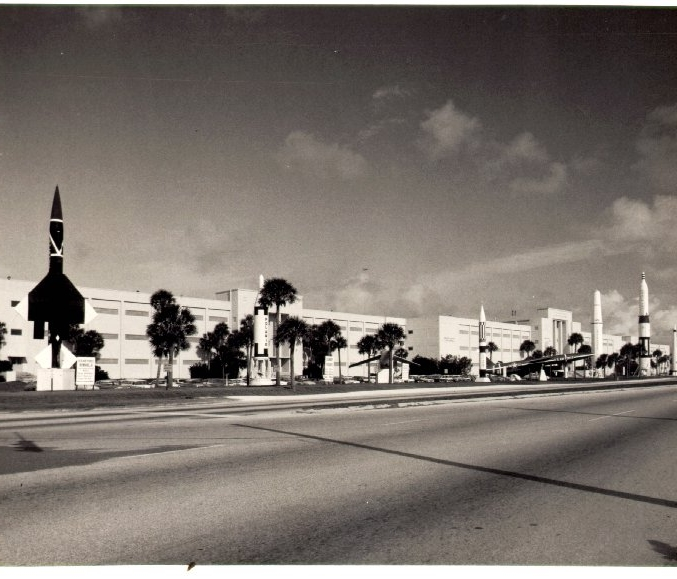
Rocket and missile display in front of the Air Force Technical Applications Center, Patrick AFB, Florida, c. 1970. These static displays have since been relocated to the Air Force Space and Missile Museum at Cape Canaveral SFS.

The Eastern Range supported various missile, crewed, and uncrewed space programs in the 1960s, making it a regular focus of media attention. In the 1960s, a test range office at Patrick AFB with a missile backdrop was used to film scenes for the TV sitcom I Dream of Jeannie, which was set in nearby Cocoa Beach (no cast was present). But by the mid-1970s, the demise of the Apollo space program and the end of land-based ballistic missile development at nearby Cape Canaveral Air Force Station signaled a downturn in fortunes, and on 1 February 1977, the "Air Force Eastern Test Range" organization was inactivated and its functions transferred to Detachment 1 of the Space and Missile Test Center (SAMTEC) until the activation of the Eastern Space and Missile Center in 1979 on 1 October 1979. In 1990, ESMC was transferred from the inactivating Air Force Systems Command (AFSC) to the newly established Air Force Space Command (AFSPC). On 12 November 1991, ESMC was inactivated, and the 45th Space Wing (45 SW) assumed its remaining functions.

=== Aerospace Defense Command use ===
In 1961, Patrick AFB began hosting a joint Federal Aviation Administration/Air Defense Command (later Aerospace Defense Command) joint-use radar site featuring an AN/FPS-66 general surveillance radar set for air defense of the Patrick AFB/Cape Canaveral area. Designated site "Z-211" (FAA J-05), the 645th Radar Squadron was reactivated on 28 June 1962 to operate the radar, feeding data to Semi Automatic Ground Environment Data Center DC-09 at Gunter AFB, Alabama.

Aerospace Defense Command operated the radar until 25 April 1976, when it was replaced by a detachment of the 20th Air Defense Squadron (OLA-A). The USAF radar was removed around 1988. After its closure by the Air Force, the facility was turned over to the Federal Aviation Administration (FAA).

The former Aerospace Defense Command site was replaced by a new site near Melbourne, Florida, as part of the Joint Surveillance System, designated by NORAD as Southeast Air Defense Sector Ground Equipment Facility "J-5", with a new ARSR-4 radar.

=== Strategic Air Command use ===
The 9th Strategic Reconnaissance Wing (9 SRW) of the Strategic Air Command established Operating Location OLYMPIC FLAME (OL-OF), a new Lockheed U-2 aircraft operating location at Patrick AFB, Florida, on 29 January 1982. OL-OF was subsequently redesignated as 9 SRW, Detachment 5 on 1 January 1983 and concentrated on reconnaissance operations (to include MIDAS and HICAT) over Central America and the Caribbean basin, replacing an operational capability that had previously been resident at nearby McCoy AFB until that installation's closure in 1975. Detachment 5 was inactivated at Patrick AFB in 1992.

=== Major commands / field commands assigned ===
- Air Proving Ground Command, 1 October 1949
- Air Research and Development Command, 14 May 1951

Redesignated: Air Force Systems Command, 1 April 1961

- Air Force Space Command, 1 October 1991– 20 December 2019
- Space Operations Command, 20 December 2019 - 11 May 2021
- Space Systems Command, 11 May 2021 – present

=== Major units assigned ===
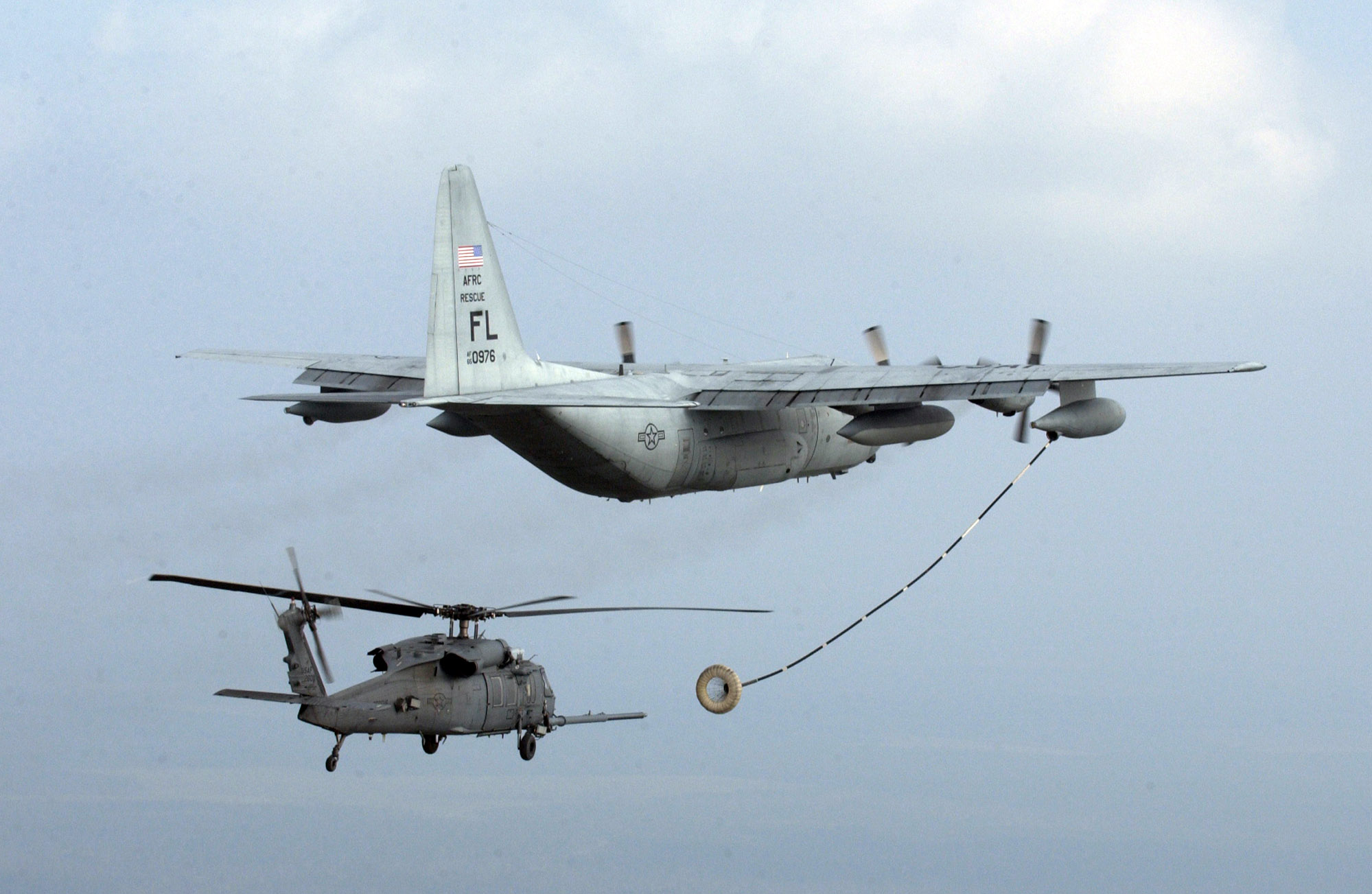
An HH-60G of the 920 RQW's 301 RQS prepares to aerial refuel from an HC-130P of the 920 RQW's 39 RQS.

- 2770th Standby Squadron, 20 November 1948 – 1 October 1949
- Joint Long Range Proving Ground, 11 May 1949

Redesignated: Florida Missile Test Range, 30 June 1951
Redesignated: Atlantic Missile Range, 1 July 1958
Redesignated: Air Force Eastern Test Range, 1 July 1964
Redesignated: Eastern Range, 12 November 1991–present

- Advance HQ, Joint Long Range Proving Ground, 1 October 1949 – 15 August 1950

Redesignated, 4820th Air Base Squadron, 15 August 1950 – 4 September 1951

- Air Force Eastern Test Range, 1 October 1949 – 1 February 1977

Det. 1 Space and Missile Test Center (SAMTEC), 1 February 1977 – 1 October 1979
Eastern Space & Missile Center (ESMC), 1 October 1979 – 1 November 1991

- 4800th Guided Missiles Wing, 3 December 1950

Redesignated: 6555th Guided Missile Wing, 14 May 1951
Redesignated: 6555th Guided Missile Group, 1 March 1953 – 7 September 1954

- 2d Mobile Communications Group, 1 October 1975

Redesignated: 2nd Combat Communications Group, 24 March 1976 – 30 June 1990

- 4802d (later 6555th) Guided Missile Squadron, 10 April 1951 – 15 August 1959

Inactivated and reactivated as: 6555th Guided Missile Group, 15 August 1959
Redesignated: 6555th Test Wing, 21 December 1959
Redesignated: 6555th Aerospace Test Wing, 25 October 1961
Redesignated: 6555th Aerospace Test Group, 1 April 1970 – 1 October 1990

- 4800th Guided Missiles Wing, 3 December 1950

Redesignated: 6555th Guided Missile Wing, 14 May 1951
Redesignated: 6555th Guided Missile Group, 1 March 1953 – 7 September 1954

- 550th Guided Missiles Wing, 11–29 December 1950
- 4802d (later 6555th) Guided Missile Squadron, 10 April 1951 – 15 August 1959

Inactivated and reactivated as: 6555th Guided Missile Group, 15 August 1959
Redesignated: 6555th Test Wing, 21 December 1959
Redesignated: 6555th Aerospace Test Wing, 25 October 1961
Redesignated: 6555th Aerospace Test Group, 1 April 1970 – 1 October 1990

- 6550th Air Base Wing, 4 September 1951 – 1 March 1953

Redesignated: 6550th Air Base Group, 1 March 1953 – 1 October 1990
Redesignated: 1040th Space Support Group, 1 October 1990 – 12 November 1991
Redesignated: 45th Support Group, 12 November 1991 – present

- Air Force Eastern Test Range, 1 October 1949 – 1 February 1977

Det. 1 Space and Missile Test Center (SAMTEC), 1 February 1977 – 1 October 1979
Eastern Space & Missile Center (ESMC), 1 October 1979 – 1 November 1991

- 6541st Missile Test Wing, 4 September 1951 – 7 September 1954
- Space Launch Delta 45 (previously 45th Space Wing) on 12 November 1991–present

45th Support Group became subordinate of Wing
Eastern Space & Missile Center became subordinate of Wing

- 920th Rescue Wing, 15 April 1997 – present

Established as 920th Rescue Group, 15 April 1997
Redesignated 920th Rescue Wing, 1 April 2003

- 114th Space Control Squadron (Florida Air National Guard), 20 May 1989 – present

Reference for history summation, major commands assigned and major units assigned:

== Role and operations ==
=== 45th Space Wing ===
The host wing for Patrick SFB is the Space Launch Delta 45, whose personnel manage all launches of uncrewed rockets at Cape Canaveral Space Force Station (CCSFS) 12 miles to the north. These rockets include satellites for the Department of Defense, including the National Reconnaissance Office (NRO) and the National Security Agency (NSA), as well as scientific payload launches in support of NASA, weather satellite launches in support of National Oceanic and Atmospheric Administration (NOAA), payloads in support of international customers such as the European Space Agency, and commercial payloads for various corporate communications entities. Units and individuals from the 45th Space Wing-now-SLD 45 have deployed abroad during wartime, most notably during the War in Afghanistan (2001–2021) and the 2003 invasion of Iraq.

=== Air Force Technical Applications Center ===
The Air Force Technical Applications Center (AFTAC) is a tenant command headquartered at Patrick SFB. Previously an activity of the Air Force Intelligence, Surveillance and Reconnaissance Agency (AFISRA), AFTAC became a subordinate unit of Twenty-Fifth Air Force (25 AF) and now the Sixteenth Air Force (Air Forces Cyber), both of Air Combat Command (ACC). AFTAC is the sole Department of Defense agency operating and maintaining a global network of nuclear event detection sensors.

=== 920th Rescue Wing ===
The 920th Rescue Wing (920 RQW), part of Air Force Reserve Command (AFRC), is another tenant command headquartered at Patrick SFB and is the installation's only military flying unit. An Air Combat Command (ACC)-gained combat search and rescue (CSAR) organization, the 920 RQW is the only rescue wing in the Air Force Reserve, operating the HC-130P/N "King" variant of the C-130 Hercules and HH-60G Pave Hawk helicopter, ready for worldwide deployment. In addition to its CSAR mission, the wing also participates in civilian rescue operations, ranging from rescue support for NASA crewed spaceflight operations, to augmentative support to U.S. Coast Guard search and rescue (SAR) operations, to Defense Support to Civil Authorities (DSCA) in the wake of major disasters. Most notable is the 920th's role in crewed spaceflight support to NASA, providing Eastern Range monitoring and having provided search and rescue support for Space Shuttle launches originating from Kennedy Space Center (KSC). Additional operations have included searching the Caribbean for downed aircraft, as well as retrieving critically ill sailors and passengers from ships hundreds of miles out in the Atlantic, often at night and/or in bad weather. Because the USAF HH-60 can refuel in flight from the USAF HC-130, MC-130, or USMC KC-130, it possesses a much greater range and mission radius versus similar military helicopters lacking such capability. The 920 RQW is a full participant in the Air Force's Air and Space Expeditionary Task Force (AEF) operating concept. Under this concept, the bulk of the wing deployed to Iraq in 2003 in support of Operation Iraqi Freedom. Subsequent AEF deployments have included Djibouti and Afghanistan in support of Operation Enduring Freedom.

=== U.S. State Department ===
The U.S. State Department's Bureau for International Narcotics and Law Enforcement Affairs Air Wing helps foreign countries combat drugs and narcotics criminals. The Bureau operates a fleet of aircraft, primarily former USAF and USMC OV-10 and former USAF C-27 aircraft at Patrick SFB to help detect and interdict the drug trade in Bolivia, Colombia, Peru and Afghanistan.

== Based units ==
Units marked GSU are Geographically Separate Units, which, although based at Patrick, are subordinate to a parent unit based at another location.

See Cape Canaveral Space Force Station for units of the 45th Space Wing permanently based there.

=== United States Space Force ===
Space Systems Command (SSC)

- Space Launch Delta 45 (host wing)
  - Headquarters Space Launch Delta 45
  - 45th Operations Group
    - Detachment 3
  - 45th Medical Group
    - 45th Aeromedical Dental Squadron
    - 45th Medical Operations Squadron
    - 45th Medical Support Squadron
  - 45th Mission Support Group
    - 45th Contracting Squadron
    - 45th Civil Engineer Squadron
    - 45th Force Support Squadron
    - 45th Logistics Readiness Squadron
    - 45th Security Forces Squadron
- Space Training and Readiness Command
  - 17th Test Squadron
    - Detachment 3 (GSU)

=== United States Air Force ===
Air Combat Command (ACC)

- Sixteenth Air Force
  - Air Force Technical Applications Center

Air National Guard (ANG)

- Florida Air National Guard
  - 114th Space Control Squadron

Air Force Reserve Command (AFRC)

- Tenth Air Force
  - 920th Rescue Wing
    - Headquarters 920th Rescue Wing
    - 920th Operations Group
      - 39th Rescue Squadron – HC-130J Combat King II
      - 301st Rescue Squadron – HH-60G Pave Hawk
      - 308th Rescue Squadron
      - 920th Operations Support Squadron
    - 920th Maintenance Group
      - 720th Aircraft Maintenance Squadron – HC-130J Combat King II
      - 920th Aircraft Maintenance Squadron – HH-60G Pave Hawk
      - 920th Maintenance Squadron
    - 920th Mission Support Group
      - 920th Communications Flight
      - 920th Force Support Squadron
      - 920th Logistics Readiness Squadron
      - 920th Security Forces Squadron
    - 920th Aeromedical Staging Squadron

=== United States Department of State ===
Bureau of International Narcotics and Law Enforcement Affairs

- INL Air Wing – various aircraft
  - Headquarters INL Air Wing

== Infrastructure and facilities ==
There is a portion of property of the Patrick SFB located in the Satellite Beach city limits.

=== Buildings ===
The base has the Space Coast Inn for visiting personnel, dormitories for permanent party single enlisted personnel, quarters for families in three separate housing areas, recreational housing on the beach, beach access, combined officers and enlisted clubs, Commissary, a large AAFES base exchange (BX), library and numerous Morale, Welfare and Recreation (MWR) facilities.

Facilities are used by 4,000 military men and women, 11,500 civilian workers, contractors, and dependents, 43,000 military retirees, and 82,000 members of retirees' families.

There are several chapels, including Chapel One, Chapel Two, South Chapel at the South Housing area, and Seaside Chapel (Building 440). A "45th Space Wing Chapel" travels with the Wing when it is deployed. The Catholic Group is called "St. George Parish" and meets in Chapel One or Two. While the buildings are owned by the Space Force, the Catholic Parish is under the spiritual direction of the Roman Catholic Archdiocese for the Military Services, USA.

In 2009, base housing was privatized and, in addition to active duty personnel and their families, also became available for lease by members of the Reserve and Guard, military retirees, Department of Defense civil service employees, and DOD contractors.

In 2010–2012, the 74,000-square-foot (6,900 m^{2}) medical clinic underwent a major remodel project. It was estimated to cost $18.5 million.

In 2020, the Satellite Pharmacy and Dental Clinic were remodeled to bring current with today's standard of care under DHA (Defense Health Administration), and the construction of a new 74,000-square-foot medical clinic was started. It was expected to cost $18.5 million.

=== Access ===
Patrick Space Force Base lies on a barrier island. It is primarily accessed from the mainland by the Pineda Causeway (State Road 404) in Satellite Beach, or State Road A1A which runs the entire length of Patrick SFB.

=== Water ===
The base obtains potable water from the city of Cocoa. A single potable water line from Cocoa runs under the Sykes Creek Bridge at Sea Ray Drive.

== Media ==
The Missileer was published by the base weekly until 28 September 2012. It was discontinued due to defense budget cutbacks due to sequestration. A local paper, Florida Today, publishes The Shark Pride weekly as a replacement for the former publication.

== Education ==
Dependent children living in the associated housing, which is owned by a private entity and is not on-post, are zoned to Brevard Public Schools schools. Pelican Coast is zoned to Holland Elementary School, DeLaura Middle School, and Satellite Beach High School. Oceanside and River's Edge are zoned to Roosevelt Elementary School and Cocoa Beach Junior/Senior High School; school bus transportation is provided to those schools.

== Amateur radio restrictions ==
The US Code of Federal Regulations specifies that amateur radio operators within 322 kilometers (200 mi) of Patrick must not transmit with more than 50 watts of power on the 70-centimeter band.

== See also ==
- Department of Defense Manned Space Flight Support Office
- Joint Functional Component Command for Space and Global Strike
- Naval air station
- Original Melbourne Village Hall

== Other sources ==
- This article incorporates public domain material from the Air Force Historical Research Agency
- This article incorporates public domain material from Patrick Space Force Base. United States government.
- Cornett, Lloyd H; Johnson, Mildred W (1980). A Handbook of Aerospace Defense Organization, 1946 – 1980 (PDF). Peterson AFB, CO: Office of History, Aerospace Defense Center. Archived from the original (PDF) on 13 February 2016.
- Mueller, Robert (1989). Air Force Bases, Vol. I, Active Air Force Bases Within the United States of America on 17 September 1982 (PDF). Washington, DC: Office of Air Force History. ISBN 0-912799-53-6.
- Ravenstein, Charles A. (1984). Air Force Combat Wings, Lineage & Honors Histories 1947–1977. Washington, DC: Office of Air Force History. ISBN 0-912799-12-9.
- History of the 45th Wing
- 71st Rescue Squadron
