= Computer Sciences Raytheon =

Joint venture partnership of Computer Sciences Corporation and Raytheon

- Company type: joint venture
- Founded: 1988
- Headquarters: Patrick Space Force Base, Florida

Computer Sciences Raytheon (CSR) is a joint venture partnership between Computer Sciences Corporation and Raytheon Technical Services Company. CSR is the contractor that has managed the Eastern Test Range since 1988. CSR is headquartered at Patrick Space Force Base, Florida.

== History ==
In October 1988, CSR took over management of the Eastern Range through the Range Technical Services contract, replacing Pan American World Service and subcontractor General Electric (formerly RCA Service Company). On August 23, 2007, it was announced that CSR had been awarded the current Eastern Range Technical Services contract to continue managing the Eastern Range for the foreseeable future.

== Locations ==
Besides Patrick Space Force Base, CSR operations include the following locations:

- Cape Canaveral Space Force Station
- Jonathon Dickinson Missile Tracking Annex
- Antigua Air Station
- Ascension Auxiliary Air Field

== See also ==
- Pan American Airways Guided Missile Range Division
