= Malabar Transmitter Annex =

U.S. Space Force auxiliary communications facility

Coordinates: 28°1′17.41″N 80°40′48.20″W

The Malabar Transmitter Annex is currently used as an auxiliary communications annex in support of space activities for NASA and the U.S. Space Force. The facility is under the control of the Space Launch Delta 45 as an annex of Patrick Space Force Base. The annex was originally established as a naval airfield in 1943. Located in the southwestern region of Brevard County, within what is now the city of Palm Bay, the airfield was originally constructed with four 4,000-foot runways. It was decommissioned as an active aviation facility in the mid-1950s.

== History ==
The airfield was built in 1943 by the U.S. Navy as Naval Outlying Landing Field Malabar, one of two satellite airfields for then-Naval Air Station Melbourne, which conducted advanced flight training in North American SNJs, Grumman F4F Wildcats and Grumman F6F Hellcats.

The NOLF Malabar airfield was constructed in early 1943 but was not depicted on the January 1943 Miami Sectional Chart. Early depictions of the airfield include USDA aerial photos from February 24, 1943, which show four unfinished paved runways. By April 22, 1943, NOLF Malabar had four asphalt runways. The earliest chart depiction which has been located of the Malabar airfield is on the July 1943 Orlando Sectional Chart depicting "Malabar (Navy)" as an auxiliary airfield. It was still indicated as an active military airfield, labeled as "Malabar (Navy)", on the 1949 Orlando Sectional Chart, and described as having a 4,000 feet (1,200 m) hard-surface runway.

The airfield was closed in 1954. It was still listed as an active airfield on the August 1954 Orlando Sectional Chart, but the Aerodromes table on the chart listed its status as "Closed, leased for grazing" at this point. It was subsequently transferred to the U.S. Air Force as a non-flying facility in the mid-1950s, placed under the administration of the then-Air Force Missile Test Center (AFMTC) at nearby then-Patrick Air Force Base, and fenced from public access. It was subsequently renamed the Malabar Transmitter Annex in support of Department of Defense and National Aeronautics and Space Administration crewed and uncrewed space launch operations.

The Malabar Test Facility, a tenant activity of the then-Air Force Systems Command, was opened in the early 1960s to study lasers and laser effects. Also known as "Operating Location Alpha Golf (OL-AG), it was subsequently transferred to the Space and Missile Systems Organization in 1978, the then-Air Force Space Command's Air Force Space Technology Center in 1984, and the Air Force Systems Command's (later the Air Force Materiel Command's) Phillips Laboratory in 1990. By the mid-1990s, the test facility's activities were relocated to Kirtland Air Force Base, New Mexico under the aegis of the Air Force Research Laboratory (AFRL) and the test facility at Malabar was inactivated.

The former Malabar airfield property was erroneously labeled "Lynbrook Park" on a 2007 street map.

The Malabar facility continues to be used for periodic military ground training activities by Space Launch Delta 45 (SLD 45), the Air Force Reserve Command's 920th Rescue Wing (920 RQW) at Patrick SFB, and various U.S. Army Reserve and the Florida Army National Guard (FLARNG) units in Florida.

In December 2021, following discussions with the former 45th Space Wing and current SLD 45, it was also announced that the Florida Army National Guard would construct a new 59,000 square foot FLARNG Readiness Center on 55 acres in the north central portion of the Malabar Transmitter Annex with initial site work estimated to begin in late 2023. With military construction (MILCON) shared between the Department of Defense and the State of Florida, the state share of funding for this facility was later redirected by the State of Florida and the plans subsequently revised, downscaling it to a 36,500 square foot facility. The State of Florida share of its construction is currently unfunded. The Department of the Navy is also envisioning the construction of a 55,500 square foot Navy Reserve Center at Malabar Annex, consolidating existing Navy Reserve Centers in Orlando and West Palm Beach.

== Operations ==
There were previously approximately a dozen antenna towers around the facility, as well as log periodics. The primary function was to act as a remote transmitter site to support operations for the Kennedy Space Center and Cape Canaveral Space Force Station. As of June 1, 2010 all the large antennas have been removed. Only one tower remains for microwave communications.

The facility remains under military security with an annual firearms drill held on site for security personnel. As a military installation, it remains under the control of Space Launch Delta 45 (formerly the 45th Space Wing) at Patrick Space Force Base.
