= Transition Training Squadron Atlantic =

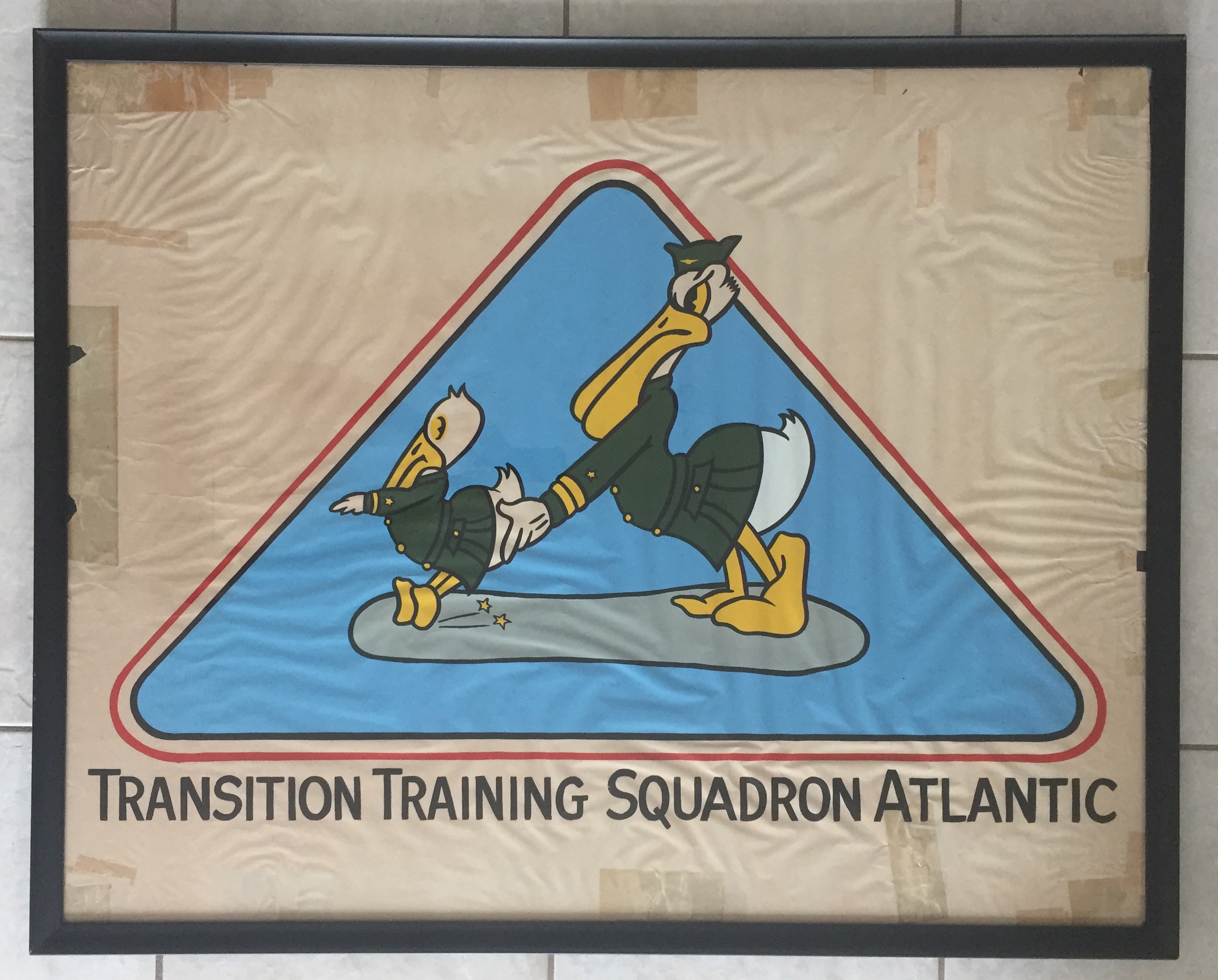
- Squadron Emblem
- Active: 28 July 1941 to ?
- Country: United States
- Branch: United States Navy
- Garrison/HQ: Naval Air Station Norfolk; Naval Air Station Banana River; Glenn L. Martin Company

Transition Training Squadron Atlantic was a United States Navy training squadron in World War II. It was established on 28 July 1941 upon redesigned of the Operational Training Squadron of the Atlantic Fleet. It was stationed at Naval Air Station Norfolk, Virginia, with one detachment at Naval Air Station Banana River, Florida and one detachment at Glenn L. Martin Company, Middle River, Maryland. It fell under the Commander, Naval Air Force U.S. Atlantic Fleet.

The mission of the squadron was "to give advanced patrol plane training to newly graduated naval aviators, fresh from training centers, prior to assignment to Patrol plane units in the fleets."
