= Melbourne Village, Florida =

Town in the state of Florida, United States

- Town
- Town of Melbourne Village
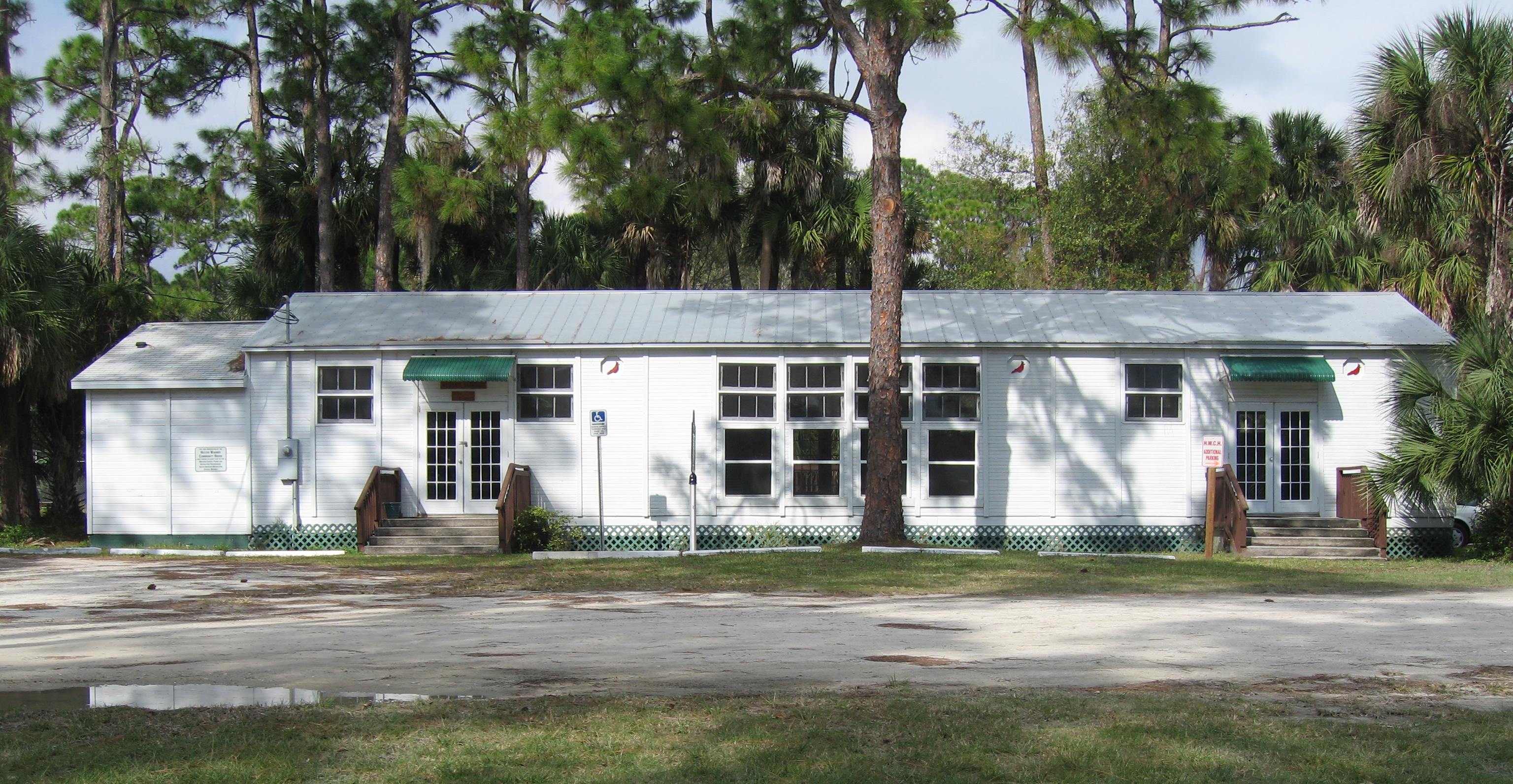
- The Original Melbourne Village Town Hall

- Seal
- Motto: "The Town That Really Cares!"
- Location in Brevard County and the state of Florida
- Coordinates: 28°05′17″N 80°39′54″W
- Country: United States
- State: Florida
- County: Brevard
- Founded: 1947
- Incorporated: 1957

Government
  - Type: Mayor-Commission
  - Mayor: Susan "Sue" Ditty
  - Vice Mayor: Bridget Foster
  - Commissioners: Fred Anderson, Norton Muzzone, Valerie Calenda, Scott Perrine, and Betty Jo Yorio
  - Town Clerk and Town Treasurer: Heather Roberts
  - Town Attorney: John Cary

Area
  - Total: 0.58 sq mi (1.51 km^{2})
  - Land: 0.58 sq mi (1.51 km^{2})
  - Water: 0 sq mi (0.00 km^{2})
- Elevation: 23 ft (7.0 m)

Population (2020)
  - Total: 681
  - Density: 1,171.5/sq mi (452.31/km^{2})
- Time zone: UTC-5 (Eastern (EST))
  - Summer (DST): UTC-4 (EDT)
- ZIP code: 32904
- Area code: 321
- FIPS code: 12-44075
- GNIS feature ID: 2406143
- Website: www.MelbourneVillage.org

Melbourne Village is a town in Brevard County, Florida. It is part of the Palm Bay–Melbourne–Titusville, Florida Metropolitan Statistical Area, and is the smallest incorporated municipality (by population) in Brevard County. The population was 681 at the 2020 US Census, up from 662 at the 2010 census.

== History ==
Virginia Wood, Elizabeth Nutting, and Margaret Hutchinson came from Dayton, Ohio in 1947, following the end of World War II to the area of Melbourne, Florida. Their goal was to establish a community for people seeking a lifestyle that was simple and close to nature. This social experiment was an “intentional community”, a response to the hardships of the Great Depression. The founders were influenced by the concepts and teachings of Ralph Borsodi, who also lived in Melbourne Village from 1950 to 1960. Many early residents cleared their land, built their own houses, and ran small home businesses, from organic gardening to raising chinchillas, in order to help support themselves and their families. There was a community store run on the honor system. Early families overcame the lack of construction materials for civilian use immediately following World War II by purchasing and relocating surplus military barracks from nearby bases. Two of these barracks still remain, one being the Original Melbourne Village Hall and the other a private residence.

The Town of Melbourne Village was incorporated in 1957 out of concern of being annexed by Melbourne or included in the subsequent incorporation of West Melbourne, Florida.

== Geography ==
According to the United States Census Bureau, the town has a total area of 0.6 square miles (1.0 km^{2}), primarily land, with several small ponds.

The village is surrounded by West Melbourne, except the northeastern portion of the town, where it is bordered by Melbourne.

=== Environment ===
Over 90% of lots are between 0.33 acres (0.13 ha) and 1.0 acre (0.40 ha), with houses nestled in among the native oaks and pines. It is common in Melbourne Village for a lot to have at least 30% canopy coverage, from mature live oaks and southern pines.

=== Climate ===
The climate in this area is characterized by hot, humid summers and generally mild winters. According to the Köppen climate classification, the Town of Melbourne Village has a humid subtropical climate zone (Cfa).

Climate data for Melbourne Village, FL
Month	Jan	Feb	Mar	Apr	May	Jun	Jul	Aug	Sep	Oct	Nov	Dec	Year
Record high °F (°C)	89 (32)	91 (33)	93 (34)	97 (36)	99 (37)	101 (38)	102 (39)	101 (38)	98 (37)	96 (36)	91 (33)	93 (34)	102 (39)
Mean daily maximum °F (°C)	71 (22)	74 (23)	77 (25)	81 (27)	86 (30)	89 (32)	91 (33)	91 (33)	88 (31)	84 (29)	79 (26)	73 (23)	82 (28)
Daily mean °F (°C)	60 (16)	63 (17)	66 (19)	71 (22)	77 (25)	81 (27)	82 (28)	82 (28)	81 (27)	76 (24)	70 (21)	63 (17)	73 (23)
Mean daily minimum °F (°C)	49 (9)	52 (11)	55 (13)	60 (16)	67 (19)	72 (22)	73 (23)	73 (23)	73 (23)	68 (20)	60 (16)	53 (12)	63 (17)
Record low °F (°C)	17 (−8)	27 (−3)	25 (−4)	35 (2)	47 (8)	55 (13)	60 (16)	60 (16)	57 (14)	41 (5)	30 (−1)	21 (−6)	17 (−8)
Average precipitation inches (mm)	2.27 (58)	2.63 (67)	3.28 (83)	2.13 (54)	3.29 (84)	6.71 (170)	5.96 (151)	7.68 (195)	7.64 (194)	5.06 (129)	2.88 (73)	2.57 (65)	52.10 (1,323)

== Demographics ==
Historical population
Census	Pop.	Note	%±
1960	458		—
1970	597		30.3%
1980	1,004		68.2%
1990	591		−41.1%
2000	706		19.5%
2010	662		−6.2%
2020	681		2.9%
U.S. Decennial Census

=== 2010 and 2020 census ===
Melbourne Village racial composition (Hispanics excluded from racial categories) (NH = Non-Hispanic)
Race	Pop 2010	Pop 2020	% 2010	% 2020
White (NH)	624	595	94.26%	87.37%
Black or African American (NH)	1	3	0.15%	0.44%
Native American or Alaska Native (NH)	4	3	0.60%	0.44%
Asian (NH)	11	9	1.66%	1.32%
Pacific Islander or Native Hawaiian (NH)	0	0	0.00%	0.00%
Some other race (NH)	0	0	0.00%	0.00%
Two or more races/Multiracial (NH)	0	31	0.00%	4.55%
Hispanic or Latino (any race)	22	40	3.32%	5.87%
Total	662	681		

As of the 2020 United States census, there were 681 people, 322 households, and 238 families residing in the town.

As of the 2010 United States census, there were 662 people, 285 households, and 201 families residing in the town.

=== 2000 census ===
As of the census of 2000, there were 706 people, 307 households, and 210 families residing in the town. The population density was 1,239.4 inhabitants per square mile (478.5/km^{2}). It has the smallest population of any municipality in the county.

In 2000, there were 325 housing units at an average density of 570.5 per square mile (220.3/km^{2}). The racial makeup of the town was 99.01% White, 0.71% Asian, and 0.28% from two or more races. Hispanic or Latino of any race were 1.27% of the population.

In 2000, there were 307 households, out of which 21.2% had children under the age of 18 living with them, 59.0% were married couples living together, 5.2% had a female householder with no husband present, and 31.3% were non-families. 25.4% of all households were made up of individuals, and 14.7% had someone living alone who was 65 years of age or older. The average household size was 2.30 and the average family size was 2.73.

In 2000, in the town, the population was spread out, with 17.8% under the age of 18, 3.5% from 18 to 24, 22.7% from 25 to 44, 29.7% from 45 to 64, and 26.2% who were 65 years of age or older. The median age was 49 years. For every 100 females, there were 93.4 males. For every 100 females age 18 and over, there were 95.3 males.

In 2000, the median income for a household in the town was $48,750, and the median income for a family was $60,000. Males had a median income of $51,058 versus $27,375 for females. The per capita income for the town was $27,782. About 2.6% of families and 6.4% of the population were below the poverty line, including 9.3% of those under age 18 and 3.3% of those age 65 or over.

== Government ==
The Town of Melbourne Village is governed by a Town Commission of seven members, one of whom is the Mayor/Commissioner. By town charter, these are unpaid positions. The Mayor and Commissioners are non-partisan positions and are elected in November during the general elections for two year terms. Terms are staggered, with three commission seats up for election each year plus the mayoral seat up every other year. Each year, the Commission elects one of their members as the Vice Mayor. The Commission meets at least once a month to deal with town business, in a modified "town hall"-style meeting. This form of government is a mixture of the "Council-Manager" and the "Mayor-Council" systems, as the Mayor is elected (rather than appointed) yet does have a vote on the Commission. While the Mayor is responsible for the day-to-day executive oversight and guidance for the town (in essence, the Town's "city manager"), the Commission can reverse or direct the Mayor's actions.

Three departments serve the town with paid employees: Administration, Public Works, and Public Safety. The latter has been contracted to the Brevard County Sheriff's Office.

=== American Homesteading Foundation ===
The American Homesteading Foundation (AHF) was the entity behind the founding of Melbourne Village. All homeowners in the town are given the option of being members of the AHF. The AHF was founded in 1946 by Virginia Wood, Elizabeth Nutting, and Margaret Hutchinson, and is a not-for-profit corporation and independent of the official municipality. The AHF serves the community by owning, maintaining, and operating all the community property within the town, and sponsors recreational and educational activities throughout the year. The community property includes approximately 45 acres (18 ha) of parks and paths, the Village Hall, and the AHF Swimming Pool. In its modern form, the main function of the AHF is sometimes described as an independent self-funded Parks and Recreation department for the town's residents.

=== Community involvement ===
More than 25 percent of the residents of Melbourne Village are routinely involved in committees and volunteer events. In the 2008 elections, voter turnout for Melbourne Village (Precinct 31) was 95 percent. Even in non-presidential election years, turnout is typically 60 percent to 80 percent.

=== Planned development ===
The Vision 2012 Committee was chartered by the Town Commission in March 2006, as a response to trends and concerns about recent construction that, if not addressed, could significantly change the existing neighborhood character via the larger size of structures, greater lot coverage, and the loss of green-space.

The result of this work was the Responsible Growth Plan, a set of ordinances that developed building coverage ranges for all lot sizes, devised incentive strategies to encourage homeowners and builders to minimize the visual and environmental impact of larger lot coverage, improved the town's code emphasis on tree canopy, green conservation, and native vegetation, and provided a way to manage all these objectives via the Town Review Board.

== Parks and recreation ==
Erna Nixon Park is a 54-acre (22 ha) park opened in 1976. It is a habitat for native plants, birds, and animals, including gopher tortoises, indigo snakes, and bobcats.

== See also ==
- Original Melbourne Village Hall
