= Original Melbourne Village Hall =

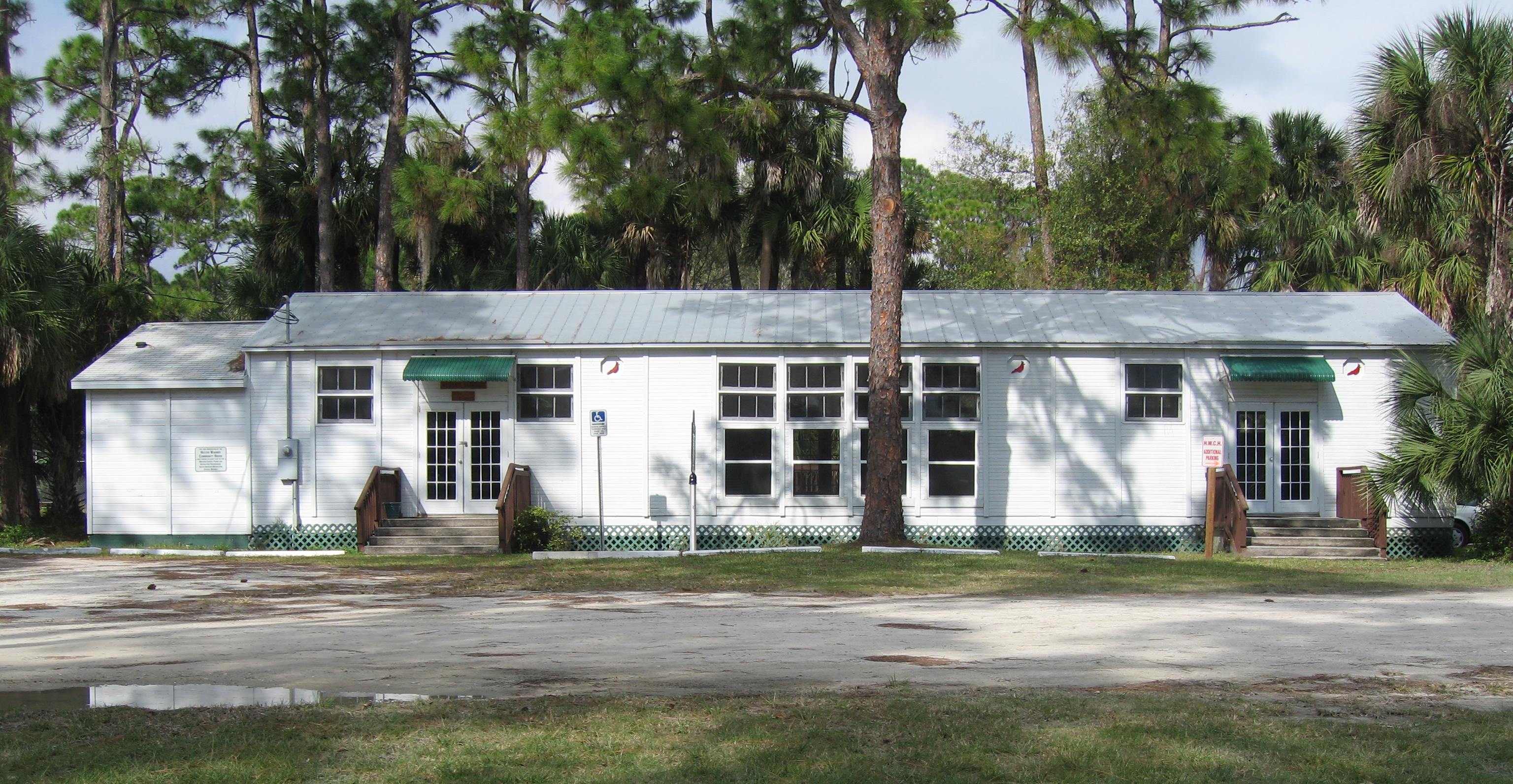
- Front View of Building
- Interactive map of the Original Melbourne Village Hall area

General information
- Architectural style: Military Barracks
- Location: Hall Road; Melbourne Village, Florida, United States
- Coordinates: 28.08481°N 80.66473°W
- Construction started: circa 1941

The Original Melbourne Village Hall is a historic building located on Hall Road in Melbourne Village, Florida, United States. This building was built circa 1941 during World War II to serve as a military barracks at the Naval Air Station Banana River. After World War II, the U.S. government declared the building surplus and subsequently sold it to the American Homesteading Foundation located in Melbourne Village.

In May 1948, the building was moved to its current location and used as a community center. Upon becoming incorporated, the Town of Melbourne Village used the building as office space from 1957 until 1963 when a new Town Hall was constructed. In December 2003, the Town completed restorations of the building and renamed it Hester Wagner Community House.

It is currently being used as an event venue and is available to rent.

== Gallery ==
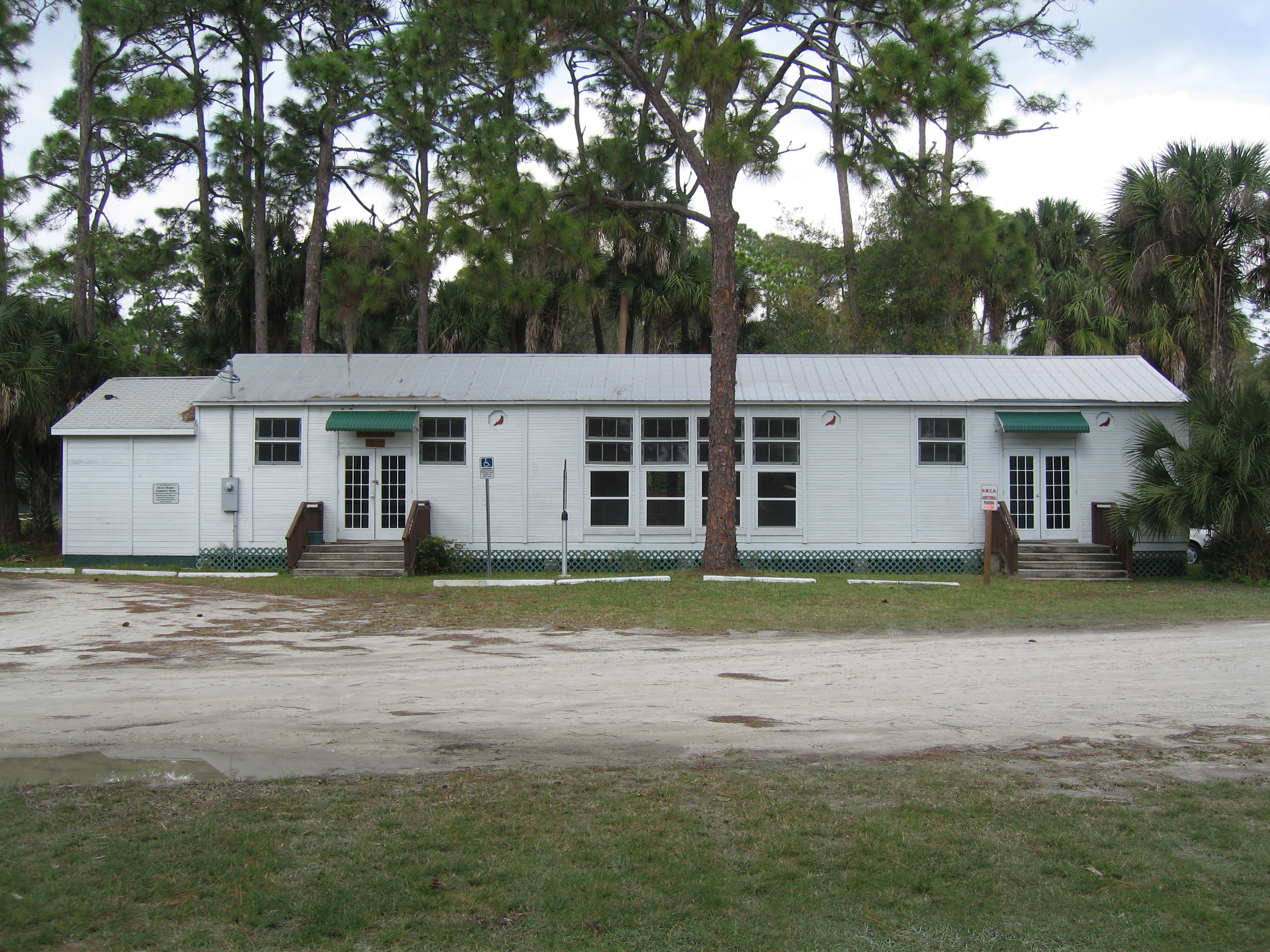
Additional front view of building

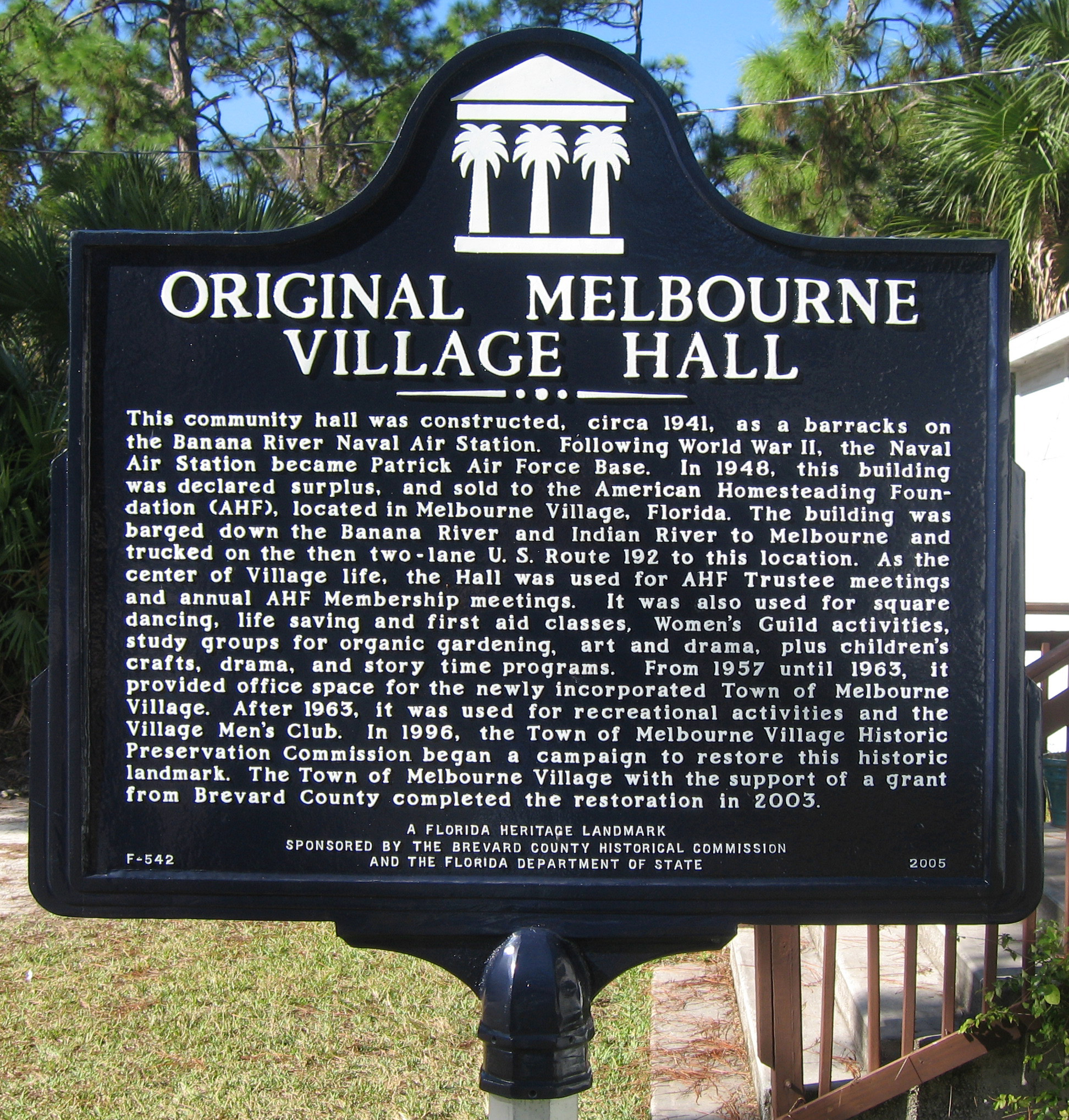
Historical marker at the Original Melbourne Village Hall

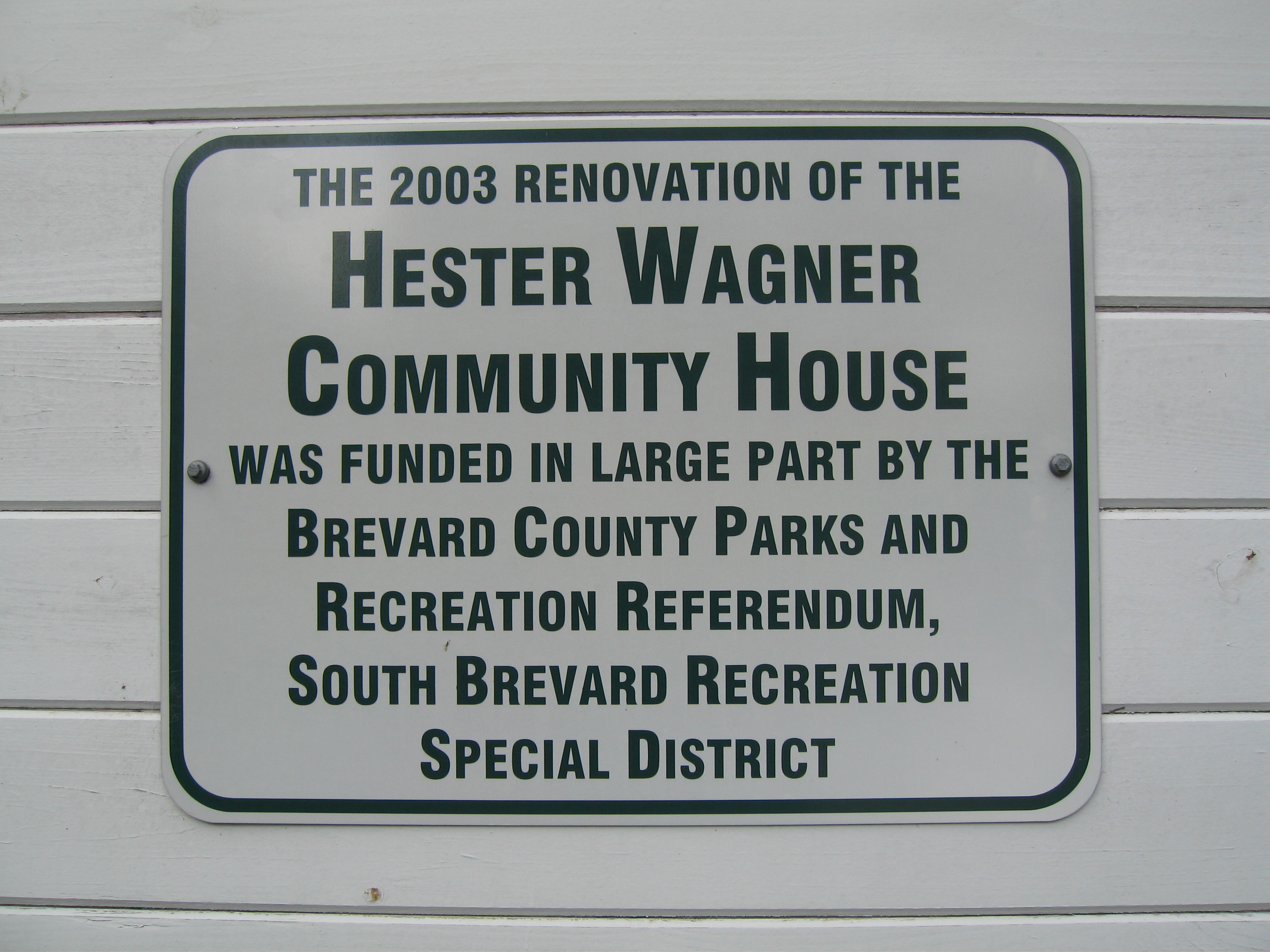
Sign on building

== See also ==
- Village hall
