= Department of Defense Manned Space Flight Support Office =

DoD support to NASA ended 2007

The Department of Defense Manned Space Flight Support Office (DDMS) coordinated all United States Department of Defense (DoD) contingency support to NASA's human spaceflight programs. The office was deactivated in 2007 and replaced by a staff element that is part of the United States Space Force's 45th Space Wing staff at Patrick Space Force Base in Florida.

The commander of U.S. Strategic Command (USSTRATCOM) was the DoD Manager for Manned Space Flight Support Operations. The 45th Space Wing commander at Patrick Space Force Base, Florida, was the Deputy DoD Manager. The DDMS offices and staff were located at Patrick SFB and were responsible for the day-to-day operations and support to NASA's human spaceflights. Additionally, DDMS maintained a Landing Support Office at the Johnson Space Center in Houston, Texas.

== History ==
Chartered in 1958 by the Secretary of Defense, DDMS was originally formed with the express purpose of providing much-needed DoD support to the U.S. initial crewed space flight effort ... putting people into space and returning them safely to Earth. Since then, the support office continued to be the focal point for all DoD contingency support to Project Mercury, Gemini, Apollo, Apollo/Soyuz Test Project and Space Shuttle. This support included astronaut and space capsule recovery, worldwide communications, tracking and data relay, public affairs, and medical support.

== Responsibilities ==
In the Space Shuttle program, DDMS had the responsibility for astronaut rescue and recovery, contingency landing site support, payload security, medical support, coordination of airlift/sealift for contingency operations, as well as other support services required in the event of a Shuttle emergency. To carry out these responsibilities, DDMS would receive and validate NASA requests for DoD support. The support office would then select assets best able to provide the required support, task selected units through appropriate command channels, and provide tactical control of those DoD forces supporting a specific Space Shuttle mission.

=== Assets ===
In the Kennedy Space Center area, U.S. Air Force air-refuelable HH-60 Pave Hawk helicopters, HC-130 tanker aircraft, pararescue and medical personnel, and U.S. Navy and Coast Guard ships are deployed to support launch contingencies and astronaut recovery. Additionally, the Navy provided a KC-130 tanker for helicopter air refueling, E-2C aircraft for enhanced air traffic control and P-3 Orion aircraft for search and rescue operations in the mid-Atlantic region. To support the potential for a Transoceanic Abort Landing (TAL), NASA selected four TAL sites in Spain and Africa. These sites were Morón and Zaragoza Air Bases in Spain; Ben Guerir Air Base, Morocco; and Yundum International Airport, Banjul, The Gambia. Three of these four TAL sites were activated for each shuttle launch. DDMS supported these TAL sites with C-12 or C-21 aircraft for on-scene weather reconnaissance and in-flight checks of Space Shuttle unique landing aids; C-130 aircraft with pararescue and medical support personnel; and DoD fire/crash/rescue equipment and personnel.

=== Operations ===
DDMS would operate the DoD Support Operations Center at Patrick SFB starting the day prior to a Space Shuttle launch and continuing through landing. Crewed by DDMS staff officers, the Support Operations Center would maintain 24-hour contact with those DoD forces and facilities around the world supporting each mission. The center was the DoD focal point for managing a contingency response in the event of a Shuttle emergency landing or astronaut bail out. The center, for example, played a key role in providing support to NASA in response to the Space Shuttle Columbia disaster in 2003.

=== Responsibilities in orbit ===
While a Space Shuttle orbiter was on orbit, designated DoD sites worldwide were ready to support a Shuttle contingency landing. The center would receive status reports from these locations during mission support periods. On landing day, the Support Operations Center would coordinate the DoD fire/crash/rescue support and medevac helicopters at Kennedy Space Center, Edwards Air Force Base, and Holloman Air Force Base.

=== Post-landing support ===
After landing at locations other than Kennedy Space Center, the Space Shuttle orbiter was ferried back to Florida on a Shuttle Carrier Aircraft. DDMS coordinates a U.S. Air Force C-141 "Pathfinder" aircraft to transport NASA personnel and equipment supporting ferry flight operations. The office personnel flew with the NASA team on these ferry flights, providing specialized support en route at DoD installation stops. Due to the unique weather sensitivities of ferry flights, a dedicated weather support team was also assembled to monitor en route weather. This included a DoD meteorologist to monitor weather conditions from the Cape Canaveral Forecast Facility in Florida, as well as a DoD meteorologist who traveled with the ferry flight team, providing direct en route weather support.

=== Commanders ===
Lt Col David Mahan

Lt Col Nick Pettit

Lt Col Richard Bolton

Lt Col Michael Thompson

Lt Col Jason Havel

Lt Col Michael McClure
