= VS-1D7 =

Scouting Squadron 1-D7
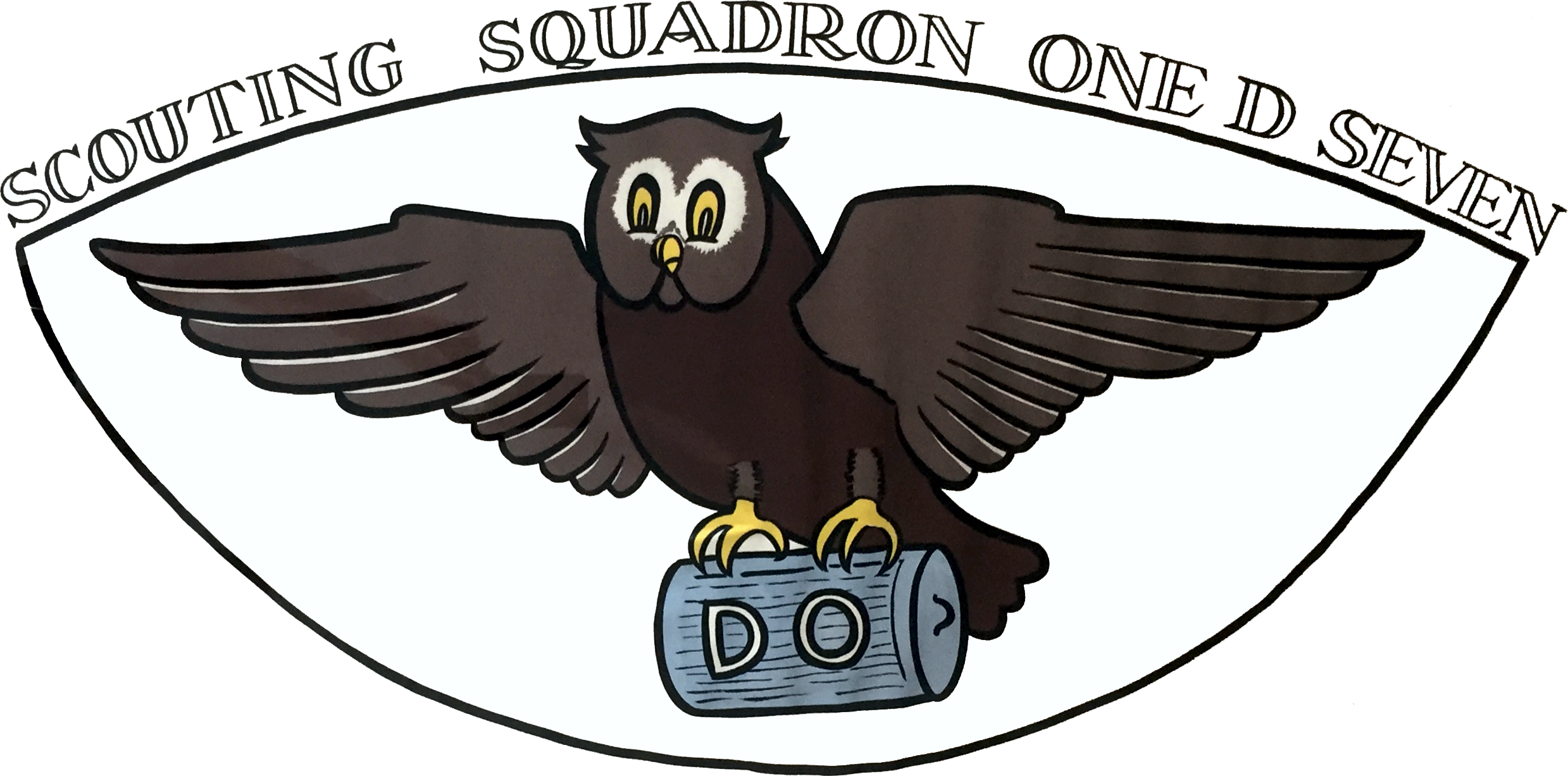
- Squadron Emblem
- Active: 12 March 1942 – 1 October 1968
- Country: United States
- Branch: United States Navy
- Role: Anti-submarine warfare
- Garrison/HQ: Naval Air Station Banana River
- Aircraft flown: Vought OS2U/OS2N Kingfisher
- Engagements: Battle of the Atlantic

Scouting Squadron 1-D7 (VS-1D7) was a United States Navy anti-submarine warfare squadron in World War II. It was stationed at Naval Air Station Banana River, Florida (United States).

== World War II ==
This type of squadron was also named "Naval District Inshore Patrol Squadron". VS-1D7 was therefore the first inshore patrol squadron assigned to the 7th Naval District. The squadron was formed on 12 March 1942 with nine pilots, forty-nine men and five OS2N-1 Kingfisher seaplanes. The squadron grew in size over time. In February 1943, it operated eight OS2U-3 at Banana River and two OS2N-1 at Naval Air Station Key West.

As part of Gulf Sea Frontier Operation Plan 3-42 dated 15 March 1942, the squadron became task unit 26.2.9 and flew missions "to patrol shipping lanes" with a "be prepared to provide escort, search, tracking and striking groups." During this operation, the higher headquarters was Fleet Air Wing 12 for administration and Gulf Sea Frontier for operations. Weather permitting, the daily flying routine consisted of two patrols, one departing at dawn and one at dusk. To support operations as needed, the squadron used advanced bases at Walker's Cay and Nassau, Bahamas.

== Cold War ==
The inshore patrol squadrons were redesignated as scouting squadrons on 1 February 1943. Following the end of the war, VS-1D7 was reduced to reserve status and became VS-913. This squadron was reactivated in 1951 as Anti-Submarine Squadron 39 (VS-39) "Hoot Owls". It was disestablished on 1 October 1968.
