= Air Force Technical Applications Center =

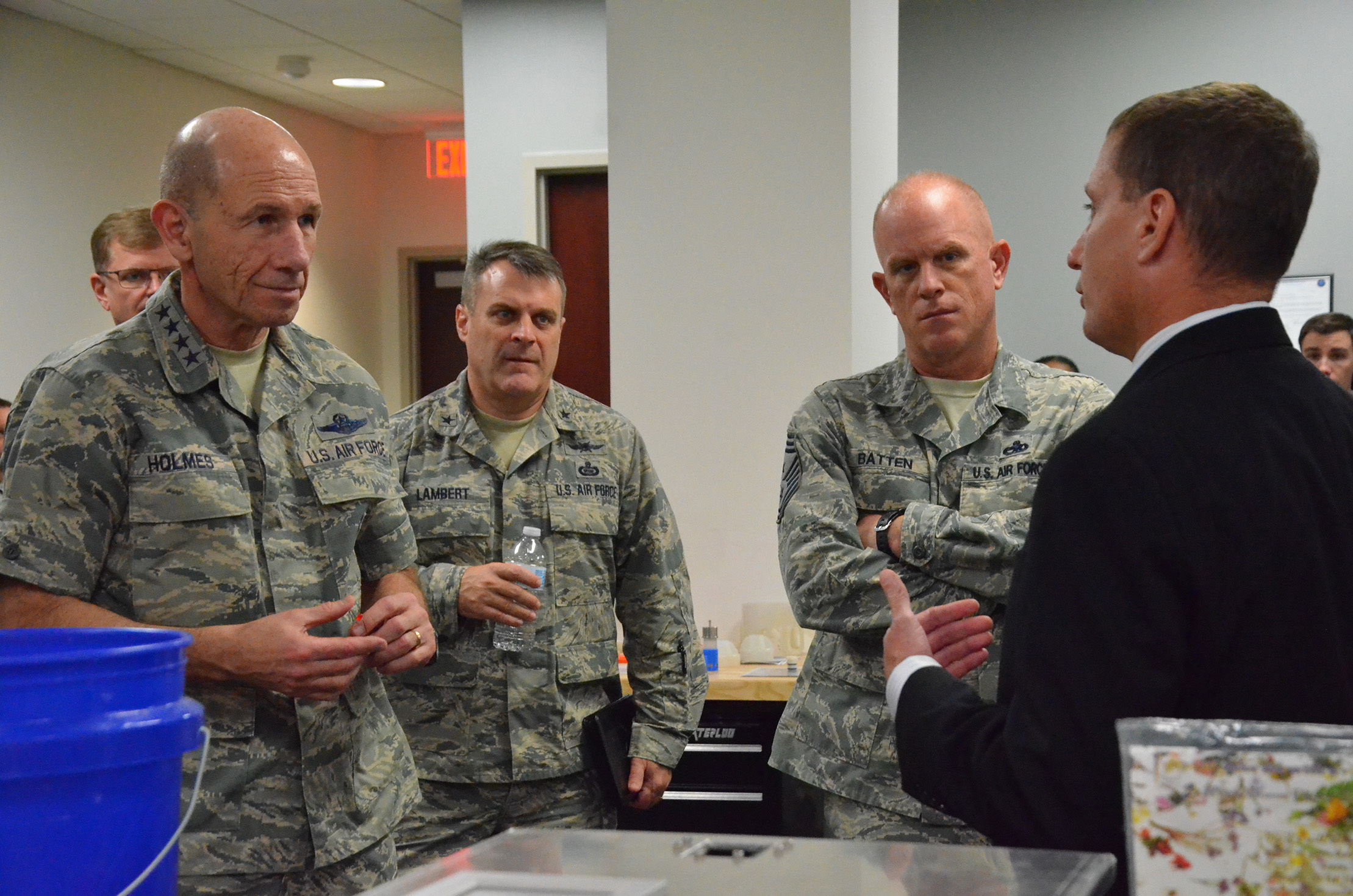
- An engineer at the Air Force Technical Applications Center briefs general Mike Holmes, commander of Air Combat Command (on left) and members of his staff during their visit on 24 January 2018.
- Active: 1959 – present
- Country: United States
- Branch: United States Air Force
- Role: Nuclear arms control and verification
- Size: 1,000 personnel
- Part of: Air Combat Command
- Garrison/HQ: Patrick Space Force Base, Florida
- Motto: In God We Trust. All Others We Monitor.
- Decorations: Air Force Outstanding Unit Award

Commanders
- Current commander: Colonel Creighton Mullins

Insignia
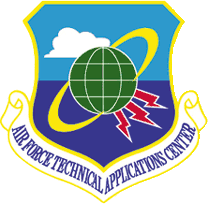
- Air Force Technical Applications Center emblem

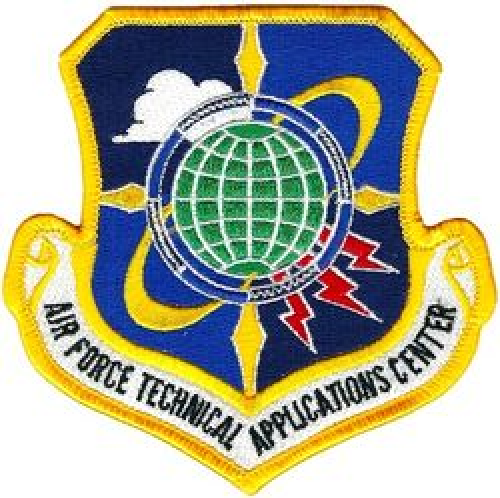
- 1035th USAF Field Activities Group emblem

The Air Force Technical Applications Center (AFTAC), based at Florida's Patrick Space Force Base, is an Air Force surveillance organization assigned to the Sixteenth Air Force. Its mission is to monitor nuclear treaties of all applicable signatory countries. This is accomplished using seismic, hydroacoustic and satellite-detection systems alongside ground based and airborne materials (radioactive debris) collection systems.

== Mission ==
The Air Force Technical Applications Center (AFTAC) is the only American military unit responsible for providing national authorities with technical measurements to monitor nuclear-treaty compliance. It also develops proliferation-monitoring technologies.

AFTAC maintains a system containing more than 3,600 sensors worldwide and a global network of nuclear event-detection equipment called the U.S. Atomic Energy Detection Systems (USAEDS), the largest sensor network in the U.S. Air Force. When a disturbance is detected underground, underwater, in the atmosphere or in space, the event may be analyzed for nuclear identification, and the findings are reported to national command authorities.

AFTAC's nuclear event-detection mission is directly linked to its nuclear treaty-monitoring mission. AFTAC monitors signatory countries' compliance with the 1963 Limited Test Ban Treaty. This treaty prohibits nuclear testing above the Earth's surface and prohibits the venting of nuclear debris or radiation from tests into the atmosphere outside the country's national borders. AFTAC also monitors the Threshold Test Ban Treaty of 1974 and the Peaceful Nuclear Explosion Treaty of 1976. The 1974 treaty limits the size of underground nuclear tests to 150 kilotons, while the 1976 treaty prohibits the testing of nuclear devices outside of agreed treaty sites.

AFTAC conducts technical research and evaluates verification technologies for current and future treaties involving weapons of mass destruction. In 2014, AFTAC supplemented its network of contracted laboratories by opening the Ciambrone Radiochemistry Lab to analyze and assess compliance with nuclear-weapons testing in support of USAEDS and AFTAC's Nuclear Debris Collection and Analysis Program. The 38,000-square-foot (3,500 m^{2}) laboratory became necessary after the center's central laboratory at McClellan Air Force Base closed.

== Component units ==
Unless otherwise indicated, units are based at Patrick Space Force Base, Florida.

- Operating Location A (Ankara, Turkey)
- Operating Location EH (The Pentagon, Virginia)
- Operating Location PG
- Detachment 415 (Chiang Mai, Thailand)
- 709th Special Surveillance and Analysis Group
  - 21st Surveillance Squadron
    - Detachment 1 (Offutt AFB, Nebraska)
  - 22nd Surveillance Squadron
    - Detachment 45 (Buckley SFB, Colorado)
    - Detachment 46 (Cheyenne Mountain SFS, Colorado)
  - 23rd Analysis Squadron
  - 24th Analysis Squadron
  - Air Force Radiochemistry Lab
- 709th Support Group
  - 709th Cyberspace Squadron
  - 709th Support Squadron
  - 709th Technical Maintenance Squadron
    - Detachment 421 (Alice Springs, Central Australia)
  - Detachment 1
- Strategic Integration Directorate
- Strategic Development Directorate
- Plans & Programs Directorate

== History ==
In 1947, General Dwight D. Eisenhower directed the Army Air Forces to develop technologies capable of detecting "atomic explosions anywhere in the world." In 1949, a particulate sampler aboard an Air Weather Service modified B-29 Superfortress flying between Alaska and Japan detected debris from the first Soviet atomic test.

As the Air Force activated AFTAC in 1959 to prepare to monitor compliance with the Limited Test Ban Treaty, AFTAC assumed some responsibilities for the USAEDS and the advancement of long-range detection capabilities. AFTAC's programs evolved into a resource system monitoring compliance with nuclear treaties, supporting the American space program and preparing citizens for nuclear emergencies.

Over the years, the Air Force tasked the nuclear treaty-monitoring center to conduct short-notice collection operations. In April 1986, AFTAC responded to the Ukrainian nuclear accident at the Chernobyl Nuclear Power Plant in the Soviet Union. AFTAC flew 55 sorties compiling 502 flying hours and AFTAC's McClellan Central Laboratory (TOD) processed 354 samples.

In October 2006, AFTAC detected an event associated with North Korea's claim of a nuclear test and later provided verification of the nuclear event to national authorities.

The center supported Operation Tomodachi, the U.S. government's response to the 9.0 earthquake and subsequent tsunami that hit Japan. The Fukushima Daiichi Nuclear Power Plant experienced a nuclear meltdown in three of the plant's six reactors. AFTAC flew nine nuclear debris-collection sorties, processing 342 seismic events, and analyzed 660 samples from the peninsula.

In the summer of 2015, AFTAC removed ten radioactive thermoelectric generators from Alaska that were no longer required. This power source had been the Air Force's largest source of sensitive radioactive material.

In December 2015, the International Atomic Energy Agency (IAEA) released its final assessment on "Past and Present Outstanding Issues" regarding Iran's nuclear program. AFTAC provided trace forensic analysis of samples supporting the IAEA's mission to monitor Iranian compliance with the Joint Comprehensive Plan of Action. As a major component of the IAEA's network of analytical labs, AFTAC's analysis was foundational to the report.

In January and September 2016, AFTAC sensors detected underground disturbances near North Korea's reported nuclear tests. The center's findings were based on seismic activity and were distributed to American authorities.

In September 2017, AFTAC detected nuclear activity in North Korea that registered 6.3 on the Richter scale, ten times more powerful than North Korea's detonation in 2016.

AFTAC also maintains an array of sensors across the United States as part of the National Technical Nuclear Forensics (NTNF) program. The program is designed to collect forensic analysis after attacks against American sites or interests to aid the Federal Bureau of Investigation in identifying governmental or terrorist involvement.

AFTAC works closely with the Comprehensive Nuclear-Test-Ban Treaty Organization (CTBTO) in Vienna, Austria to improve the International Monitoring System. AFTAC contributes six of its U.S.-based USAEDS seismic monitoring stations to the IMS.

== Notable detections ==
=== Russia ===
AFTAC predecessors detected the first Russian nuclear test conducted on 29 August 1949.

=== China ===
On 16 October 1964, AFTAC detected a Chinese atmospheric test.

=== Sinking of Soviet submarine K-129 ===
On 11 March 1968, the acoustic signatures of two extended destructive events were detected by four AFTAC hydroacoustic stations in the Pacific at Midway Island, Kaneohe, Wake Island and Eniwetok and by an AFTAC tap on a U.S. Navy SOSUS array terminating at Adak, Alaska. These signals were analyzed using the differences of arrival times at each station. This detection and localization provided the first specific data on the wreck of the Soviet Golf-II class SSB K-129, which became the target of the CIA's Project Azorian salvage operation conducted in the summer of 1974.

=== India ===
India's first nuclear test was detected on 18 May 1974 by AFTAC.

=== Vela incident ===
On 22 September 1979, one of the Vela satellites detected a double flash of light, consistent with a nuclear explosion, centered over the Prince Edward Islands. There still exists a great deal of contention about whether the detection was nuclear in origin.

=== Pakistan ===
AFTAC detected Pakistan's first of five nuclear tests on 28 May 1998, with another nuclear test on 30 May 1998. The Pakistani tests occurred several days after several Indian tests.

=== North Korea ===
AFTAC has detected and confirmed each of North Korea's nuclear tests between 2006 and 2017.

== Lineage ==
- Designated as the 1035th USAF Field Activities Group and organized on 7 July 1959
- Redesignated as the 1035th Technical Operations Group on 26 June 1972
- Redesignated as the Air Force Technical Applications Center on 1 October 1980

== See also ==
- Sixteenth Air Force
- Air Force Intelligence, Surveillance and Reconnaissance Agency
- Patrick Space Force Base
- Air Combat Command
